= Hunters & Collectors discography =

- Studio albums: 9
- EPs: 4
- Live albums: 3
- Compilation albums: 7
- Singles: 33

The discography of Australian rock group Hunters & Collectors consists of nine studio albums, thirty-three singles, four EPs, three live albums, and seven compilation albums.

== Studio albums ==
List of studio albums, with selected chart positions and certifications
Title	Album details	Peak chart positions				Certifications (sales thresholds)
Title	Album details	AUS	CAN	NZ	SWE	Certifications (sales thresholds)
Hunters & Collectors	Released: 26 July 1982; Label: White Label/Mushroom Records (L42002, C37875); Formats: LP, MC	21	—	14	—	ARIA: Gold; RIANZ: Gold
The Fireman's Curse	Released: 5 September 1983; Label: White Label/Mushroom Records (L38066), Virgin Records (V 2279); Formats: LP	77	—	46	—	ARIA: Gold
The Jaws of Life	Released: 6 August 1984; Label: White Label/Mushroom Records (L38222), Epic Records (EPC26130, EPMC 26130), Slash Records (25193-1, 4–25193); Formats: LP, MC	89	—	37	—	ARIA: Gold
Human Frailty	Released: 7 April 1986; Label: White Label/Mushroom Records (RML53205, RMC53205, CD53205); Formats: LP, MC, CD	10	—	5	—	ARIA: 2× Platinum; RIANZ: Gold
What's a Few Men?	Released: 16 November 1987; Label: White Label/Mushroom Records (RML53253, RMC53253, CD53253); Formats: LP, MC, CD; aka Fate	16	90	9	—	ARIA: Gold
Ghost Nation	Released: November 1989; Label: White Label/Mushroom Records (TVL93314, TVD93314); Formats: LP, MC, CD	10	—	29	31	ARIA: Platinum
Cut	Released: 6 October 1992; Label: White Label/Mushroom Records (TVL93364, TVD93364); Formats: LP, CD	6	—	17	—	ARIA: Platinum
Demon Flower	Released: 16 May 1994; Label: White Label/Mushroom Records (TVD93401); Formats: CD	2	—	9	—	ARIA: Gold
Juggernaut	Released: 26 January 1998; Label: White Label/Mushroom Records (MUSH33081.2); Formats: CD	36	—	48	—	
"—" denotes a recording that did not chart or was not released in that territory.

== Live albums ==
List of live albums, with selected chart positions and certifications
Title	Album details	Peak chart positions		Certifications (sales thresholds)
Title	Album details	AUS	NZ	Certifications (sales thresholds)
The Way to Go Out	Released: 6 May 1985; Label: White Label (L27148); Formats: CD, DVD	76	21	ARIA: Gold
Living in Large Rooms and Lounges	Released: November 1995; Label: White Label (D98017); Formats: 2× CD	45	—	ARIA: Gold
Under One Roof	Released: 11 November 1998; Label: White Label (MUSH33176.2); Formats: CD, DVD; aka Hunters & Collectors - Greatest Hits Live	31 (DVD) (Note: Whilst the CD did not appear on the ARIA Albums Chart, the DVD peaked at No. 31.)	—	ARIA: Gold (DVD) (Note: The Gold Record accreditation is for DVD shipments and not for CD shipments.)
"—" denotes a recording that did not chart or was not released in that territory.

== Compilation albums ==
List of compilation albums, with selected chart positions and certifications
Title	Album details	Peak chart positions		Certifications (sales thresholds)
Title	Album details	AUS	NZ	Certifications (sales thresholds)
Collected Works	Released: 19 November 1990; Label: White Label (TVD93338); Formats: CD, Video	6	26	ARIA: 2× Platinum
Skin, Bone & Bolts	Released: July 1991; Label: Mushroom; Formats: 4× CD; Note: A box set of the first four Hunters & Collectors albums, including their first two EPs.	79	86	
Natural Selection	Released: 13 October 2003; Label: Liberation (BLUE034.5); Formats: 2×CD, DVD	40	—	ARIA: Platinum
Mutations	Released: 19 September 2005; Label: Liberation (BLUE027.2); Formats: CD; Note: A collection of Hunters & Collectors' B-sides compiled onto a single album	—	—	
Horn of Plenty	Released: 22 November 2008; Label: Liberation (HUNTERSBOX); Formats: 14×CD + 2×DVD	—	—	
Cargo Cult	Released: 22 November 2008; Label: Liberation; Formats: CD; Note: A collection of Hunters & Collectors' first three EPs compiled onto a single album	—	—	
Spare Parts	Released: 22 November 2008; Label: Liberation; Formats: CD; A compilation of Hunters & Collectors' rare live recordings and remixes.	—	—	
"—" denotes a recording that did not chart or was not released in that territory.

== EPs ==
List of extended plays, with selected chart positions
Title	Album details	Peak chart positions	
Title	Album details	AUS	NZ
World of Stone	Released: 19 January 1982; Label: White Label/Mushroom (X13078); Formats: EP	50	—
Payload	Released: 29 November 1982; Label: White Label/Mushroom (X14002); Formats: EP	—	31
Living Daylight	Released: 13 April 1987; Label: White Label/Mushroom (X14468, C14468); Formats: EP, MC	41	25
Living Single... In Large Rooms and Lounges	Released: November 1995; Label: White Label/Mushroom (D1227); Formats: EP	123	—
"—" denotes a recording that did not chart or was not released in that territory.

== Singles ==
Year	Title	Peak chart positions			Album
Year	Title	AUS	NZ	US Mod	Album
1982	"World of Stone"	50	—		World of Stone EP
1982	"Talking to a Stranger"	59	—		Hunters & Collectors
1982	"Lumps of Lead"	—	—		Payload EP
1983	"Judas Sheep"	—	35		The Fireman's Curse
1983	"Sway"	—	—		The Fireman's Curse
1984	"The Slab" (Note: "The Slab" is track listed on The Jaws of Life as "Betty's Worry or The Slab" and was released as double A sided single as "The Slab"/"Carry Me".)	—	—		The Jaws of Life
1984	"Carry Me" (Note: "Carry Me" was only released as a single in the UK.)	—	—		The Jaws of Life
1984	"Throw Your Arms Around Me"	—	28		single-only release (Note: "Throw Your Arms Around Me" was recorded in several different versions, the first was a 1984 live recording released as a single-only, the next single version was released in 1986 from Human Frailty and the third single version was released in 1990 from Collected Works.)
1986	"Say Goodbye"	24	20	—	Human Frailty
1986	"Throw Your Arms Around Me"	49	—	—	Human Frailty
1986	"Everything's on Fire"	78	44	—	Human Frailty
1986	"Is There Anybody in There?"	—	41	—	Human Frailty
1987	"Inside a Fireball"	41	—	—	Living Daylight EP
1987	"Do You See What I See?"	33	13	—	What's a Few Men? (Note: What's a Few Men? was released in Australia in November 1987 by White Label/Mushroom Records. It was released in North America under I.R.S. Records as Fate in September 1988 with a different track order and included new tracks, such as "Back on the Breadline" which was released as a single. The 2003 version of What's a Few Men? contained all 15 tracks from the two 1980s versions.)
1988	"Still Hangin' 'Round"	—	48	—	What's a Few Men?
1988	"Back on the Breadline"	37	—	6	What's a Few Men?
1989	"When The River Runs Dry"	23	41	5	Ghost Nation
1990	"Blind Eye"	42	—	—	Ghost Nation
1990	"The Way You Live"	75	—	—	Ghost Nation
1990	"Love All Over Again"	promo	—	—	Ghost Nation
1990	"Throw Your Arms Around Me"	34	—	—	Collected Works
1991	"Where Do You Go?"	33	49	—	Cut
1992	"Head Above Water"	64	—	—	Cut
1992	"We the People"	70	36	—	Cut
1992	"True Tears of Joy"	14	47	—	Cut
1993	"Holy Grail"	20	25	—	Cut
1993	"Imaginary Girl"	82	—	—	Cut
1994	"Easy"	38	38	—	Demon Flower
1994	"Back in the Hole"	105	—	—	Demon Flower
1994	"Drop in the Ocean"	111	—	—	Demon Flower
1996	"Holy Water"	77	—	—	
1997	"Higher Plane"	promo	—	—	Juggernaut
1998	"Suit Your Style"	157	—	—	Juggernaut
2003	"Debris"	promo	—	—	Unnatural Selection
"—" denotes releases that did not chart or were not released in that country.
