= Human Frailty =

Studio album by Hunters & Collectors
- Released: 7 April 1986
- Recorded: 1985–86; Allan Eaton Sound, St Kilda
- Genre: Australian rock
- Length: 53:19
- Label: Mushroom (AUS); I.R.S. (U.S)
- Producer: Gavin MacKillop, Hunters & Collectors

Hunters & Collectors chronology
The Way to Go Out (1985)	Human Frailty (1986)	What's a Few Men? (1987)

Singles from Human Frailty
- 1. "Say Goodbye" Released: 17 February 1986; 2. "Throw Your Arms Around Me" Released: 28 April 1986; 3. "Everything's on Fire" Released: 18 August 1986; 4. "Is There Anybody in There?" Released: 27 October 1986

Human Frailty is the fourth studio album by Australian rock band Hunters & Collectors, which was released on 7 April 1986. It was a commercial and critical success. The album peaked at No. 10 on the Australian Kent Music Report Albums Chart and No. 5 on the New Zealand Albums Chart. Four singles were issued from the album, "Say Goodbye", which reached No. 24 on the Kent Music Report Singles Chart; "Throw Your Arms Around Me" (a re-recorded version of a previous single), No. 49; "Everything's on Fire", No. 78; and "Is There Anybody in There", which did not chart in Australia but did reach No. 41 on the New Zealand Singles Chart.

At the 1986 Countdown Australian Music Awards the album was nominated for Best Australian Album.

In October 2010, Human Frailty was listed at No. 18 in the book, 100 Best Australian Albums.

== Background ==
Human Frailty was released on 7 April 1986 and is the fourth studio album by Australian rock band Hunters & Collectors. Their line up was John Archer on bass guitar, Doug Falconer on drums, Jack Howard on trumpet, Robert Miles on live sound, Mark Seymour on lead vocals and guitar, Jeremy Smith on French horn, and Michael Waters on keyboards and trombone.

Seymour later told Tracee Hutchison: "I remember having a discussion with [Miles] and [Falconer] in a beergarden at the Standard Hotel in Fitzroy, and I said 'Look, you know, we should try and make a commercial record if we want to take things seriously in the long term.' I think that was a year before we even started thinking about recording this record". He recalled for 100 Best Australian Albums (October 2010) that all the tracks are "connected to the relationship that [my then-girlfriend] and I had".

Human Frailty became their first Australian Top Ten album reaching No. 8 on the Australian charts and No. 5 in New Zealand. The lead single from the album, "Say Goodbye", was released in February 1986, and peaked at No. 24 in Australia and No. 20 in New Zealand. A third version of "Throw Your Arms Around Me" was recorded for the album and was issued as its second single, which peaked at No. 49 in Australian in May 1986. Eventually it became one of their most popular songs, voted in the Top 5 on the Triple J Hottest 100 for 1989, 1990, and 1991.

Two further singles from Human Frailty were released: "Everything's on Fire" in August and "Is There Anybody in There?" in October, both reached the top 50 in New Zealand (No. 44 and 41 respectively) but not in Australia. The album included a cover version of a track originally recorded by Sardine v, "Stuck on You", written by Ian Rilen and Stephanie Falconer aka Stephanie Rilen.

Hunters & Collectors signed a parallel deal with I.R.S. Records for North America, which released the album in July 1987, although with a different track listing from the Australian version. I.R.S. Records also re-issued the album in a CD format, including all three tracks from the Living Daylight extended play (April 1987, Australasia-only). In July 1991 White Label Records re-issued the album on CD, also including Living Daylight tracks. Liberation Music released a re-mastered issue of Human Frailty on 7 July 2003.

On 20 September 2007, SBS in Australia aired a one-hour documentary on Hunters & Collectors and Human Frailty as the part of their Great Australian Albums series. The series was subsequently released on DVD on 22 October 2008.

== Reception ==
Professional ratings
Review scores
Source	Rating
Allmusic	4.5/5 stars

In May 1986 Pollyanna Sutton of The Canberra Times reviewed Human Frailty, she felt that their "early rythmical [sic] drum beats, abstract music and sometimes inaudible lyrics have been turned around to produce [the album], something of a showpiece for lead singer, Mark Seymour". The album had "broadened the band's audience, taking away the uncertainty which manifested itself" earlier. In the next month her colleague, Lisa Wallace, declared it "the best album I have heard in a long, longtime. It's clean, fresh, emotional and very, very good. Not for many a moon (far too many) has there been an Australian band which has proved itself such a consistent winner".

Fellow Australian music journalist, Ed Nimmervoll, noted "Seymour's themes of alienation and sexual politics came to the fore" with this album. He described how the group "had discovered how to tap the unique vein they had unearthed; where, in a sweat-dripping venue packed to the rafters with a beer swilling macho rock fans the audience would and could at the top of their voices unselfconsciously sing along to a chorus like 'you don't make me feel like a woman any more'". While Ian McFarlane saw it showed "further refinement of the sinewy and dynamic approach established on The Jaws of Life".

Allmusic's Steve Kurutz saw the group had "finally discovered their true strength; a balance of bass and drum-driven grooves set below punchy horns and counterpoint melody lines". In October 2010, it was listed at No. 18 in the book, 100 Best Australian Albums. Its three authors, John O'Donnell, Toby Creswell, and Craig Mathieson, praised "the immense power of [Archer's] bass and [Falconer's] drums set against Seymour's inventive guitar playing ... the songs were still esoteric, the massive bottom end made [them] an increasingly popular band around the pubs".

== Track listing ==
All lyrics are written by Mark Seymour; all music is composed by John Archer, Doug Falconer, Jack Howard, Robert Miles, Seymour, Jeremy Smith, Michael Waters; unless otherwise indicated

No.	Title	Writer(s)	Length
1.	"Say Goodbye"		3:51
2.	"Throw Your Arms Around Me"	Archer, Geoffrey Crosby, Falconer, Howard, Miles, Seymour, Waters	3:53
3.	"Dog"		3:40
4.	"Everything's on Fire"		4:27
5.	"Relief"		5:08
6.	"The Finger"		4:28
7.	"99th Home Position"		2:39
8.	"Is There Anybody in There?"		3:25
9.	"Stuck on You"	Ian Rilen, S Falconer) (aka Stephanie Rilen)	3:13
10.	"This Morning"		6:42

All lyrics are written by Seymour; all music is composed by Archer, Falconer, Howard, Miles, Seymour, Smith, Waters; unless otherwise indicated

[Bonus tracks] (from Living Daylights EP)
No.	Title	Length
11.	"Living Daylight"	3:14
12.	"Inside a Fireball"	4:05
13.	"January Rain"	4:27

== Personnel ==
Credited to:

Hunters & Collectors members

- John Archer – bass guitar
- Doug Falconer – drums
- John 'Jack' Howard – trumpet
- Robert Miles – live sound, art director
- Mark Seymour – vocals, lead guitar
- Jeremy Smith – French horn
- Michael Waters – trombone, keyboards

Additional musicians

- Shellie Conway – additional vocals
- Dianne Howard – piano
- Gavin MacKillop – additional vocals
- Debbie Waugh – marimba, xylophone

The Como Quartet

- Alex Black – violin
- Adam Duncan – viola
- Sue Hadlee – cello
- Peter O'Reilly – cello
- George Vi – violin

Recording details

- Producer – Hunters & Collectors, Gavin MacKillop
- Engineer – Gavin MacKillop
  - Assistant engineer – Doug Brady, Michael Streefkerk
- Recording/mixing engineer – Robert Miles
- Studio – Allan Eaton Sound, St Kilda (recording); AAV Studio One, Melbourne (mixing)

Art works

- Art director – Robert Miles

== Charts ==
Chart (1986)	Peak position
Australia (Kent Music Report)	10
New Zealand Albums Chart	5
