= Everything's on Fire =

Single by Hunters & Collectors

from the album Human Frailty
- B-side: "This Morning"
- Released: 18 August 1986
- Recorded: 1985; Allan Eaton Sound, St Kilda
- Genre: Pub rock
- Length: 3:37
- Label: White/Mushroom, Festival
- Songwriter(s): John Archer, Doug Falconer, Jack Howard, Robert Miles, Mark Seymour, Jeremy Smith, Michael Waters
- Producer(s): Gavin MacKillop, Hunters & Collectors

Hunters & Collectors singles chronology
"Throw Your Arms Around Me" (1986)	"Everything's on Fire" (1986)	"Is There Anybody in There?" (1986)

"Everything's on Fire" was the third single from Australian pub rockers, Hunters & Collectors' fourth studio album, Human Frailty. It was released after the album on 18 August 1986 in both 7" and 12" formats. It peaked in the top 100 on the Australian Kent Music Report Singles Chart and No. 44 on the New Zealand Singles Chart. "Everything's on Fire" was co-written by band members John Archer, Doug Falconer, Jack Howard, Robert Miles, Mark Seymour, Jeremy Smith, and Michael Waters.

== Background ==
Australian pub rockers Hunters & Collectors released "Everything's on Fire" on 18 August 1986 after their fourth studio album, Human Frailty which had appeared in April. The track was co-written by band members John Archer on bass guitar, Doug Falconer on drums, Jack Howard on trumpet, Robert Miles on live sound, Mark Seymour on lead vocals and guitar, Jeremy Smith on French horn, and Michael Waters on keyboards and trombone.

"Everything's on Fire" was released in both 7" and 12" formats on White Label/Mushroom Records and, as with the album, was co-produced by Gavin MacKillop with the band. The single reached the top 100 on the Australian Kent Music Report Singles Chart and No. 44 on the New Zealand Singles Chart.

It appeared on the group's first compilation album, Collected Works (November 1990). Andrew de Groot directed the music video for "Everything's on Fire" and its following single, "Is There Anybody in There?". Both appeared on the VHS compilation also titled, Collected Works. A live version of "Everything's on Fire" appeared on Living ... In Large Rooms and Lounges (November 1995) from a pub gig.

== Reception ==
In October 2010, "Everything's on Fire" was described in the book, 100 Best Australian Albums, by the three authors, John O'Donnell, Toby Creswell, and Craig Mathieson: "Seymour's lyrics all relate back to the folie à deux in the blue bed-sit. 'Dog', 'The Finger' and 'Everything's on Fire' are all songs of lust and obsessions".

== Track listing ==
7" version
No.	Title	Writer(s)	Length
1.	"Everything's on Fire"	John Archer, Doug Falconer, Jack Howard, Robert Miles, Mark Seymour, Jeremy Smith, Michael Waters	3:37
2.	"This Morning"	Archer, Falconer, Howard, Miles, Seymour, Smith, Waters	4:51

All tracks are written by John Archer, Doug Falconer, Jack Howard, Robert Miles, Mark Seymour, Jeremy Smith, Michael Waters; unless otherwise indicated

12" version
No.	Title	Length
1.	"Everything's on Fire"	4:27
2.	"This Morning"	4:51
3.	"Mind of an American"	3:50

== Personnel ==
Credited to:

Hunters & Collectors members

- John Archer – bass guitar
- Doug Falconer – drums
- John 'Jack' Howard – trumpet
- Robert Miles – live sound, art director
- Mark Seymour – vocals, lead guitar
- Jeremy Smith – French horn
- Michael Waters – trombone, keyboards

Recording details

- Producer – Hunters & Collectors, Gavin MacKillop
- Engineer – Gavin MacKillop
  - Assistant engineer – Doug Brady, Michael Streefkerk
- Recording/mixing engineer – Robert Miles
- Studio – Allan Eaton Sound, St Kilda (recording); AAV Studio One, Melbourne (mixing)

Art works

- Art director – Robert Miles

== Charts ==
Chart (1986)	Peak position
Australia (Kent Music Report)	78
New Zealand Singles Chart	44
