= Collected Works (Hunters & Collectors album) =

Compilation album by Hunters & Collectors
- Released: 19 November 1990
- Genre: Australian rock
- Length: 68:33
- Label: White/Mushroom
- Producer: Hunters & Collectors, Mike Howlett, Konrad 'Conny' Plank, Gavin MacKillop, Greg Edward, Clive Martin

Compilation albums chronology
Collected Works (1990)	Skin, Bone & Bolts (1991)

Singles from Collected Works
- 1. "Throw Your Arms Around Me" Released: November 1990

Collected Works is the first compilation album by Australian rock group, Hunters & Collectors. It was issued on 19 November 1990 by Mushroom Records' White Label and includes material from their previous six studio albums as well as a re-recording of "Throw Your Arms Around Me", which was released as a single. The album peaked at No. 6 on the ARIA Albums Chart and No. 26 on the New Zealand Albums Chart.

== Background ==
Hunters & Collectors celebrated ten years since their formation with the release of their first compilation album, Collected Works, on 19 November 1990. It appeared on the White Label imprint of Mushroom Records. The group's founding mainstays were John Archer (bass guitar), Doug Falconer (drums) and Mark Seymour (guitar and lead vocals). They were joined by Robert Miles (sound engineer) and Ray Tosti-Gueira on guitar and backing vocals. By September 1980 they had added Geoff Crosby on keyboards and Greg Perano (ex-True Wheels) on percussion.

The core of Hunters & Collectors was expanded by a brass section, later dubbed Horns of Contempt, including Michael Waters on trombone; Jack Howard on trumpet; and Jeremy Smith on French horn. By July 1982 Tosti-Gueira was replaced by Martin Lubran (ex-Spiny Norman) on guitar. In early 1988 Barry Palmer (Harem Scarem, ex-Stephen Cummings Band) joined the group on guitar.

This album's slower acoustic version of "Throw Your Arms Around Me" had been recorded in 1989 (at the same time as sessions for their sixth studio album, Ghost Nation) and was co-produced by Hunters & Collectors with Clive Martin, and was mixed by Eric "E.T" Thorngren. It was released as a single in November 1990 and reached No. 34 on the ARIA Singles Chart. This was the third time the group had issued "Throw Your Arms Around Me" as a single. The group's first video album, of the same name, was released simultaneously on VHS. It comprised 14 music videos and three live tracks, the latter had been recorded at The Venue, Melbourne on 24 and 25 August 1984.

To support the album's appearance the group undertook a national Collected Works Tour for two months into January the following year. Seymour told Bevan Hannan of The Canberra Times, that the tour was "an interruption in a manner of speaking. We're actually in the process of writing an album which we are meant to be recording in April or May. But it's been really good, much better than anything we've done before as far as crowd sizes".

On the record liner notes Seymour states "This record documents ten years of Hunters and Collectors music. It includes material from every 'period', including those times when the band's popularity waned, music that few people have heard, and music that some may have forgotten". It was also released overseas by I.R.S. Records, with a different track listing, as it only featured material recorded during the time the band was signed with that label. The United Kingdom version included "Stuck on You" instead of "Talking to a Stranger".

== Reception ==
Professional ratings
Review scores
Source	Rating
Allmusic	4.5/5 stars

Penelope Layland of The Canberra Times felt the album was an "excellent compilation ... a double album of well-chosen, quality tracks ... must rate as one of the best-value Christmas present in the record stores this summer". Allmusic's Mike DeGagne described the United States version on I.R.S. Records, which "takes the best tracks from the first ten years of the band's existence and lays them out in chronological order, resulting in a wonderful compilation".

== Track listing ==
Australian version on White Label Records/Mushroom Records
No.	Title	Writer(s)	Length
1.	"Talking to a Stranger" (Remix)	John Archer, Geoff Crosby, Doug Falconer, Robert Miles, Greg Perano, Mark Seymour, Ray Tosti-Guerra	3:51
2.	"Run Run Run"	Archer, Crosby, Falconer, Seymour	8:54
3.	"Lumps of Lead"	Archer, Crosby, Falconer, Martin Lubran, Miles, Perano, Seymour	4:08
4.	"42 Wheels"	Archer, Crosby, Falconer, Jack Howard, Miles, Seymour, Waters	3:18
5.	"Carry Me"	Archer, Crosby, Falconer, Miles, Seymour, Waters	3:25
6.	"The Slab"	Archer, Crosby, Falconer, Miles, Seymour, Waters	3:55
7.	"Say Goodbye"	Archer, Falconer, Howard, Miles, Seymour, Jeremy Smith, Waters	5:05
8.	"Everything's on Fire"	Archer, Falconer, Howard, Miles, Seymour, Smith, Waters	4:25
9.	"Throw Your Arms Around Me" (1990 remix)	Archer, Crosby, Falconer, Jack Howard, Miles, Seymour, Michael Waters	4:12
10.	"This Morning"	Archer, Falconer, Howard, Miles, Seymour, Smith, Waters	6:42
11.	"January Rain"	Archer, Falconer, Howard, Miles, Seymour, Smith, Waters	4:25
12.	"Faraway Man"	Archer, Crosby, Falconer, Miles, Perano, Seymour, Tosti-Guerra	3:07
13.	"Do You See What I See?"	Archer, Falconer, Howard, Miles, Seymour, Smith, Waters	3:38
14.	"Blind Eye"	Archer, Falconer, Howard, Miles, Barry Palmer, Seymour, Smith, Waters	4:29
15.	"When the River Runs Dry"	Archer, Falconer, Howard, Miles, Seymour, Smith, Waters	3:14
Total length:			68:33

International release on I.R.S. Records
No.	Title	Writer(s)	Length
1.	"Faraway Man"	John Archer, Geoff Crosby, Doug Falconer, Robert Miles, Greg Perano, Mark Seymour, Ray Tosti-Guerra	3:07
2.	"Throw Your Arms Around Me"	Archer, Crosby, Falconer, Jack Howard, Miles, Seymour, Michael Waters	3:52
3.	"Inside a Fireball"	Archer, Falconer, Howard, Miles, Seymour, Jeremy Smith, Waters	4:03
4.	"Dog"	Archer, Falconer, Howard, Miles, Seymour, Smith, Waters	3:38
5.	"Everything's on Fire"	Archer, Falconer, Howard, Miles, Seymour, Smith, Waters	4:25
6.	"Do You See What I See?"	Archer, Falconer, Howard, Miles, Seymour, Smith, Waters	3:38
7.	"Around the Flame"	Archer, Falconer, Howard, Miles, Seymour, Smith, Waters	3:50
8.	"Give Me a Reason"	Archer, Falconer, Howard, Miles, Seymour, Smith, Waters	3:39
9.	"Wishing Well"	Archer, Falconer, Howard, Miles, Seymour, Smith, Waters	4:12
10.	"Talking to a Stranger" (Remix)	Archer, Crosby, Falconer, Miles, Perano, Seymour, Tosti-Guerra	3:51
11.	"Say Goodbye"	Archer, Falconer, Howard, Miles, Seymour, Smith, Waters	5:05
12.	"January Rain"	Archer, Falconer, Howard, Miles, Seymour, Smith, Waters	4:25
13.	"Back on the Breadline"	Archer, Falconer, Howard, Miles, Seymour, Smith, Waters	4:02
14.	"Is There Anybody in There?"	Rudolf Schenker	3:24
15.	"Still Hanging 'Round"	Archer, Falconer, Howard, Miles, Seymour, Smith, Waters	3:14
16.	"Breakneck Road"	Archer, Falconer, Howard, Miles, Seymour, Smith, Waters	2:40
Total length:			60:02

VHS version
No.	Title	Writer(s)	Length
1.	"Talking to a Stranger" (music video, directed by Richard Lowenstein)	Archer, Crosby, Falconer, Miles, Perano, Seymour, Tosti-Guerra
2.	"Lumps of Lead" (music video, directed by Lowenstein)	Archer, Crosby, Falconer, Martin Lubran, Miles, Perano, Seymour
3.	"Judas Sheep" (music video)	Archer, Crosby, Falconer, Lubran, Miles, Perano, Seymour, Waters
4.	"The Slab" (music video)	Archer, Crosby, Falconer, Miles, Seymour, Waters
5.	"I Couldn't Give It to You" (live)	Archer, Crosby, Falconer, Miles, Seymour, Waters
6.	"Little Chalkie" (live)	Archer, Crosby, Falconer, Lubran, Miles, Perano, Seymour, Waters
7.	"I Believe" (live)	Ray Charles
8.	"Say Goodbye" (music video)	Archer, Falconer, Howard, Miles, Seymour, Smith, Waters
9.	"Everything's on Fire" (music video, directed by Andrew de Groot)	Archer, Falconer, Howard, Miles, Seymour, Smith, Waters
10.	"Is There Anybody in There?" (music video, directed by de Groot)	Rudolf Schenker
11.	"Do You See What I See?" (music video)	Archer, Falconer, Howard, Miles, Seymour, Smith, Waters
12.	"Still Hanging 'Round" (music video)	Archer, Falconer, Howard, Miles, Seymour, Smith, Waters
13.	"Back on the Breadline" (music video)	Archer, Falconer, Howard, Miles, Seymour, Smith, Waters
14.	"When the River Runs Dry" (music video)	Archer, Falconer, Howard, Miles, Seymour, Smith, Waters
15.	"Blind Eye" (music video)	Archer, Falconer, Howard, Miles, Palmer, Seymour, Smith, Waters
16.	"The Way You Live" (music video)	Archer, Falconer, Howard, Miles, Palmer, Seymour, Smith, Waters
17.	"Throw Your Arms Around Me" (music video (1990))	Archer, Crosby, Falconer, Jack Howard, Miles, Seymour, Michael Waters

== Personnel ==
Credited to:

Hunters & Collectors members

- John Archer – bass guitar
- Geoff Crosby – keyboards, Korg MS-20, effects
- Doug Falconer – drums, percussion
- Robert Miles – live sound, art director
- Greg Perano – percussion
- Mark Seymour – guitar, lead vocals
- Ray Tosti-Guerra – guitar, backing vocals
- Martin Lubran – guitar
- Barry Palmer – lead guitar

Horns of Contempt members

- Nigel Crocker – trombone
- Jack Howard – trumpet, keyboards, backing vocals
- Andy Lynn – trumpet
- Chris Malherbe – trumpet
- Jeremy Smith – French horn, keyboards, guitar
- Michael Waters – trombone, keyboards

Production details

- Producer – Hunters & Collectors, Konrad Plank, Mike Howlett, Gavin MacKillop, Greg Edward, Clive Martin

== Charts ==
Chart (1990+)	Peak position
Australian Albums (ARIA)	6
New Zealand Albums (RMNZ)	26

== Certifications ==
Region	Certification	Certified units/sales
Australia (ARIA)	2× Platinum	140,000^{^}
^{^} Shipments figures based on certification alone.
