= Is There Anybody in There? =

"Is There Anybody In There?"

Single by Hunters & Collectors

from the album Human Frailty
- Released: October 1986
- Genre: Rock, Pub rock
- Length: 3:25 (Single Version) 5:21 (Extended Dance Mix)
- Label: White/Mushroom, Festival
- Songwriter(s): John Archer, Doug Falconer, Jack Howard, Robert Miles, Mark Seymour, Jeremy Smith, Michael Waters
- Producer(s): Gavin MacKillop, Hunters & Collectors

Hunters & Collectors singles chronology
"Everything's on Fire" (1986)	"Is There Anybody In There?" (1986)	"Inside a Fireball" (1987)

"Is There Anybody in There?" is the twelfth single by Australian pub rock band Hunters & Collectors, released in 1986. It was released on 27 October 1986 as the fourth and final single from the album Human Frailty, in both 7" and 12" formats. "Is There Anybody in There?" peaked at number 41 on the Recorded Music NZ.

== Track listing ==
7" version
No.	Title	Writer(s)	Length
1.	"Is There Anybody in There?"	Mark Seymour, John Archer, Doug Falconer, Robert Miles, Jeremy Smith, Michael Waters, John Howard	3:25
2.	"Dog"	Mark Seymour, John Archer, Doug Falconer, Robert Miles, Jeremy Smith, Michael Waters, John Howard	3:40

All tracks are written by Mark Seymour, John Archer, Doug Falconer, Robert Miles, Jeremy Smith, Michael Waters, John Howard

12" version
No.	Title	Length
1.	"Is There Anybody in There?" (extended dance mix)	5:21
2.	"Is There Anybody in There?" (7" version)	3:24
3.	"Honey In The Jar (Instrumental)"	3:25

== Personnel ==
- John Archer – bass guitar
- Doug Falconer – drums
- John 'Jack' Howard – trumpet
- Robert Miles – live sound, art director
- Mark Seymour – vocals, lead guitar
- Jeremy Smith – French horn
- Michael Waters – trombone, keyboards

Production

- Producer – Hunters & Collectors, Gavin MacKillop
- Engineer – Gavin MacKillop
  - Assistant engineer – Doug Brady, Michael Streefkerk
- Recording/mixing engineer – Robert Miles
- Studio – Allan Eaton Sound, St Kilda (recording); AAV Studio One, Melbourne (mixing)

== Chart performance ==
Chart (1986)	Peak position
New Zealand Singles Chart	41
