= The Jaws of Life (Hunters & Collectors album) =

Studio album by Hunters & Collectors
- Released: 6 August 1984
- Recorded: 10 March – 10 April 1984; Can's Studio, Weilerswist, Germany
- Genre: Rock
- Length: 59:49
- Labels: White/Mushroom (AUS/NZ); Epic (UK/Europe); Slash (US/Canada)
- Producers: Konrad Plank, Hunters & Collectors

Hunters & Collectors chronology
The Fireman's Curse (1983)	The Jaws of Life (1984)	The Way to Go Out (1985)

Singles from Hunters & Collectors
- 1. "The Slab" Released: August 1984; 2. "Carry Me" Released: 1984

The Jaws of Life
- 1991 version (White Label/Mushroom)

The Jaws of Life is the third studio album by Australian rock band Hunters & Collectors; it was released on 6 August 1984. It was co-produced by Konrad Plank and the band in Weilerswist, Germany. The album peaked at No. 89 on the Australian Kent Music Report Albums Chart and No. 37 on the New Zealand Albums Chart. The only Australian single from the album, "The Slab" ("Betty's Worry")/"Carry Me", was released as a Double A sided single, in August but failed to chart on the Australian or New Zealand singles charts.

== Background ==
Late in 1983, Hunters & Collectors had briefly disbanded, but soon reformed without Martin Lubran and Greg Perano. Mark Seymour (guitar and lead vocals) explained to The Canberra Times' Neil Lade that the group had reconvened because they had "something valuable to offer the Australian music scene". According to Doug Falconer, the group's drummer, The Jaws of Life "was written in about a month and a half after the band returned to Australia" in the previous December. He recalled that they had wanted "to have a bit of a change of style, a change of atmosphere, it (the writing) was getting too heavy handed". He felt the band was "a much happier unit". Seymour added, "We'd always leap around suburban lounge rooms listening to the Stones. So we started playing rhythms that had that feel."

The 1984 line-up now featured greater use of keyboards by Geoff Crosby, as well as more emphasis on their horn section of Jack Howard on trumpet and backing vocals, Jeremy Smith on French horn and Michael Waters on trombone. The band began to pare back the art rock ambience of their earlier albums, although they retained a muscular, bass-driven sound, rounded off by a distinctive horn section. Seymour's lyrics became less abstruse and focused on the twin themes of the fraught personal relationships and the politics of the day.

The Jaws of Life, their third studio album, was issued on 6 August 1984 on White Label/Mushroom Records. Like their previous album, The Fireman's Curse (1983), it was co-produced with Konrad Plank (Can, Cluster, Kraftwerk), but this time it was recorded at Can's Studio with René Tinner engineering. The title, cover art and opening track, "42 Wheels", all refer to the murder of five people by an intoxicated, outback trucker, Douglas Crabbe.

The album reached No. 89 on the Australia Album charts and No. 37 on the New Zealand charts. The first single from the album, "The Slab", having been renamed from its original title of "Betty's Worry or The Slab", was also released in August, as a double A-sided single, with "Carry Me" but failed to chart. A music video was shot for "The Slab" and entered rotation on MTV in mid-October 1984. "Carry Me" was released in the UK as a separate single (both in a 7" and 12" format). Nevertheless, as a result of relentless touring, airplay on radio station Triple J plus their music videos screening on Countdown and other music video shows, the group fostered a devoted following on the pub rock scene.

In the UK the album was released on the Epic Records label, where according to Michael Waters, "it got favorable reviews, but it just didn't sell." In North America it was released by Slash Records.

In July 1991 The Jaws of Life was re-issued on CD by White Label Records/Mushroom Records, with the inclusion of a further four tracks from an earlier extended play, Payload (November 1982). The album was subsequently re-issued on CD by Phantom Records in the United Kingdom on 26 November 2002 and was re-mastered and re-released by Liberation Music on 11 August 2003.

== Reception ==
Professional ratings
Review scores
Source	Rating
Allmusic	4/5 stars

Australian musicologist, Ian McFarlane, described The Jaws of Life as having "a stripped-down rock sound, a driving rhythm, more concise arrangements and stronger songs". While Toby Creswell writing for Rolling Stone felt its "aesthetic push ranged from the barrenness and isolation of outback Australia to the beer-swilling machismo of the suburbs".

Neil Lade of The Canberra Times noted that the "music is abrasive but creative. Full of raw energy and power. Not particularly pretty but incredibly satisfying. Be warned: if you're heavily committed, to the gentle and conventional, you'd best veer away". Allmusic's Bill Cassel felt "their more ambitious artistic impulses were harnessed to melodic, concise, and structured songs" which delivered "a superior and highly recommended record".

Michael Witheford of TimeOut Melbourne describes the album as being "almost a concept record; the soundscape of a drive over the West Gate Bridge towards the refineries and container docks and far beyond. Always sweat, heavy lifting, beer and the cleansing offered by the temporary deliverance of sex and the support of a woman to wipe the steaming brow and carry home the hopeless barfly", making for "a taut and emotionally explosive tour de force of an album."

Outside Australia, Peter Martin writing in the UK edition of Smash Hits said, "the results are painful. The music takes you on a tortuous journey through the barren wasteland of Down Under. It's full of dark, brooding, hard-edged funk but don't make the mistake of trying to dance to it. You'll do yourself an injury."

== Track listing ==
All tracks are written by John Archer, Geoff Crosby, Doug Falconer, Robert Miles, Mark Seymour, Michael Waters; unless otherwise indicated

1984 White Label Records release
No.	Title	Writer(s)	Length
1.	"42 Wheels"	Archer, Crosby, Falconer, Jack Howard, Miles, Seymour, Waters	3:18
2.	"Holding Down a D"		3:40
3.	"Way to Go Out"	Archer, Crosby, Falconer, Howard, Miles, Seymour, Waters	3:21
4.	"I Couldn't Give It to You"		3:31
5.	"It's Early Days Yet"		2:54
6.	"I Believe"	Ray Charles	2:54
7.	"Betty's Worry or The Slab"		3:55
8.	"Hayley's Doorstep"		5:35
9.	"Red Lane"		3:44
10.	"Carry Me"		4:10
11.	"Little Chalkie"	Archer, Crosby, Falconer, Martin Lubran, Miles, Greg Perano, Seymour, Waters	3:25
Total length:			59:49

All tracks are written by John Archer, Geoff Crosby, Doug Falconer, Robert Miles, Mark Seymour, Michael Waters; unless otherwise indicated

July 1991 Australian CD reissue on White Label Records
No.	Title	Writer(s)	Length
1.	"42 Wheels"	Archer, Crosby, Falconer, Jack Howard, Miles, Seymour, Waters	3:18
2.	"Holding Down a D"		3:40
3.	"The Way to Go Out"	Archer, Crosby, Falconer, Howard, Miles, Seymour, Waters	3:21
4.	"I Couldn't Give It to You"		3:31
5.	"It's Early Days Yet"		2:54
6.	"I Believe"	Ray Charles	2:54
7.	"Betty's Worry or The Slab" (remix)		3:58
8.	"Hayley's Doorstep"		5:35
9.	"Red Lane"		3:44
10.	"Carry Me" (remix)		4:12
11.	"Little Chalkie"	Archer, Crosby, Falconer, Martin Lubran, Miles, Greg Perano, Seymour, Waters	3:25
12.	"Tow Truck"	Archer, Crosby, Falconer, Lubran, Miles, Perano, Seymour	4:58
13.	"Drop Tank"	Archer, Crosby, Falconer, Lubran, Miles, Perano, Seymour	4:56
14.	"Mouthtrap"	Archer, Crosby, Falconer, Miles, Perano, Seymour	4:10
15.	"Lumps of Lead"	Archer, Crosby, Falconer, Lubran, Miles, Perano, Seymour	4:09
Total length:			78:06

== Personnel ==
Credited to:

Hunters & Collectors members

- John Archer – bass guitar
- Geoff Crosby – keyboards, effects
- Doug Falconer – drums, percussion
- Jack Howard – trumpet, backing vocals
- Robert Miles – live sound, art director
- Mark Seymour – guitar, lead vocals
- Jeremy Smith – French horn
- Michael Waters – trombone

Production details

- Producer – Konrad Plank, Hunters & Collectors
- Engineer – René Tinner
- Mixer – Plank, Robert Miles
- Remixer – Greg Edward (1991 tracks 7, 10)
- Studio – Can's Studio, Weilerswist, Germany
  - Mixing studio – Conny's Studio, Neunkirchen, Germany
  - Remix studio – AAV Studios, Melbourne; in 1987
  - Studio (tracks 12 to 15) – AAV Studios, Melbourne (recording); Studios 301, Sydney (mixing); in 1982
- Art work – Geoff Crosby

== Charts ==
Chart (1984)	Peak position
Australia (Kent Music Report)	89
New Zealand Albums Chart	37
