= The Way to Go Out =

Live album by Hunters & Collectors
- Released: 6 May 1985
- Recorded: 24–25 August 1984
- Venue: Earl's Court, St Kilda, Victoria, Australia
- Genre: Alternative rock, Aussie rock, college rock
- Length: 38:30
- Label: White/Mushroom
- Producer: Hunters & Collectors

Hunters & Collectors chronology
| The Jaws of Life (1984) | The Way to Go Out (1985) | Human Frailty (1986) |

The Way to Go Out is a 1985 live album by Australian rock band Hunters & Collectors, which was first released on 6 May 1985. It was recorded at Earl's Court in the Melbourne suburb of St Kilda in two days on 24 and 25 August 1984, and reached No. 76 on the Australian Kent Music Report Albums Chart and No. 21 on the New Zealand Albums Chart. Six of the eight tracks were from their 1984 album The Jaws of Life, and "Throw Your Arms Around Me" had been released as a non-album single. "Follow Me No More" had not been released in Australia but had been part of the UK-only single "Carry Me" in 1984. Under the shortened title "Follow Me" it would become the B-side to their "Say Goodbye" single a year after The Way to Go Out was released.

== Track listing ==
All tracks are written by John Archer, Geoff Crosby, Doug Falconer, Robert Miles, Mark Seymour, Michael Waters, except where otherwise noted

| No. | Title | Writer(s) | Length |
|---|---|---|---|
| 1. | "Throw Your Arms Around Me" | Archer, Crosby, Falconer, Jack Howard, Miles, Seymour, Waters | 5:08 |
| 2. | "The Way To Go Out" | Archer, Crosby, Falconer, Jack Howard, Miles, Seymour, Waters | 4:33 |
| 3. | "Little Chalkie" | Archer, Crosby, Falconer, Martin Lubran, Miles, Greg Perano, Seymour, Waters | 3:30 |
| 4. | "Follow Me No More" | | 6:20 |
| 5. | "I Couldn't Give It To You" | | 3:53 |
| 6. | "The Slab" | | 4:55 |
| 7. | "Carry Me" | | 4:17 |
| 8. | "I Believe" | Ray Charles | 5:54 |
| Total length: | | | 38:30 |

== Certifications ==
| Region | Certification | Certified units/sales |
|---|---|---|
| Australia (ARIA) | Gold | 35,000^{^} |
^{^} Shipments figures based on certification alone.
