= When the River Runs Dry =

Single by Hunters & Collectors

from the album Ghost Nation
- Released: September 1989
- Genre: Rock, pub rock
- Length: 5:02
- Label: White/Mushroom, Festival
- Songwriters: Mark Seymour, John Archer, Doug Falconer, Robert Miles, Jeremy Smith, Michael Waters, John Howard
- Producers: Gavin MacKillop, Hunters & Collectors

Hunters & Collectors singles chronology
"Back on the Breadline" (1988)	"When the River Runs Dry" (1989)	"Blind Eye" (1990)

"When the River Runs Dry" is the first single from the Australian pub rock band Hunters & Collectors' sixth album, Ghost Nation. The single was released on 25 September 1989. The song peaked at number 23 in Australia and number 41 in New Zealand. The band performed the song on Late Night With David Letterman in 1990.

== Background ==
Lead singer Mark Seymour stated the song was about middle class excess, the end of the world, rampant greed and the decline of western civilisation. The music video loosely investigated the encroaching effect of surveillance on daily life, but was accompanied with images of very attractive women engaged in a range of activities, from drinking champagne to hanging out clothes on a Hills Hoist.

== Reception ==
Reviewed at the time of release, Juke called it "an excellently performed, penned and produced single. Mark's vocal avoids excess and holds onto melody while the band creates a backdrop of sparse high-tensile dramatics that builds the song's interest and dynamics."

== Track listing ==
7" version
No.	Title	Writer(s)	Length
1.	"When the River Runs Dry" (edit)	Mark Seymour, John Archer, Doug Falconer, Robert Miles, Jeremy Smith, Michael Waters, John Howard	3:34
2.	"Two Roads"	Mark Seymour, John Archer, Doug Falconer, Robert Miles, Jeremy Smith, Michael Waters, John Howard	3:19

All tracks are written by Mark Seymour, John Archer, Doug Falconer, Robert Miles, Jeremy Smith, Michael Waters, John Howard.

12" version
No.	Title	Writer(s)	Length
1.	"When the River Runs Dry"	Mark Seymour, John Archer, Doug Falconer, Robert Miles, Jeremy Smith, Michael Waters, John Howard	5:02
2.	"The Price of Freedom"	Mark Seymour, John Archer, Doug Falconer, Robert Miles, Jeremy Smith, Michael Waters, John Howard
3.	"Wishing Well"	Mark Seymour, John Archer, Doug Falconer, Robert Miles, Jeremy Smith, Michael Waters, John Howard

== Charts ==
Chart (1989−1990)	Peak position
Australia (ARIA)	23
New Zealand (Recorded Music NZ)	41
