= Living Daylight =

EP by Hunters & Collectors
- Released: 13 April 1987
- Recorded: February 1987; AAV Studio 1, Melbourne
- Genre: Rock
- Length: 11:38
- Label: White/Mushroom (AUS); I.R.S. (US)
- Producer: Greg Edward, Hunters & Collectors

Hunters & Collectors chronology
Human Frailty (1986)	Living Daylight (1987)	What's a Few Men? (1987)

Living Daylight is the third extended play by Australian rock music group Hunters & Collectors, which was issued on 13 April 1987. It was co-produced by the group and Greg Edward, and reached No. 41 on the Australia Singles Chart and No. 25 on the New Zealand Singles Chart.

== Background ==
After their fourth studio album, Human Frailty, was released in Australia in April 1986, Hunters & Collectors toured North America twice that year. The band's line-up was John Archer on bass guitar, Doug Falconer on drums, John 'Jack' Howard on trumpet, Robert Miles providing live sound and art design, Mark Seymour on lead vocals and lead guitar, Jeremy Smith on French horn, and Michael Waters on trombone and keyboards. They returned to the studio in February 1987 and recorded three songs, co-produced by the band with Greg Edward. These tracks were released as their third extended play, Living Daylight, on 13 April 1987. Rock historian Ian McFarlane felt it was "something of a stop-gap measure". The three-track EP appeared on the Australian Top 50 Singles Chart, peaking at No. 41 on the Australia Singles Chart and No. 25 in New Zealand. Following its release Hunters & Collectors toured the US and Canada for three months. Upon their return to Australia they went back to the recording studios in September 1987 and recorded their fifth studio album, What's a Few Men?, also co-produced with Edward, which was released in November.

In July 1991 White Label Records re-issued the band's Human Frailty album on CD, which also included the three tracks from Living Daylight.

== Reception ==
Cash Box magazine said "Australia's Hunters and Collectors are going to ignite the college and alternative music worlds with this blistering, no holds barred, dance rock EP."

== Track listing ==
All lyrics are written by Mark Seymour; all music is composed by John Archer, Doug Falconer, Jack Howard, Robert Miles, Seymour, Jeremy Smith, Michael Waters; unless otherwise indicated

No.	Title	Length
1.	"Inside a Fireball"	4:03
2.	"Living Daylight"	3:13
3.	"January Rain"	4:25
Total length:		11:38

All lyrics are written by Seymour; all music is composed by Archer, Falconer, Howard, Miles, Seymour, Smith, Waters; unless otherwise indicated

Track listing for US release (I.R.S. Records)
No.	Title	Writer(s)	Length
1.	"Inside a Fireball"		4:02
2.	"Living Daylight"		3:10
3.	"January Rain"		4:25
4.	"The Slab" (Living Daylight remix)	Archer, Geoff Crosby, Falconer, Miles, Seymour, Waters	3:56
5.	"Carry Me" (Living Daylight remix)	Archer, Crosby, Falconer, Miles, Seymour, Waters	4:05
Total length:			19:35

== Personnel ==
Credited to:

Hunters & Collectors members

- John Archer – bass guitar
- Doug Falconer – drums
- John 'Jack' Howard – trumpet
- Robert Miles – live sound, art director
- Mark Seymour – vocals, lead guitar
- Jeremy Smith – French horn
- Michael Waters – trombone, keyboards

Recording details

- Producer – Hunters & Collectors, Greg Edward
- Engineer – Greg Edward
  - Assistant engineer – Michael Winlow (tracks 1, 2, 3), Renee Tinner (tracks 4, 5)
- Recording/mixing engineer – Robert Miles, Greg Edward
  - Remixing – Greg Edward (tracks 4, 5)
- Studio – AAV Studio 1, South Melbourne (recording, engineering, mixing)

Art works

- Art director – Robert Miles

== Charts ==
Chart (1987)	Peak position
Australia (Kent Music Report)	41
New Zealand Singles Chart	25
