= Juggernaut (Hunters & Collectors album) =

Studio album by Hunters & Collectors
- Released: 26 January 1998
- Recorded: 1997; Sing Sing Studios, Melbourne
- Genre: Australian rock
- Length: 51:18
- Label: White/Mushroom
- Producer: Hunters & Collectors, Kalju Tonuma, Mark Opitz

Hunters & Collectors chronology
Demon Flower (1994)	Juggernaut (1998)	Under One Roof (1998)

Singles from Juggernaut
- 1. "Suit Your Style" Released: May 1998

Juggernaut is the ninth and final studio album by Australian rock band Hunters & Collectors. The album, recorded in 1997, was co-produced by the group with Kalju Tonuma and Mark Opitz. It was released on 26 January 1998 on Mushroom's White Label. With its release, Hunters & Collectors announced they would disband after the Say Goodbye Tour – they gave their final performances in late March 1998. The album peaked at No. 36 on the ARIA Albums Chart and No. 48 on the New Zealand Albums Chart.

== Background ==
Hunters & Collectors issued Juggernaut on 26 January 1998 with the line-up of John Archer on bass guitar and backing vocals; Doug Falconer on drums, percussion, programming and backing vocals; Jack Howard on trumpet, keyboards and backing vocals; Barry Palmer on lead guitar; Mark Seymour on lead vocals; Jeremy Smith on guitars, French horn, keyboards, programming and backing vocals; and Michael Waters on trombone.

Almost four years earlier, in May 1994, the band released their eighth studio album, Demon Flower, which peaked at No. 2 on the ARIA Albums Chart. In 1995 they undertook an extensive tour of Europe in support of Demon Flower before taking a break. During this time they released a double live set, Living ... In Large Rooms and Lounges, in December that year. Also during the break Palmer formed a side-project, deadstar, which released a self-titled album in 1996 and a second album, Milk in 1997. Seymour issued his first solo album, King Without a Clue, in September 1997.

By this time a split was inevitable: there were external family commitments, long running internal disputes and a desire to simply 'call it a day'. Rather than a compilation album, the band recorded their last studio album, Juggernaut. It was produced by the group with Kalju Tonuma (Nick Barker, Frenzal Rhomb, deadstar) and Mark Opitz (The Angels, Cold Chisel, INXS).

When we decided that the band was breaking up, we thought it would be a great idea to do an original album. It's kinda cocky, but it's really good. It had to be the easiest album we've ever made. We didn't have the spectre of having a big overseas producer and it wasn't an album that was gonna make or break our career. It was just a record of songs that we wanted to record. And we knew that we weren't going to follow it with months and months of touring. We all felt really good about that.

— Barry Palmer

Hunters and Collectors launched their final twelve-week national Say Goodbye Tour. Their final public show was on 22 March 1998 and their final, invitation only, performance on 24 March 1998, both in Melbourne.

The album peaked at No. 36 on the ARIA Albums Chart and No. 48 on the New Zealand Albums Chart. The first track released from the album, "Higher Plane", in December 1997, was a promotional single only (with only 1,000 copies issued). The first official single was "Suit Your Style" in February 1998, which featured Paul Kelly on backing vocals and also co-writing the lyrics with Seymour. "Higher Plane" was commercially unsuccessful failing to chart in either country.

The album was re-issued by Liberation Blue on 11 August 2003.

== Track listing ==
All lyrics are written by Mark Seymour; all music is composed by John Archer, Doug Falconer, Jack Howard, Robert Miles, Barry Palmer, Seymour, Jeremy Smith, Michael Waters; unless otherwise indicated

Juggernaut
No.	Title	Length
1.	"True Believers" (produced by Mark Opitz)	4:42
2.	"Higher Plane"	4:09
3.	"When You Fall"	4:15
4.	"Wasted in the Sun"	4:58
5.	"Suit Your Style" (lyrics: Seymour, Paul Kelly; music:Archer, Falconer, Howard, Miles, Palmer, Seymour, Smith, Waters); (produced by Mark Opitz)	4:13
6.	"Titanic"	4:34
7.	"She's not Fooling Around"	4:14
8.	"Good Man Down"	3:45
9.	"Mother Hubbard"	3:50
10.	"Human Kind"	3:18
11.	"Those Days Are Gone"	3:53
12.	"Long Way to the Water"	4:07
13.	"True Believers (Reprise)" (Untitled Hidden track)	1:12

== Personnel ==
- John Archer — bass, backing vocals
- Doug Falconer - drums, percussion, programming, backing vocals
- Jack Howard - trumpet, keyboards, backing vocals
- Barry Palmer - guitars
- Mark Seymour - vocals
- Jeremy Smith - guitars, French horn, keyboards, programming, backing vocals
- Michael Waters - trombone
- Helen Mountfort - cello
- Kalju Tonuma - synthesiser

== Charts ==
Chart (1998)	Peak position
Australian Albums (ARIA)	36
New Zealand Albums (RMNZ)	48
