= Say Goodbye (Hunters & Collectors song) =

- 7" cover (White Label Records)

Single by Hunters & Collectors

from the album Human Frailty
- B-side: "Follow Me"
- Released: 17 February 1986
- Recorded: 1985; Allan Eaton Sound, St Kilda
- Genre: Pub rock
- Length: 3:48
- Label: White/Mushroom
- Songwriters: John Archer, Doug Falconer, Jack Howard, Robert Miles, Mark Seymour, Jeremy Smith, Michael Waters
- Producers: Gavin MacKillop, Hunters & Collectors

Hunters & Collectors singles chronology
"Throw Your Arms Around Me" (1984)	"Say Goodbye" (1986)	"Throw Your Arms Around Me" (1986)

Say Goodbye
- 12" version (White Label Records)

"Say Goodbye" was the lead single from Australian pub rockers, Hunters & Collectors' fourth studio album, Human Frailty. It was released ahead of the album on 17 February 1986 in both 7" and 12" formats. It peaked at No. 24 on the Australian Kent Music Report Singles Chart and No. 20 on the New Zealand Singles Chart. "Say Goodbye" was co-written by band members John Archer, Doug Falconer, Jack Howard, Robert Miles, Mark Seymour, Jeremy Smith, and Michael Waters.

== Background ==
Australian pub rockers Hunters & Collectors released "Say Goodbye" on 17 February 1986 ahead of their fourth studio album, Human Frailty which appeared in April. The track was co-written by band members John Archer on bass guitar, Doug Falconer on drums, Jack Howard on trumpet, Robert Miles on live sound, Mark Seymour on lead vocals and guitar, Jeremy Smith on French horn, and Michael Waters on keyboards and trombone.

Seymour explained writing the lyrics:

I wanted to portray a woman being aggressive ... I wanted to present the idea of dominating man. The first part of the song [which hinges on the woman speaking] I heard through a wall. The second part is something that I went through myself, where I am describing looking at a head on a pillow, someone you are really close to, and they are drifting away in their sleep. The distance between you and that person becomes more and more.

— Mark Seymour, Canberra Times, May 1986.

"Say Goodbye" was released in both 7" and 12" formats on White Label/Mushroom Records and, as with the album, was co-produced by Gavin MacKillop with the band. Each version had its own front cover art (see infobox), while the back cover art includes variations of their logo, a H & C symbol, where the "&" is stylised with twin snakes entwined around a hunting knife, a variation of a caduceus. The single peaked at No. 24 on the Australian Kent Music Report Singles Chart and No. 20 on the New Zealand Singles Chart.

The B-side, "Follow Me", was a re-recorded version of an earlier B-side, "Follow Me No More", which had appeared on "Carry Me" a United Kingdom-only single from 1984. "Follow Me No More" had been co-written by Archer, Falconer, Howard, Miles, Seymour, and Waters with then-keyboardist, Geoff Crosby. "Say Goodbye" appeared at No. 97 on the first Triple J Hottest 100 in 1989.

"Say Goodbye" and ""Is There Anybody in There?" were both featured on the soundtrack to the 1987 science fiction film, The Hidden, directed by Jack Sholder and starring Kyle MacLachlan, Michael Nouri and Claudia Christian. It was also included on the 2007 TV movie, Joanne Lees: Murder in the Outback, based on the real life disappearance of Peter Falconio. In 2013 a cover version of "Say Goodbye" by The Living End appeared on the tribute album, Crucible – The Songs of Hunters & Collectors.

== Reception ==
In May 1986 Pollyanna Sutton of The Canberra Times reviewed Human Frailty and on "Say Goodbye" she found that it "hinges on the powerful line 'You don't make me feel like I'm a woman anymore'". Sutton declared that Seymour had written "a line which he could sing in a pub with a lot of vulgarity that would get both guys and girls singing". Fellow music journalist, Ed Nimmervoll, praised the album and the band which had "discovered how to tap the unique vein they had unearthed; where, in a sweat-dripping venue packed to the rafters with a beer swilling macho rock fans the audience would and could at the top of their voices unselfconsciously sing along to" the line cited by Sutton. Contemporary singer-songwriter, Paul Kelly, recalled being at a gig "at The Venue ... where fifteen hundred blokes in the audience bellowed the song's punchline in unison ... What was going on in Australian pubs in the late eighties?"

In October 2010, it was described in the book, 100 Best Australian Albums, by the three authors, John O'Donnell, Toby Creswell, and Craig Mathieson: "[it] starts with a smash on the high hat and a quick drum pattern followed by a relentless, deep-throated riff on just the bass. The power trio push it into overdrive ... Seymour's vocal charges in with a story about a man and a woman fighting".

== Track listing ==
7" version
No.	Title	Writer(s)	Length
1.	"Say Goodbye"	John Archer, Doug Falconer, Jack Howard, Robert Miles, Mark Seymour, Jeremy Smith, Michael Waters	3:48
2.	"Follow Me" (Re-recorded version of "Follow Me No More")	Archer, Falconer, Geoff Crosby, Howard, Miles, Seymour, Waters	4:20

All tracks are written by John Archer, Doug Falconer, Jack Howard, Robert Miles, Mark Seymour, Jeremy Smith, Michael Waters; unless otherwise indicated

12" version
No.	Title	Length
1.	"Say Goodbye" (extended mix)	5:58
2.	"Say Goodbye" (7" version)	3:48
3.	"Follow Me" (Archer, Falconer, Geoff Crosby, Howard, Miles, Seymour, Waters)	4:20

== Personnel ==
Credited to:

Hunters & Collectors members

- John Archer – bass guitar
- Doug Falconer – drums
- John 'Jack' Howard – trumpet
- Robert Miles – live sound, art director
- Mark Seymour – vocals, lead guitar
- Jeremy Smith – French horn
- Michael Waters – trombone, keyboards

Recording details

- Producer – Hunters & Collectors, Gavin MacKillop
- Engineer – Gavin MacKillop
  - Assistant engineer – Doug Brady, Michael Streefkerk
- Recording/mixing engineer – Robert Miles
- Studio – Allan Eaton Sound, St Kilda (recording); AAV Studio One, Melbourne (mixing)

Art works

- Art director – Robert Miles

== Charts ==
Chart (1986)	Peak position
Australia (Kent Music Report)	24
New Zealand Singles Chart	20
