= Douglas Crabbe =

Australian murderer (born 1947)

Douglas John Edward Crabbe
- Born: 1947 (age 78–79)
- Occupation: Truck driver
- Status: Incarcerated
- Conviction: Murder x 5
- Penalty: 5 x life imprisonment; non-parole period 30 years

Douglas John Edward Crabbe (born 1947) is an Australian murderer currently imprisoned in Perth for a multiple murder which occurred when he drove his 25-tonne Mack truck into the crowded bar of a motel at the base of Uluṟu (Ayers Rock) on 18 August 1983. Five people were killed and sixteen seriously injured.

== Early life ==
Crabbe worked as a truck driver and began driving at the age of 14.

In February 1983 Crabbe was arrested and charged for assaulting a car load of youths at a service station near Tennant Creek. The youths were harassing the service station's console operator and also provoked Crabbe, who retaliated by jumping up and down on the bonnet of the victim's car.

On 24 March 1983, Crabbe attended a country and western function in Curtin Springs and became involved in two fights involving police. During Crabbe's later murder trial a witness testified that on his second ejection from the Curtin Springs establishment Crabbe was informed he was barred, to which he replied "If that's the case, I'll drive my truck through the pub." Crabbe denied that he had said this.

== The massacre ==
On the evening of 18 August 1983, Crabbe spent an hour at the Inland Motel bar before being refused service for intoxication. The bar was part of the Inland Motel, a short distance from the base of Uluru. It was on the eastern side of the rock, a few minutes walk from the camp site from which Azaria Chamberlain disappeared in 1980 but which had closed by August 1983. Crabbe, then aged 36, walked behind the bar and confronted bar staff before being involved in a fight and being ejected from the premises at 12.30am.

He then walked approximately 500 metres to his parked Mack truck, and drove it to the nearby Uluru Motel, where he unhitched one of two attached trailers. Crabbe then drove the truck and one trailer back to the Inland Motel. According to witness Martin Fisher:

Crabbe then maneuvered the 25 ton Semi and trailer, at speed, around a blind bend, through a car park, around a minibus, turned and drove it through the Besser brick wall into the crowded bar, crushing the people there. Leaving the engine running, he then got out of the truck, smiled down at one of his victims, stepped over some bodies and ran. This was at 1.10am. It had been 40 minutes between being thrown out and driving the truck into the bar. He was captured the next morning walking out of the bush 22 kilometres away.

It was estimated that fewer than 50 people were in the bar at the time of the crash. Many of the customers were construction workers from the nearby resort project of Yulara, which was being constructed to replace the Inland Motel and two neighbouring motels to allow the ground around Uluru to revert to its natural state.

Witnesses likened the impact of the truck hitting the motel to that of a bomb exploding. The truck had penetrated the building to the length of one trailer. The truck remained in place after impact, and was the only thing holding up the building's roof. After the crash the dining room adjacent to the bar became an emergency clinic for the injured. Four people were killed instantly in the crash. A fifth person died in a hospital in Alice Springs after surgeons worked for five and a half hours attempting to save her life. The 35-year-old woman had sustained severe internal injuries.

Crabbe's capture occurred at the Yulara Tourist Village construction site after a search by police and Aboriginal trackers; Nipper Winmarti was one of the trackers on the night. The Yulara settlement is a distance of several kilometres from the former site of the Inland Motel. William Hugh O'Neill, the catering manager from the Yulara Construction Camp, testified that he found Crabbe walking towards him near the construction camp on the morning of 18 August. Crabbe waited with O'Neill for police to arrive, asking the extent of the damage to the motel. Crabbe was informed by O'Neill that at least four people had died, including "one of my boys from the kitchen".

== Trials ==
At an October 1983 court hearing a police video taken on 18 August 1983 was shown to the court. It showed the bodies of the four people killed instantly - two men and two women - in the makeshift mortuary set up at the back of the motel. It also showed the damage to the bar area of the motel, with clothes and boots embedded in the ground under the truck and near its bloodstained bull bar, from which the officer who took the video said many of the dead had been pulled. Crabbe, charged with five counts of murder at the hearing, sat expressionless as the video was shown.

Ronald Slinn, a building manager from Yulara, told the court he was hit by the truck, jamming his left leg under the front axle. He managed to drag himself out and found his 45-year-old wife Patricia Slinn half underneath with her face downward; she had been killed instantly. A motel guest testified he saw a man, later identified from police photographs as Crabbe, running as if fleeing something. The man told the guest "Okay mate, I'm not going any further. I've gone far enough." After leaving to get help the guest found that the man had disappeared.

At the trial in March 1984 a witness testified that Crabbe had been rude and aggressive in the bar. This witness reported she had later seen Crabbe on the floor of the bar, being held down by three men. A second witness corroborated that a man had been involved in a scuffle with three men. The witness testified that after the truck crashed into the bar he saw the man who had been involved in the scuffle leave the truck's cabin and exit "very quickly" towards the rear of the truck via the gaping hole the truck left in the side of the building. The witness had been knocked down by the truck.

Crabbe offered no reason for his actions. At trial he pleaded memory loss from his removal of the second trailer until waking to the sound of the truck's exhaust amid the damaged bar room after impact. He was convicted of all five counts of murder by a jury. The judge sentenced him to the mandatory term of life imprisonment on each count of murder, each term to run consecutively. Asked if he had anything to say, Crabbe replied "No, nothing." Crabbe later appealed to the Federal Court of Australia, which found that the judge at the original trial had erred in his summing up to the jury and the convictions were set aside and a retrial ordered. The Crown then appealed that decision to the High Court of Australia, but this was dismissed.

Crabbe pleaded not guilty at his second trial which was held in the Darwin Supreme Court in 1985. This trial concluded on 7 October 1985 when a second jury convicted him on all five counts of murder. Crabbe was again sentenced to five consecutive terms of life imprisonment.

In 2004, the Northern Territory's mandatory 'life means life' legislation was repealed and an automatic 25-year non-parole period was fixed under the new laws. Later that year, the Northern Territory DPP applied to fix a longer non-parole period, and the Supreme Court of the Northern Territory increased that to a thirty-year minimum (the longest in the Northern Territory's history) backdated to 18 August 1983, the day of the murders and his arrest, to be served at the Alice Springs Correctional Centre.

In early 2005, Crabbe was moved to a prison in Perth, Western Australia after strong pleas from his family, including his sister, Flo.

Crabbe became eligible for release on parole on 18 August 2013 at the age of 66. His first parole application was rejected on 5 September 2013. Crabbe applied for parole in 2016, but despite the recommendation of the WA Parole Board that Crabbe be paroled, the Attorney-General overruled them and rejected the application. In 2023, the Attorney-General, John Quigley, accepted a Parole Board recommendation that Crabbe be moved to a minimum security prison to take part in a pre-release re-socialisation program.

== Legal significance ==
The High Court of Australia appeal of R v Crabbe established the common law precedent test for recklessness in regards to murder. The High Court of Australia ruled that to be guilty of murder, the defendant can be reckless in that they did the act knowing it was probable (meaning a substantial or real chance) that death or grievous bodily harm would occur as a result of their actions.

== In popular culture ==
The episode was documented by Australian rock band Hunters and Collectors on their 1984 album The Jaws of Life, with the lyrics of the opening track, "42 Wheels", sung from Crabbe's point of view. The original artwork of the vinyl LP includes the memorial plaque at the pub where the incident happened.

== See also ==
- List of Australian criminals
- Australian mass murders
