= Demon Flower =

Studio album by Hunters & Collectors
- Released: 16 May 1994
- Recorded: 1993–94; Sing Sing Studios, Melbourne
- Genre: Australian rock
- Length: 49:44
- Label: White/Mushroom
- Producer: Hunters & Collectors, Nick Mainsbridge

Hunters & Collectors chronology
Cut (1992)	Demon Flower (1994)	Juggernaut (1998)

Singles from Demon Flower
- 1. "Easy" Released: April 1994; 2. "Back in the Hole" Released: June 1994; 3. "Drop in the Ocean" Released: 24 October 1994

Demon Flower is the eighth studio album by Australian rock band, Hunters & Collectors and was released on 16 May 1994. It was co-produced by the band with Nick Mainsbridge, reaching No. 2 on the ARIA Albums Chart and was certified Gold by the Australian Recording Industry Association. It also peaked at No. 9 on the New Zealand Albums Chart.

== Background ==
Demon Flower was released by Hunters & Collectors as their eighth studio album on 16 May 1994, which was co-produced by the band with Nick Mainsbridge (The Triffids, Martha's Vineyard, Ratcat). The line-up of the group was John Archer on bass guitar, P.A., backing vocals; Doug Falconer on drums, backing vocals, programming, and percussion; Jack Howard on trumpet, keyboards and backing vocals; Robert Miles on live sound and art design; Barry Palmer on lead guitar; Mark Seymour on lead vocals and guitar; Jeremy Smith on French horn, keyboards, guitars and backing vocals; and Michael Waters on keyboards and trombone.

Archer told The Canberra Times' Naomi Mapstone that he felt the album had "less kind of studio stuff. I think it's a lot more adventurous, even though the last one sounded really full-on and dense, it was actually quite a safe record in a lot of ways ... We had a lot more fun with the sounds on this one". Australian musicologist, Ian McFarlane noticed that it "featured a stronger emphasis on guitars".

It debuted at No. 2 in Australia – their highest charting album – and No. 9 in New Zealand. Demon Flower's lead single "Easy", was issued a month ahead of the album's release and peaked at No. 38 on both countries singles charts. The three subsequent singles however all failed to chart. Seymour describes the band's frustration in the liner notes of Natural Selection, when discussing the fourth single, "The One and Only", "We’d launch into tracks like this one… an absolute live monster, and getting a response would be like trying to raise the dead. The radio recognition factor was crucial. Practically speaking, there wasn’t any radio after Holy Grail. Go figure."

The album was remastered and reissued by Liberation Music on 11 August 2003.

== Reception ==
Professional ratings
Review scores
Source	Rating
Allmusic	3/5 stars

Naomi Mapstone of The Canberra Times reviewed Demon Flower in June 1994 and noted that "[the band] seem to have, taken a deep breath, cleared their heads and, got back in touch with the vitality that was a hallmark of-earlier albums Human Frailty and The Jaws of Life". In December that year her fellow journalist, Nicole Leedham, rated Demon Flower as the Best Album of the year.

== Track listing ==
All lyrics are written by Mark Seymour; all music is composed by John Archer, Doug Falconer, Jack Howard, Robert Miles, Barry Palmer, Seymour, Jeremy Smith, Michael Waters; unless otherwise indicated

No.	Title	Length
1.	"Easy"	3:44
2.	"Panic in the Shade"	3:49
3.	"Back in the Hole"	4:30
4.	"The One and Only You"	3:05
5.	"Mr Bigmouth"	4:26
6.	"Courtship of America"	4:30
7.	"Drop in the Ocean"	3:46
8.	"Newborn"	4:03
9.	"Tender"	3:57
10.	"Desert Where Her Heart Is"	4:04
11.	"Betrayer"	3:58
12.	"Ladykiller"	5:48
Total length:		49:44

UK version only, [bonus track]
No.	Title	Length
13.	"Holy Grail"	3:43

== Charts ==
Chart (1994)	Peak position
Australian Albums (ARIA)	2
New Zealand Albums (RMNZ)	9

== Certifications ==
Region	Certification	Certified units/sales
Australia (ARIA)	Gold	35,000^{^}
^{^} Shipments figures based on certification alone.

== Personnel ==
Credited to:

Hunters & Collectors

- John Archer – bass guitar, P.A., backing vocals
- Doug Falconer – drums, percussion, programming, backing vocals
- Jack Howard – trumpet, keyboards, backing vocals
- Robert Miles- – live sound, art director
- Barry Palmer – lead guitar
- Mark Seymour – lead vocals, guitars, mandolin
- Jeremy Smith – French horn, guitars, keyboards, mandolin, backing vocals
- Michael Waters – trombone, keyboards

Production details

- Producer – Hunters & Collectors, Nick Mainsbridge (Absolute Productions)
- Engineer – Nick Mainsbridge
  - Assistant engineer – Lawrence Maddy, Anthony Cook
- Mastering – Don Bartley
- Mixed by – Mark Freegard for 140db
  - Assistant mixer – Kalju Tonuma
- Studios – Sing Sing Studios, Melbourne (recording); Studio's 301, Sydney (mastering); Platinum Studios, Melbourne (mixing)

=== Track-by-track instrument credits ===
"Easy"

- Archer – bass guitar
- Falconer – drums
- Howard – keyboards
- Palmer – lead guitar
- Seymour – lead vocals, backing vocals, rhythm guitar
- Smith – guitar, backing vocals
- Waters – trombone
- Mark Freegard – rhythm guitar

"Panic in the Shade"

- Archer – bass guitar
- Howard – trumpet
- Palmer – lead guitar, noise guitar
- Seymour – lead vocals, backing vocals
- Smith – big riff, drum programming, noise guitar, rhythm guitar

"Back in the Hole"

- Archer – bass guitar
- Falconer – drums
- Palmer – lead guitar, buzz guitar
- Seymour – lead vocals, backing vocals, acoustic guitar
- Smith – guitar
- Waters – keyboards

"The One and Only You"

- Archer – bass guitar
- Falconer – drums
- Howard – trumpet
- Palmer – lead guitar, slide guitar
- Seymour – lead vocals, guitar
- Seymour – lead vocals, organ
- Waters – trombone

"Mr. Bigmouth"

- Archer – bass guitar
- Falconer – drums
- Howard – trumpet
- Palmer – lead guitar
- Seymour – lead vocals
- Smith – keyboards
- Waters – trombone

"Courtship of America"

- Archer – bass guitar
- Falconer – drums
- Howard – trumpet
- Palmer – acoustic guitar, electric guitar
- Seymour – lead vocals, acoustic guitar
- Smith – keyboards, French horn, string programming, guitar, tambourine

"Drop in the Ocean"

- Archer – bass guitar
- Falconer – drums
- Palmer – fuzz guitar, tremolo
- Seymour – lead vocals, backing vocals, rhythm guitar
- Smith – guitar

"Newborn"

- Archer – bass guitar
- Falconer – drums
- Howard – trumpet
- Palmer – distorted guitar
- Seymour – lead vocals, acoustic guitar
- Smith – mandolin, French horn, clean guitar, acoustic guitar, hammond, backing vocals
- Waters – trombone

"Tender"

- Archer – bass guitar
- Falconer – drums
- Howard – keyboards
- Palmer – lead guitar
- Seymour – lead vocals, backing vocals, guitar
- Smith – guitar

"Desert Where Her Heart Is"

- Archer – bass guitar
- Falconer – drums
- Howard – trumpet
- Palmer – guitars
- Seymour – lead vocals, backing vocals, rhythm guitar
- Smith – acoustic guitar, French horn
- Waters – trombone

"Betrayer"

- Archer – bass guitar
- Falconer – drums
- Howard – trumpet
- Palmer – lead guitar
- Seymour – lead vocals
- Smith – guitar, French horn
- Waters – trombone

"Ladykiller"

- Archer – bass guitar
- Falconer – drums, drum programming, percussion
- Howard – trumpet
- Palmer – electric guitar, slide guitar
- Seymour – lead vocals, mandolin, acoustic guitar
- Smith – acoustic guitar, piano, mandolin, string programming
- Nick Mainsbridge- drum programming
