= The Sell-In =

The Sell-in
- Author: Craig Mathieson
- Language: English
- Subject: Australia alternative music
- Genre: Non-fiction
- Publisher: Allen & Unwin
- Publication date: 1 November 2000
- Publication place: Australia
- Pages: 280 pp
- ISBN: 978-1-86508-412-1
- OCLC: 48435459
- Dewey Decimal: 781.66/0994 21
- LC Class: ML3534 .M432 2000

The Sell-in: How the Music Business Seduced Alternative Rock is a book by Australian music journalist, Craig Mathieson. It documents the rise of the Australia's alternative music scene and how that success attracted the interest of the music industry's major labels. Gideon Haigh of Australian Book Review discussed it in December 2000.

== Reception ==
The Sell-in: How the Music Business Seduced Alternative Rock was reviewed by The Age's Patrick Donovan, who generally praised Mathieson's writing as "punchy chronological narrative that never dwells on a subject for too long." Donovan disputes Mathieson's claim that the music industry's seduction of indie rock began in 1990 – he argues for a diffuse beginning some years earlier. The Sell-in's other faults included "[it] may push its thesis at times, be Sydney-centric, contain spelling mistakes and give some players credit at the expense of others." Nevertheless "it is essential and entertaining reading."

Phil Tripp of In Music & Media observed "[it] is well researched, grippingly written and quite accurate in its portrayals of the events of the past ten years that shaped the indie industry as well as shot many of its artists." Tripp avers that Australian artists of that era had considerable talent, whereas "we have a dearth of managerial talent" with too many clowns "in positions of power at the record companies and publishers who exploit the talent."
