= Hunters & Collectors (album) =

Studio album by Hunters & Collectors
- Released: 26 July 1982
- Recorded: October 1981 – April 1982; AAV Studios, Melbourne
- Genre: Rock
- Length: 49:48
- Label: White/Mushroom
- Producer: Hunters & Collectors

Hunters & Collectors chronology
Hunters & Collectors (1982)	The Fireman's Curse (1983)

Singles from Hunters & Collectors
- 1. "Talking to a Stranger" Released: 12 July 1982

Hunters & Collectors
- 1983 US version (Oz/A&M)

Hunters & Collectors is the self-titled debut studio album by Australian rock band, Hunters & Collectors, which was released on 26 July 1982. It was produced by the band with Tony Cohen as audio engineer. The album peaked at No. 21 on the Australian Kent Music Report Albums Chart and No. 14 on the New Zealand Albums Chart. The album's first single, "Talking to a Stranger", was released ahead of the album on 12 July, and was accompanied by a music video directed by film maker Richard Lowenstein, but it did not reach the Top 50 on the related singles chart.

== Background ==
Hunters & Collectors was recorded by Australian rock band, Hunters & Collectors from October 1981 to the following April. The group had formed earlier in 1981 with the line up of former members of Jetsonnes: John Archer on electric bass; Doug Falconer on drums; Robert Miles as live sound and art director; Mark Seymour on guitar and lead vocals; and Ray Tosti-Guerra on guitar and vocals; joined by Geoff Crosby on keyboards; and Greg Perano on percussion (ex-True Wheels). They were expanded by a horn section, later dubbed Horns of Contempt, comprising Nigel Crocker and Michael Waters, both on trombone; Jack Howard, Andy Lynn and Chris Malherbe, each on trumpet; and Jeremy Smith on French horn.

Mushroom Records specifically formed a new alternative label, White Label Records, when they signed Hunters & Collectors. Their first release was World of Stone, a three-track extended play in January 1982. Hunters & Collectors, followed on 26 July 1982 and was produced by the group with Sydney-based engineer Tony Cohen recording at AAV Studios, Melbourne. The album peaked at No. 21 on the Australian Kent Music Report Albums Chart. Their first single from the album, "Talking to a Stranger" was released ahead of the album on 12 July, and was accompanied by a music video directed by film maker Richard Lowenstein, but it did not reach the Top 50 singles chart.

By this time, Tosti-Guerra was replaced by Martin Lubran on guitar and the Horns of Contempt were reduced to three, Howard, Smith and Waters. In July this line up contributed four new tracks for the United States version of Hunters & Collectors, which retained three tracks from the Australian version. The co-producer for the new tracks was Mike Howlett, which were released in Australia as the group's second extended play, Payload, on 6 December 1982. Howlett had also remixed "Talking to a Stranger" for the US version of the album.

In early 1983, the band began a six-month tour of the United Kingdom and signed to Virgin Records, who combined their album, Hunters & Collectors and the Payload EP into a UK LP re-release of Hunters & Collectors. The US version of the album was released on the Oz Records label, the US imprint of Mushroom Records and was distributed by A&M Records. In July 1991 the album was re-issued on compact disc, which included all three tracks from World of Stone. In August 2003 the latter version was re-released by Liberation Blue.

== Recording ==
4-track Demos were done with Tony Cohen two months before entering the studio, at the home of fellow producer Chris Thompson. The studio was booked for a month, which Cohen found surprisingly generous for a debut album. Bassist Archer, who ran a PA company, set up the PA for the band to play live to an audience. Cohen said, "The entire album was recorded that way. There was no applause, the audience was there to witness a record being made. There were so many members, I couldn't find space to isolate them all."

== Reception ==
Professional ratings
Review scores
Source	Rating
Allmusic	3.5/5 stars

Some years later, Allmusic's Bill Cassel found Hunters & Collectors (US version) to be "seething art funk comparable to a harder-edged Shriekback or less political Gang of Four"; at the time of its launch, Shriekback had only released one EP. Their lyrics "are stream-of-consciousness poetics that range from the merely incomprehensible to the downright silly". Seymour's vocal delivery "does not sound entirely comfortable" while the "muscular rhythms" of Archer and Falconer "motor right over the young band's shortcomings".

Australian musicologist, Ian McFarlane, felt that the album provided "one of the band's early classics" with the lead single, "Talking to a Stranger", and lauded its "radical film clip" by Lowenstein. The track was "an expression of alienation and sheer anguish". While fellow music journalist, Ed Nimmervoll, opined "[its] theme of alienation and anguish is one the band would return to, but for the moment the group's emphasis was the free-form side of their work".

== Track listing ==
The original release (White Label L-42002) was as an LP plus a 12" single.

All tracks are written by John Archer, Geoff Crosby, Doug Falconer, Robert Miles, Greg Perano, Mark Seymour, Ray Tosti-Guerra (unless otherwise noted).

Side 1
No.	Title	Length
1.	"Talking to a Stranger"	7:18
2.	"Alligator Engine" (Perano, Tosti-Guerra, Seymour, Miles)	5:45
3.	"Skin of Our Teeth"	7:51

Side 2
No.	Title	Length
1.	"Scream Who"	4:04
2.	"Junket Head"	5:39
3.	"Boo Boo Kiss"	5:39

Side 3
No.	Title	Length
1.	"Tender Kinder Baby"	4:38

Side 4
No.	Title	Length
1.	"Run Run Run" (Archer, Crosby, Falconer, Seymour)	8:54

United States version on Oz Records/A&M Records
No.	Title	Writer(s)	Length
1.	"Tow Truck"	John Archer, Geoff Crosby, Doug Falconer, Martin Lubran, Robert Miles, Greg Perano, Mark Seymour	4:55
2.	"Drop Tank"	Archer, Crosby, Falconer, Lubran, Miles, Perano, Seymour	4:53
3.	"Mouthtrap"	Archer, Crosby, Falconer, Miles, Perano, Seymour	4:02
4.	"Lumps of Lead"	Archer, Crosby, Falconer, Lubran, Miles, Perano, Seymour	4:08
5.	"Talking to a Stranger"	Archer, Crosby, Falconer, Miles, Perano, Seymour, Ray Tosti-Guerra	7:23
6.	"Scream Who"	Archer, Crosby, Falconer, Miles, Perano, Seymour, Tosti-Guerra	4:06
7.	"Run Run Run"	Archer, Crosby, Falconer, Miles, Perano, Seymour, Tosti-Guerra	9:08
Total length:			38:35

All tracks are written by John Archer, Geoff Crosby, Doug Falconer, Robert Miles, Greg Perano, Mark Seymour, Ray Tosti-Guerra (unless otherwise noted)

Australian CD reissue on White Label Records
No.	Title	Length
1.	"Talking to a Stranger"	7:18
2.	"Alligator Engine" (Perano, Tosti-Guerra, Seymour, Miles)	5:45
3.	"Skin of Our Teeth"	7:51
4.	"Scream Who"	4:04
5.	"Junket Head"	5:39
6.	"Boo Boo Kiss"	5:39
7.	"Tender Kinder Baby"	4:38
8.	"Run Run Run" (Archer, Crosby, Falconer, Seymour)	8:54
9.	"World of Stone"	7:31
10.	"Watcher"	4:42
11.	"Loinclothing"	5:28
Total length:		67:29

== Personnel ==
Credited to:

Hunters & Collectors members

- John Archer – electric bass
- Geoff Crosby – keyboards
- Doug Falconer – drums
- Robert Miles – live sound, art director
- Greg Perano – percussion
- Mark Seymour – guitar, lead vocals
- Ray Tosti-Guerra – guitar, vocals

Horns of Contempt members

- Nigel Crocker – trombone
- Jack Howard – trumpet
- Andy Lynn – trumpet
- Chris Malherbe – trumpet
- Jeremy Smith – French horn
- Michael Waters – trombone

Production details

- Producer – Hunters & Collectors
- Engineer – Tony Cohen (except "Boo Boo Kiss"), Jim Barton (track "Boo Boo Kiss")
- Mixer – Robert Miles, Jim Barton
- Studios – AAV Studios, Melbourne

== Charts ==
Chart (1982)	Peak position
Australia (Kent Music Report)	21
New Zealand Albums Chart	14

== Release history ==
Region	Date	Label	Format	Catalogue
Australia/New Zealand	26 July 1982	White/Mushroom	Vinyl album	L42002
US/Canada	1983	Oz/A&M	Vinyl album	SP-04973
UK/Europe	1983	Virgin	Vinyl album	VS 566-12
Australia	July 1991	White/Mushroom	CD	D19490
Australia	August 2003	Liberation Blue	CD	BLUE020.2
