= Payload (EP) =

EP by Hunters & Collectors
- Released: 29 November 1982
- Recorded: July–August 1982
- Genre: Rock
- Length: 18:13
- Label: White/Mushroom
- Producers: Mike Howlett, Hunters & Collectors

Hunters & Collectors chronology
World of Stone (1982)	Payload (1982)	Living Daylight (1987)

Singles from Payload
- 1. "Lumps of Lead" Released: November 1982

Payload is the second extended play by Australian rock music group, Hunters & Collectors, which was issued on 29 November 1982. It was co-produced by the group and Mike Howlett; and reached No. 31 on the New Zealand Singles Chart but did not reach the top 100 in Australia. Its lead single, "Lumps of Lead", was also released in November but did not chart in either Australia or New Zealand despite a music video by film maker, Richard Lowenstein.

== Background ==
Payload is a four-track extended play released by Australian rock group, Hunters & Collectors, in November 1982. The group had formed in the previous year and by mid-1982 consisted of John Archer on bass guitar; Geoff Crosby on keyboards; Doug Falconer on drums; Robert Miles as live sound and art director; Greg Perano on percussion; Mark Seymour on guitar and lead vocals; and newly joined Martin Lubran on guitar. Their brass section, Horns of Contempt, consisted of Jack Howard on trumpet, Jeremy Smith on French horn, and Michael Waters on trombone.

The EP was co-produced by fellow Australian Mike Howlett, a former member of the band Gong, and the group. In February it reached No. 31 on the New Zealand Singles Chart, but it did not reach the top 100 on the Australian Kent Music Report Singles Chart. Film maker, Richard Lowenstein, directed the music video for the lead single, "Lumps of Lead", but it did not chart in Australia or New Zealand. In 1983 the band toured the United Kingdom for six months and signed with Virgin Records. The label compiled three tracks from the band's debut album, Hunters & Collectors (July 1982), and all four tracks from Payload into an album also called Hunters & Collectors, which was released in April 1983. A three-record deal with Virgin was broken when band members insulted the label's executive, Simon Draper, by telling him that he was "a poncy little blueblood" with no faith in them.

== Track listing ==
All tracks are written by John Archer, Geoff Crosby, Doug Falconer, Martin Lubran, Robert Miles, Greg Perano, and Mark Seymour; unless otherwise indicated

No.	Title	Length
1.	"Tow Truck"	4:55
2.	"Drop Tank"	4:54
3.	"Mouthtrap" (Archer, Crosby, Falconer, Miles, Perano, Seymour)	4:03
4.	"Lumps of Lead"	4:12
5.	"Talking to a Stranger"	7:30
6.	"Scream Who"	4:09
7.	"Run Run Run"	9:05

== Charts ==
Chart (1982/83)	Peak position
New Zealand Singles Chart	31

== Personnel ==
Credited to:

Hunters & Collectors members

- John Archer – bass guitar, backing vocals
- Geoff Crosby – keyboards, Korg MS-20
- Doug Falconer – drums
- Martin Lubran – guitar
- Robert Miles – live sound, art director
- Greg Perano – percussion
- Mark Seymour – guitar, lead vocals

Horns of Contempt members

- Jack Howard – trumpet
- Jeremy Smith – French horn
- Michael Waters – trombone

Additional musicians

- Karen Ansel, Christine Bodey, Margot Dual, La-Chelle Gera – backing vocals on "Drop Tank"

Production details

- Producer – Mike Howlett, Hunters & Collectors
- Engineer – Christo Curtis, Jim Barton
- Studio – AAV Studios, Melbourne (recording); Studios 301, Sydney (mixing)
- Cover art – Robert Miles
