= Throw Your Arms Around Me =

1984 single by Hunters & Collectors

- 1984 single cover

Single by Hunters & Collectors
- B-side: "Unbeliever"
- Released: November 1984
- Recorded: October 1984
- Studio: John & Paula's Hardware St. Studio
- Genre: Australian rock
- Length: 3:29
- Label: Mushroom
- Songwriters: John Archer; Geoffrey Crosby; Douglas Falconer; Jack Howard; Robert Miles; Mark Seymour; Michael Waters
- Producers: Hunters & Collectors

Hunters & Collectors singles chronology
| "Carry Me" (1984) | "Throw Your Arms Around Me" (1984) | "Say Goodbye" (1986) |

"Throw Your Arms Around Me" is a song by Australian rock band Hunters & Collectors first released as a single in November 1984 by White Label for Mushroom Records. A re-recorded version of the song later appeared on the band's 1986 album Human Frailty. Written by bass guitarist John Archer, keyboardist Geoffrey Crosby, drummer Douglas Falconer, trumpet player Jack Howard, recorder/mixing engineer Robert Miles, vocalist/lead guitarist Mark Seymour and trombone player Michael Waters. The song captures the intensity of sensual love at the same time portraying its fleeting nature with lyrics including "And we may never meet again, So shed your skin and let's get started".

In January 2018, as part of Triple M's "Ozzest 100", the 'most Australian' songs of all time, "Throw Your Arms Around Me" was ranked number 19. In 2025, the song placed 25 in the Triple J Hottest 100 of Australian Songs.

== Background ==
The line-up of Mark Seymour (guitar, vocals), John Archer (bass guitar), Doug Falconer (drums) Geoff Crosby (keyboards) and Robert Miles, (sound engineer and art director) with Jack Howard on trumpet and Michael Waters on trombone recorded the first version of "Throw Your Arms Around Me" for a single-only release in 1984, with "Unbeliever" as its B-side; all members were credited as the song's writers.

A live version of "Throw Your Arms Around Me" appeared on their 1985 album The Way to Go Out. Their breakthrough commercial success in Australia came in 1986, with the release of the album Human Frailty, which featured a re-recording of the song. In 1990, a slower, more acoustically introspective version of the single was recorded and released from their compilation album Collected Works. The promotional video was a mosaic of all their previous videos.

Mark Seymour described writing for Human Frailty:

I was in a relationship with a woman I was very much in love with and she was the inspiration. I wrote virtually all the lyrics on Human Frailty about my relationship with her...Throw Your Arms Around Me was the first song I wrote that wasn't angry. And because it was so out of the square, we didn't record it particularly well...One time, we played it at The Palace, to about 2,000 people who just went off. We finally got it right, so we recorded it again. I think we did about four versions of it.

— Mark Seymour

== Cover versions ==
A shortened version was performed by Crowded House (a band whose members include Mark Seymour's brother Nick) at their Farewell to the World concert in 1996 and earlier was covered by the band on MTV Unplugged.

Paul McDermott covered the song several times, most famously along side Richard Fidler backed by a full choir on the 1997 Good News Week GNW New Years Eve special.

The song was covered by Pearl Jam, with the lyric "I will kiss you in four places" changed to "I will kiss you in 155 places" by vocalist Eddie Vedder. Neil Finn attributes this change to Vedder's having heard one of Crowded House's many cover versions of the song before hearing the original. Finn typically changes the number each time he performs it.

In 2004, Original Yellow Wiggle, Greg Page recorded a version of the song on his album of the same name. In 2013, a cover version Vedder and Finn as a duo appeared on the tribute album Crucible – The Songs of Hunters & Collectors.

== Legacy ==
"Throw Your Arms Around Me" remained one of the more popular songs in Australia for years, being voted number 2, 2 and 4 on the Triple J Hottest 100 in 1989, 1990 and 1991. Prior to 1992, songs from any year were eligible for inclusion in the hottest 100. It placed 2nd in Triple J's Hottest 100 of All Time in 1998 and placed 25 in the Triple J Hottest 100 of Australian Songs in 2025.

In May 2001 the Australasian Performing Right Association (APRA), as part of its 75th Anniversary celebrations, named "Throw Your Arms Around Me" as one of the Top 30 Australian songs of all time.

Junkee noted, "Nobody that has witnessed this song being sung drunkenly in a pub by a hundred people, arms linked, can deny its hold over the Australian psyche."

== Track listing ==
All tracks written by John Archer, Geoffrey Crosby, Douglas Falconer, Jack Howard, Robert Miles, Mark Seymour and Michael Waters, according to APRA.

1984 version:

1. "Throw Your Arms Around Me" – 3:29
2. "Unbeliever" – 5:19

"Throw Your Arms Around Me"
- 1986 single cover

Single by Hunters & Collectors

from the album Human Frailty
- B-side: "Who's on Left?"; "When the Truth Comes Out"
- Released: April 1986
- Recorded: 1985
- Studio: Allan Easton's Studio, St Kilda
- Genre: Australian rock
- Length: 3:52
- Label: Mushroom
- Songwriters: John Archer; Geoffrey Crosby; Douglas Falconer; John Howard; Robert Miles; Mark Seymour; Michael Waters
- Producers: Gavin MacKillop; Hunters & Collectors

Hunters & Collectors singles chronology
| "Say Goodbye" (1986) | "Throw Your Arms Around Me" (1986) | "Everything's on Fire" (1986) |

== Charts ==
| Chart (1984–86) | Peak position |
|---|---|
| Australia (Kent Music Report) | 34 |
| New Zealand (Recorded Music NZ) | 28 |

"Throw Your Arms Around Me"

Single by Hunters & Collectors

from the album Collected Works
- B-side: "Something to Believe In" / "When the Truth Comes Calling"
- Released: November 1990
- Recorded: 1989; Platinum Studios, Melbourne
- Genre: Australian rock
- Label: White/Mushroom
- Songwriters: John Archer, Geoffrey Crosby, Douglas Falconer, John Howard, Robert Miles, Mark Seymour, Michael Waters
- Producers: Clive Martin, Hunters & Collectors

Hunters & Collectors singles chronology
| "Love All Over Again" (1990) | "Throw Your Arms Around Me" (1990) | "Where Do You Go?" (1991) |

== Personnel ==
Credited to:

Hunters & Collectors members

- John Archer — bass guitar
- Geoffrey Crosby — keyboards
- Douglas Falconer — drums
- John 'Jack' Howard — trumpet
- Mark Seymour — vocals, lead guitar
- Michael Waters — trombone

Recording details

- Producer — Hunters & Collectors
  - Gavin MacKillop, Hunters & Collectors (1986 version)
- Recording/mixing engineer — Robert Miles
- Studio — John & Paula's Hardware St. Studio, Planetbrain Enterprises;
  - Allan Eaton's Studio, St Kilda (1986 version)

Artworks

- Art director — Robert Miles
- Photography — Lauritzphoto (1986 front cover)
