= Ghost Nation (album) =

Studio album by Hunters & Collectors
- Released: 27 November 1989
- Recorded: May−September 1989
- Studio: Platinum Studios, Melbourne
- Genre: Rock
- Length: 43:20
- Label: White/Mushroom
- Producer: Clive Martin, Hunters & Collectors

Hunters & Collectors chronology
What's a Few Men? (1987)	Ghost Nation (1989)	Cut (1992)

Singles from Ghost Nation
- 1. "When the River Runs Dry" Released: 25 September 1989; 2. "Turn a Blind Eye" aka "Blind Eye" Released: 8 January 1990; 3. "The Way You Live" Released: 23 April 1990; 4. "Love All Over Again" Released: August 1990

Ghost Nation is the sixth studio album by Australian rock band, Hunters & Collectors. It was co-produced by the band with Clive Martin and issued on White/Mushroom Records on 27 November 1989. It reached No. 10 on the ARIA Albums Chart, No. 29 in New Zealand and No. 31 in Sweden.

The album helped Hunters & Collectors win the award of Australian Band of the Year (1990) by Rolling Stone Australia. The band were nominated for six awards at the Fourth Annual ARIA Music Awards in 1990, but they won just one category – Best Cover Art for Ghost Nation by Robert Miles.

== Background ==
Hunters & Collectors line up in 1987 was John Archer on bass guitar, Doug Falconer on drums, Jack Howard on trumpet, Robert Miles on live sound, Mark Seymour on lead vocals and guitar, Jeremy Smith on French horn, and Michael Waters on keyboards and trombone. Early in 1988 Barry Palmer (also a member of Harem Scarem, ex-Stephen Cummings Band) joined the group on guitar. Ghost Nation, their sixth studio album, was co-produced by the band with Clive Martin. It was released in November 1989 on White Label/Mushroom in Australia and New Zealand and Atlantic in Europe and North America, and was their second Australian Top Ten appearance on the ARIA Albums Chart, peaking at No 10 in February 1990. In New Zealand it reached the top 30 and also charted in Sweden reaching No. 31 on the Sverigetopplistan. It provided four singles, beginning with "When the River Runs Dry", appearing in September and peaking at No. 23 in Australia in December and No. 5 on Billboard Modern Rock Tracks in 1990. The album also includes a cover version of Eric Gradman: Man and Machine's 1979 single, "Crime of Passion".

The album was remastered and re-issued by Liberation Records on 7 July 2003.

== Reception ==
Professional ratings
Review scores
Source	Rating
Allmusic	2/5 stars

Australian musicologist, Ian McFarlane, enthused "[it] was perhaps the band's finest album to date". However Allmusic's Mike DeGagne declared that it was "one of this Australian band's weakest attempts, [it] suffers greatly from bland lyrics and gray instrumental work through the entirety of the album". Ed St John in Rolling Stone Australia states "The first thing that strikes me about Ghost Nation is its sound. The band plays with impressive spirit, the grooves flowing with a spontaneous grace that far surpasses much of their earlier work. Moreover the music is beautifully recorded and intelligently, thoughtfully mixed."

The album helped Hunters & Collectors win the award of Australian Band of the Year (1990) by Rolling Stone Australia. The band were nominated for six awards at the ARIA Music Awards of 1990, but won just one category – Best Cover Art for Ghost Nation by Miles.

== Track listing ==
All lyrics are written by Mark Seymour; all music is composed by John Archer, Doug Falconer, Jack Howard, Robert Miles, Barry Palmer, Seymour, Jeremy Smith, Michael Waters; unless otherwise indicated

No.	Title	Writer(s)	Length
1.	"When The River Runs Dry"		5:02
2.	"Blind Eye" aka "Turn a Blind Eye"		4:29
3.	"Love All Over Again"		3:55
4.	"Crime of Passion"	Eric Gradman, Elizabeth Reed	5:22
5.	"You Stole My Thunder"		3:27
6.	"Ghost Nation"		4:11
7.	"The Way You Live"		3:48
8.	"Gut Feeling"		4:25
9.	"Lazy Summer Day"		3:38
10.	"Running Water"		5:05

== Charts ==
Chart (1989/90)	Peak position
Australian Albums (ARIA)	10
New Zealand Albums (RMNZ)	29
Swedish Albums (Sverigetopplistan)	21

== Certifications ==
Region	Certification	Certified units/sales
Australia (ARIA)	Platinum	70,000^{^}
^{^} Shipments figures based on certification alone.

== Personnel ==
Credited to:

Hunters & Collectors

- John Archer – bass guitar
- Doug Falconer – drums, percussion
- John "Jack" Howard – trumpet, keyboards
- Robert Miles – live sound, art director
- Barry Palmer – lead guitar
- Mark Seymour – lead vocals, guitar
- Jeremy Smith – French horn, keyboards, guitar
- Michael Waters – trombone, keyboards

Additional musicians

- Jenn Anderson – strings
- Linda Bull – backing vocals
- Vika Bull – backing vocals
- Chris Dyer – trumpet
- Neil Finn – backing vocals
- Alex Pertout – percussion
- Jex Saarelaht – keyboards
- Ben Taylor – washboard
- Cindy Watkins – strings
- Paul Williamson – saxophone

Production details

- Producer – Hunters & Collectors, Clive Martin
- Engineer – Clive Martin
  - Assistant engineers – Peter Edwards, Tony Salter (Platinum Studios); Joe Pirrera (Hit Factory)
- Mixing – Eric Thorngren
- Studio – Platinum Studios, Melbourne (recording); The Hit Factory, New York (mixing)
- Mastering - Rick O'Neil Festival Records
- Cover art – Robert Miles
