= Craig Mathieson =

Australian music journalist and writer

- Born: 1971 (age 54–55); Australia
- Occupations: Journalist, editor, author
- Writing career
- Subject: Rock music
- Notable work: The Sell-In: How the Music Business Seduced Alternative Rock

Craig Mathieson (born 1971) is an Australian music journalist and writer. His books include Hi Fi Days (1996), The Sell-In in (2000) and the 100 Best Australian Albums in 2010, with Toby Creswell and John O'Donnell.

== Biography ==
Craig Mathieson was born in 1971 and grew up in rural Victoria. At the age of 18, he started writing professionally about rock & roll, contributing to daily newspapers and rock magazines both in Australia and overseas. He became the editor of Juice, one of Australia's leading pop culture magazines, at 23.

Hi Fi Days (1996) is a biography of three leading Australian bands, Silverchair, Spiderbait and You Am I. The Sell-In (2000) documents the rise of Australia's alternative music scene and how that success attracted the interest of the music industry's major labels.

Since October 2010, Mathieson has worked freelance for a number of publications, including the magazines Rolling Stone, The Bulletin, GQ, and HQ and national newspapers The Age, and The Sydney Morning Herald.

Since March 2012, Mathieson has been the film critic for the Sunday Age.

== Bibliography ==
=== Books ===
- Mathieson, Craig (1996). Hi fi days : the future of Australian rock. St Leonards, NSW: Allen & Unwin.
- — (2000). The sell-in : how the music business seduced alternative rock. St Leonards, NSW: Allen & Unwin.
- Mathieson, Craig (2009). Playlisted: Everything You Need to Know About Australian Music Right Now. St Leonards, NSW: Allen & Unwin. ISBN 978-1-74223-017-7.
- Mathieson, Craig; Creswell, Toby; O'Donnell, John (2010). 100 Best Australian Albums. Prahran, Vic: Hardie Grant Books. ISBN 978-1-74066-955-9.

=== Essays and reporting ===
- Mathieson, Craig (May 2015). "The fight in Beth Hart". Close-Up. Rolling Stone (Australia). 762: 78–79.
- — (May 2015). "The Prodigy's defiant stand". Rolling Stone (Australia). 762: 16–17.
