= The Fireman's Curse =

Studio album by Hunters & Collectors
- Released: 5 September 1983
- Recorded: June–July 1983; Conny's Studio, Neunkirchen, Germany
- Genre: Rock
- Length: 40:04
- Labels: White/Mushroom, Virgin
- Producers: Konrad Plank, Hunters & Collectors

Hunters & Collectors chronology
Hunters & Collectors (1982)	The Fireman's Curse (1983)	The Jaws of Life (1984)

Singles from Hunters & Collectors
- 1. "Judas Sheep" Released: August 1983; 2. "Sway" Released: November 1983

The Fireman's Curse
- 1991 version (White Label/Mushroom)

The Fireman's Curse is the second studio album by Australian rock band Hunters & Collectors, released on 5 September 1983. It was co-produced by Konrad Plank and the band in Neunkirchen, Germany. The album peaked at No. 77 on the Australian Kent Music Report Albums Chart and No. 46 on the New Zealand Albums Chart. The lead single, "Judas Sheep", was released in August that year but failed to reach the Top 50 on the Australian singles chart, however it appeared in the top 40 in New Zealand.

It was the final album to feature percussionist Greg Perano, and the only album to feature guitarist Martin Lubran.

== Background ==
The Fireman's Curse was prepared in June and July 1983. While in the UK and attempting to enter the local market, the group's members "were doing odd jobs, illegally, to keep afloat and getting steadily more miserable in the process". They decamped from United Kingdom, where they had been based while touring Europe for six months, to Neunkirchen, West Germany. They co-produced the album with Konrad 'Conny' Plank (also known for his work with Can, Cluster, Kraftwerk), at Conny's Studio, with Dave Hutchins engineering. It was released by White Label/Mushroom Records and Virgin Records on 5 September 1983. Mark Seymour later said:

[Virgin] picked us up because of our commercial potential, because of our image. They saw us as having a groovy tribal funk post-nuclear Mad Max image. In actual reality ... we looked like a football team, like Australian boys. When they heard The Fireman's Curse (the second album), they dropped us because they didn't think it was commercial.

— Mark Seymour (27 April 1986), The Canberra Times

In his autobiography, Thirteen Tonne Theory: Life Inside Hunters and Collectors (2008), Seymour elaborated on this story, suggesting the group's three-record deal with Virgin ended when he and fellow band members insulted the label's executive, Simon Draper, by telling him that he was "a poncy little blueblood" with no faith in them. Seymour additionally describes the album as "an unmitigated disaster; an awful collection of tuneless songs full of twisted invective (mine, mostly) and apocalyptic moaning... The whole exercise was excruciatingly juvenile and a tragic waste of what could easily have been an international breakthrough record."

The album did not reach the top 50 in Australia, peaking at No. 77 on the Australian Kent Music Report Albums Chart but it did reach No. 46 on the New Zealand Albums Chart. Its lead single, "Judas Sheep", released in August, reached No. 35 in New Zealand but did not chart in Australia. They had supported their releases with an eight-week tour of Australia during August and September. After the second single, "Sway", released in November, failed to chart in both markets, the group briefly disbanded.

In July 1991 the album was re-issued on CD by Mushroom Records and was subsequently re-mastered and re-issued by Liberation Music on 11 August 2003.

== Reception ==
Professional ratings
Review scores
Source	Rating
AllMusic	2/5 stars

Mark Dodshon, writing in The Sydney Morning Herald on the album's release predicted that it was "a likely winner" with their new material showing "there are no radical departures in musical style". Australian musicologist, Ian McFarlane, writing with the benefit of hindsight, claims The Fireman's Curse was "overly ambitious and cluttered, and generally suffered from a lack of fresh ideas".

== Track listing ==
All tracks are written by John Archer, Geoff Crosby, Doug Falconer, Martin Lubran, Greg Perano, Robert Miles, Mark Seymour, Michael Waters.

No.	Title	Length
1.	"Prologue"	0:32
2.	"Curse"	5:45
3.	"Fish Roar"	3:17
4.	"Blind Snake Sundae"	6:10
5.	"Mr. Right"	3:37
6.	"Sway"	5:54
7.	"Judas Sheep"	4:04
8.	"Eggheart"	5:01
9.	"Drinking Bomb"	4:49
10.	"Epilogue"	0:55

== Personnel ==
Credited to:

Hunters & Collectors members

- John Archer – electric bass
- Geoff Crosby – keyboards
- Doug Falconer – drums
- Martin Lubran – guitar
- Robert Miles – live sound, art director
- Greg Perano – percussion
- Mark Seymour – guitar, lead vocals

Horns of Contempt members

- Jack Howard – trumpet
- Jeremy Smith – French horn
- Michael Waters – trombone

Production details

Producer – Konrad Plank, Hunters & Collectors

== Charts ==
Chart (1983)	Peak position
Australia (Kent Music Report)	77
New Zealand Albums Chart	46
