= Juice (Australian magazine) =

Defunct Australian music magazine

- Editor: John O'Donnell, Craig Mathieson, Lisa Anthony, Ben McKelvey
- Categories: Music
- Frequency: Monthly (13 issues per year including yearbook)
- Circulation: 6,000 (at closure)
- Publisher: Terraplane Press (1993-2002); Pacific Publications (2003)
- Founder: Toby Creswell, Lesa-Belle Furhagen
- Founded: 1993
- First issue: March 1993
- Final issue Number: July 2003; 123
- Country: Australia
- Based in: Darlinghurst, Sydney
- Language: English

Juice was an Australian music magazine which was published between 1993 and 2003.

== History ==
Juice was launched by Toby Creswell and Lesa-Belle Furhagen, who had previously worked at Rolling Stone Australia. The two magazines would become rivals in the youth market, as they covered similar topics and music.

The first issue of Juice was published March 1993, with 13 issues published each year. The magazine was monthly, the thirteenth issue being a yearbook. It occasionally reproduced content from American magazine Spin. The magazine featured musicians on its cover, and one featuring a near-nude Angie Hart became infamous as the singer sought to change how she was perceived at the time.

John O'Donnell was founding editor, leaving in 1994 for Sony Music Australia's alternative record label Murmur. His final issue was June 1994. Craig Mathieson took over as editor and was later replaced by Lisa Anthony, and Ben McKelvey. Toby Creswell remained editorial director until 2002.

The magazine won several awards, including Magazine of the Year, Magazine of General Excellence, and Best Feature Story for a Magazine at the 1998 Australian Society of Magazine Editors awards. At the time it was considered Australia's "leading music-lifestyle title".

In 1999 Juice launched their website juice.net, which was updated daily with music news, videos, and reviews, aimed at 15-25 year olds. The website received 60,000 visitors on its first day, and Lesa-Belle Furhagen announced they would offer a free email service, message boards, and chat channels. It was expected to earn money through advertising and ecommerce.

Juice was published in the Sydney suburb Darlinghurst by Terraplane Press until it was sold to Pacific Publications at the beginning of 2003. After being relaunched in March, on 10 July 2003 Juice was closed, with its publisher citing low circulation numbers which had dropped from 25,000 to 6,000. Juice published its final issue in July 2003, number 123.

== Collections ==
The Arts Centre Melbourne, National Library of Australia, State Library of New South Wales and State Library Victoria hold complete sets of Juice.
