= 100 Best Australian Albums =

2010 book by John O'Donnell

- Cover
- Author: John O'Donnell, Toby Creswell, Craig Mathieson
- Language: English
- Subject: Australian music, rock, pop, discography
- Publisher: Hardie Grant Books
- Publication date: 25 October 2010
- Publication place: Australia
- Media type: print (hardback)
- Pages: 256
- ISBN: 978-1-74066-955-9
- OCLC: 646229830

The 100 Best Australian Albums (a.k.a. One Hundred Best Australian Albums) is a compendium of rock and pop albums of the past 50 years as compiled by music journalists Toby Creswell, Craig Mathieson and John O'Donnell. The book was published on 25 October 2010 by Hardie Grant Books (Prahran, Victoria). Sony Music has released a five CD compilation to support the book.

According to O'Donnell, "It wouldn't be a good list if it didn't polarise people and we hope that this list will. We also hope that it will get people sitting around comparing their favourites and discovering or re-discovering these great albums and others." The compendium was updated in November 2017 with ten additional entries, The 110 Best Australian Albums.

== Background ==
=== About the authors ===
Creswell wrote his first article on rock & roll for Nation Review in 1972. He subsequently wrote articles about all aspects of popular culture and music for RAM (Rock Australia Magazine), Billboard, Roadrunner and other national and international magazines and newspapers. He has worked for MTV and a variety of television programs as a writer and presenter. In 1985 he became editor of the Australian edition of Rolling Stone and two years later was in a partnership which took over the franchise. He continued to edit Rolling Stone until September 1992. He was a founding editor of Juice Magazine.

Mathieson is also a journalist, known for his work with Rolling Stone, Juice Magazine, The Age and The Sydney Morning Herald, as well as for his book Hi Fi Days (1996), a biography of three leading Australian bands, Silverchair, Spiderbait and You Am I.

O'Donnell started out as a freelance writer, worked as Music Editor at Rolling Stone, before leaving to co-found and edit Juice Magazine. In 1994, O'Donnell created the Murmur label for Sony Music Australia and went on to sign successful artists, including Silverchair, Ammonia, Jebediah, and Something for Kate. He later worked for Sony at the corporate level before leaving for EMI Australia in 2002. O'Donnell was the CEO of EMI in the Oceania region from 2002 until September 2008. O'Donnell is also active in a number of industry bodies such as ARIA and PPCA.

=== Writing process ===
In July 2009, O'Donnell and some of his friends discussed their selections for the best Australian albums. He decided a book on the topic was required and contacted fellow journalists, Creswell and Mathieson, to pitch the idea to publishers with Hardie Grant being chosen. Over the latter part of 2009, the trio revisited numerous albums, O'Donnell estimates he listened to 450–500. After four months of trimming their lists, the authors divided up the descriptions of each entry according to personal experiences with Mathieson focusing on post-1980s, Creswell on 1960s and 1970s, and O'Donnell providing the overview.

== See also ==
- Music of Australia § Popular music
- Australian rock
