= Hunters & Collectors =

Australian rock band

- Origin: Melbourne, Victoria, Australia
- Genres: Rock, pub rock, post-punk, art-funk
- Years active: 1981–1998, 2009, 2013–present
- Labels: White/Mushroom, Festival, I.R.S., Liberation, Sony, Virgin, A&M, Epic
- Members: John Archer; Doug Falconer; Mark Seymour; Jack Howard; Jeremy Smith; Michael Waters; Barry Palmer; Robert Miles
- Past members: Geoff Crosby; Greg Perano; Ray Tosti-Gueira; Nigel Crocker; Andy Lynn; Chris Malherbe; Martin Lubran

Hunters & Collectors are an Australian rock band from Melbourne, formed in 1981. Fronted by founding member, singer-songwriter and guitarist Mark Seymour, the band's other mainstays are John Archer on bass guitar and Doug Falconer on drums and percussion. Soon after forming they were joined by Jack Howard on trumpet and keyboards, Jeremy Smith on French horn, guitars and keyboards, and Michael Waters on trombone and keyboards. Also acknowledged as a founder was audio engineer and art designer Robert Miles. Joining in 1988, Barry Palmer, on lead guitar, remained until they disbanded in 1998. The group reformed in 2013 with the 1998 line-up.

Originally influenced by krautrock and the productions of Conny Plank, Hunters & Collectors' early music featured abrasive percussion, noisy guitar, and driving bass lines, producing a tribal post-punk sound exemplified by their debut single, "Talking to a Stranger" (1982). The band recruited Plank to produce two of their early albums, The Fireman's Curse (1983) and The Jaws of Life (1984), though neither charted in the Top 50 of the Australian Kent Music Report Albums Chart.

A turning point came with Human Frailty (1986), their first Top 10 album, which marked a shift toward a more polished, anthemic pub rock sound. This evolution continued with later charting releases, including Ghost Nation (1989), Cut (1992), and Demon Flower (1994).

Among their best-charting singles were "Throw Your Arms Around Me" (1984), "Say Goodbye" (1986), "When the River Runs Dry" (1989), "True Tears of Joy" (1992), and "Holy Grail" (1993).

They became one of the most popular live acts in Australia. Musicologist Ian McFarlane noted that their "great achievement was to lay bare human emotions in the intensely ritualistic milieu of the pub-rock gig".

== History ==
=== 1978–1980: Formation ===
Hunters & Collectors' founding mainstays are John Archer (bass guitar), Doug Falconer (drums) and Mark Seymour (guitar and lead vocals). They met as residential students of Ormond College at the University of Melbourne in the late 1970s. Seymour is the older brother of Nick Seymour, the bass guitarist for Crowded House. In 1978 with Robert Miles (sound engineer) Archer, Falconer and Seymour formed a casual band, The Schnorts (named after a Belgian tennis racket).

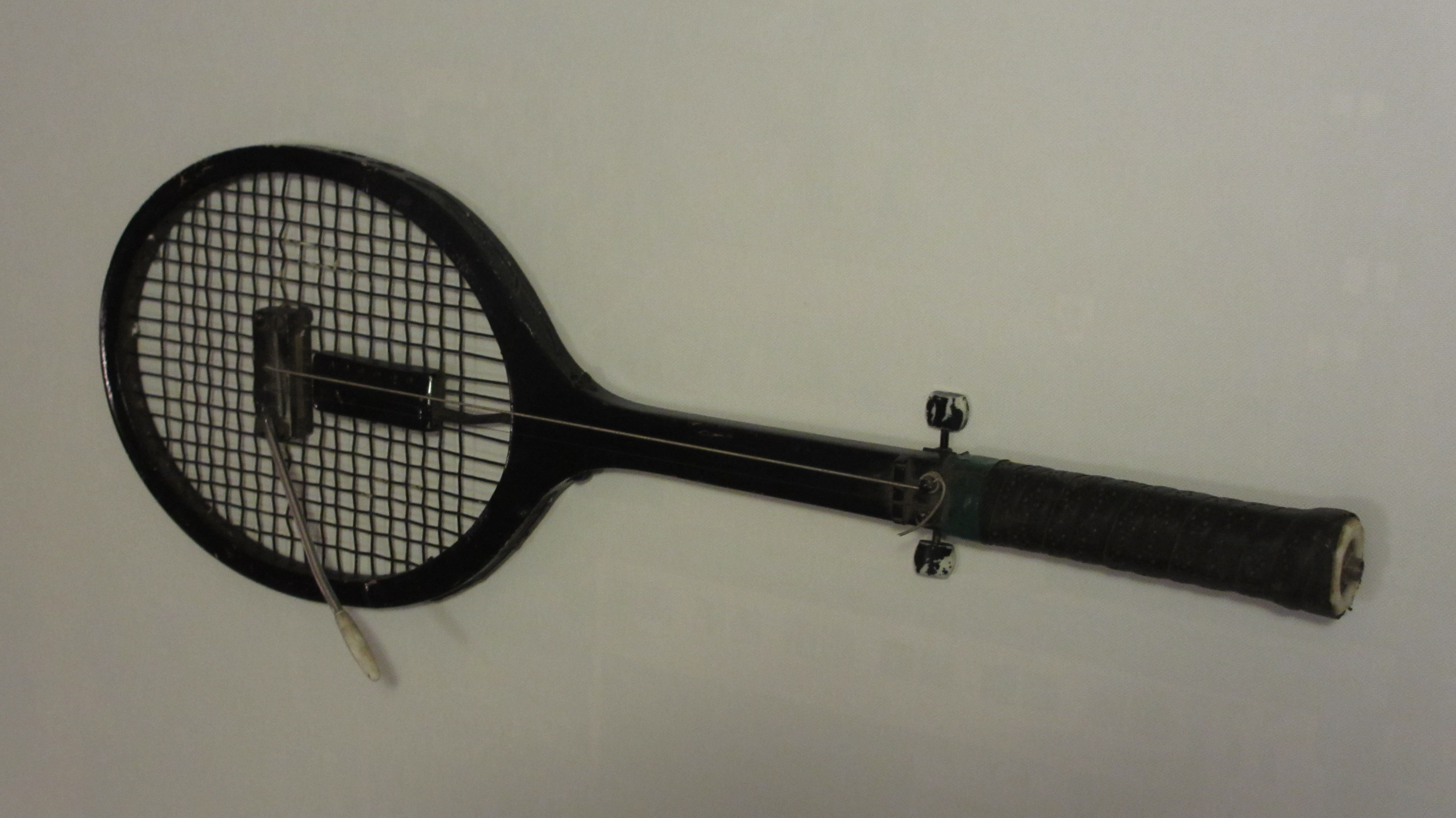
The electric tennis racquet used by The Schnorts.

They played cover versions of 1960s songs, including "To Sir, with Love". Their lead singer, Margot O'Neill, was a journalist on radio 3RRR program, Talking Headlines.

A more ambitious band, The Jetsonnes, followed in September 1979, with the addition of Ray Tosti-Gueira on guitar and backing vocals. According to music journalist, Clinton Walker, The Jetsonnes had a "clever post-punk pop sound" which "was lighter, bouncier (rather than funkier) and more infectious than other like-minded bands". Their only released track is "Newspaper" which was one side of a gig give away split single in June 1980 with "Miniskirts in Moscow" by fellow pop group, International Exiles, as the other. By September that year The Jetsonnes had disbanded but Archer, Falconer, Miles, Seymour and Tosti-Gueira decided to continue with new members, Geoff Crosby on keyboards and Greg Perano (ex-True Wheels) on percussion to form a new band.

=== 1981–1983: World of Stone to The Fireman's Curse ===
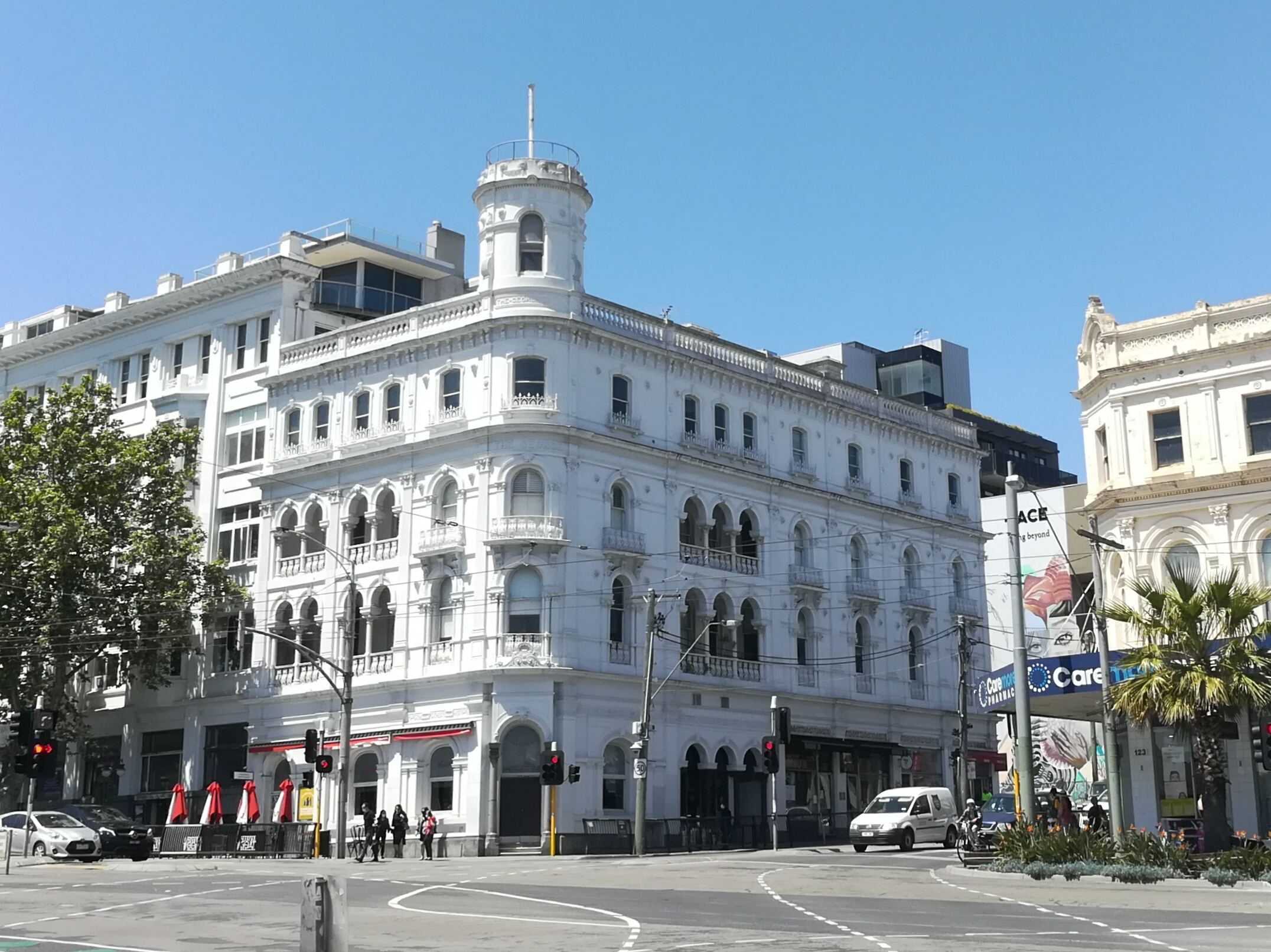
The Crystal Ballroom in St Kilda, where Hunters & Collectors made their debut live performance in May 1981

Hunters & Collectors formed in Melbourne in early 1981 with the initial line-up of Archer, Crosby, Falconer, Miles, Perano, Seymour and Tosti-Gueira. Miles was credited as an equal part of the band's output and stayed throughout their main career. Perano provided the band's name from "Hunters and Collectors", a track on 1975's Landed album by German group Can. Australian musicologist, Ian McFarlane, compared the new band with The Jetsonnes and found it to be "a far more radical and unremitting concept". Hunters & Collectors played live for the first time on 15 May 1981 at the Crystal Ballroom in St Kilda, as part of a medical fundraiser for American musician Snakefinger.

Originally Hunters & Collectors were influenced by the Krautrock genre and the productions of Conny Plank, featuring strong percussive influences, noisy guitar, and driving bass lines. As lead singer and guitarist, Seymour became the principal lyricist and the linchpin of the group. The core of Hunters & Collectors was expanded by a horn section, later dubbed Horns of Contempt, consisting of Nigel Crocker and Michael Waters both on trombone; Jack Howard, Andy Lynn and Chris Malherbe each on trumpet; and Jeremy Smith on French horn.

Mushroom Records specifically formed a new alternative label, White Label Records, when they signed Hunters & Collectors. Their first release was World of Stone, a three-track 12" extended play in January 1982. It reached the top 50 on the Australian Kent Music Report Singles Chart. Their debut self-titled album followed in July and was produced by the band and engineered by Sydney-based Tony Cohen. It peaked at No. 21 on the Australian Kent Music Report Albums Chart, and No. 14 on the New Zealand Albums Chart. The album's lead single, "Talking to a Stranger", also released in July, was accompanied by a music video directed by film maker Richard Lowenstein, but it did not enter the Top 50. By that time, Tosti-Gueira was replaced by Martin Lubran (ex-Spiny Norman) on guitar and the Horns of Contempt were reduced to three: Howard, Smith and Waters.

Another EP, Payload, was released in November, its four tracks were co-produced by Mike Howlett (ex-Gong) and the band. The EP peaked at No. 31 on the New Zealand Singles Chart. Lowenstein also directed the music video for the lead single, "Lumps of Lead", but it did not chart in Australia or New Zealand. In 1983 the band toured the United Kingdom for six months and signed with Virgin Records. The label recompiled three tracks from the Australian version of Hunters & Collectors and all four tracks from Payload into the international version of Hunters & Collectors, which was released in April. While in the UK and attempting to enter the local market, the group's members "were doing odd jobs, illegally, to keep afloat and getting steadily more miserable in the process".

By mid-year the band had decamped to Conny's Studio in Germany, where they recorded their second album, The Fireman's Curse, co-produced by Plank (Can, Cluster, Kraftwerk), with Dave Hutchins engineering, and released by White Label and Virgin Records on 5 September 1983. McFarlane felt it was "overly ambitious and cluttered, and generally suffered from a lack of fresh ideas". The album did not reach the top 50 in Australia but did so in New Zealand. A three-record deal with Virgin was broken when band members insulted the label's executive, Simon Draper, by telling him that he was "a poncy little blueblood" with no faith in them. Its lead single, "Judas Sheep" (August), reached the top 40 in New Zealand but did not chart in Australia. After November's single, "Sway", failed to chart in both markets, they disbanded briefly.

=== 1984–1986: The Jaws of Life to Human Frailty ===
Late in 1983, Hunters & Collectors had briefly disbanded, but soon reformed without Lubran and Perano. Seymour explained to The Canberra Times' Neil Lade why the group had reconvened "[we] have something valuable to offer the Australian music scene". The 1984 line-up now featured greater use of keyboards by Crosby, as well as more emphasis on work by Howard, Smith and Waters. The band began to pare back the art rock elements of their earliest albums, although they retained a muscular, bass-driven sound, rounded off by the band's distinctive horn section. Seymour's lyrics became less abstruse and focused on the twin themes of the fraught personal relationships and the politics of the day.

The first album featuring the new line up was The Jaws of Life which appeared on 6 August 1984. McFarlane described it as having "a stripped-down rock sound, a driving rhythm, more concise arrangements and stronger songs". While Toby Creswell writing for Rolling Stone felt its "aesthetic push ranged from the barrenness and isolation of outback Australia to the beer-swilling machismo of the suburbs". The album reached the top 100 in Australia and top 40 in New Zealand. Again co-produced with Plank, it was recorded at the old Can studio by René Tinner. The title, cover art and opening track, "42 Wheels", all refer to the murder of five people by an intoxicated, outback trucker, Douglas Crabbe.

The Jaws of Life provided a single, "The Slab" (also in August), which did not chart. However relentless touring, airplay on radio station Triple J plus their music videos screening on Countdown and other music video shows, fostered a devoted following on the pub rock scene. In November they issued the first version of "Throw Your Arms Around Me" as a single-only, it had no chart success in Australia but reached No. 28 in New Zealand in the following March.

On 24 and 25 August 1984 Hunters & Collectors performed two gigs at The Venue in Melbourne, the performances were recorded and filmed. For the gigs Smith and Waters also played organs. The band issued their first live album, The Way to Go Out, on 1 April 1985, which was recorded and mixed live by Miles. A month later the group released their first video album, on VHS, of the same name, which also included three previously aired music videos, "Talking to a Stranger", "Lumps of Lead", and "Judas Sheep". The live album reached the top 100 in Australia and No. 21 in New Zealand. It "captured all the ferocious power and muscular energy that characterised the band's pub gigs" according to McFarlane. A live version of "Throw Your Arms Around Me" also appeared on the album and VHS. Crosby left after The Way to Go Out was released and Waters took over on keyboards.

Greater Australian commercial success came in April 1986, with their fourth studio album, Human Frailty, which McFarlane found was "a further refinement of the sinewy and dynamic approach established" previously. It was co-produced by the group with Gavin MacKillop. Australian music journalist, Ed Nimmervoll, noted "Seymour's themes of alienation and sexual politics came to the fore" with the album. It became their first Australian Top Ten album and reached No. 5 in New Zealand. In 2008 Human Frailty, was featured by SBS TV on the Great Australian Albums second series. Creswell presented the series and noted that "the album documents, in the most candid terms, the course of a doomed love affair that [Seymour] was then going through. A parallel narrative is also running through the album, which is of a group adjusting to life on the road and an exploration of what it means to be Australian in the 1980s".

"Say Goodbye", the lead single, was issued ahead of the album in February and peaked at No. 24 in Australia and No. 20 in New Zealand. The single's back cover art includes their logo, a H & C symbol, where the "&" is stylised with twin snakes entwined around a hunting knife, a variation of a caduceus. Nimmervoll described how the group "had discovered how to tap the unique vein they had unearthed; where, in a sweat-dripping venue packed to the rafters with a beer swilling macho rock fans the audience would and could at the top of their voices unselfconsciously sing along to a chorus like 'you don't make me feel like a woman any more'". The chorus appears in "Say Goodbye" and Pollyanna Sutton of The Canberra Times felt that Seymour had written "a line which he could sing in a pub with a lot of vulgarity that would get both guys and girls singing".

A third version of "Throw Your Arms Around Me" was recorded for the album and was issued as its second single, which peaked at No. 49 in Australia in May 1986. Eventually it became one of their most popular songs, voted in the Top 5 on the Triple J Hottest 100 for 1989, 1990, and 1991. Two further singles from Human Frailty were released, "Everything's on Fire" (August 1986) and "Is There Anybody in There?" (October), both reached the top 50 in New Zealand but not in Australia. The band had signed a parallel deal with I.R.S. Records for North America, which released the album there in July 1987.

=== 1987–1991: Living Daylight to Collected Works ===
After Human Frailty appeared in Australia Hunters & Collectors toured the US twice and then released their third EP, Living Daylight. It was co-produced with Greg Edward and released in Australia in April 1987. McFarlane felt it was "something of a stop-gap measure". The three-track EP appeared on the Australian Top 50 Singles Chart and reached No. 25 in New Zealand. It was followed by their fifth studio album, What's a Few Men?, also co-produced with Edward and released in November. It peaked at No. 16 in Australia and No. 9 in New Zealand.

The album provided the singles "Do You See What I See" (October) and "Still Hangin' Round" (February 1988). "Do You See What I See" reached the top 40 in Australia and in New Zealand it became their highest charting single at No. 13. "Still Hangin' Round" was deemed to be too "Australian": it was cut from the US configuration of the album, which was retitled Fate, and released in September 1988. Three new tracks were recorded for the US CD version, including "Back on the Breadline", which was issued as a single and charted at No. 6 on the Billboard Modern Rock Tracks. In August 2003 a re-issue of What's a Few Men? by the Liberation Blue label featured all 15 tracks from the two versions.

Early in 1988 Barry Palmer (also a member of Harem Scarem, ex-Stephen Cummings Band) joined the group on guitar. Ghost Nation, co-produced with Clive Martin and released in November 1989, was their second Australian Top Ten, it appeared on the ARIA Albums Chart. In New Zealand it reached the top 30 and also charted in Sweden reaching No. 31 on the Sverigetopplistan. McFarlane enthused "[it] was perhaps the band's finest album to date". However Allmusic's Mike DeGagne declared that it was "one of this Australian band's weakest attempts, [it] suffers greatly from bland lyrics and gray instrumental work through the entirety of the album". It provided four singles, beginning with "When the River Runs Dry", appearing in September and peaking at No. 23 in Australia in December and No. 5 on Billboard Modern Rock Tracks in 1990.

Hunters & Collectors supported Midnight Oil's North American tour of 1990 and, although the band struggled to find further chart success in the US, they maintained their status in Australia and New Zealand as local favourites. During that year Rolling Stone (Australia) named them Australian Band of the Year. Contemporary singer-songwriter, Paul Kelly, recalled that by the late 1980s the band "were peaking in the pubs, gathering an army ... [the group] had a big, fat industrial bass sound, an anthemic horn section, and their singlet-clad singer [Seymour], as fit as a trout, held nothing back".

At the ARIA Music Awards of 1990 the group were nominated in six categories and Ghost Nation won Best Cover Art for Miles' work. A compilation album, Collected Works, was released on 19 November 1990, and was another Top Ten album in Australia. It contained a fourth version of "Throw Your Arms Around Me" which was released as a single for a third time by December that year. It peaked at No. 34 in Australia – the highest position of all three versions. Another single, "Where Do You Go", which was co-produced by Nick Sansano and issued in late 1991, also reached the Top 40.

=== 1992–1998: Cut to Under One Roof ===
On 6 October 1992 Hunters & Collectors released their seventh studio album, Cut, co-produced by Don Gehman (Jimmy Barnes), Sansano and the band. Although relationships were strained due to Gehman's aggressive working methods, the band almost broke up during recording sessions, Cut peaked at No. 6 in Australia and No. 17 in New Zealand. It retained a balance between the band's artistic core and its commercial ambitions.

The album provided six singles, all charted on the ARIA Singles Chart Top 100. The fourth one, "True Tears of Joy" from January 1993, peaked at No. 14 in Australia to become their highest charting single. It was followed by the anthemic single, "Holy Grail". Seymour wrote the track, with Smith, after he had read a novel by Jeanette Winterson, The Passion (1987), detailing Napoleon's march to Russia in 1812. Seymour's lyrics also reflect the band's own flagging attempts to "crack" the American market and their recent "internal tension" while recording Cut. "I wanted to write a song to serve up this idea that regardless of what happens you've got to stay true to the quest". The song is often heard in context with the Australian Football League (AFL), and was Channel 10's theme song for their AFL TV coverage from 2002 to 2006, it was sung by Seymour at the 2002 AFL Grand Final, although he doesn't follow the game.

Demon Flower, their eighth studio album, followed on 16 May 1994, which was co-produced with Nick Mainsbridge (The Triffids, Martha's Vineyard, Ratcat). McFarlane noticed that it "featured a stronger emphasis on guitars". It peaked at No. 2 in Australia – their highest charting album – and No. 9 in New Zealand. Demon Flower provided "Easy", which reached the top 40 in both countries, and three other singles, which did not chart. Demon Flower was dominated by themes relating to the politics in the state of Victoria, particularly the economic rationalist policies of Premier Jeff Kennett.

A double live album, Living ... In Large Rooms and Lounges, was released in November 1995, with one disc consisting of an acoustic set at the now-defunct Continental Cafe in Prahran, and the other was a typical pub performance. Juggernaut, their ninth studio album, was co-produced with Kalju Tonuma (The Mavis's, Boom Crash Opera) and Mark Opitz (Hoodoo Gurus, Jimmy Barnes, INXS). The album was recorded in 1997 and released in January 1998, and featured the single "True Believers". With its release, Hunters & Collectors announced that they would disband after the Juggernaut Say Goodbye tour.

Hunters & Collectors embarked on their final tour of Australia in 1998, with a concert performed at Selina's, Coogee Bay Hotel, Sydney being recorded and released on CD and DVD as Under One Roof. The group's last public show was on 22 March 1998 in Melbourne. According to rock historian, Ian McFarlane, their "great achievement was to lay bare human emotions in the intensely ritualistic milieu of the pub-rock gig".

In March 2009 Seymour told Patrick Donovan of The Age "It was a pretty serious decision to retire, and all the guys in the band are heavyweight professionals in their respective areas of employment. Obviously we have to put ourselves first. There's just no momentum in the idea (of reforming)".

=== 1999–current: Post-breakup ===
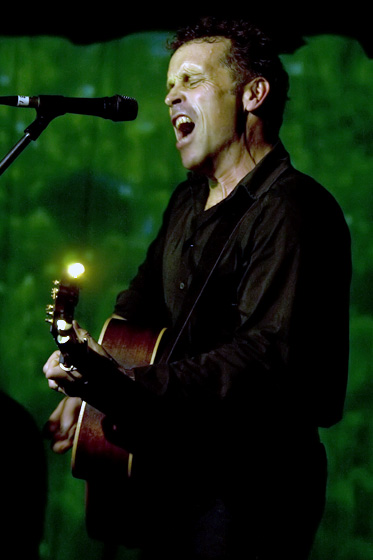
Seymour performing in 2008

After leaving Hunters & Collectors Tosti-Gueira was in Soldiers of Fortune. Lubran has worked for numerous artists including Permanent Press, The Dying People, Apocalypse, Connection, Great Temptation, Red=Yellow=Blue, The Index, The Possum Hunters, The Slaughtermen (1989), Mercy Mercy, Dave Graney and The White Buffalos (1989–90), The Trailblazers, Truckasaurus (1993), and George Huxley's International Velvet. Perano has been a member of Pierre's World, Swell Maps, Big Choir, Love Rodeo (1984–85), The Deadly Hume (1985–88), Funkicide, and Kylie Minogue Band (1990).

Back in August 1995, while still a member of Hunters & Collectors, Palmer formed a side project, Deadstar, with Peter Jones (of Crowded House) on drums and percussion; and Caroline Kennedy on lead vocals and guitar. In 1996 Seymour undertook a solo tour and, with Palmer producing, he started recording his debut solo album, King Without a Clue, which was issued in October 1997. Deadstar members Palmer, Jones, and Kennedy had been joined by Seymour's brother, Nick in November 1996; all were used on Seymour's album. Subsequent to Hunters & Collector's disbandment in 1998, Seymour and Howard have each pursued solo musical careers. After Deadstar disbanded in 2001 Palmer became a producer-songwriter and was the subject of a 2005 reality TV series, The Hit Game.

"Throw Your Arms Around Me" has been covered by many artists including Crowded House, Pearl Jam, Luka Bloom, and the Doug Anthony All Stars (and subsequently by member Paul McDermott). In May 2001 it was recognised by the Australasian Performing Right Association (APRA) as one of the Top 30 Australian songs of all time. In 2009 the track was listed at No. 23 in Triple J's Hottest 100 of All Time.

On 14 July 2005 Hunters & Collectors were inducted into the ARIA Hall of Fame at the Plaza Ballroom alongside Split Enz, Renée Geyer, Normie Rowe, Smoky Dawson, and The Easybeats. They were inducted into the Hall of Fame by Peter Garrett, former lead singer of tour mates, Midnight Oil, At the ceremony Hunters & Collectors provided a one-off performance of "Say Goodbye" and "Throw Your Arms Around Me".

The boys and myself are excited to be honoured in this way by the Australian music industry. This is a unique gesture of recognition for the work that Hunters and Collectors did, and it will be a rare opportunity for the band to be re-united under very auspicious circumstances.

— Mark Seymour, July 2005

In 2008 Seymour published his memoirs, Thirteen Tonne Theory: Life Inside Hunters and Collectors, detailing his experiences with the group. He described the difficulty in writing tracks for the band with all members involved, "the thing that ultimately made things more difficult was the sheer size of the band".

In his autobiography Small Moments of Glory (Brolga Publishing, 2020), Jack Howard wrote, "In 2008, a special and wonderfully-packaged box set, in the form of a cabinet of architectural drawers, of all our recordings had been released". Titled Horn of Plenty (Liberation Records), the box set included 14 CDs and 2 DVDs; Noel Mengel of The News described it as the "best box set" of the year.

Hunters & Collectors played at the Melbourne Cricket Ground on 14 March 2009 for Sound Relief, which was a multi-venue rock music concert in support of victims of the Victorian Bushfire Crisis. The event was held simultaneously with a concert at the Sydney Cricket Ground. All the proceeds from the Melbourne Concert went to the Red Cross Victorian Bushfire relief. Appearing with Hunters & Collectors in Melbourne were, Augie March, Bliss N Eso with Paris Wells, Gabriella Cilmi, Kasey Chambers & Shane Nicholson with Troy Cassar-Daley, Jack Johnson, Jet, Kings of Leon, Liam Finn (joined on stage with Crowded House), Midnight Oil, Paul Kelly, Split Enz and Wolfmother.

Seymour expressed the group's motivation "This event is not about Hunters & Collectors ... It's about contributing to the groundswell of generosity that has emerged in the community after the cataclysm that's been inflicted on people simply because of where they live. It's a very big Australian story and it's got a cultural dimension. It's a huge honour to be part of it". Hunters & Collectors performed a selection of their most popular songs over a 40-minute set, including an encore performance of "The Slab". The Sound Relief concert, including the Hunters & Collectors set, was broadcast on Australian cable TV and FM radio, which was released on DVD.

A tribute album, Crucible – The Songs of Hunters & Collectors, was released in September 2013, including contributions by Birds of Tokyo, Eddie Vedder and Neil Finn (of Crowded House), Cloud Control, Something for Kate, and The Rubens, as well as a remix of the original "Talking to a Stranger" by The Avalanches.

The band reunited in their 1998 line-up of Archer, Falconer, Howard, Palmer, Seymour, Smith and Waters, at the 2013 AFL Grand Final playing "Do You See What I See" and "The Holy Grail". They headlined a series of A Day on the Green outdoor concerts in early 2014, and supported Bruce Springsteen and the E Street Band during their tour of Australia on 15 and 16 February 2014 at Melbourne Rectangular Stadium. Paul Busch of ToneDeaf website caught their gig on 4 April at the Enmore Theatre in Sydney: "Seymour was in fine vocal form and the sound, although a bit too loud to start with, settled down ... The joy could also be seen in the energy of the band". On 12 April 2014 they performed their last concert for the reunion series at the Palais Theatre in St. Kilda. The band subsequently won the 2014 Helpmann Award for Best Australian Contemporary Concert.

In November 2017, Cut, the band's 7th album was given a 25th anniversary release with a bonus disc of "offcuts", "precuts" and "postcuts".

The band was scheduled to reunite again to headline the Red Hot Summer Tour across Australia in early 2020, accompanied by James Reyne, The Living End, The Angels, Baby Animals, Killing Heidi and Boom Crash Opera. But the tour was eventually cancelled in the wake of COVID-19 and the subsequent pandemic.

== Awards and nominations ==
=== ARIA Music Awards ===
The ARIA Music Awards is an annual awards ceremony that recognises excellence, innovation, and achievement across all genres of Australian music. They commenced in 1987. Hunters & Collectors were inducted into the Hall of Fame in 2005.

Year	Nominee / work	Award	Result
1987	Human Frailty	Album of the Year	Nominated
1987	Human Frailty	Best Group	Nominated
1987	"Say Goodbye"	Single of the Year	Nominated
1987	"Everything's on Fire" (Tony Leitch and Andrew de Groot)	Best Video	Nominated
1988	themselves	Best Group	Nominated
1990	Ghost Nation	Album of the Year	Nominated
1990	Ghost Nation	Best Group	Nominated
1990	Ghost Nation	Best Cover Art	Won
1990	"When The River Runs Dry"	Single of the Year	Nominated
1990	"When The River Runs Dry"	Song of the Year	Nominated
1990	"When The River Runs Dry"	Best Video	Nominated
1990	Clive Martin & Hunters & Collectors for Ghost Nation	Producer of the Year	Nominated
1991	"Throw Your Arms Around Me"	Best Group	Nominated
1991	"Throw Your Arms Around Me"	Single of the Year	Nominated
1991	"Turn a Blind Eye"	Song of the Year	Nominated
1991	Collected Works	Best Cover Art	Nominated
1992	"Where Do You Go?"	Best Group	Nominated
1993	Cut	Album of the Year	Nominated
2005	themselves	ARIA Hall of Fame	Inductee

=== Countdown Australian Music Awards ===
Countdown was an Australian pop music TV series on national broadcaster ABC-TV from 1974 to 1987, it presented music awards from 1979 to 1987, initially in conjunction with magazine TV Week. The TV Week / Countdown Awards were a combination of popular-voted and peer-voted awards.

Year	Nominee / work	Award	Result
1982	Hunters & Collectors	Best Debut Album	Nominated
1982	"Talking to a Stranger"	Best Debut Single	Nominated
1986	Human Frailty	Best Album	Nominated

=== Helpmann Awards ===
The Helpmann Awards is an awards show, celebrating live entertainment and performing arts in Australia, presented by industry group Live Performance Australia since 2001. Note: 2020 and 2021 were cancelled due to the COVID-19 pandemic.

Year	Nominee / work	Award	Result	Ref.
2014	Hunters & Collectors	Best Australian Contemporary Concert	Won	

== Personnel ==
Listed chronologically:

Current members

- Mark Seymour – lead vocals, guitar (1981–1998, 2009, 2013–present)
- Jack Howard – trumpet, keyboards, backing vocals (1981–1998, 2009, 2013–present)
- Michael Waters – trombone, keyboards (1981–1998, 2009, 2013–present)
- Jeremy Smith – French horn, guitars, keyboards, programming, backing vocals (1981–1998, 2009, 2013–present)
- Doug Falconer – drums, percussion, programming, backing vocals (1981–1998, 2009, 2013–present)
- John Archer – bass, backing vocals (1981–1998, 2009, 2013–present)
- Barry Palmer – guitar (1988–1998, 2009, 2013–present)

Additional personnel

- Robert Miles – live mixing, engineering, art direction, graphic design (1981–1998, 2009, 2013–present)

Former members

- Nigel Crocker – trombone (1981–82)
- Geoff Crosby – keyboards (1981–1985)
- Andy Lynn – trumpet (1981–1982)
- Chris Malherbe – trumpet (1981–1982)
- Greg Perano – percussion (1981–1983)
- Ray Tosti-Gueira – guitar, backing vocals (1981–1982)
- Martin Lubran – guitar (1982–1983)

== Discography ==
- Hunters & Collectors (1982)
- The Fireman's Curse (1983)
- The Jaws of Life (1984)
- Human Frailty (1986)
- What's a Few Men? (1987)
- Ghost Nation (1989)
- Cut (1992)
- Demon Flower (1994)
- Juggernaut (1998)
