= John O'Donnell (music journalist) =

Australian music journalist and record producer

John O'Donnell (born 1962) is a long-standing member of the Australian music industry. Starting as a freelance writer, he eventually became the music editor of Rolling Stone Australia before leaving to co-found and edit Juice Magazine.

In 1994 O'Donnell created the Murmur label for Sony Music Australia and went on to sign bands including Silverchair, Ammonia, Jebediah and Something for Kate. He later worked for Sony at the corporate level before leaving for EMI Music Australia in 2002. Ultimately O'Donnell was the CEO of EMI in the Oceania region from 2002 until September 2008. Because O'Donnell's departure from EMI was quickly followed by the departure of many of its biggest selling artists (Missy Higgins, Silverchair), the situation was interpreted by some in the media as symptomatic of the difficult takeover of EMI by Terra Firma.

O'Donnell is also active in a number of industry bodies such as ARIA and PPCA.

== Management ==
In November 2009, O'Donnell and John Watson announced that they were jointly assuming the management of one of Australia's longest running and most successful rock bands, Cold Chisel.

== Bibliography ==
- O'Donnell, John; Creswell, Toby; Mathieson, Craig (2010). 100 Best Australian Albums. Prahran, Vic: Hardie Grant Books. ISBN 978-1-74066-955-9.
