= Toby Creswell =

Australian journalist

- Born: 21 May 1955 (age 71); Sydney, New South Wales, Australia
- Occupations: Journalist, editor, author
- Partner: Samantha Trenoweth
- Children: Alice
- Writing career
- Subject: Rock music
- Notable works: The Real Thing: Adventures in Australian Rock & Roll, 1957-Now; 1001 Australians You Should Know

Toby Creswell (born 21 May 1955) is an Australian music journalist and pop-culture writer. He was editor of Rolling Stone (Australia) and a founding editor of Juice.

In 1986, he co-wrote, his first book, Too Much Ain't Enough a biography of pub rocker and former Cold Chisel vocalist Jimmy Barnes. He also co-wrote with Martin Fabinyi The Real Thing: Adventures in Australian Rock & Roll, 1957-Now (1999) and 1001 Australians You Should Know (2006). The latter was written with his domestic partner, fellow writer and journalist, Samantha Trenoweth.

== Biography ==
Creswell wrote his first article on rock & roll for Nation Review in 1972. He subsequently wrote articles about all aspects of popular culture and music for RAM, Billboard, Roadrunner and a range of national and international magazines and newspapers. He has worked for MTV and a variety of television programs as a writer and presenter. As a keyboard player for seminal post-punk band, Surfside 6, he wrote the B-side, "School's Out", to their 1980 hit single, "Cool in the Tube".

In 1985 he became editor of the Australian edition of Rolling Stone and two years later was in a partnership which took over the franchise. He continued to edit Rolling Stone until September 1992. The following year he started, in partnership with Lesa Belle Furhagen, the publishing company Terraplane Press/Terraplanet and was editorial director of the magazines Juice, HQ, Monument, Big Hit and Australian Style.

Creswell co-authored, with Martin Fabinyi, his first book in 1986, Too Much Ain't Enough, which is a biography of Jimmy Barnes, former lead vocalist for pub rock band Cold Chisel. In 1999 his second book, also co-written with Fabinyi, was The Real Thing: Adventures in Australian Rock & Roll, which is a history of Australian rock and roll between 1957 and the late 1990s. In 2000 a disastrous share float crippled the publishing company, Terraplane Press/Terraplanet, and led to its eventual dissolution in 2002.

In 2003 he wrote Love is in the Air: Stories of Australian Pop Music, an oral history of Australian pop based on the interviews conducted mainly by Clinton Walker for the ABC TV series, Love is in the Air, and in 2006 published 1001 Australians you should know, which he co-authored with his domestic partner, fellow journalist and writer, Samantha Trenoweth.

Creswell has also worked in television, producing a variety show for SBS and as the writer for two series of documentaries, Great Australian Albums in 2007 and 2008, each episode examining one of eight classic Australian albums over four decades. He was also the producer of The National Karaoke Challenge.

His book, 1001 Songs, is used by Brian Nankervis, creator, producer and adjudicator of the SBS program RocKwiz, as a source of information for questions.

In 2012, Creswell was executive producer of Paul Kelly: Stories of Me, a documentary about Australian singer-songwriter Paul Kelly.

== Bibliography ==
- Creswell, Toby; Martin Fabinyi (1986). Too Much Ain't Enough. Milsons Point, NSW: Random House. ISBN 0-09-182818-X.
- Creswell, Toby (1999). The Real Thing: Adventures in Australian Rock & Roll, 1957-now. Milsons Point, NSW: Random House. ISBN 978-0-09-183547-7.
- Creswell, Toby (2003). Love is in the Air: Stories of Australian Pop Music. Sydney, NSW: ABC Books. ISBN 978-0-7333-1322-6.
- Creswell, Toby (2007) [2005]. 1001 Songs: The Great Songs of All Time and the Artists, Stories and Secrets Behind Them (RocKwiz ed.). Prahran, Vic: Hardie Grant. ISBN 978-1-74066-458-5.
- Creswell, Toby; Samantha Trenoweth (2006). 1001 Australians you should know. North Melbourme, Victoria: Pluto Press Australia. ISBN 978-1-86403-361-8.
- Creswell, Toby (2008). Notorious Australians: the mad, the bad and the dangerous. Ultimo, NSW: ABC Books. ISBN 978-0-7333-1717-0.
- O'Donnell, John; Creswell, Toby; Mathieson, Craig (2010). 100 Best Australian Albums. Prahran, Vic: Hardie Grant Books. ISBN 978-1-74066-955-9.
