= Jeremy Smith (Australian musician) =

Australian rock musician

- Born: Jeremy Stuart Smith; Melbourne, Victoria, Australia
- Genres: Rock
- Occupation: Musician
- Instruments: French horn, guitars, keyboards, programming, backing vocals

Jeremy Stuart Smith is an Australian rock musician; he was a founding member of Hunters & Collectors on French horn, guitars, keyboards, programming, and backing vocals (1981–1998). Smith worked on Ghostwriters' 1996 album, Second Skin.

== Biography ==
Jeremy Smith is a Melbourne-based musician; he was a member of Hunters & Collectors on French horn, guitars, keyboards, programming, and backing vocals (1981–1998) and worked on Ghostwriters' 1996 album, Second Skin.

He provided percussion elements for some Midnight Oil tracks and recorded horns on their album, Redneck Wonderland. Smith also played on their album Scream In Blue. He also composed the theme music for Wolf Blass, an Australian winery.
