= True Tears of Joy =

Single by Hunters & Collectors

from the album Cut
- B-side: "This Morning"
- Released: 23 November 1992
- Recorded: 1991–92; Festival Studios, Sydney
- Genre: Pub rock
- Length: 4:20
- Label: White/Mushroom
- Songwriters: John Archer, Doug Falconer, John "Jack" Howard, Robert Miles, Barry Palmer, Mark Seymour, Jeremy Smith, Michael Waters
- Producers: Don Gehman, Rick Will, Hunters & Collectors

Hunters & Collectors singles chronology
"We the People" (1992)	"True Tears of Joy" (1992)	"Holy Grail" (1993)

"True Tears of Joy" was the fourth single from Australian pub rockers, Hunters & Collectors' seventh studio album, Cut. It was released after the album on 23 November 1992. It peaked at No. 14 on the ARIA Singles Chart – the highest-charting single of their career – and No. 47 on the New Zealand Singles Chart. "True Tears of Joy" was co-written by band members John Archer, Doug Falconer, Jack Howard, Robert Miles, Barry Palmer, Mark Seymour, Jeremy Smith, and Michael Waters.

== Background ==
Australian pub rockers Hunters & Collectors released "True Tears of Joy" on 23 November 1992 a month after their seventh studio album, Cut, which was issued in October. The track was co-written by band members John Archer on bass guitar, Doug Falconer on drums, Jack Howard on trumpet, Robert Miles on live sound, Barry Palmer on guitar, Mark Seymour on lead vocals, Jeremy Smith on French horn, and Michael Waters on keyboards and trombone.

"True Tears of Joy" was released as a CD single on White Label/Mushroom Records and, as with the album, was co-produced by Don Gehman and Hunters & Collectors, with Rick Will as the assistant producer. The single reached No. 14 on the ARIA Singles Chart and although it did not enter the top 50 until February 1993 it became the highest-charting single of their career. It peaked No. 47 on the New Zealand Singles Chart.

In the liner notes for the band's compilation album, Natural Selection, Seymour provides the following description for the song; "She's standing at the gate about to depart for Tokyo to pursue dubious employment. She doesn't want to go, doesn't know why she's going, runs off... tears streaming down her face. Hardly joyous. That came later."

Seymour provided an acoustic version for his fourth solo album, Daytime and the Dark, which was released in May 2005. A cover version of "True Tears of Joy" by Paul Kelly with Emma Donovan and Jimblah was included on the 2013 tribute album, Crucible – The Songs of Hunters & Collectors. Kelly commented that the artists, Donovan and Jimblah, that he recorded the track with in the previous November, together with the producers, Tim Levinson (Urthboy) and Angus Stuart (El Gusto) were "a good little team all in one room".

== Reception ==
Bevan Hannan of The Canberra Times in a review of Cut describes how "Mark Seymour is also in excellent form up-front, mainly in the ballads, with 'True Tears of Joy' a real beauty".

== Track listing ==
CD single
No.	Title	Writer(s)	Length
1.	"True Tears of Joy"	John Archer, Doug Falconer, Jack Howard, Robert Miles, Barry Palmer, Mark Seymour, Jeremy Smith, Michael Waters	4:20
2.	"Another One Like You"	Archer, Falconer, Howard, Miles, Seymour, Smith, Palmer, Waters	3:29

== Personnel ==
Credited to:

Hunters & Collectors members

- John Archer – bass guitar
- Doug Falconer – drums
- John 'Jack' Howard – trumpet
- Robert Miles – live sound, art director
- Barry Palmer - lead guitar
- Mark Seymour – vocals, guitar
- Jeremy Smith – French horn
- Michael Waters – trombone, keyboards

Recording details

- Producer – Don Gehman
  - Associate producer/mixing – Rick Will
  - Assistant mixing – Lori Fumer
- Remixing – Tony Espie
- Studios – Festival Studios, Sydney (recording); Platinum Studios, Melbourne
  - The Grey Room; Larabee Studios, Los Angeles (mixing)

== Charts ==
Chart (1993)	Peak position
Australia (ARIA)	14
New Zealand (Recorded Music NZ)	47
