= Tony Floyd =

Australian Drummer, Vocalist and Percussionist

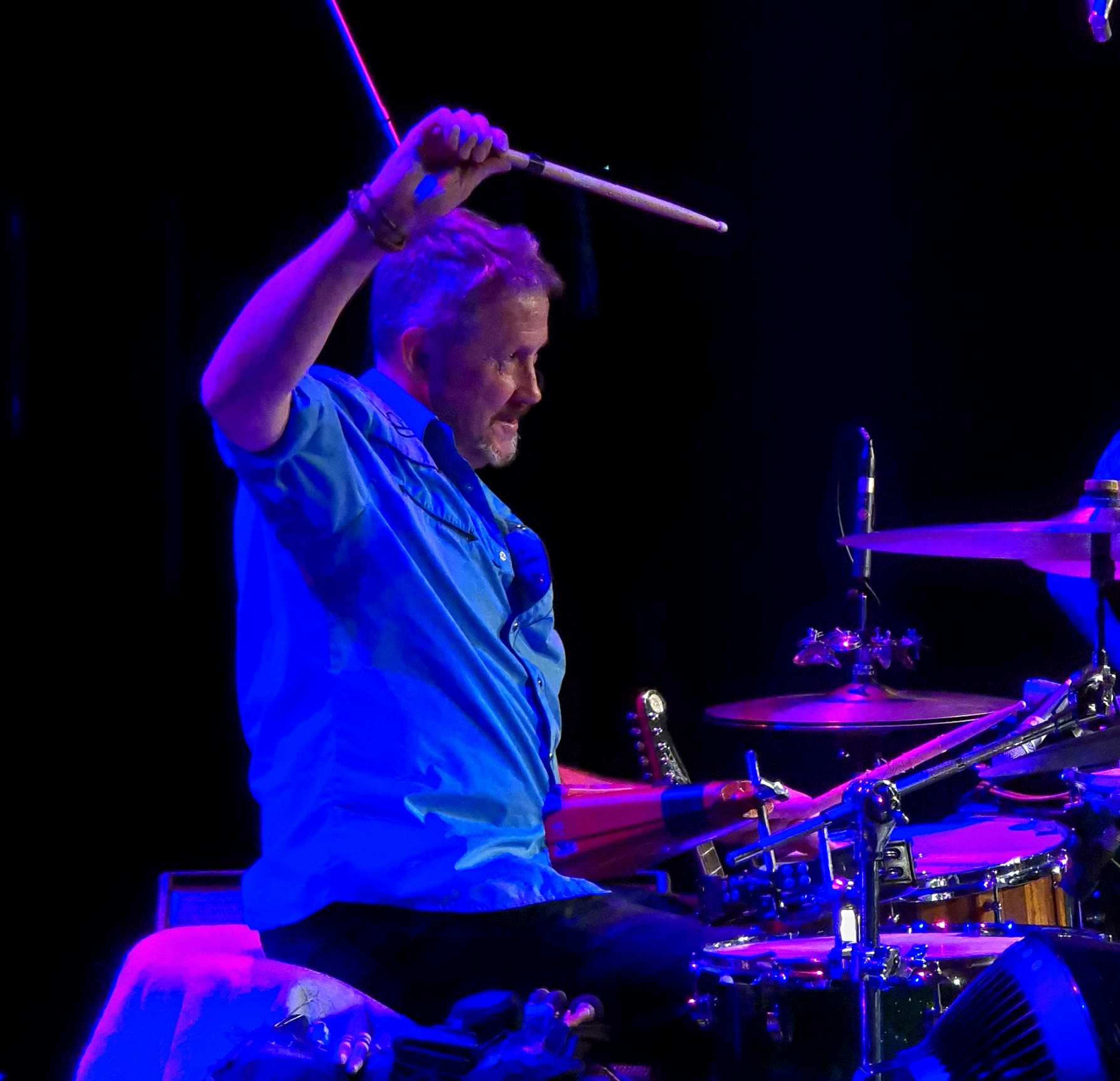
- Tony Floyd playing with Black Sorrows 2026

Background information
- Born: Antony Floyd; 1966 (age 59–60); Melbourne
- Genres: Jazz, Rock, Pop, Folk, Blues
- Occupations: Musician, Drummer, Percussionist, Singer, Educator, Session Musician
- Instruments: Drums, Vocals, Percussion
- Years active: 1986- present
- Members: The Black Sorrows, Things of Stone and Wood
- Website: tonyfloyddrums.com

Tony Floyd (legal name Antony Floyd) is an Australian drummer, percussionist, vocalist, session musician, and music educator based in Melbourne, Victoria. He is known for his long-term work with the band The Black Sorrows, being a founding member of the band Things of Stone and Wood and collaborations across Australian Jazz and contemporary music since the 1980s. He is active in live performance, studio recording, and music education.

== Early life and education ==
Tony Floyd was born in Australia, developed an interest in drumming at an early age and became a professional musician in his mid-teens. He began studying drums in his early teens and was strongly influenced by Jazz records played in his family home. He studied with Melbourne drummer Mauro Perez from the age of 12, developing skills in music reading and performance across multiple styles while participating in school Jazz ensembles. He later pursued formal music education, studying percussion and drum set performance. He holds a Bachelor of Education (Music) from Melbourne University (1990). His training laid the foundation for a career that would combine professional performance with music education.

== Career ==
=== Early career ===
Floyd was active in Melbourne’s Jazz scene in the late-1980s. In a 1986 feature on Australian Jazz vocalist and trumpeter Vince Jones in Juke magazine, he was referenced in connection with the city’s Jazz community. Floyd played with Vince Jones from approximately 1986 to 1989, appearing on studio albums It All Ends Up in Tears (1987) and Trustworthy Little Sweethearts (1988) as well as making TV appearances with Jones’ band. Floyd later described joining Jones’ band at nineteen as a formative experience, performing alongside leading Australian Jazz musicians in what he later called a “great learning environment,” leading to further professional opportunities within Melbourne’s Jazz scene in small-ensemble jazz settings and club residencies. Working within Jones’s repertoire of standards and contemporary Jazz compositions, Floyd demonstrated sensitive accompaniment and dynamic control, supporting vocal phrasing while maintaining a fluid rhythmic foundation. This early association positioned him within Australia’s established Jazz circuit and helped lead to further collaborations across both Jazz and contemporary music scenes.

=== Things of Stone and Wood ===
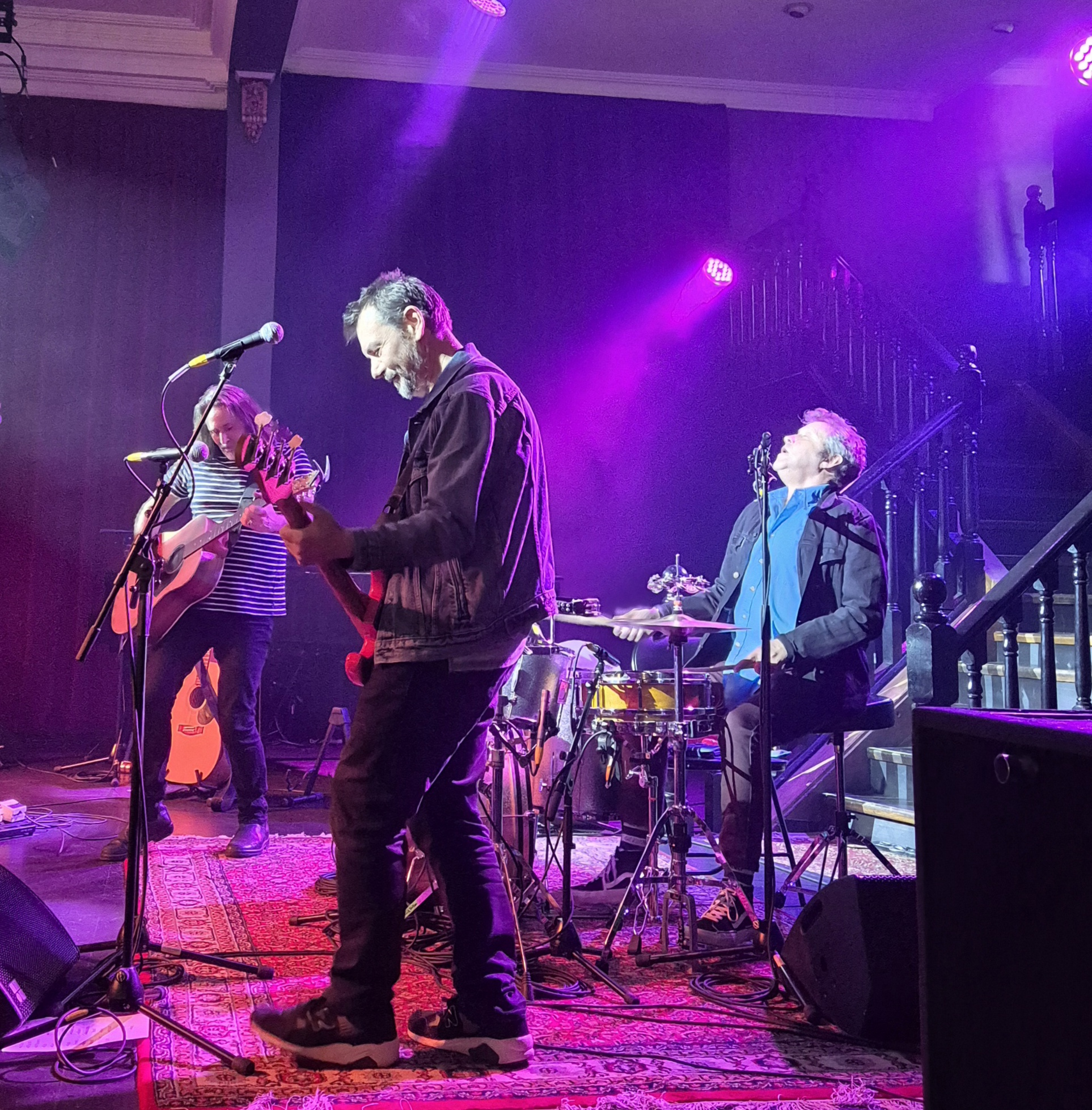
Things of Stone and Wood, The Brunswick Ballroom, 2025

Floyd is drummer for the Melbourne band Things of Stone and Wood, formed in 1989. Contemporary press has described Floyd as arriving in the band with “impressive credentials” from work with Vince Jones and Ross Wilson. He was also identified as the band’s “Jazz drummer,” and quoted discussing the group’s approach to “sincere music.”

The band signed with Sony Music in the early 1990s and released the album The Yearning in 1993. Their single Happy Birthday Helen achieved national chart success and in 1993 the group won the ARIA Award for Best New Talent. The single helped push the group into the mainstream, with contemporary press describing it as a surprise success.

By 1994, Things of Stone and Wood had toured internationally, including time in Europe and Canada, and reported strong audience response particularly to live performances. The band continued recording and planned further releases, while maintaining an emphasis on live performance and developing their sound between records.

The Final Forest Album Launch, The Brunswick Ballroom, November 2026

Things of Stone and Wood have continued to perform periodically since their success in the early 1990’s. A new album, Rae Street, was released in February 2026 and debuted at number 10 on the ARIA Top 20 Australian Albums for the week of 23 March 2026. To promote the new album, the band embarked on a national tour which mostly featured Greg Arnold and Michael Allen with Floyd joining on dates that his busy touring and performance schedule allowed.

A second album for 2026, The Final Forest was released on 30th October 2026 supported by a national tour featuring the trio across Australia from November 2026 through January 2027, at venues in Melbourne, Brisbane, Canberra, Sydney, Perth, Fremantle, and Tasmania.

=== The Black Sorrows ===
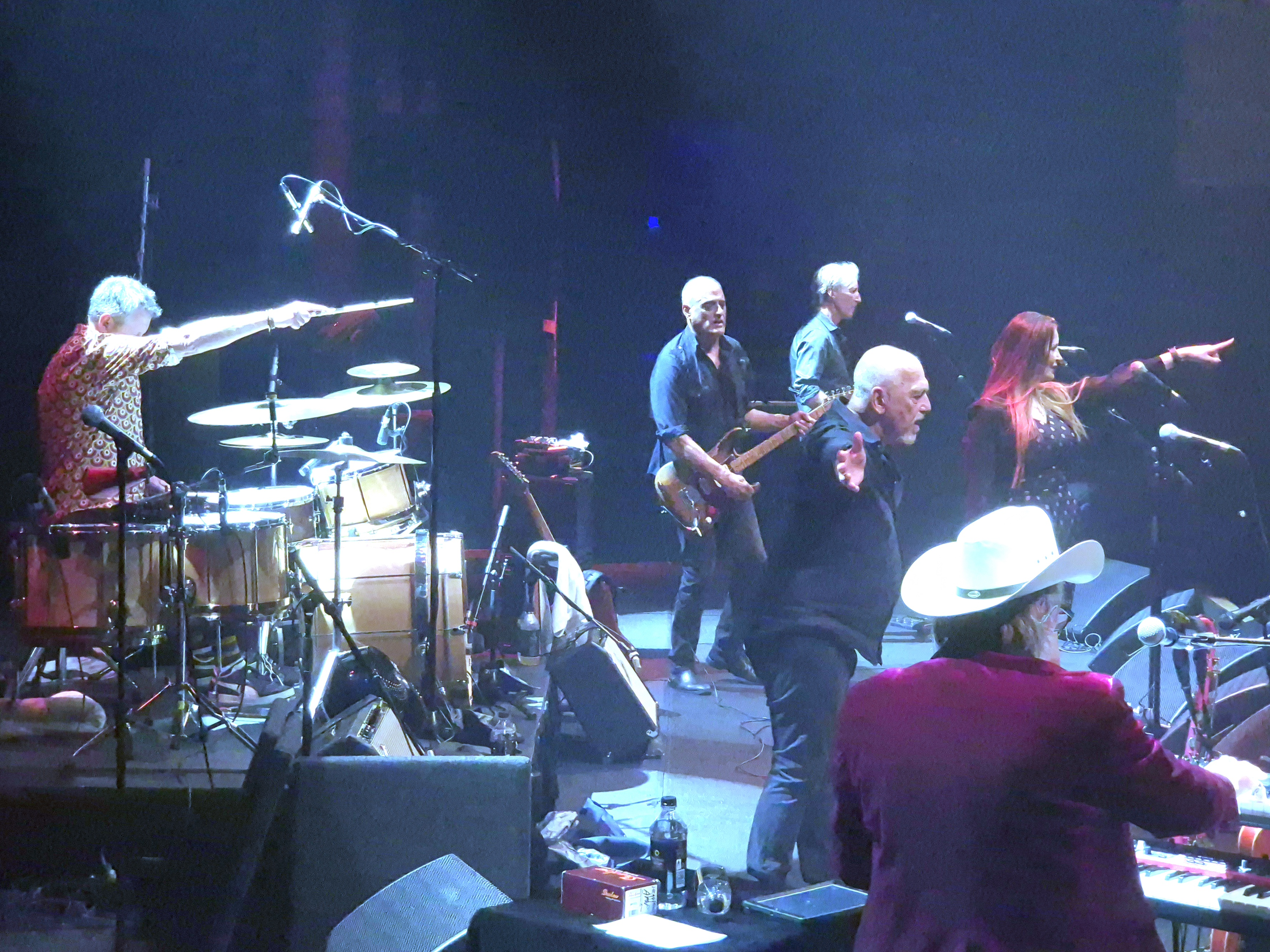
The Black Sorrows, Melbourne Recital Centre, 2025

Floyd joined Australian blues rock band The Black Sorrows in 1995 and remains involved in the group’s frequent national and international touring and recording activities as a band member.

Floyd was interviewed in the 2011 documentary Joe Camilleri: Australia’s Maltese Falcon directed by Fiona Cochrane about Joe Camilleri’s life and music career. In the award-winning documentary, Floyd described Joe as “incredibly eclectic in a blues/jazz/funk style” and mentioning his involvement with Joe over many years in his other bands The Revelators and Bakelite Radio. The documentary includes interviews with Floyd, footage of his drumming in the studio in 2010 during the recording of The Black Sorrows' Crooked Little Thoughts album, and includes performance footage of Floyd as drummer with the band over a number of years.

== Musical style ==
Floyd’s playing developed from a strong Jazz background into a cross-genre approach spanning Jazz, pop and rock performance. He has spoken about the challenge of adapting from Jazz improvisation to contemporary pop and rock settings, emphasising groove, simplicity and dynamic control.

Floyd has also been active in contemporary jazz ensembles centred on improvised performance, including recordings documented in academic research examining approaches to jazz improvisation and ensemble interaction. Within such settings, his playing emphasises dynamic sensitivity, rhythmic flexibility and responsive accompaniment supporting collective improvisation.

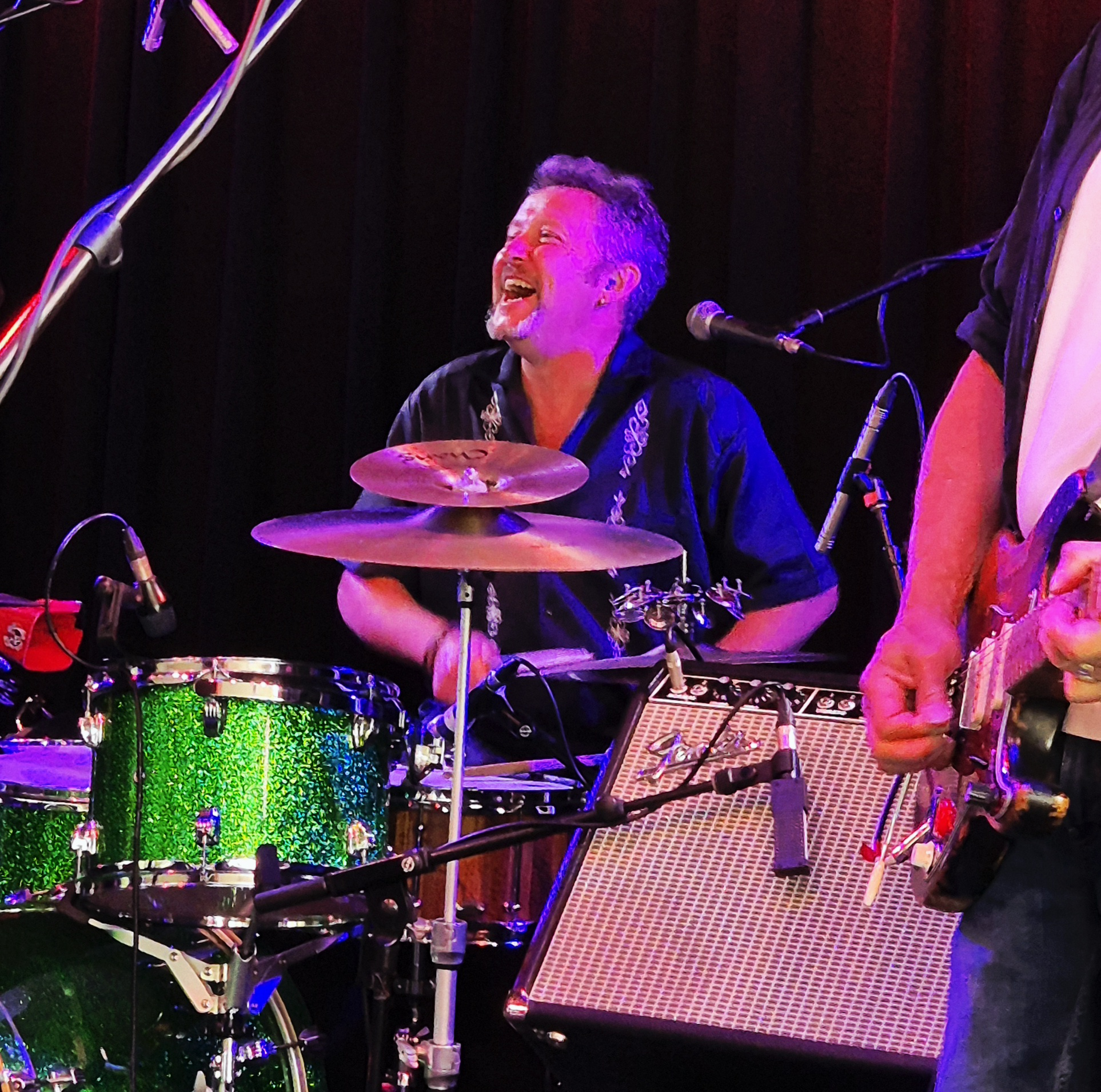
Tony Floyd with The Black Sorrows at Archies Creek January 2026

Long-time collaborator Joe Camilleri encouraged Floyd to combine Jazz dynamics with strong, simple groove playing, an approach that Floyd has identified as central to his work across genres.

== Session work and collaborations ==
Floyd has worked extensively as a session and touring drummer across Jazz and contemporary music, appearing on numerous recordings and regularly performing live with a wide range of musicians. He was interviewed in a podcast episode focusing on drumming and his career, discussing his experiences with notable Australian and international artists.

His collaborations include performances and recordings with artists such as Ross Wilson, Men at Work, Mark Seymour, Deborah Conway, Renée Geyer and Eurogliders, reflecting a career spanning rock, pop, blues and contemporary music.

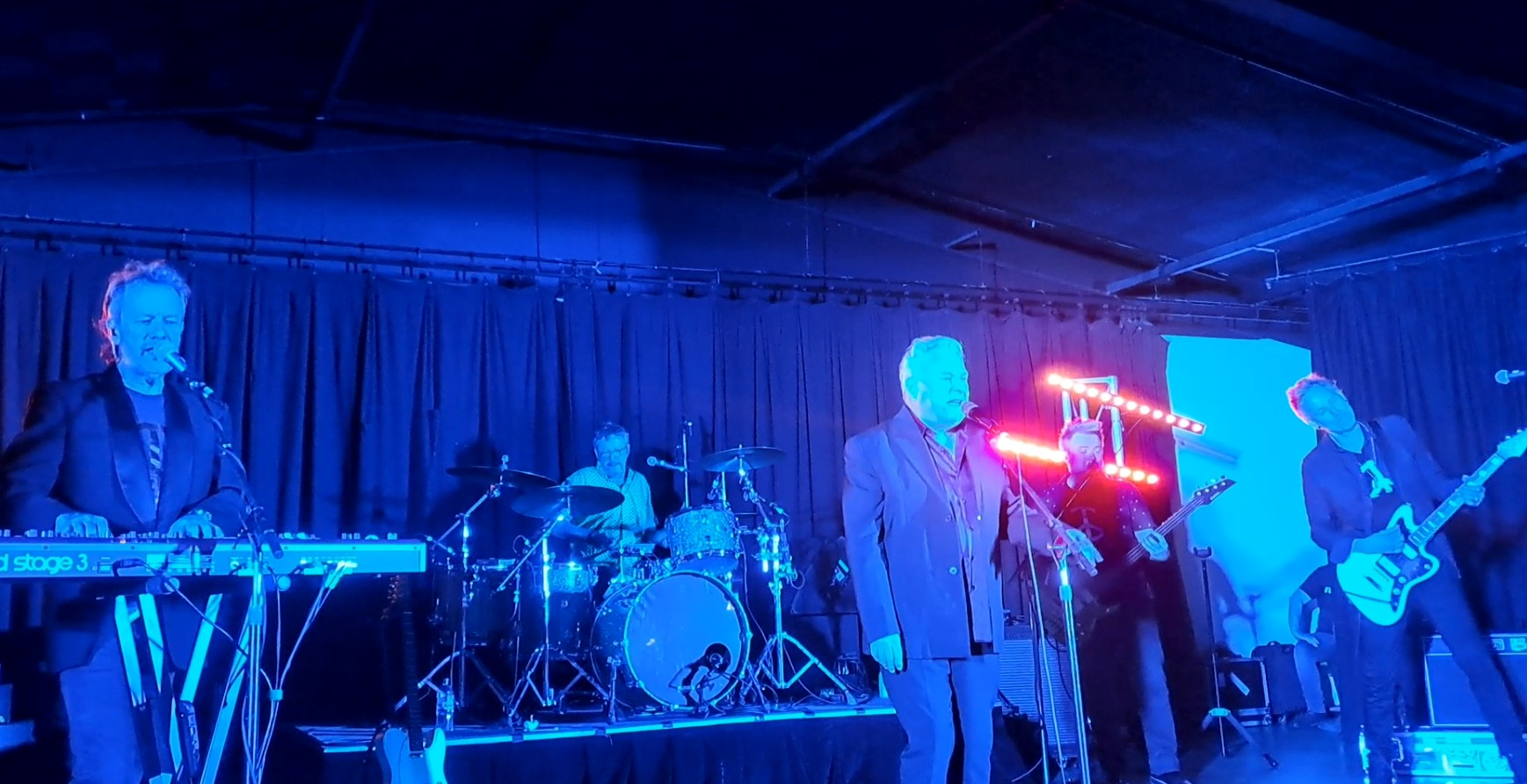
Tony Floyd playing with Ross Wilson's Band in Portarlington, 2025

Floyd contributed as session drummer to Ross Wilson’s 1989 solo album Dark Side of the Man and later toured as drummer for Men at Work during the band’s Brazilian reunion tour in 1997, appearing on the live album Men at Work – Brazil.

Floyd has also performed and recorded with Australian vocalists including Deborah Conway and Renée Geyer appearing in touring bands and studio projects with them across the 2000s and 2010s.

Floyd has worked extensively with Australian singer-songwriter Mark Seymour performing and recording with Seymour’s touring and studio bands. He is credited on drums on tracks from Seymour’s albums Westgate and Daytime And The Dark and was among the core musicians associated with Seymour’s work around the One Eyed Man period. Floyd was drummer for Mark Seymour's performance of the Hunters and Collectors song Holy Grail as an opening entertainment act at the 2002 AFL Grand Final.

Floyd has also performed with Australian band Eurogliders as part of the group’s later live lineup and is credited for Percussion on the album Don’t Eat the Daisies.

Floyd’s most significant later collaboration was with Yolŋu musician Gurrumul, with whom he toured and recorded extensively. In a 2011 review in the Sydney Morning Herald, Bruce Elder described Floyd’s “low-key drumming” as helping to “lift and enrich” Gurrumul’s arrangements. In 2013, Floyd performed with Gurrumul at the Sydney Opera House as part of the Vivid Live festival. This recording was later released as an album Gurrumul and the Sydney Symphony Orchestra: His Life And Music which won the 2014 ARIA for Best Original Soundtrack/Cast/Show Album. Floyd played on Gurrumul’s third album The Gospel Album which went on to win the ARIA Award for Best World Music Album at the ARIA Music Awards of 2015. Floyd also played with Gurrumul in his band at an ABC Studio recording (broadcast session) of All God’s Children accompanied by The Inner West Choir. Floyd appears in the documentary Gurrumul (2018), directed by Paul Williams, about the life of the celebrated musician.

In 2021, Floyd joined The 2021 APIA Good Times Tour which featured a rotating line-up of performers including Brian Cadd, Kate Ceberano, Joe Camilleri, Wendy Matthews, Deborah Conway, Vika & Linda, John Paul Young and Leo Sayer over a national tour of 16 shows. The tour presented a program of well-known pop, rock and soul repertoire performed across major Australian venues. Floyd performed as drummer in the tour’s backing band, providing the rhythmic foundation for the shows. His playing supported repertoire spanning rock, pop and soul, contributing to the musical continuity required in the tour’s multi-artist format. Floyd’s role helped ensure a cohesive live presentation throughout the tour and was described as "the engine room" of the music along with bassist Travis Clarke.

At the 2025 APRA Music Awards in Melbourne, singer-songwriter Lior performed a cover of These Days by Powderfinger as the ceremony’s opening act with Floyd and other percussionists supporting the musical arrangement.

== Jazz performance and recording ==
In the years after working with Vince Jones, Floyd collaborated with noted Jazz artists such as Paul Grabowsky, Tony Gould and James Sherlock in his horn-based groove project Dodge.

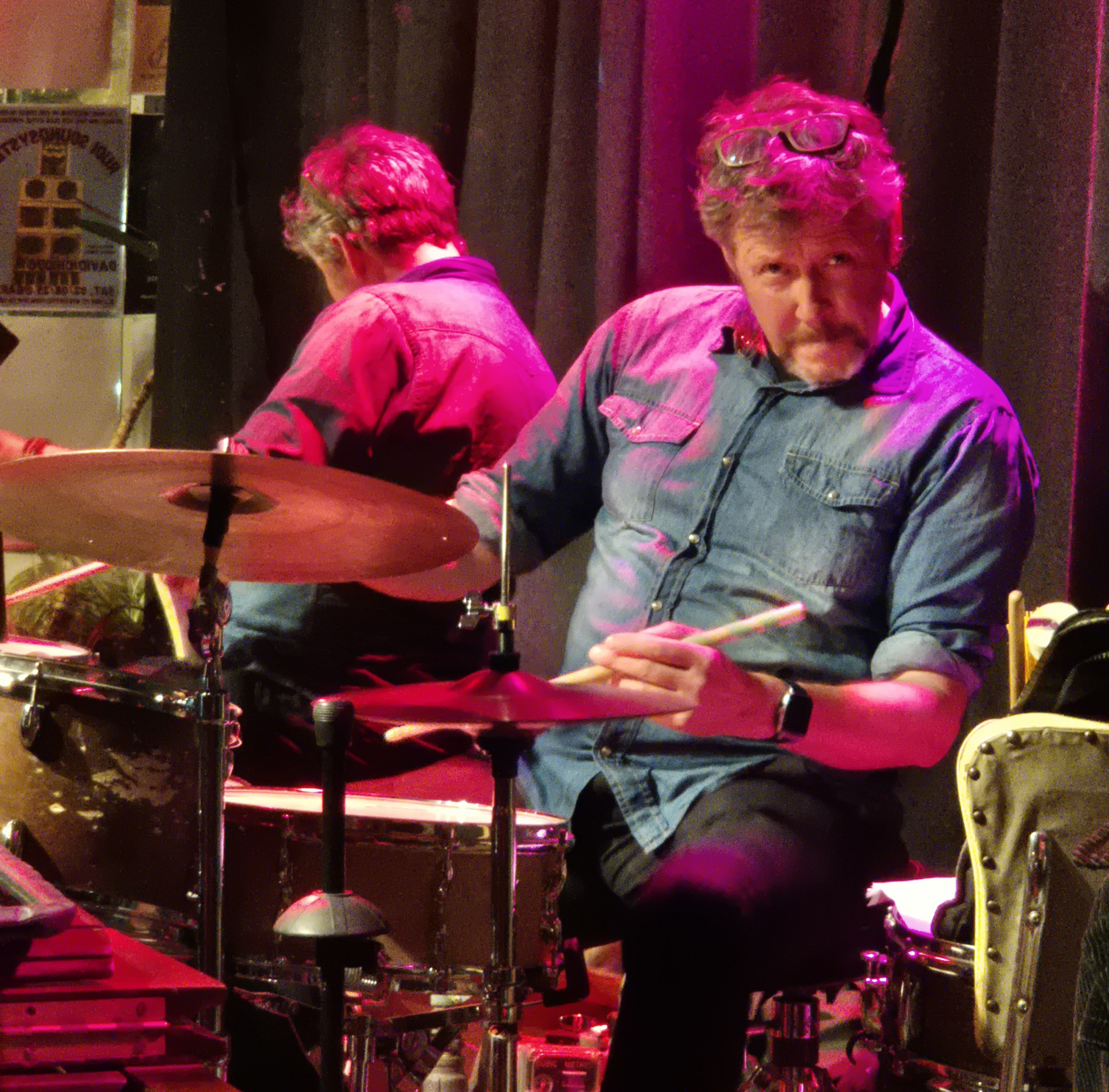
Tony Floyd performing with Clayton Dooley in 2025

Floyd has maintained an active presence within Melbourne’s contemporary Jazz scene. He has been featured in performance coverage by AustralianJazz.net, including a 2009 review of the opening night of the Stonnington Jazz Festival at Bennett’s Lane, where his drumming was noted as part of the festival’s headline ensemble; a 2011 feature on a long-gestating reunion performance at Bennett’s Lane Jazz Club and a 2014 concert review highlighting his contribution to a collaborative Melbourne Jazz project. These appearances reflect his ongoing engagement with Australia’s small-ensemble Jazz community alongside his broader session and touring career.

In 2014, Floyd was a member of the ensemble The Hunters and Pointers whose album The Hunters & Pointers was nominated for the 2014 ARIA Award for Best Jazz Album. A review by AustralianJazz.net described the project as rooted in melodic interplay and ensemble cohesion. The review situates the recording within Australia’s modern Jazz landscape, noting the group’s emphasis on collective dynamics and subtle rhythmic development, with Floyd contributing to the album’s understated and responsive rhythmic framework.

== Teaching and influence ==
Floyd has worked in tertiary music education since his graduation from Melbourne University in 1990. He has been listed as a staff member in Music Performance at Monash University’s Sir Zelman Cowen School of Music.

In addition to his performing career, Tony Floyd has been active in Australian music education as a drum teacher and mentor. Independent educator profiles and alumni biographies frequently cite Floyd among the instructors who contributed to their professional development, particularly through programs associated with Box Hill Institute and Monash University. These third-party references position Floyd as an influential mentor whose teaching has contributed to the development of numerous Australian drummers and drum teachers, forming a significant part of his work as an educator.

Floyd has emphasised the importance of Jazz history and listening as part of musician development, encouraging students to study both influential Jazz artists and contemporary popular music as part of their training.

Floyd was profiled in DRUMscene magazine in Issue 78, where his early Jazz background, recording career, and teaching work were discussed. The profile described Floyd as a versatile performer and educator active across performance and teaching.

In his 2023 book A Ramble on Humour & Music, Jazz pianist and composer Tony Gould described Floyd as “a fine example of a cross genre musician” and referred to him as a “brilliant Jazz drummer and educator.”

== Discography highlights ==
Floyd has contributed to more than 100 albums over his career, beginning with Vince Jones’ album It All Ends Up In Tears (1987). Notable albums include:

- Ross Wilson – Dark Side Of The Man (1989)
- Vince Jones – Trustworthy Little Sweethearts (1991)
- Things of Stone and Wood – The Yearning (1993)
- The Black Sorrows – Beat Club (1998)
- Mark Seymour – One Eyed Man (2001)
- Joe Camilleri And The Black Sorrows – One Mo" Time (2004)
- The Hunters & Pointers - The Hunters & Pointers (2014) – nominated for 2014 ARIA Award for Best Jazz Album.
- Gurrumul – The Gospel Album (2015) – winner of 2015 ARIA Award for Best World Album.
- MacDonald - Burke - Grabowsky - Haywood - Floyd – Dangerous Decision (2022)

Additional recording credits include collaborations across Jazz, rock, pop, and folk projects from the 1990's to present. (See Discography).

== Videography ==
- Things of Stone and Wood: The Hopeful (1991) – Music video
- Things of Stone and Wood: Share This Wine (1992) – Music video
- Things of Stone and Wood: Happy Birthday Helen (1992) –Music video
- Things of Stone and Wood: Rock This Boat (1993) – Music video
- Things of Stone and Wood: In Our Home (1993) – Music video
- Things of Stone and Wood: Single Perfect Raindrop (1993) – Music video
- Things of Stone and Wood: Wildflowers (1994) – Music video
- Things of Stone and Wood: Ship Of The Damned (2002) - Music video
- Stoned Bros (2009) – Film. Music Department, Drums
- Floyd has appeared in multiple music videos with Bakelite Radio and The Black Sorrows between 2009 and 2024
- The Black Sorrows 4 Days in Sing Sing (2009) – DVD
- Joe Camilleri: Australia’s Maltese Falcon (2011) – DVD
- The Boy Castaways (2013) – Film. Music Department, Drums
- Gurrumul – Jesu (2015) – Music video
- Gurrumul - (2018) – Film, documentary directed by Paul Williams
