= Titanic (Mark Seymour album) =

Studio album by Mark Seymour
- Released: September 2007
- Genre: Rock, pop
- Length: 51:39
- Label: Liberation Blue
- Producer: Cameron McKenzie

Mark Seymour chronology
Westgate (2007)	Titanic (2007)	Undertow (2011)

Titanic is the sixth studio album by Australian musician Mark Seymour.

It was the second in the Liberation Blue series of acoustic versions, following Daytime and the Dark in 2005.

The album received a favorable review in the Sydney Morning Herald.

== Track listing ==
(Words by Mark Seymour, music by Hunters & Collectors except where indicated)

1. "Say Goodbye" – 3:40
2. "True Believers" – 4:04
3. "The One & Only You" – 3:27
4. "Back in the Hole" – 3:37
5. "Blind Eye" – 3:32
6. "She's Not Fooling Around" – 3:59
7. "Titanic" – 3:54
8. "Everything's on Fire" – 3:37
9. "Long Way to the Water" – 4:33
10. "Talking to a Stranger" - 3:06
11. "Hear No Evil" – 3:26
12. "When You Fall" – 3:32
13. "Dog" – 3:16
14. "Parting Glass" (Traditional) – 3:55

== Personnel ==
- Mark Seymour - guitars, vocals
- Cameron McKenzie - guitars, percussion
- Jake Mason - keyboards

== Charts ==
Chart performance for Titanic
Chart (2007)	Peak position
Australian Albums (ARIA)	197
