= Single Perfect Raindrop =

- CD single cover

Single by Things of Stone and Wood

from the album The Yearning
- Released: June 1993
- Length: 4:08
- Label: Capitol
- Songwriter(s): Greg Arnold
- Producer(s): James Black, Martin Pullan

Things of Stone and Wood singles chronology
"Rock This Boat" (1993)	"Single Perfect Raindrop" (1993)	"Wildflowers" (1994)

"Single Perfect Raindrop" is a song written by Greg Arnold and recorded by Australian folk-rock band Things of Stone and Wood. The song was released in June 1993 as the fourth and final single from the band's debut studio album The Yearning. "Single Perfect Raindrop" peaked at number 50 on the ARIA Charts.

== Track listing ==
Australian CD Single
No.	Title	Length
1.	"Single Perfect Raindrop"	4:08
2.	"Share This Wine" (recorded Live at the Wireless in October 1992)	3:59
3.	"Wrapped" (recorded Live at the Wireless in October 1992)	4:30
4.	"Heidelberg" (recorded Live at the Wireless in October 1992)	3:50
5.	"Happy Birthday Helen" (recorded Live at the Wireless in October 1992)	4:04

== Charts ==
Chart (1993)	Peak position
Australia (ARIA)	50
