= Wild Flowers (Things of Stone and Wood song) =

"Wildflowers"
- CD single cover

Single by Things of Stone and Wood

from the album Junk Theatre
- Released: August 1994
- Genre: Rock
- Label: Capitol
- Songwriter(s): Greg Arnold
- Producer(s): James Black

Things of Stone and Wood singles chronology
"Single Perfect Raindrop" (1993)	"Wildflowers" (1994)	"Churchill's Black Dog" (1995)

"Wildflowers" is a song written by Greg Arnold and recorded by Australian folk-rock band Things of Stone and Wood. The song was released in August 1994 as the lead single from the band's second studio album Junk Theatre. "Wildflowers" peaked at number 41 on the ARIA Charts in September 1994.

The record label were resistant in releasing "Wildflowers" as the lead single due to the word Nazi in the song's chorus, but writer Greg Arnold insisted. The song became the most played Australian single on radio in October 1994.

In a review of the album, Jonathan Lewis from AllMusic said the song is commentary "on the rise of racism in Australia".

== Track listing ==
CD Single
No.	Title	Length
1.	"Wildflowers"
2.	"Angel"
3.	"Across the Grain"
4.	"Frankie Grins at His Millionth Sin"
5.	"Ghosts of Castlemaine"

== Charts ==
Chart (1994)	Peak position
Australia (ARIA)	41
