= Cut (Hunters and Collectors album) =

Studio album by Hunters & Collectors
- Released: 5 October 1992
- Recorded: 1991–1992; Festival Studio, Sydney; Platinum Studio, Melbourne
- Genre: Australian rock
- Length: 49:15
- Label: White/Mushroom
- Producers: Nick Sansano, Don Gehman, Hunters & Collectors

Hunters & Collectors chronology
Ghost Nation (1989)	Cut (1992)	Demon Flower (1994)

Singles from Cut
- 1. "Where Do You Go?" Released: 30 September 1991; 2. "Head Above Water" Released: July 1992; 3. "We the People" Released: September 1992; 4. "True Tears of Joy" Released: 23 November 1992; 5. "Holy Grail" Released: March 1993; 6. "Imaginary Girl" Released: August 1993

Cut is the seventh studio album by the Australian rock band, Hunters & Collectors. It was mostly produced by American Don Gehman with the group and issued by White Label/Mushroom on 5 October 1992. It reached No. 6 on the ARIA Albums Chart and No. 17 on the New Zealand Albums Chart. The band were nominated for Best Group at the 1992 ARIA Music Awards and Album of the Year for Cut in the following year.

"Where Do You Go" was co-produced with Nick Sansano and released as a single in September 1991, prior to commencing the rest of the album with Gehman, but it was included on Cut. Subsequent singles were "Head Above Water" (July 1992), "We the People" (September), "True Tears of Joy" (November), "Holy Grail" (March 1993) and "Imaginary Girl" (August), all appeared on the ARIA Singles Chart Top 100.

== Background ==
Hunters & Collectors' seventh studio album, Cut, was recorded from late 1991 and into 1992. The line-up of the group was John Archer on bass guitar; Doug Falconer on drums, backing vocals, programming, percussion and tape loops; Jack Howard on trumpet, keyboards and backing vocals; Robert Miles on live sound and art design; Barry Palmer on lead guitar; Mark Seymour on lead vocals and guitar; Jeremy Smith on French horn, keyboards, guitars and backing vocals; and Michael Waters on keyboards and trombone.

In 1991 Seymour and Smith travelled to United States and Europe and had discussions with over twenty different producers; aiming to evolve the band's sound. In an interview with Australian Style magazine Seymour stated "We were becoming too aware of our peer group. The thing is, if you’re forever playing in Australia and growing in Australia – and not having much success internationally – it's like you're bouncing off the walls musically".

In September 1991 the band issued the lead single, "Where Do You Go", which was co-produced by Nick Sansano and the group. The single version was backed by three live tracks, "When the River Runs Dry", "Love All Over Again" and "Do You See What I See?", which had been recorded at a gig in November the previous year at the Myer Music Bowl. It reached No. 33 on the ARIA Singles Chart and No. 49 in New Zealand.

The rest of the tracks on Cut were co-produced by the band with US-based Don Gehman (R.E.M., John Mellencamp). He incorporated electronic percussion and drum loops into their sound. In an article in Rolling Stone (Australia), Gehman explained "They wanted change but when it came to it there was a lot of mumbling in the ranks, there was resistance, but I just stuck to my guns"; and concluded that the change was ultimately beneficial.

In January 1994 Nicole Leedham of The Canberra Times related that "according to reports, Hunters were not happy with Cut, feeling that the style was dictated by outside forces – a producer and an engineer". Seymour later described making Cut: "[Gehman] was basically deconstructing the band's songwriting process and looking for hits. It almost went wrong. It wasn't a happy time for us. The band almost broke up over that – there was so much internal tension".

Nevertheless, the album appeared on 5 October 1992 and reached No. 6 on the ARIA Albums Chart and spent 41 weeks in the top 50. It is the longest charting and highest selling album from an Australian band for 1993. In New Zealand it peaked at No. 17 on their Albums Chart. Cut provided five more singles, which all reached the ARIA Singles Chart Top 100. The second single, "Head Above Water" (July 1992), was released as a four-track CD with three varieties of the title track. This disc was added as a bonus for the extended version of the album, which also appeared in October. "Head Above Water" peaked at No. 64 on the ARIA Singles Chart. The third single, "We the People", appeared a month earlier than the album and reached No. 70 in Australia and No. 36 in New Zealand. The fourth single, "True Tears of Joy" (November), peaked at No. 14 in Australia to become their highest-charting single, it also reached No. 47 on the New Zealand charts.

It was followed by an anthemic single, "Holy Grail" (March 1993). Seymour wrote the track, with Smith, after he had read a novel by Jeanette Winterson, The Passion (1987), detailing Napoleon's march to Russia in 1812. Seymour's lyrics also reflect the band's own flagging attempts to "crack" the American market and their recent "internal tension" while recording Cut. He recalled "I wanted to write a song to serve up this idea that regardless of what happens you've got to stay true to the quest". The single reached No. 20 in Australia and No. 25 in New Zealand. The song is often heard in context with the Australian Football League (AFL), and was Channel 10's theme song for their AFL TV coverage from 2002 to 2006, it was sung by Seymour at the 2002 AFL Grand Final. The sixth single from the album, "Imaginary Girl" (August 1993), reached No. 82 on the ARIA Singles Chart.

On 24 November 2017 a 2 CD expanded 25th anniversary edition was released on the Bloodlines label. Featuring the remastered 11 track album plus 6 "Offcuts" on disc one and 12 "Precuts" on disc two plus a further 5 "Postcuts". The release featured a total of 10 unreleased songs from the original Cut recording sessions.

== Reception ==
Professional ratings
Review scores
Source	Rating
Allmusic	3/5 stars
The Canberra Times	7/10 stars

In October 1992 Bevan Hannan of The Canberra Times declared "pub favourites Hunters & Collectors have definitely gone back to taws with" Cut by "relying heavily on the percussion influence which dominated their formative years". Allmusic's Mike DeGagne felt it was "brimming with high energy, explosive singing, and contagious hooks, making it one of this band's finest offerings". While the "bleakness in some of their songs is elevated by the instruments so that the conceptual message is understood, without the dismalness, making their music accessible".

The band were nominated for Best Group at the 1992 ARIA Music Awards and Album of the Year for Cut in the following year.

== Track listing ==
All lyrics are written by Mark Seymour; all music is composed by John Archer, Doug Falconer, Jack Howard, Robert Miles, Barry Palmer, Seymour, Jeremy Smith, Michael Waters; unless otherwise indicated

No.	Title	Length
1.	"Head Above Water"	4:19
2.	"Holy Grail"	3:43
3.	"Grindstone" aka "I Can't Help It"	3:47
4.	"True Tears of Joy"	4:20
5.	"We the People"	3:40
6.	"Hear no Evil"	4:14
7.	"Edge of Nowhere"	5:00
8.	"Love That I Long For"	5:21
9.	"Where Do You Go?"	3:56
10.	"Imaginary Girl"	4:55
11.	"Angel of Mercy"	5:54
Total length:		49:15

Extra tracks on Disc 1 of the 25th Anniversary Edition (subtitled "Offcuts")
No.	Title	Length
12.	"Tomorrow in Your Eyes"	3:53
13.	"Never Say Never"	3:19
14.	"If You Want Me"	3:03
15.	"Almost a Part of Me"	3:56
16.	"I Know"	4:34
17.	"Where Angels Fear to Tread"	3:18
Total length:		71:00

Disc 2 of the 25th Anniversary Edition (subtitled "Precuts" tracks 1–12 & "Postcuts" tracks 13–17)
No.	Title	Length
1.	"Head Above Water (demo)"	3:11
2.	"One More Day (demo)"	3:58
3.	"We the People (demo)"	3:23
4.	"True Tears of Joy (demo)"	3:41
5.	"Nightmare Machine (demo)"	4:38
6.	"Hear no Evil (demo)"	4:08
7.	"Where do you go? (demo)"	4:07
8.	"Wake Me Up (demo)"	4:18
9.	"Bull in a China Shop (demo)"	4:36
10.	"Love That I Long For (demo)"	5:26
11.	"Imaginary Girl (demo)"	3:29
12.	"Angel of Mercy (demo)"	5:02
13.	"True Tears of Joy (acoustic)"	3:43
14.	"Where do you go? (acoustic)"	3:14
15.	"Holy Grail (acoustic)"	3:21
16.	"Head Above Water (L.A.Piece Mix)"	4:42
17.	"We the People (Remix)"	7:06
Total length:		72:00

== Personnel ==
Credited to:

Hunters & Collectors members

- John Archer – bass guitar
- Doug Falconer – drums, backing vocals, programming, percussion, tape loops
- Jack Howard – trumpet, keyboards, backing vocals
- Robert Miles – live sound, art director
- Barry Palmer – Lead guitar
- Mark Seymour – lead vocals, guitars
- Jeremy Smith – French horn, keyboards, guitars, backing vocals
- Michael Waters – trombone, keyboards

Recording details

- Producer – Don Gehman, Hunters & Collectors, Nick Sansano ("Where Do You Go?")
  - Associate producer – Rick Will
- Mixer – Rickster (Rick Will)
  - Associate mixer – Lori Fumar
- Engineer – Nick Sansano ("Where Do You Go?")
- Mastering engineer – Rick O'Neil
- Studio – Festival Studios, Sydney; Platinum Studios, Melbourne; (recording). The Grey Room and Larrabee Sound Studios, Los Angeles (mixing)

== Charts and certifications ==
=== Weekly charts ===
Chart (1992–93)	Peak position
Australian Albums (ARIA)	6
New Zealand Albums (RMNZ)	17

=== Year-end charts ===
Chart (1993)	Position
New Zealand Albums (RMNZ)	48

=== Certifications ===
Region	Certification	Certified units/sales
Australia (ARIA)	Platinum	70,000^{^}
^{^} Shipments figures based on certification alone.
