= What's a Few Men? =

Studio album by Hunters & Collectors
- Released: 16 November 1987
- Recorded: September 1987
- Studios: Metropolis Audio, Melbourne
- Genre: Rock
- Length: 54:28
- Labels: White/Mushroom (AUS/NZ); I.R.S. (US)
- Producers: Greg Edward, Hunters & Collectors

Hunters & Collectors chronology
Human Frailty (1986)	What's a Few Men? (1987)	Ghost Nation (1989)

Singles from What's a Few Men?
- 1. "Do You See What I See?" Released: 5 October 1987; 2. "Still Hangin' 'Round" Released: 1 February 1988; 3. "Back on the Breadline" Released: 20 June 1988

Fate
- 1988 US release (I.R.S. Records)

What's a Few Men? is the fifth studio album by Australian rock band Hunters & Collectors, which was released on 16 November 1987. The album's title was drawn from Albert Facey's memoir A Fortunate Life. The album peaked at No. 16 on the Australian Kent Music Report Albums Chart and No. 9 on the New Zealand Albums Chart. It provided the singles, "Do You See What I See", issued in October 1987 and "Still Hangin' Round", in February the following year. "Do You See What I See" reached No. 33 in Australia while in New Zealand it became their highest charting single at No. 13.

The band's label in the United States, I.R.S. Records, required the album to be renamed and a number of the songs to be replaced before they would issue it. What's a Few Men? was subsequently renamed Fate, with an altered track listing including four new songs, and was released in North America in September 1988. This version included the track, ""Back on the Breadline", which was issued as a single in the US and charted at No. 6 on the Billboard Modern Rock Tracks.

== Background ==
Hunters & Collectors toured the United States twice after their previous studio album, Human Frailty (April 1986). Their line up was John Archer on bass guitar, Doug Falconer on drums, Jack Howard on trumpet, Robert Miles on live sound, Mark Seymour on lead vocals and guitar, Jeremy Smith on French horn, and Michael Waters on keyboards and trombone. They released their third EP, Living Daylight, which was co-produced with Greg Edward, in Australia in April 1987. Australian musicologist Ian McFarlane felt it was "something of a stop-gap measure". The three-track EP appeared in the top 50 on the Australian Kent Music Report Singles Chart and reached No. 25 on the New Zealand Singles Chart.

It was followed by their fifth studio album, What's a Few Men?, also co-produced with Edward and released on 16 November 1987. Seymour provided the album's title from Albert Facey's memoir, A Fortunate Life. It relates a tale of a British officer complaining about the smell of rotting dead bodies on the battlefield at Gallipoli during World War I. When told that cleaning up the corpses would result in even more Australians getting shot down by the Ottoman Turks, the English Colonel's response was "What’s a few men?".

In September 1987 Seymour told Karen Middleton of The Canberra Times that "Australian musicians are using the political cutting edge a little too often. And it's getting blunt. And boring". Whereas Human Frailty was largely centred on his love-life, the new tracks "aren't really about me anymore ... I've got my personal life out of my system". The album peaked at No. 16 in Australia and No. 9 in New Zealand.

What's a Few Men? provided the singles, "Do You See What I See", released in October 1987 and "Still Hangin' Round", released February 1988. "Do You See What I See" peaked at No. 33 in Australia while in New Zealand it became their highest charting single at No. 13. "Still Hangin' Round" failed to chart in either territory and the band's US label, I.R.S. Records, deemed it to be too "Australian", as a result it was cut from the US configuration of the album, together with "Give Me a Reason". I.R.S. Records also insisted that the album be renamed, so it was retitled Fate, and released in September 1988. Three new tracks were recorded for the US CD version, including "Back on the Breadline", which was issued as a single in Australia in June and charted at No. 37 on the Australian Singles chart. I.R.S. released "Do You See What I See?" in August and "Back on the Breadline" in November, where it reached No. 6 on the Billboard Modern Rock Tracks.

In the liner notes for the compilation album, Natural Selection (October 2003), Seymour described "Back on the Breadline" and wrote "This song spearheaded the North American campaign of 1987. We were signed to I.R.S. Records, and What's a Few Men? would've been our second album with them. Unfortunately they couldn't hear a single. Stoically, we wrote more. 'Back on the Breadline' was one amongst several which went on a compile with the best of the rest from the What's a Few Men? album ... I could have sworn this song had 'hit' written all over it. How wrong can you be? Just before getting on the plane, standing at the terminal gate, waiting to fly home after I'd been to what felt like every radio station in North America promoting the track, the managing director of the record company asked me, in all seriousness, 'Hey young fella, can you tell me, exactly what is the breadline?'".

On 11 August 2003 Liberation Music issued a remastered release of What's a Few Men, which featured all 15 songs from the two versions.

== Reception ==
Professional ratings
Review scores
Source	Rating
Allmusic	4/5 stars

In September 1987 Karen Middleton of The Canberra Times noted that the group's "jaunts to the US have made an impact on Seymour's writing" and that the album "was one of variety, combining a handful of specific social songs and some more lighthearted numbers". Also that month her colleague, Stuart Coupe, compared Hunters & Collector's offering with other forthcoming Australian releases and found "to my mind the most astounding [one is theirs], which is undoubtedly [Seymour]'s finest collection of songs to date, and the best playing I've ever heard from the band". He rated it as better than Midnight Oil's Diesel and Dust (August 1987), Paul Kelly & The Coloured Girls' Under the Sun (December) or Richard Clapton's Glory Road (October).

Ira Robbins in Trouser Press felt the album "is accessible, has a nice clear, guitar-driven sound and its share of catchy hooks; nothing to alienate the casual listener." Chris Woodstra on AllMusic described it as "the finest moment of their later period, Fate is a cohesive and tightly produced album with an edge." Option magazine considered the album as being "filled with raw power, energy, and the belief that the world can be changed and that people do care." A review in Musician stated "Rough-hewn and raw-edged, there's nothing slick or commercially accommodating about Hunters & Collectors. Yet, beneath the band's brassy bluster there's a disarming, almost endearing sentimentality."

== Track listing ==
All lyrics are written by Mark Seymour; all music is composed by John Archer, Doug Falconer, Jack Howard, Robert Miles, Seymour, Jeremy Smith, Michael Waters; except where noted

No.	Title	Length
1.	"Faraway Man"	3:17
2.	"Do You See What I See?"	3:37
3.	"Around the Flame"	3:47
4.	"So Long Ago"	3:15
5.	"Breakneck Road"	2:42
6.	"What Are You Waiting For?"	2:24
7.	"Under the Sun"	5:03
8.	"Still Hangin' 'Round"	3:16
9.	"You Can Have It All"	4:04
10.	"What's a Few Men?"	3:08
11.	"Give Me a Reason"	3:39
Total length:		38:12

All lyrics are written by Seymour; all music is composed by Archer, Falconer, Howard, Miles, Seymour, Smith, Waters; except where noted

Original CD bonus tracks
No.	Title	Length
12.	"Inside a Fireball"	4:07
13.	"Living Daylight"	3:16
14.	"January Rain"	4:27
Total length:		50:02

All lyrics are written by Seymour; all music is composed by Archer, Falconer, Howard, Miles, Seymour, Smith, Waters; except where noted

2003 reissue/remaster bonus tracks
No.	Title	Length
12.	"Back on the Breadline"	3:14
13.	"Wishing Well"	4:05
14.	"Real World"	4:27
15.	"Something to Believe In"	3:50
Total length:		53:48

All lyrics are written by Seymour; all music is composed by Archer, Falconer, Howard, Miles, Seymour, Smith, Waters; except where noted

Track listing for US release as Fate
No.	Title	Length
1.	"Back on the Breadline"	4:02
2.	"Wishing Well"	4:12
3.	"You Can Have It All"	4:04
4.	"Do You See What I See?"	3:37
5.	"Around the Flame"	3:47
6.	"Faraway Man"	3:17
7.	"Under the Sun"	5:03
8.	"What Are You Waiting For?"	2:24
9.	"So Long Ago"	3:15
10.	"Real World"	4:03
11.	"Something to Believe In"	3:50
12.	"Breakneck Road"	2:42
13.	"What's a Few Men?"	3:08
Total length:		47:24

== Personnel ==
Credits

Hunters & Collectors members

- John Archer – bass guitar
- Doug Falconer – drums
- John 'Jack' Howard – trumpet
- Robert Miles – live sound, art director
- Mark Seymour – vocals, lead guitar
- Jeremy Smith – French horn
- Michael Waters – trombone, keyboards

=== Additional musicians ===
- Stephanie Blake – violin
- Jonathan Carter – violin
- Joe Creighton – backing vocals
- Lindsay Field – backing vocals
- John Lee – baritone saxophone, clarinet
- Alex Pertout – percussion
- Cindy Watkin – viola
- Chris Wilson – harmonica

Recording details

- Producer – Hunters & Collectors, Greg Edward
- Engineer – Greg Edward
  - Assistant engineer – Leanne Vallence
- Recording/mixing engineer – Robert Miles, Greg Edward
- Studio – Metropolis Audio, South Melbourne (recording, engineering, mixing)

Artworks

- Art director – Robert Miles (sleeve design)
- Photography – Peter Houghton

== Charts ==
Chart (1987/88)	Peak position
Australia (Kent Music Report)	16
Canada Top Albums/CDs (RPM)	90
New Zealand Albums Chart	9
