= Still Hanging 'Round =

Single by Hunters & Collectors

from the album What's a Few Men?
- Released: 1 February 1988
- Genre: Rock, pub rock
- Length: 3:17
- Label: White/Mushroom Records
- Songwriter(s): John Archer, Doug Falconer, Jack Howard, Robert Miles, Mark Seymour, Jeremy Smith, Michael Waters
- Producer(s): Hunters & Collectors, Greg Edward

Hunters & Collectors singles chronology
"Do You See What I See?" (1987)	"Still Hanging 'Round" (1988)	"Back on the Breadline" (1988)

"Still Hanging 'Round" is the fifteenth single by Australian pub rock band Hunters & Collectors, released on 1 February 1988. It was released as the second single from Hunters & Collectors' fifth studio album What's a Few Men?, which peaked at No. 48 on the Recorded Music NZ. The B-side, “John Riley”, is a remake of a traditional song, the original version is by B. Gibson and R. Neff. "Still Hanging 'Round" was covered by Cloud Control on the tribute album, Crucible – The Songs of Hunters & Collectors (September 2013).

== Track listing ==
7" version
No.	Title	Writer(s)	Length
1.	"Still Hanging 'Round"	Mark Seymour, John Archer, Doug Falconer, Robert Miles, Jeremy Smith, Michael Waters, John Howard	3:17
2.	"John Riley"	Traditional	3:25

== Reception ==
The Canberra Times' reviewer observed, "'Still Hanging 'Round' is not any different from anything else they have done none since they got bored with being boring. A song about a maudlin drunk, while not being anything new it is still enjoyable." While Phil of Tharunka felt, "[it] is one of the weaker tracks from the What's a Few Men? album, its view of love through the bottom of a beer glass still far exceeds ninety-five percent of the crap on radio."

== Personnel ==
- John Archer – bass guitar
- Doug Falconer – drums
- John 'Jack' Howard – trumpet
- Robert Miles – live sound, art director
- Mark Seymour – vocals, lead guitar
- Jeremy Smith – French horn
- Michael Waters – trombone, keyboards

Recording

- Producer – Hunters & Collectors, Greg Edward
- Engineer – Greg Edward
  - Assistant engineer – Leanne Vallence
- Recording/mixing engineer – Robert Miles, Greg Edward
- Studio – Metropolis Audio, South Melbourne (recording, engineering, mixing)

== Charts ==
Chart (1987)	Peak position
New Zealand Singles Chart	48
