= Undertow (Mark Seymour album) =

Studio album by Mark Seymour
- Released: 27 May 2011
- Recorded: Pony Studios, Hallam, Victoria, Sing Sing Studios, Richmond, Victoria
- Genre: Rock, pop
- Length: 44:06
- Label: Liberation Music
- Producer: Cameron McKenzie

Mark Seymour chronology
| Westgate (2007) | Undertow (2011) | Seventh Heaven Club (2013) |

Undertow is the seventh studio album by Australian musician Mark Seymour, and first credited to Mark Seymour and the Undertow. The album was released on 27 May 2011. It is the first post-Hunters & Collectors album by Seymour that is credited to a band.

== Track listing ==
(All songs by Mark Seymour except where indicated)

1. "Castlemaine" – 4:42
2. "Sometimes I Wonder if I Know Too Much About You" – 4:09
3. "Little Bridges" (Mark Seymour, Angie Hart) – 5:00
4. "Sylvia's in Black" – 5:18
5. "Legend of the Snowmen" – 2:40
6. "Eldorado" – 3:14
7. "Cry in the Rain" – 4:14
8. "Classrooms and Kitchens" – 4:10
9. "The Red Lady's Gone" – 2:57
10. "One More Ride" – 3:36
11. "The Patsy" (Seymour, The Undertow) – 4:06

== Personnel ==
- Mark Seymour – vocals, rhythm guitar
- Cameron McKenzie – guitars, keyboards, vocals
- John Favaro – bass, vocals
- Pete Maslen – drums, vocals
- Tony Floyd – drums ("Legend of the Snowmen")
- Angie Hart – vocals ("Little Bridges")
- Petra Salsjo – piano ("The Patsy")
- The Glenhuntly Tabernacle Choir – backing vocals ("One More Ride")

== Charts ==
Chart performance for Undertow
| Chart (2011) | Peak position |
|---|---|
| Australian Albums (ARIA) | 51 |
