= Do You See What I See? (song) =

Single by Hunters & Collectors

from the album What's a Few Men?
- Released: 1987
- Genre: Pub Rock
- Length: 3:37
- Label: White/Mushroom Records (AUS/NZ); I.R.S. (US)
- Songwriter(s): John Archer, Doug Falconer, Jack Howard, Robert Miles, Mark Seymour, Jeremy Smith, Michael Waters
- Producer(s): Greg Edward

Hunters & Collectors singles chronology
"Inside a Fireball" (1987)	"Do You See What I See?" (1987)	"Still Hanging 'Round" (1988)

"Do You See What I See?" is the fourteenth single by Australian pub rock band Hunters & Collectors, released in 1987. It was released ahead of the album in August 1987 in both 7" and 12" formats. It was released as the first single from Hunters & Collectors fifth album What's a Few Men?. "Do You See What I See?" peaked at number 33 on the ARIA Charts and at number 13 on the Recorded Music NZ.

== Track listing ==
7" version
No.	Title	Writer(s)	Length
1.	"Do You See What I See?"	Mark Seymour, John Archer, Doug Falconer, Robert Miles, Jeremy Smith, Michael Waters, John Howard	3:37
2.	"Give Me A Reason"	Mark Seymour, John Archer, Doug Falconer, Robert Miles, Jeremy Smith, Michael Waters, John Howard	3:39

All tracks are written by Mark Seymour, John Archer, Doug Falconer, Robert Miles, Jeremy Smith, Michael Waters, John Howard.

12" version
No.	Title	Length
1.	"Do You See What I See?" (extended mix)	5:20
2.	"What's A Few Men?"	3:35
3.	"Real World"

== Personnel ==
- John Archer – bass guitar
- Doug Falconer – drums
- John 'Jack' Howard – trumpet
- Robert Miles – live sound, art director
- Mark Seymour – vocals, lead guitar
- Jeremy Smith – French horn
- Michael Waters – trombone, keyboards

Recording details

- Producer – Hunters & Collectors, Greg Edward
- Engineer – Greg Edward
  - Assistant engineer – Leanne Vallence
- Recording/mixing engineer – Robert Miles, Greg Edward

== Charts ==
Chart (1987)	Peak position
Australia (Kent Music Report)	33
New Zealand Singles Chart	13
