= The Yearning (Things of Stone and Wood album) =

Studio album by Things of Stone and Wood
- Released: February 1993
- Studio: Platinum Studios, RBX Studios, Metropolis Audio
- Genre: Rock, pop
- Label: Columbia
- Producer: James Black, Martin Pullan

Things of Stone and Wood chronology
The Yearning (1993)	Junk Theatre (1995)

Singles from The Yearning
- 1. "Share This Wine" Released: September 1992; 2. "Happy Birthday Helen" Released: November 1992; 3. "Rock This Boat" Released: March 1993; 4. "Single Perfect Raindrop" Released: June 1993

The Yearning is the debut studio album by Australian folk-rock band Things of Stone and Wood. The album was released in February 1993 and peaked at number 8 on the ARIA Charts.

At the ARIA Music Awards of 1994, the album was nominated for Best Cover Art and Breakthrough Artist – Album.

== Reception ==
Professional ratings
Review scores
Source	Rating
AllMusic	4.5/5 stars

Jonathan Lewis from AllMusic said "The Yearning was a gem, full of the band's trademark bittersweet folk-pop, with an unmistakably Australian feel." adding "Much of Things of Stone and Wood's music dealt in familiar Australian images... from the Yarra River to songs about suburban Melbourne and the Housing Commission flats that dominate sections of the city's skyline. Things of Stone and Wood are also one of only a few Australian bands who deal in the sort of social commentary more usually associated with Midnight Oil, from the rise of racism in Australia to the slow destruction of the Australian Aboriginal culture, and inner-city decay. The Yearning was a superb debut from Things of Stone and Wood, mixing thoughtful lyrics with brilliant pop melodies."

== Track listing ==
No.	Title	Writer(s)	Length
1.	"Share This Wine"	Greg Arnold	4:01
2.	"Heidelberg"	Arnold	3:47
3.	"Happy Birthday Helen"	Arnold	3:11
4.	"Rock This Boat"	Michael Allen; Arnold	3:38
5.	"Wrapped"	Arnold	4:14
6.	"Beg"	Arnold	4:25
7.	"The Yearning"	Arnold	2:09
8.	"Single Perfect Raindrop"	Arnold	4:07
9.	"Rain Fell Down"	Arnold	4:24
10.	"Barkly Street"	Allen; Arnold; Tony Floyd	3:43
11.	"In Our Home"	Arnold	3:53
12.	"They Won't Know Why"	Arnold	3:57
13.	"Is This Where I Must Lie"	Arnold	4:12
14.	"Charlie Scanlon"	Justin Brady	1:56

== Charts ==
Chart (1993)	Peak position
Australian Albums (ARIA)	8

== Certifications ==
Region	Certification	Certified units/sales
Australia (ARIA)	Gold	35,000^{^}
^{^} Shipments figures based on certification alone.

== Release history ==
Region	Date	Format(s)	Label	Catalogue
Australia	February 1993	Compact Disc, cassette	Columbia	473586
