= Things of Stone and Wood =

Australian band

- Also known as: ToSaW
- Origin: Melbourne, Victoria, Australia
- Genres: Folk, rock, indie rock, folk rock
- Years active: 1989–1998, 2001–2006, 2013–present
- Labels: Sony, Things, Shock, Barking Mad
- Members: Michael Allen; Greg Arnold; Tony Floyd
- Past members: John Bedggood; Richard Tankard; Justin Brady; James Black

Things of Stone and Wood or ToSaW are an Australian folk rock band which formed in 1989. The original line-up was Michael Bruce Allen on bass guitar and backing vocals; Greg Arnold on lead vocals and acoustic guitar; Justin Brady on violin, mandolin and harmonica; and Tony Floyd on drums and percussion. Two of their albums, The Yearning (February 1993) and Junk Theatre (March 1995) peaked at No. 8 on the ARIA Albums Chart. Their 1992 single, "Happy Birthday Helen", which reached No. 9 on the ARIA Singles Chart, was written by Arnold for his then-girlfriend, whom he later married. At the ARIA Music Awards of 1993 the group won ARIA Award for Best New Talent for "Share This Wine". Arnold won Songwriter of the Year at the 1993 APRA Awards.

"Happy Birthday Helen" was listed at No. 91 on the Triple J Hottest 100 in 1993. The group disbanded in 1998, reformed in 2001 and broke up again in 2006. In 2013 the original lineup reunited and in 2014 they embarked on a 25th Anniversary tour. In March 2026 they released a new album, Rae Street, and toured Australia to launch it.

== History ==
=== 1989–1994: Formation and The Yearning ===
Things of Stone and Wood formed in Melbourne in 1989 with Michael Allen on bass guitar and backing vocals; Greg Arnold on lead vocals and acoustic guitar; Justin Brady on violin, mandolin and harmonica; and Tony Floyd on drums and percussion. Both Allen and Arnold were former members of Thirteen at Midnight, an indie rock group. That band had formed in 1986 and included Russell Hall on bass guitar and Byron Smith on guitar, they had issued a single, "She Sells Sanctuary" (1986), and an album, Warring Tribes (1988) on Cleopatra Records.

One of Things of Stone and Wood's earliest gigs was at the 21st birthday party for Helen Durham – Arnold's then-girlfriend. The group took up long term residencies in Melbourne and followed with interstate touring on the pub and club circuit. In September 1991 they issued their debut single, "The Hopeful", on Things Records, which was produced by James Black (Greg Champion). Black was also their manager and had been a guitarist or keyboardist in Russell Morris Band, Mondo Rock and The Revelators. In 1992 the band had signed with Sony and recorded their debut album, The Yearning. In September 1992, the album's lead single "Share this Wine" was released which reached the ARIA Singles Chart top 50. The album's second single, "Happy Birthday Helen", was released in November and reached No. 9. Arnold, who later married Durham, had written the track for her 22nd birthday:

[it] was just a gift for Helen ... it was never intended to be released. But when I played it to Mikey he said, "This is a ripper, we've got to do this song" ... The drive along the Yarra is all true ... We kissed on the bridge that fell down ... was actually London Bridge on the Great Ocean Road ... It was such an intensely personal love song, so it was weird hearing the song everywhere.

— Greg Arnold quoted in Molly Meldrum presents 50 years of rock in Australia (2007) by Jeff Jenkins and Ian "Molly" Meldrum, p. 288–289.

"Happy Birthday Helen" was parodied on Australian Broadcasting Corporation's TV series, The Late Show, in 1992 as "We've Just Run Out of Melbourne Cliches". Arnold heard in advance that it was due to appear, "I got worried, but it was all quite flattering. Their video is hilarious". "Happy Birthday Helen" was listed at No. 91 on the Triple J Hottest 100 in 1993. The Yearning was released in February 1993 and peaked at No. 8 on the ARIA Albums Chart.

At the ARIA Music Awards of 1993 Things of Stone and Wood won 'Best New Talent' for "Share this Wine". During 1993 they supported national tours by Australian artists Midnight Oil, Paul Kelly, and by Irish folk-rocker, Luka Bloom. Late that year they toured Europe. Arnold won 'Songwriter of the Year' at the 1993 APRA Awards.

At the ARIA Music Awards of 1994 The Yearning was nominated for 'Breakthrough Artist – Album' and 'Best Cover Art' (for Marcelle Lunam's artwork). The Yearning received critical acclaim from AllMusic's Jonathan Lewis, "shown a strong social conscience in their lyrics; in particular, they condemned the apparent rise of racism in Australia". It was accredited with a gold certificate.

=== 1995–2000: Junk Theatre and break-up ===
Their follow-up album, Junk Theatre, released in March 1995 was also produced by Black. It peaked at No. 8 but dropped out of the top 50 after four weeks. Australian rock music historian, Ian McFarlane felt it "highlighted the band's eternal capacity for adventurous folk-pop arrangements, mellifluous melodies and Arnold's astute and sometimes acrid lyrical observations". Its lead single, "Wildflowers" was released in August 1994, which reached the top 50, and was the most played Australian single on radio during October. The next single, "Churchill's Black Dog", was released in February 1995 and reached the top 40. At the end of that year the band left Sony.

Their third album, The Man with the Perfect Hair, appeared in November 1995 on their own independent label, Things Records and was co-produced by Black and the group. The title is a reference to The 7.30 Report's host, Kerry O'Brien. McFarlane noted it was "[a]imed at the dedicated ToSaW fan, [which] comprised a pleasantly relaxed, single-take, 'unplugged' session that featured new songs, reworked B-sides and a dodgy Beatles cover, 'I've Just Seen a Face'". Their musical style followed a Beatle-esque path, Brady left and the group became a three-piece. In October 1996 the group's fourth album, Whirligig, was released, which was co-produced by Things of Stone and Wood, Black and Simon Holmes (The Fauves). McFarlane described it as "another batch of joyful folk-pop such as the Beatlesque 'Blink'". After a tour in late 1998 the band went on a hiatus as individual members pursued other projects. Allen had already issued his debut solo album, Aeroplane (June), and followed with his second, Softness Isn’t Admired Enough (August 1999). In 1999 Arnold formed a new band, Tricycle, with Anita Hustas on double bass and Ian Kitney on drums, which issued their debut album, Super (September).

=== 2001–2014: Reformation and compilations ===
Things of Stone & Wood reformed in 2001 and released a compilation album So Far: Best of Things of Stone & Wood 1992-2002 in 2002, which featured a new single "Ship of the Damned". The lineup of Allen, Arnold and Floyd were joined by Richard Tankard on keyboard. A new studio album, Rollercoaster, was released in 2003. Arnold wrote most of the songs for the group. By 2006 the group had disbanded again – except irregular 'one-off' performance reunions.

Arnold released his solo album Lost Marie in 2007. He is a music lecturer at Northern Melbourne Institute of TAFE, and worked as a producer recording work by Junior, Chloe Hall, Carus & the True Believers, Georgia Fields, Stonefield and Skipping Girl Vinegar.

In May 2014 they toured Australia playing dates in Brisbane, Adelaide, Sydney, Melbourne and Hobart. In June, Arnold and his wife Helen relocated to Europe. ToSaW continue as a side project when Greg is in Australia.

=== 2026: Rae Street ===
In February 2026, the group released the double-A sided single "You'd Gone Before You Went"/"The Windmills Turn" and announced Rae Street, their first album in 20 years, released on 13 March 2026. The band toured Australia to showcase the album. Arnold and Allen played intimate acoustic shows in the eastern states, with Floyd joining them on drums for the final few concerts, beginning at the Wheatsheaf Hotel in Adelaide on 21 May 2026. A companion album, The Final Forest, is due for release in November 2026.

== Members ==
- Michael Bruce Allen – bass guitar, keyboards, guitar, vocals (1989–1998, 2001–2006, 2013–present)
- Greg Arnold – vocals, guitar, keyboards (1989–1998, 2001–2006, 2013–present)
- Tony Floyd – drums, percussion, recorder, vocals (1989–1998, 2001–2006, 2013–present)
- Justin Brady – harmonica, violin, mandolin, guitar (1989–1995, 1997–1998, 2013–2015)
- John Bedggood –violin, mandolin (2001–2002)
- Richard Tankard – Hammond organ (2001–2006)

== Discography ==
=== Studio albums ===
List of studio albums, with selected chart positions
Title	Album details	Peak chart positions	Certification
Title	Album details	AUS	Certification
The Yearning	Released: February 1993; Label: Columbia (473586); Format: CD, cassette	8	ARIA: Gold
Junk Theatre	Released: March 1995; Label: Columbia (478346); Format: CD, cassette	8	
The Man with the Perfect Hair	Released: November 1995; Label: Shock (things 003); Format: CD	167	
Whirligig	Released: September 1996; Label: Shock (things 005); Format: CD	136	
Rollercoaster	Released: 2003; Label: Mixmasters (MXR003); Format: CD	—	
Rae Street	Released: 13 March 2026; Label: MGM (TOSAW6); Format: CD, digital download	80	
The Final Forest	Released: 30 October 2026; Label: MGM; Format: digital download	TBA	

=== Live albums ===
List of live albums, with selected details
Title	Album details
Live at the Espy	Released: October 1996; Label: Shock (things 006); Format: CD; NB: Limited edition of 1000 numbered and autographed copies

=== Compilation albums ===
List of compilation albums, with selected details
Title	Album details
So Far: Best of Things of Stone & Wood 1992–2002	Released: 2002; Label: Barking Mad/ Universal Music Australia (BM0002); Format: CD
The Essential	Released: June 2014; Label: Sony Music Australia (88843077562); Format: CD, digital download

=== Singles ===
Year	Title	Peak chart positions	Album
Year	Title	AUS	Album
1991	"The Hopeful"	—	non-album single
1992	"Share This Wine"	46	The Yearning
1992	"Happy Birthday Helen"	9	The Yearning
1993	"Rock This Boat"	51	The Yearning
1993	"Single Perfect Raindrop"	50	The Yearning
1994	"Wildflowers"	41	Junk Theatre
1995	"Churchill's Black Dog"	34	Junk Theatre
1995	"Hello Crazy Shadow"	—	Junk Theatre
1996	"Blink"	—	Whirligig
2002	"Ship of the Damned"	—	So Far: Best of Things of Stone & Wood 1992–2002
2003	"Angeline Forgive Me/Foldaway Heart"	—	Rollercoaster
2026	"You'd Gone Before You Left"/ "The Windmills Turn"	—	Rae Street
2026	"Fade Away"	—	Rae Street
2026	"The Final Forest"	—	The Final Forest
"—" denotes a recording that did not chart or was not released in that territory.

== Awards and nominations ==
=== APRA Awards ===
The APRA Awards are held in Australia and New Zealand by the Australasian Performing Right Association to recognise songwriting skills, sales and airplay performance by its members annually.

Year	Nominee / work	Award	Result
1993	Greg Arnold	Songwriter of the Year	Won
1993	"Happy Birthday Helen" (Greg Arnold) by Things of Stone and Wood	Song of the Year	Nominated

=== ARIA Music Awards ===
The ARIA Music Awards is an annual awards ceremony that recognises excellence, innovation, and achievement across all genres of Australian music. They commenced in 1987.

Year	Nominee / work	Award	Result	Ref.
1993	"Share This Wine"	Best New Talent	Won	
1993	"Share This Wine"	Breakthrough Artist – Single	Nominated	
1994	The Yearning	Breakthrough Artist – Album	Nominated	
1994	Marcelle Lunam for Things of Stone and Wood The Yearning	Best Cover Art	Nominated	
1994	James Black for Things of Stone and Wood "Rock This Boat", "Single Perfect Raindrop", "Heidelberg" and "Barkley Street"	Producer of the Year	Nominated	
1994	"Happy Birthday Helen"	Highest Selling Single	Nominated	
