= Junk Theatre =

Studio album by Things of Stone and Wood
- Released: March 1995
- Genre: Rock, pop
- Label: Columbia

Things of Stone and Wood chronology
The Yearning (1993)	Junk Theatre (1995)	The Man with the Perfect Hair (1995)

Singles from Junk Theatre
- 1. "Wildflowers" Released: August 1994; 2. "Churchill's Black Dog" Released: February 1995; 3. "Hello Crazy Shadow" Released: 1995

Junk Theatre is the second studio album by Australian folk-rock band Things of Stone and Wood. The album was released in March 1995 and debuted and peaked at number 8 on the ARIA Charts.

== Reception ==
Professional ratings
Review scores
Source	Rating
AllMusic	4/5 stars

Jonathan Lewis from AllMusic said "While similar in many ways to their debut The Yearning, this album had a harder musical edge, often more rock than folk... Again, social commentary was Things of Stone and Wood's main source of inspiration, although on Junk Theatre there were much fewer specific Australian references. Everything from racism to the negative effects of television are touched upon."

== Track listing ==
No.	Title	Writer(s)	Length
1.	"Junk Theatre"	Michael Allen; Greg Arnold; Anthony Floyd	4:00
2.	"Churchill's Black Dog"	Arnold	3:14
3.	"Child No More"	Arnold	3:19
4.	"Wildflowers"	Arnold	3:40
5.	"Fingertips"	Arnold	3:15
6.	"Wild Man Shouting"	Allen; Arnold	5:14
7.	"Hello Crazy Shadow"	Arnold	4:35
8.	"Little Voices"	Allen; Arnold; Justin Brady; Floyd	1:48
9.	"Silent No Longer"	Franz Grüber; Joseph Mohr	3:12
10.	"Cruel Man Power"	Arnold	3:43
11.	"In This Thing Together"	Arnold	3:05
12.	"Lullaby"	Arnold	6:26

== Charts ==
Chart (1995)	Peak position
Australian Albums (ARIA)	8

== Release history ==
Region	Date	Format(s)	Label	Catalogue
Australia	March 1995	Compact Disc	Columbia	478346
