= Last Ditch Cabaret =

Single by Mark Seymour

from the album King Without a Clue
- Released: May 1997
- Length: 4:08
- Label: Mushroom
- Songwriter(s): Mark Seymour
- Producer(s): Barry Palmer

Mark Seymour singles chronology
"Hey Boys" (1992)	"Last Ditch Cabaret" (1997)	"The Ghost of Vainglory" (1997)

"Last Ditch Cabaret" is a song written and performed by Australian singer-songwriter, Mark Seymour. The song was released in May 1997 as the lead single from his debut studio album, King Without a Clue. The song peaked at number 85 on the ARIA singles chart.

At the ARIA Music Awards of 1997, the song was nominated for two awards; Best Male Artist and Breakthrough Artist – Single.

== Track listing ==
CD single

1. "Last Ditch Cabaret" – 4:08
2. "Until They Die" – 4:11
3. "The Ghost of Vainglory" (live acoustic version) – 4:13
4. "The Patriot Game" (live acoustic version) – 4:13
5. "Last Ditch Cabaret" (live acoustic version) – 4:27

== Charts ==
Chart performance for "Last Ditch Cabaret"
Chart (1997)	Peak position
Australia (ARIA)	85

== Release history ==
Release history and formats for "Last Ditch Cabaret"
Country	Date	Format	Label	Catalogue
Australia	May 1997	CD	Mushroom	MUSH01609.2
