= RedR =

International NGO

- Founded: 1980 by Peter Guthrie in Britain
- Type: Non-profit; NGO
- Location: Global
- Services: Humanitarian training, recruitment and deployment of technical professionals for the humanitarian sector, technical support
- Website: RedR UK Redr Australia

RedR (pronounced 'Red R') is an international humanitarian capacity-strengthening NGO founded in the United Kingdom in 1980. Originally established as the Register of Engineers for Disaster Relief, it now provides learning and development, technical assistance, and knowledge-sharing services for humanitarian, development and disaster-response professionals.

Its work focuses on humanitarian services, engineering in emergencies, and climate-related disaster risk, with an emphasis on strengthening the capacity of local and national responders.

In 2023, the Financial Times recognised RedR as one of 20 organisations helping to rebuild broken worlds.

== History ==
=== 1980s ===
RedR was founded in London in 1980 by engineer Peter Guthrie following time spent delivering aid during the crisis of the Vietnamese boat people. Mr. Guthrie said: “When I returned [from the refugee crisis in Malaysia] I saw the pressing need for engineers to help in this sort of work and compiled a register of engineers who could be called upon at short notice to work with frontline relief agencies.”

On the advice of Oxfam’s chief engineer Jim Howard, Oxfam provided seed funding and RedR was formally registered as a charity.

In 1985, RedR faced its first major challenge with the onset of the Ethiopian Famine. A significant number of RedR Members were required to work on relief programmes in Ethiopia and neighbouring Sudan. In 1988, The Princess Royal became President of RedR, a position she still holds today.

=== 1990s ===
In 1991, RedR UK’s training programme began.

In 1992, RedR Australia was founded. It commenced with a register of engineers and soon after began delivering training for humanitarian workers.

In 1994, the Rwanda crisis erupted and over 100 RedR Members were deployed to the Great Lakes region, while RedR New Zealand was established. A year later, the first ever edition of ‘Engineering in Emergencies: A Practical Guide for Relief Workers’ by RedR Members Jan Davis and Robert Lambert was published.

In 1998, RedR launched its Technical Support Service for relief workers in the field and the following year their first regional training – Security Management - in Tirana, Albania.

=== 2000s ===
In 2003, RedR UK merged with International Health Exchange (IHE), an organisation that improved the preparation and recruitment of health professionals for overseas emergency situations. RedR set up a programme office for the first time in East Africa.

In 2005, in response to the 2004 Indian Ocean earthquake and tsunami, RedR launched a ‘Learning Support and Capacity Building Programme’ in Sri Lanka and commenced a similar programme in Pakistan following the 2005 earthquake. In the same year, RedR established a programme in Darfur, Sudan, in response to the country's civil war and trained 4,000 national and international aid workers over the next five years.

RedR UK and RedR Australia became involved in the UN Cluster approach in 2006. RedR leads the training of aid workers within a number of cluster groups, including WASH (Water, Sanitation and Hygiene), Emergency Shelter, Health and Nutrition.

In 2009, RedR UK linked with Oxford Brookes University to offer credit-rated courses in six of its training courses.

Following the 2010 Haiti earthquake, RedR established a programme and trained 1,000 relief workers to support the response. 91% of trainees were Haitian nationals. RedR Lanka was also established in its own right to help assist in long term capacity building in Sri Lanka.

In 2011, RedR UK set up a country programme in South Sudan to assist with ongoing insecurity in the region.

Starting late 2014, RedR UK provided training for UK NHS staff being deployed to Sierra Leone to respond to the Ebola Crisis in that country.

== Current Work ==
=== Humanitarian Capacity Strengthening ===
Though RedR started as a register of engineers for disaster relief, for over 45 years it has also delivered training across the globe for the humanitarian sector and their staff.

RedR provides learning and development, technical assistance, and convening services for humanitarian and disaster-response professionals. Its current thematic areas include humanitarian services, engineering in emergencies, and climate change.

==== Humanitarian learning and development ====
RedR’s learning services include online, face-to-face, self-paced and blended training, as well as simulations, coaching, mentoring, microgrants, technical reviews and framework development.

==== Technical assistance ====
RedR also provides technical reviews, framework development and method guidance, bringing together humanitarian and engineering expertise. Its approach emphasises localisation, including learning needs assessments, peer exchange, contextualised training and the involvement of local expertise in programme design and delivery.

==== Convening and knowledge-sharing ====
RedR brings together practitioners, trainers and technical experts through research, articles and events.

==== Standards, accreditation, and professionalisation ====
RedR has contributed to humanitarian learning standards and professionalisation. RedR was a founding member of HPass and one of the first organisations to become HPass certified. RedR also contributed to the drafting of the International Development and Humanitarian Training Competency Framework.

== The RedR Federation ==
The RedR Federation comprises several nationally accredited RedR organisations who all share a common vision and mission. These include RedR organisations in Australia, Indonesia, India, Malaysia, and UK.

=== RedR UK ===
RedR UK delivers a range of learning services for aid workers. In 2024–25, RedR reported that it equipped 2,698 frontline responders across 72 nationalities with practical skills for crisis response. Its reported work included support to Sudanese organisations responding to displacement, Ukrainian engineers working to maintain essential services, and climate practitioners in Afghanistan and Somalia working on locally led resilience to drought and flooding.

In Sudan, RedR developed contextualised training materials following a Learning Needs Assessment and delivered 28 online facilitated training modules in Arabic to 555 responders to the Sudan humanitarian crisis. It also delivered a Training of Trainers in Humanitarian Emergencies course in Arabic for 33 selected participants.

Following Russia’s full-scale invasion of Ukraine, RedR reported that it designed and delivered 27 training sessions for 360 humanitarian responders within two months, and later trained more than 6,000 Ukrainians. The training covered humanitarian principles, blast-induced damage assessment, repair methods and retrofitting technologies.

The President of RedR UK is Princess Anne, the Princess Royal.

=== RedR Australia ===
RedR Australia was founded in 1992 by engineer Jeff Dobel. Its founding bodies were Engineers Australia, Consult Australia, Professionals Australia, and the Institute of Public Works Engineering Australasia (IPWEA).

RedR Australia selects, trains and deploys humanitarian experts to support humanitarian crises around the world. It maintains a roster of more than 1000 senior humanitarians and 80 humanitarian trainers, and every year it trains and deploys hundreds of humanitarians across a wide range of skill profiles. In FY23, these humanitarians worked in 40 countries across the world.

RedR Australia is the implementing partner for the Australia Assists Program, the Australian Government's humanitarian civilian deployment program, which is run by the Department of Foreign Affairs and Trade (DFAT). The Australia Assists Program deploys technical specialists to help communities prepare for, respond to and recover from natural hazards and conflict. In FY23, the program deployed 116 senior humanitarians to 37 countries around the world to address a wide range of humanitarian needs. The program was established in 2017.

RedR Australia also delivers a range of humanitarian training courses, including Essentials of Humanitarian Practice (EHP), Hostile Environment Awareness Training (HEAT), Humanitarian Logistics in Emergencies (HLE), Water and Sanitation in Emergencies (WASH), Child Protection in Humanitarian Action (CPHA), as well as bespoke courses for professional aid workers. RedR Australia maintains educational partnerships with the University of New South Wales, Western Sydney University and RMIT University. RedR Australia's training courses are highly regarded and in FY23 they received an average participant satisfaction rating of 92%.

RedR Australia is a Standby Partner to 16 United Nations agencies, including the United Nations High Commissioner for Refugees (UNHCR), United Nations Children's Fund (UNICEF), World Health Organization (WHO), World Food Programme (WFP) and UN Women. These partnerships allow RedR Australia to deploy their roster members to work with these UN agencies following the onset of humanitarian crises and in complex emergencies.

RedR Australia also maintains a wide array of partnerships with governments, including the Australian Government's Department of Foreign Affairs and Trade and the UK Government's Foreign, Commonwealth and Development Office; international NGOs such as FHI 360 and Habitat for Humanity; civil society organisations such as Pacific Community (SPC), ASEAN, Rotary and Fiji Council of Social Services; and the corporate sector, including Arup and GHD.

RedR Australia is a leader in gender equality in the humanitarian sector. In FY23, 50 per cent of RedR Australia's UN deployees identified as female. It is currently the only UN Standby Partner to achieve a parity between male and female deployees.

RedR Australia is also committed to cultural diversity, with 82 nationalities represented by roster members in FY23.

RedR Australia maintains offices in Melbourne, Australia; Suva, Fiji; and Amman, Jordan.

In July 2023, humanitarian lawyer Dr Helen Durham AO became RedR Australia's CEO. Previously, Durham was the Director of International Law and Policy at the International Committee of the Red Cross (ICRC) in Geneva, Switzerland. Prior to Durham, Kirsten Sayers served as CEO of RedR Australia and stepped down in early 2023.

In September 2023, RedR Australia launched a podcast called Humanitarian Conversations in which experienced humanitarians discuss "what it means to be a humanitarian in today’s world". Interviewees include Dr Helen Durham, Peter Grzic, Mel Bencik and Katherine Harries. The podcast is hosted by Sally Cunningham.

=== Past Country Programmes ===
RedR has had country programmes in Sudan, South Sudan, Kenya and Pakistan. These programmes responded to the ongoing humanitarian crises in these regions and the needs of the various humanitarian organisations operating there.

==== Pakistan ====
RedR established a programme in Islamabad in 2010 to support the humanitarian community within the country following the ongoing internal conflict in the North-West of the country. This follows a previous programme set up in response to the 2005 earthquake, which ran until June 2006. Although the office closed in 2017, RedR UK has continued to work in Pakistan, including a learning programme for volunteers in response to the 2022 flooding.

==== Sudan ====
RedR established its Sudan Programme in 2005, specialising in safety and security training for aid workers due to the ongoing conflict in Darfur. As well as security training, RedR delivered a range of courses aimed at improving the capacity of both local and international aid agencies until the office closed in 2020.

==== South Sudan ====
RedR operated in South Sudan July 2011 to February 2014 in preparation for the country's separation from Sudan, with a training programme based in the capital Juba.

==== Kenya ====
RedR opened its humanitarian training centre in Nairobi, Kenya in September 2011. This was in response to the Horn of Africa Food Crisis in the summer of 2011. Funds for the project were raised partly through RedR's East Africa Appeal.

== Recruitment Service ==
RedR has provided recruitment services for aid agencies, governments and private sector companies responding to major disasters through its Member's register, which currently has a pool of about 1,700 specialists. RedR's recruitment register focuses on all areas of the humanitarian sector, but specialises in engineering, health, logistics, security, and management consultants.

- Following the 2004 Indian Ocean earthquake and tsunami, RedR provided 79 people within the first three months.
- Following the 2005 Kashmir earthquake, RedR provided 80 people within the first three months.
- Following Cyclone Nargis, Myanmar 2008, 140 RedR members were waiting to be deployed as and when they were needed.

== Vision, Mission and Values ==
RedR states its vision is a ‘world in which sufficient competent and committed personnel are available and responding to humanitarian needs.’

RedR believes in the provision of humanitarian assistance to people wherever it is needed to relieve suffering and sickness.

A key idea they integrate when responding to disasters is that people and communities affected by disasters themselves should be empowered to develop skills for immediate and future disaster response.

== RedR Federation Members ==
- RedR UK (1980)
- RedR Australia (1992)
- RedR India (2003)
- RedR Malaysia (2005)
- RedR Indonesia (2007)
