= Seventh Heaven Club =

Studio album by Mark Seymour & The Undertow
- Released: 1 March 2013
- Recorded: Pony Studios, Hallam, Victoria, Station Place, Glen Huntly
- Genre: Rock, pop
- Length: 48:24
- Label: Liberation Music
- Producer: Cameron McKenzie

Mark Seymour & The Undertow chronology
Undertow (2011)	Seventh Heaven Club (2013)	Mayday (2015)

Professional ratings
Review scores
Source	Rating
Sunday Herald Sun	3.5/5 stars
The Courier-Mail	3.5/5 stars

Seventh Heaven Club is the second album by Mark Seymour and the Undertow, which was released in March 2013. The album is a collection of covers of love songs by artists including Bob Dylan, Neil Young, Jackson Browne, Dave Dobbyn and Otis Redding. It also includes a duet with Lucinda Williams on a version of her 2007 song, "Come On".

Seymour said the album had its genesis while he was "courting his wife" in New Zealand with the music of Tom Petty and Dave Dobbyn in the background. He formed the idea of a concept album of love songs, eventually dismissing a thought of including two of his own songs.

He said: "It begins with "Lorelei" because it's about the mythology of love and each song is moving further into the complexity of sexual intimacy. It ends with Redding—he's like, give it to me—all my intentions are completely single. They're the bookends. In between the other songs are tough stuff."

He said he had been performing "Lorelei" for years. He explained: "I knew I was going to record it and I heard (daughter) Hannah singing in her room one day and it was obvious she should sing it. The woman's voice in that song is a ghost. She's a mythological character. She is the voice of Lorelei inside someone's head. Hannah also has the quality of that pure Celtic tone. She's the right person for it."

Seymour said he performed the duet with Williams "by mail". "We sent the multi-track across to her. She said she wanted to do it and recorded three versions and sent them back. I love the angst in that song. It's brutal, aggressive and full of irony. It's not really a lyric built for duets, but the idea of the two voices having opposite spins on the same song appealed to me."

== Track listing ==
1. "Lorelei" (Phil Chevron) (originally recorded by The Pogues) – 3:36
2. "Getting Over You" (Stephen Bruton) – 3:58
3. "Can't Wait" (Mark Seymour, Angie Hart) (Bob Dylan) (originally recorded by Bob Dylan) – 5:14
4. "Sorrow" (Matt Berninger & Aaron Dessner) (originally recorded by The National) – 3:37
5. "Beside You" (Dave Dobbyn) (originally recorded by Dave Dobbyn) – 3:38
6. "Caroline" (Johnette Napolitano) (originally recorded by Concrete Blonde) – 5:06
7. "Late For the Sky" (Jackson Browne) (originally recorded by Jackson Browne) – 5:01
8. "Counting On You" (Tom Petty) (originally recorded by Tom Petty) – 3:49
9. "Come On" (with Lucinda Williams) (Lucinda Williams) (originally recorded by Lucinda Williams) – 3:44
10. "Only Love Can Break Your Heart" (Neil Young) (originally recorded by Neil Young) – 3:28
11. "It Makes No Difference" (Robbie Robertson) (originally recorded by The Band) – 4:06
12. "These Arms of Mine" (Otis Redding) (originally recorded by Otis Redding) – 2:57

== Personnel ==
- Mark Seymour — vocals, rhythm guitar
- Cameron McKenzie — guitars, vocals
- John Favaro — bass, vocals
- Pete Maslen — drums, vocals
- Hannah Seymour – vocals on "Lorelei"
- Abby Dobson – vocals on "Getting Over You"
- Jake Mason – keyboards
- Carnegie Tabernal Choir: John Flynn, Sarah Gurry, Abby Dobson, Craig Johnston, Mal Pinkerton, Michal Allen, Sam Boyden, Diana Glenn – backing vocals

== Charts ==
Chart performance for Seventh Heaven Club
Chart (2013)	Peak position
Australian Albums (ARIA)	116
