= Daytime and the Dark =

Studio album by Mark Seymour
- Released: March 2005
- Recorded: October 2004 – November 2004
- Genre: Rock, pop
- Length: 54:24
- Label: Liberation Blue
- Producer: Cameron McKenzie

Mark Seymour chronology
Embedded (2004)	Daytime and the Dark (2005)	Westgate (2007)

Daytime and the Dark is the fourth studio album by Australian musician, Mark Seymour. It contained acoustic versions of songs, most of which had appeared first on albums by Seymour's band Hunters & Collectors, and was released in March 2005. It also contained two new songs, "Good Ol' Boys" and "Dream You Had Last Night", as well as a cover version of Dragon's 1977 hit "April Sun in Cuba" as a duet with James Reyne. The album peaked at number 99 on the ARIA Charts.

The album was re-released in June 2012 under the title Greatest Hits Acoustic.

== Track listing ==
Daytime and the Dark track listing
No.	Title	Writer(s)	Length
1.	"Do You See What I See?"		3:11
2.	"Head Above Water"		2:46
3.	"Ready to Go"	Mark Seymour	3:53
4.	"Tears of Joy"		3:06
5.	"Radio Death Song"	Seymour	3:06
6.	"When the River Runs Dry"		3:57
7.	"What's a Few Men"		3:59
8.	"Holy Grail"		3:27
9.	"See You Around Sometime"	Daryl Braithwaite, Seymour	3:52
10.	"You Stole My Thunder"		3:21
11.	"The Slab"		2:50
12.	"Throw Your Arms Around Me"		3:53
13.	"In the Kitchen of a Perfect Home"	David McCormack, Seymour	3:30
14.	"Good Old Boys Stuff"		3:18
15.	"The Dream You Had Last Night"	Hillary Seymour, Seymour	3:00
16.	"April Sun in Cuba" (with James Reyne)	Marc Hunter, Paul Hewson	3:35

== Personnel ==
- Mark Seymour – guitars, vocals
- Cameron McGlinchie – drums
- Tony Floyd – percussion
- Cameron McKenzie – guitars, percussion
- Louise McCarthy – vocals
- James Black – keyboards
- Andrew Carswell – tin whistle

== Charts ==
Chart performance for Daytime and the Dark
Chart (2005)	Peak position
Australian Albums (ARIA)	99

== Release history ==
Release history and formats for Daytime and the Dark
Country	Date	Format	Label	Catalogue
Australia	March 2005	CD	Liberation Blue	BLUE075.5
Various	June 2012	CD, download	Liberation Music	LMCD0181
