= One Eyed Man =

Studio album by Mark Seymour
- Released: March 2001
- Studio: Sing Sing Studios
- Genre: Rock, pop
- Length: 50:27
- Label: Mushroom
- Producer: Daniel Denholm, David Nicholas

Mark Seymour chronology
King Without a Clue (1997)	One Eyed Man (2001)	Embedded (2004)

Singles from One Eyed Man
- 1. "Do You Know Me?" Released: 2001; 2. "The Ballad of the One Eyed Man" Released: 2001

One Eyed Man is the second studio album by Australian musician Mark Seymour. The album was released in March 2001 and peaked at number 67 on the ARIA Charts. Seymour said the album's title was inspired by an incident during a 1998 Hunters and Collectors tour when he was mugged in Sydney's Kings Cross nightclub precinct by a group led by a man with one eye. He said the album marked a break from the "Hunters hangover" evident on his solo debut, King Without a Clue.

At the ARIA Music Awards of 2001, the album won the award for Best Adult Contemporary Album.

== Reception ==
The album received positive reviews, with some noting similarities with the sound of Crowded House. A profile of Seymour in the Sydney Morning Herald also observed a Crowded House connection, claiming the album contained "the poppiest songs he's written", while Iain Sheddon in The Australian described One Eyed Man as a "polished, cleverly constructed album of strong pop songs that has cast him in the same light as his brother Nick's former band, Crowded House".

== Track listing ==
No.	Title	Writer(s)	Length
1.	"Don't You Know Me?"	Barry Palmer, Mark Seymour	3:37
2.	"Blue Morning"	Palmer, Seymour	3:58
3.	"The Ballad of the One Eyed Man"	Seymour	4:03
4.	"Ready To Go"	Seymour	4:31
5.	"Lost in Your Illusion"	Seymour	3:51
6.	"Strange Little Town"	Palmer, Seymour	3:50
7.	"See You Around"	Daryl Braithwaite, Seymour	3:51
8.	"Long Way Down"	Cameron McKenzie, Seymour	2:50
9.	"Always a Fool (For a Pretty Face)"	Daniel Denholm, Seymour	4:20
10.	"Sad Songs"	F Hunter, Seymour	4:05
11.	"On My Way Home"	David Bridie, Mark Lizotte, Seymour	8:15

== Personnel ==
- Mark Seymour – Vocals, rhythm guitar
- Mazz – drums, percussion
- Tony Floyd – drums
- Diamond Jim Kempster – bass guitars
- Rod Davies – keyboards, backing vocals
- Daniel Denholm – Korg, Hammond organ, string arrangement
- Cameron McKenzie – acoustic guitar
- Helen Mountfort – string arrangement, cello
- Hope Csutoros – violin
- Jenny Thomas – violin
- Tim Henwood – electric guitar
- Bruce Haymes – Wurlitzer
- Domenique Guiebois – violin
- Rachel Whealy – cello
- Michelle Rose – viola
- Veronique Serret – violin
- Chryss Plummer – backing vocal
- Andrew Carswell – tin whistle
- Nick Batterham – electric guitar
- Jack Howard – trumpet
- Barry Palmer – lead guitar
- Tim Neil – Hammond organ

== Charts ==
Chart performance for One Eyed Man
Chart (2001)	Peak position
Australian Albums (ARIA)	68

== Release history ==
Release history and formats for One Eyed Man
Country	Date	Format	Label	Catalogue
Australia	March 2001	CD	Mushroom	333432
