= Mayday (Mark Seymour album) =

Studio album by Mark Seymour & The Undertow
- Released: May 2015
- Recorded: Station Place, Glen Huntly, Sing Sing South, South Yarra
- Genre: Rock, pop
- Length: 53:30
- Label: Liberation Music
- Producer: Cameron McKenzie

Mark Seymour & The Undertow chronology
Seventh Heaven Club (2013)	Mayday (2015)

Professional ratings
Review scores
Source	Rating
The Age	3.5/5 stars

Mayday is the third album by Mark Seymour and the Undertow, which was released in May 2015. The album peaked at number 43 on the ARIA Charts.

Seymour said he returned to "a very old way of writing" and acknowledged a blues influence. "I've been listening to a lot of blues and the way old blues artists reverse and invert chords, but they're always the same chords," he said. "It forces you to twist the melody. It's the illusion of simplicity, but you can create a whole lot of drama." He said his storytelling had become more narrative driven. "I invent characters or occupy the space of somebody else and imagine myself in their condition, but there's a lot of me in there."

Seymour said "FIFO" was inspired by a 62-year-old worker he met after a gig at a fly-in fly-out mining camp. "He'd been doing it for 17 years. He said, 'I'm over it, but the money's too good'." He said his lyric writing had become a lot more about location and visual detail. "Frankston station is at the end of the line and you get the full cross section of Melbourne there—all classes, every kind of person. It's tough and there's a real rawness to it. You get clarity about what urban life is really like. "Struggle Street" is interesting, the drama around it makes me think people are afraid of confronting the reality of what Australian culture is like. We want to believe that everyone is cashed up and driving four-wheel-drives, and Frankston station tells you it's not."

== Track listing ==
(All songs by Mark Seymour except where noted)

1. "Home Free" – 4:26
2. "Football Train" – 3:17
3. "Two Dollar Punter" – 4:18
4. "Irish Breakfast" (Mark Seymour, Geoff Goodfellow) – 4:31
5. "Courtroom 32" – 4:41
6. "FIFO" – 3:57
7. "Carry Me Home" – 3:24
8. "Oblivion" – 4:00
9. "Asylum" – 4:07
10. "Thirsty Old Men" – 4:31
11. "Kosciusko" – 4:16
12. "Lucky Land" – 4:05
13. "Red Flags" – 3:54

== Personnel ==
- Mark Seymour — vocals, rhythm guitar
- Cameron McKenzie — guitars, vocals, keyboards
- John Favaro — bass, vocals
- Pete Maslen — drums, vocals

== Charts ==
Chart (2015)	Peak position
Australian Albums (ARIA)	43
