= Helen Durham =

Australian lawyer

Helen Durham AO
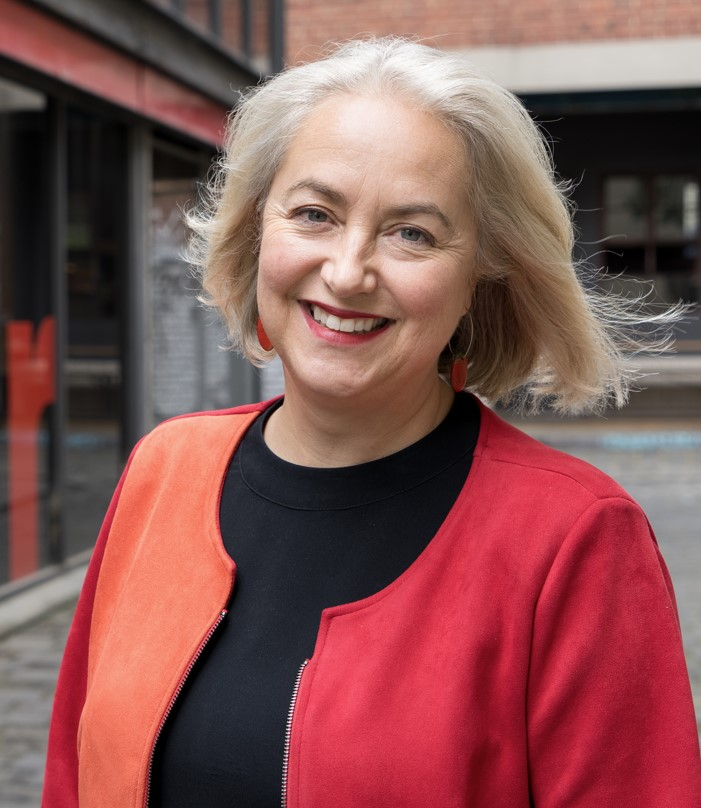
- Helen Durham in 2023
- Born: 1968 (age 57–58); Mount Isa, Queensland, Australia
- Occupations: CEO, humanitarian lawyer and academic
- Spouse: Greg Arnold
- Children: 2

Helen Anne Durham AO (born 1968) is a humanitarian lawyer and academic, and the CEO of RedR Australia.

== Education ==
Durham has a PhD in international humanitarian law and international criminal law from The University of Melbourne.

== Career ==
=== Humanitarian ===
Durham has devoted her career to strengthening legal protections for many of the world's most vulnerable people, notably the victims of war. This includes operational humanitarian missions with the International Committee of the Red Cross (ICRC) and as an advocate on humanitarian affairs within Australia and globally. She is one of only a handful of international humanitarian lawyers to assist the ICRC in an update of the Commentaries to the Geneva Conventions and their Additional Protocols, in particular provisions relating to special protections for women.

Durham was a key player in the drafting of an historic resolution to prohibit the use of nuclear weapons. She also played a key role in the creation of the International Criminal Court (ICC) at The Hague in 2007. The ICC is the first permanent, international criminal court established to help end impunity for the perpetrators of the most serious crimes of concern to the international community.

From 2014 to 2022, Durham was the Director of International Law and Policy at the ICRC, the first woman and Australian to hold this position. Prior to this, she had served as Director of International Law, Strategy, Planning and Research at the Australian Red Cross. She has worked as Head of Office for ICRC Australia, as well as a legal adviser to the ICRC Pacific region delegation.

Durham is currently the CEO of RedR Australia, a humanitarian organization that identifies, trains and deploys experts into crisis and conflicts globally.

Durham is also a board member for Geneva Call, an NGO that works to improve the protection of civilians in armed conflict.

On 30 October 2024, Durham was elected to the Standing Commission of the Red Cross and Red Crescent as a representative for the Australian Red Cross.

=== Academic ===
Durham is an expert in international humanitarian and criminal law, and has published academic work on topics such as women and war; the laws of war; and the prosecution of crimes against civilians.

Durham has worked at the Asia Pacific Centre of Military Law at Melbourne Law School as Director of Research.

She is currently a professorial fellow at Melbourne Law School and lectures in international humanitarian law.

Durham is also a senior fellow at the United States Military Academy's Lieber Institute.

== Honors ==
In 2014, Durham was inducted into the Victorian Honour Roll of Women.

In 2017, Durham was appointed an Officer of the Order of Australia for distinguished service to international relations in the area of humanitarian and criminal law, to the protection of women during times of armed conflict, and to legal education.

== Personal life ==
Durham is married to singer/songwriter Greg Arnold. The couple have two children. She was the inspiration for the song "Happy Birthday Helen" by Arnold's band Things of Stone and Wood.
