= Greg Arnold =

Australian singer-songwriter, multi-instrumentalist

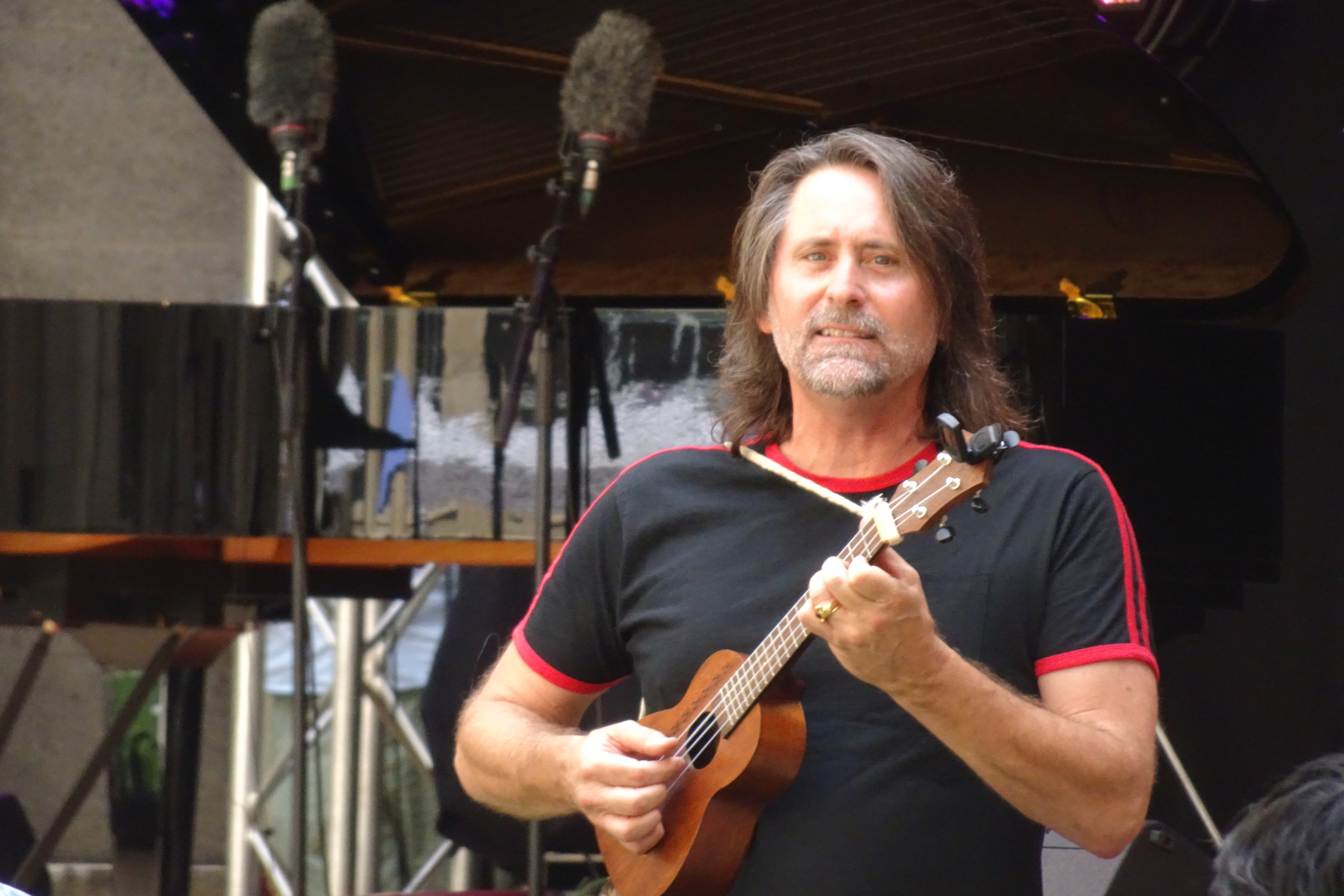
- Geneva, June 2021

Background information
- Born: Gregory Charles Arnold; 25 July 1966 (age 59)
- Genres: Folk rock
- Occupations: Songwriter-singer, multi-instrumentalist, producer, lecturer
- Instruments: Vocals, guitar, keyboards
- Years active: 1986–present
- Labels: Columbia. MGM. Unagi (CH), Mixmasters. Shock. CMBE. FiidoFestival

Gregory Charles Arnold is an Australian singer-songwriter, multi-instrumentalist, producer and academic. Arnold won the APRA Songwriter of the Year award in 1993 and performs regularly as a solo artist and with his folk rock band, Things of Stone and Wood.

== Biography ==
By 1986 Greg Arnold was lead vocalist with Melbourne indie rock band, 13 at Midnight, which released a cover version of "She Sells Sanctuary" (originally by The Cult), on Cleopatra Records. The original line-up were Arnold, Russell Hall on bass guitar, Peter Pilley on drums, and Byron Smith on lead guitar (music journalist at Juke Magazine). Hall was soon replaced by Michael Allen on bass guitar. The group followed with an album, Warring Tribes, in 1987 on Cleopatra Records.

By 1989, the group 13 at Midnight had disbanded, Arnold recalled in March 1993, "I wasn't particularly keen to get into a band after Thirteen at Midnight ... but [Allen] kind of talked me into it really, and I think from that we learnt a few things we didn't want to do again – and it's worked out". In 1989 after a break of a few months with Arnold on lead vocals, acoustic guitar, keyboards; and Allen on bass guitar, backing vocals, guitar, keyboards; they formed a folk rock group, Things of Stone and Wood, with Justin Brady on violin, mandolin, harmonica, guitar; and Tony Floyd on drums, percussion, recorder, backing vocals.

Arnold explained the group's name, "[it's] kind of organic and evocative, yeah, that's right. I'll have to remember that one". One of their earliest gigs was the 21st birthday party for Arnold's then-girlfriend, Helen Durham. Arnold wrote "Happy Birthday Helen", for Durham's 22nd birthday:

[it] was just a gift for Helen ... it was never intended to be released. But when I played it to [Allen] he said, "This is a ripper, we've got to do this song" ... The drive along the Yarra is all true ... We kissed on the bridge that fell down ... [it] was actually London Bridge on the Great Ocean Road ... It was such an intensely personal love song, so it was weird hearing the song everywhere.

— Greg Arnold quoted in Molly Meldrum presents 50 years of rock in Australia (2007) by Jeff Jenkins and Ian "Molly" Meldrum, p. 288–289.

Durham recalled being told by fans that "she was not the subject of the song ... People would say they knew the real Helen". Arnold and Durham were later married. "Happy Birthday Helen" was issued in December 1992, which peaked at No. 9 on the ARIA Singles Chart, the highest point for any of the band's singles. The group issued their debut album, The Yearning, in March the following year, which reached No.8 on the related ARIA Albums Chart. Arnold wrote most of the songs for the group. At the ARIA Music Awards of 1993 the group won 'Best New Talent'. During late that year they were touring Europe, including a support gig for Midnight Oil in the United Kingdom. While there Arnold won 'Songwriter of the Year' at the 1993 APRA Awards.

The group released additional material until late 1998 when they went into hiatus including "Junk Theatre" (which also reached No 8 on the ARIA Albums Chart) and "Wildflowers" (which was one of APRA's top four radio played songs for 1994) . During the hiatus Arnold formed the Greg Arnold Trio, which performed in Melbourne. He then formed Tricycle (aka Greg Arnold's Tricycle) with Anita Hustas on double bass and Ian Kitney on drums. They released their debut album, Super, in September 1999. The lead single, "Oh No Not You Again", preceded it in August. They enjoyed extensive airplay on the Australian Broadcasting Corporation, Super was named album of the week by Coast FM in January 2001.

Things of Stone & Wood reconvened in 2001, releasing further albums. They disbanded by 2006. Arnold released a second album in November that year, Lost Marie, a collection of melodic short stories. Arnold said "I’ve been banging on about myself for about twenty years... I thought it was about time to make something up". His ballads are about a variety of social non-conformists. He was accompanied on acoustic instrumentation by Kitney on drums and Pete Haydon on brass, percussion and supporting vocals.

Arnold has continued to write songs, perform, and produce records for other artists including Melbourne indie-rock band Skipping Girl Vinegar, Carus Thompson, Stonefield and Georgia Fields acoustic group Junior's LP Sample (2000) and Restless (2001), Merri-May Gill's Designated Driver (2004). For Designated Driver Arnold also co-wrote four tracks with Gill, and supplied guitar and bass guitar.

From 2007, he was part of a trio, Greg Arnold and the Lost Marias (which became The Swamp Dandies). This act also has John Bedggood (Bernard Fanning) on fiddle, mando and piano and Ian Kitney (Tim Rogers) on drums. His 2011 album with The Swamp Dandies received great reviews ("nimble...horse power pop" – Rhythms Magazine) and gained international recognition when the "charming" and "hilarious" clip for "Olivia" was endorsed by Olivia Newton-John.

=== Personal life ===
Greg Arnold married Helen Durham (born ca. 1968), a humanitarian lawyer and CEO of humanitarian organisation RedR Australia, and senior fellow at Melbourne Law School.

Arnold has a Bachelor of Arts degree (Honours in English Literature) from Melbourne University and a Master's of Education (Arts Administration) from RMIT. He has a PhD from the University of Tasmania. He was a senior lecturer and the head of the Bachelor of Music Industry program at Melbourne Polytechnic from 2011 to 2014, when it was known as NMIT.

The couple have two children.

In 2006, Arnold wrote "Close My Eyes" for the Australian Red Cross and recorded it with former Midnight Oil drummer, Rob Hirst, and Paul Greene. The song received airplay across Asia. Arnold related "[it] was inspired by the realisation that it is so easy to ignore all the terrible news in the world. The onslaught of images one sees and hears via various media outlets can make us emotionally immune".

Arnold currently plays as a key forward for the Geneva Jets in The AFL Switzerland football league. Due to his graceful elegance, and composure under pressure, Arnold is known by his teammates as "Dr Silk". Arnold's reliable set-shot and forward-line creativity has helped the Jets establish themselves as the dominant force in the Swiss Australian Football League. Arnold was a linchpin of the Jets 2019 Reserve and Senior twin premierships, booting three and two goals in the respective Grand Finals.

== Discography ==
=== 13 at Midnight ===
Discography according to Australian Rock Database:

- "She Sells Sanctuary" (1986) single
- Warring Tribes (1987) LP

=== Things of Stone and Wood ===
Discography according to Australian Rock Database:

==== Studio albums ====
List of studio albums, with selected chart positions
Title	Album details	Peak chart positions	Certification
Title	Album details	AUS	Certification
The Yearning	Released: February 1993; Label: Columbia (473586); Format: CD, cassette	8	ARIA: Gold
Junk Theatre	Released: March 1995; Label: Columbia (478346); Format: CD, cassette	8	
The Man with the Perfect Hair	Released: November 1995; Label: Shock (things 003); Format: CD	—	
Whirligig	Released: September 1996; Label: Shock (things 005); Format: CD	—	
Rollercoaster	Released: 2003; Label: Mixmasters (MXR003); Format: CD	—	

==== Live albums ====
List of live albums, with selected details
Title	Album details
Live at the Espy	Released: October 1996; Label: Shock (things 006); Format: CD; NB: Limited edition of 1000 numbered and autographed copies

==== Compilation albums ====
List of compilation albums, with selected details
Title	Album details
So Far: Best of Things of Stone & Wood 1992–2002	Released: 2002; Label: Barking Mad/ Universal Music Australia (BM0002); Format: CD
The Essential	Released: June 2014; Label: Sony Music Australia (88843077562); Format: CD, digital download

==== Singles ====
Year	Title	Peak chart positions	Album
Year	Title	AUS	Album
1991	"The Hopeful"	—	non-album single
1992	"Share This Wine"	46	The Yearning
1992	"Happy Birthday Helen"	9	The Yearning
1993	"Rock This Boat"	51	The Yearning
1993	"Single Perfect Raindrop"	50	The Yearning
1994	"Wildflowers"	41	Junk Theatre
1995	"Churchill's Black Dog"	34	Junk Theatre
1995	"Hello Crazy Shadow"	—	Junk Theatre
1996	"Blink"	—	Whirligig
2002	"Ship of the Damned"	—	So Far: Best of Things of Stone & Wood 1992–2002
2003	"Angeline Forgive Me/Foldaway Heart"	—	Rollercoaster
"—" denotes a recording that did not chart or was not released in that territory.

=== Solo ===
- Super (with Tricycle September 1999)
- Lost Marie (November 2006)
- Fall (with The Swamp Dandies 2011)
- Against the Wheel (October 2018)
- In the Sky (October 2023)
