= Embedded (Mark Seymour album) =

Studio album by Mark Seymour
- Released: 27 April 2004
- Recorded: Station Studios, Carnegie, Victoria, 2000–2003
- Genre: Rock, pop
- Length: 43:45
- Label: Liberation Music
- Producer: Cameron McKenzie

Mark Seymour chronology
One Eyed Man (2001)	Embedded (2004)	Daytime and the Dark (2005)

Embedded is the third studio album by Australian musician, Mark Seymour. The album was released in April 2004 and had as its theme issues of life in the Australian suburbs, touching on issues of alcoholism and corporate careers. The album had a favorable reception in reviews in The Australian and The Age, receiving three out of five stars.

== Track listing ==
1. "43 in the Shade" (Seymour, N. Barker) - 4:13
2. "Try Not To Try" (Seymour, C. McKenzie) - 3:50
3. "In The Kitchen of a Perfect Home" (Seymour, D. McCormack) - 3:36
4. "A Shoulder To Cry On" (Seymour) - 3:06
5. "Paradise Downunder" (Seymour, C. McKenzie) - 4:20
6. "Left Alive" (Seymour, C. McKenzie) - 3:22
7. "Made Man" - (Seymour) 4:43
8. "Waratah Street" (Seymour, M. Ford) - 4:21
9. "Out of This World" (Seymour, G. Arnold) - 3:38
10. "Show Me Love" (Seymour, C. McKenzie) - 4:19
11. "Moment of Doubt" (Seymour, C. McKenzie) - 4:04

== Charts ==
Chart performance for Embedded
Chart (2004)	Peak position
Australian Albums (ARIA)	159

== Release history ==
Country	Date	Format	Label	Catalogue
Australia	April 2004	CD	Liberation Records	LIBCD6092.2
