= King Without a Clue =

Studio album by Mark Seymour
- Released: September 1997
- Recorded: 1997
- Studio: Sing Sing Studios
- Genre: Rock, pop
- Length: 45:45
- Label: Mushroom Records
- Producer: Barry Palmer

Mark Seymour chronology
King Without a Clue (1997)	One Eyed Man (2001)

Singles from King Without a Clue
- 1. "Last Ditch Cabaret" Released: May 1997; 2. "The Ghost of Vainglory" Released: September 1997; 3. "Home Again" Released: April 1998; 4. "You Don't Have to Cry Anymore" Released: September 1998

King Without a Clue is the debut studio album by Australian musician Mark Seymour. The album was released in September 1997 and peaked at number 53 on the ARIA Charts. The album release included a second limited edition disc, titled "Live at The Continental". All of the tracks on this second disc were recorded live on 17 May 1997, at the Continental Cafe, in Melbourne, Australia.

At the ARIA Music Awards of 1998, the album earned Seymour a nomination in the category of Best Male Artist.

== Reception ==
Professional ratings
Review scores
Source	Rating
AllMusic	4/5 stars

Jonathan Lewis from AllMusic "King Without a Clue is a disc of introspective, country-tinged songs... Seymour's vocals are as raw and aggressive as ever, although ballads like the haunting "The Ghost of Vainglory" show the same emotional side to Seymour that made "Throw Your Arms Around Me" an instant classic in the mid 1980s. 'Last Ditch Cabaret', 'Home Again' and 'You Don't Have to Cry Anymore' are some of the best tracks here and serve to highlight that Mark Seymour is one of Australia's finest singer/songwriters."

== Track listing ==
No.	Title	Writer(s)	Length
1.	"Last Ditch Cabaret"	Mark Seymour	4:52
2.	"You Don't Have to Cry Anymore"	Seymour	3:16
3.	"The Ghost of Vainglory"	Barry Palmer, Seymour	4:47
4.	"King Without a Clue"	Seymour	3:45
5.	"Look What She's Done to You"	Palmer, Seymour	4:21
6.	"Home Again"	Palmer, Seymour	3:54
7.	"Deathwish"	Seymour	3:59
8.	"Cry Wolf"	Seymour	3:29
9.	"Can't Crawl That Way"	Seymour	3:41
10.	"The One You Love"	Seymour	3:37
11.	"Until the Day They Die"	Palmer, Seymour	4:02

Live at The Continental
No.	Title	Writer(s)	Length
1.	"Radio Death Son"	Seymour	4:26
2.	"Can't Crawl That Way"	Seymour	4:00
3.	"The Ghost of Vainglory"	Palmer, Seymour	4:33
4.	"Home Again"	Palmer, Seymour	4:07
5.	"Richard Cory"	Paul Simon	3:35
6.	"Look What She's Done to You""	Palmer, Seymour	4:49

== Charts ==
Chart performance for King Without a Clue
Chart (1997)	Peak position
Australian Albums (ARIA)	53

== Release history ==
Country	Date	Format	Label	Catalogue
Australia	September 1997	2x CD	Mushroom Records	MUSH33040.2
