= Rock This Boat =

- CD single cover

Single by Things of Stone and Wood

from the album The Yearning
- Released: March 1993
- Length: 3:38
- Label: Capitol
- Songwriter(s): Greg Arnold
- Producer(s): James Black

Things of Stone and Wood singles chronology
"Happy Birthday Helen" (1992)	"Rock This Boat" (1993)	"Single Perfect Raindrop" (1993)

"Rock This Boat" is a song written by Greg Arnold and recorded by Australian folk-rock band Things of Stone and Wood. The song was released in March 1993 as the third single from the band's debut studio album The Yearning. "Rock This Boat" peaked at number 51 on the ARIA Charts.

== Track listing ==
Australian CD Single
No.	Title	Length
1.	"Rock This Boat"	3:38
2.	"They Won't Know Why" (Hippy Mix)	4:00
3.	"Poison"	3:00

== Charts ==
Chart performance for "Rock This Boat"
Chart (1993)	Peak position
Australia (ARIA)	51
