= Westgate (album) =

Studio album by Mark Seymour
- Released: June 2007
- Recorded: Hawthorn, Victoria
- Genre: Rock, pop
- Length: 49:50
- Label: Liberation Music
- Producer: Cameron McKenzie

Mark Seymour chronology
Daytime and the Dark (2005)	Westgate (2007)	Titanic (2007)

Westgate is the fifth studio album by Australian musician Mark Seymour released in June 2007. The album was described as centred on "everyday heroes", with the title track recounting the tale of a real-life worker who was on duty when Melbourne's West Gate Bridge collapsed on 15 October 1970, killing 35 construction workers. "The Year of the Dog" which was initially written as a football song for the Western Bulldogs football team, became the saga of a friend with a drink problem. The album was named as one of the top 10 albums of the year by the Sunday Herald Sun.

The album's title track had previously been included in a Melbourne Theatre Workers' production, We Built This City, performed at Scienceworks in the suburb of Spotswood in early 2006.

== Track listing ==
(All songs written by Mark Seymour except where indicated)

1. "Westgate" – 4:50
2. "Tobruk Pin" (Seymour, Geoff Goodfellow) – 2:41
3. "Jerusalem" (Steve Earle) – 3:52
4. "Love Is a Heavy Load" – 4:18
5. "Walk Through Fire" – 4:31
6. "The Year of the Dog" – 4:02
7. "Hell Broke Free" – 3:43
8. "18 Again" – 4:00
9. "Master of Spin" – 5:16
10. "Feel the Lord" – 4:54
11. "Mississauga" – 4:08
12. "The Light on the Hill" – 3:34
13. "The Stayer" – 3:35 (iTunes bonus track)
14. "Monday to Friday" – 3:46 (iTunes bonus track)

== Personnel ==
- Mark Seymour - vocals, guitars
- Scott Alpin - keyboards
- Steve Hadley - bass
- Pip Healey - fiddle
- Dave Larkin - lead guitar
- Jake Mason - keyboards
- Cameron McKenzie - guitars
- Nick Higgins - lap steel
- Nick Seymour - bass
- Tony Floyd - drums
- Kit Warhurst - drums
- Chris Wilson - harp
- Lisa Miller - vocals ("Hell Broke Free")

== Charts ==
Chart performance for Westgate
Chart (2007)	Peak position
Australian Albums (ARIA)	128
