= Share This Wine =

- CD single cover

Single by Things of Stone and Wood

from the album The Yearning
- Released: September 1992
- Label: Capitol
- Songwriter(s): Greg Arnold
- Producer(s): James Black

Things of Stone and Wood singles chronology
"The Hopeful" (1991)	"Share This Wine" (1992)	"Happy Birthday Helen" (1992)

"Share This Wine" is a song written by Greg Arnold and recorded by Australian folk-rock band Things of Stone and Wood. The song was released in September 1992 as the lead single from the band's debut studio album The Yearning. "Share This Wine" peaked at number 46 on the ARIA Charts in October 1992.

At the ARIA Music Awards of 1993, the song was nominated for two awards; winning Best New Talent.

== Track listing ==
Australian CD Single
No.	Title	Length
1.	"Share This Wine"	3:55
2.	"In Our Home"	3:54

European CD Single 1
No.	Title	Length
1.	"Share This Wine"	3:55
2.	"In Our Home"	3:54
3.	"They Won't Know Why" (Hippy Mix)	4:19

European CD Single 2
No.	Title	Length
1.	"Share This Wine"	3:55
2.	"She Will Survive"	3:23
3.	"Poison"	2:53

== Charts ==
Chart (1992)	Peak position
Australia (ARIA)	46
Germany (GfK)	87
