= Churchill's Black Dog =

- CD single cover

Single by Things of Stone and Wood

from the album Junk Theatre
- Released: February 1995
- Genre: Pop/Rock
- Label: Capitol
- Songwriter(s): Greg Arnold
- Producer(s): James Black

Things of Stone and Wood singles chronology
"Wild Flowers" (1994)	"Churchill's Black Dog" (1995)	"Hello Crazy Shadow" (1995)

"Churchill's Black Dog" is a song written by Greg Arnold and recorded by Australian folk-rock band Things of Stone and Wood. The song was released in February 1995 as the second single from the band's second studio album Junk Theatre. "Churchill's Black Dog" peaked at number 34 on the ARIA Charts in March 1995.

== Track listing ==
CD Single
No.	Title	Length
1.	"Churchill's Black Dog"	3:15
2.	"What Happened to You"	4:27
3.	"Lullaby" (Instrumental)	2:11

== Charts ==
Chart (1995)	Peak position
Australia (ARIA)	34
