= Happy Birthday Helen =

- CD single cover

Single by Things of Stone and Wood

from the album The Yearning
- Released: November 1992
- Length: 3:53
- Label: Capitol
- Songwriter: Greg Arnold
- Producer: James Black

Things of Stone and Wood singles chronology
"Share This Wine" (1992)	"Happy Birthday Helen" (1992)	"Rock This Boat" (1993)

"Happy Birthday Helen" is a song written by Greg Arnold and recorded by Australian folk-rock band Things of Stone and Wood. The song was released in November 1992 as the second single from the band's debut studio album The Yearning. "Happy Birthday Helen" peaked at number 9 on the ARIA Charts in February 1993.

The song was parodied on The Late Show as "We've Just Run Out of Melbourne Cliches".

== Track listing ==
Australian CD Single
No.	Title	Length
1.	"Happy Birthday Helen"	3:53
2.	"Hand Grenade"	4:19
3.	"She Will Survive"	3:23
4.	"Call Out My Name"	4:34
5.	"My Prayer"	4:36

== Charts ==
=== Weekly charts ===
Weekly chart performance for "Happy Birthday Helen"
Chart (1992–1993)	Peak position
Australia (ARIA)	9

=== Year-end charts ===
Year-end chart performance for "Happy Birthday Helen"
Chart (1993)	Position
Australia (ARIA)	68

== Certifications ==
Certifications for "Happy Birthday Helen"
Region	Certification	Certified units/sales
Australia (ARIA)	Gold	35,000^{^}
^{^} Shipments figures based on certification alone.
