= Holy Grail (Hunters & Collectors song) =

Single by Hunters & Collectors

from the album Cut
- Released: March 1993
- Recorded: 1991–92; Festival Studios, Sydney
- Genre: Pub rock
- Length: 3:50
- Label: Mushroom
- Songwriters: Mark Seymour, Jeremy Smith, Doug Falconer, John Archer, Barry Palmer, Michael Waters, Robert Miles, John Howard
- Producers: Don Gehman, Rick Will

Hunters & Collectors singles chronology
"Tears of Joy" (1992)	"Holy Grail" (1993)	"Imaginary Girl" (1993)

Holy Grail
- UK release (Mushroom Records)

"Holy Grail" is a song performed by the Australian band Hunters & Collectors on their 1992 album Cut. With lyrics referring to popular Holy Grail mythology, the song is an anthemic single inspired by Napoleon's march to Russia in 1812, but also referencing the Hunters & Collectors' flagging attempts to "crack" the American market.

Singer Mark Seymour said, "With the lyrics, I'd been reading a Jeanette Winterson novel, The Passion. It was a story about Napoleon's chef when he invaded Russia. The army was destroyed by the weather. It's a story about survival. It's a really powerful book and somehow I drew this analogy between the idea of this guy managing to survive this incredible ordeal and Hunters and Collectors making this excruciating record."

The song has since become an Australian rules football anthem, particularly with the reference to the premiership cup and the AFL Grand Final as a stand-in for the titular holy grail. Channel Ten used the song to open and close its AFL broadcasts between 2002 and 2006. Seymour performed the song as part of the AFL Grand Final's pre-match entertainment in 1998, 2002 and 2009 and half-time entertainment in 2013 and 2023. This song was used for many years as the theme song of the Queensland Bulls cricket team in the quest for the Sheffield Shield, its own "Holy Grail". It was also featured as the theme song to the Australian rugby league movie Footy Legends.

In 2013, a cover version of "Holy Grail" by The Rubens appeared on the tribute album Crucible – The Songs of Hunters & Collectors.

In January 2018, as part of Triple M's "Ozzest 100", the 'most Australian' songs of all time, "Holy Grail" was ranked number 30. In 2025, the song placed 50 in the Triple J Hottest 100 of Australian Songs.

== Track listing ==
All tracks are written by Mark Seymour, Jeremy Smith, Doug Falconer, John Archer, Barry Palmer, Michael Waters, Robert Miles, John Howard

No.	Title	Length
1.	"Holy Grail"	3:50
2.	"True Tears of Joy" (live & acoustic)	3:43
3.	"Where Do You Go?" (live & acoustic)	3:14
4.	"When the River Runs Dry" (live & acoustic)	3:49
5.	"Holy Grail" (live & acoustic)	3:21
Total length:		17:57

All tracks are written by Mark Seymour, Jeremy Smith, Doug Falconer, John Archer, Barry Palmer, Michael Waters, Robert Miles, John Howard

UK single (18 April 1994)
No.	Title	Length
1.	"Holy Grail"	3:52
2.	"Head Above Water"	4:24
3.	"True Tears of Joy"	4:35
4.	"Grindstone"	3:47
Total length:		16:38

== Personnel ==
Credited to:

Hunters & Collectors members

- John Archer – bass guitar
- Doug Falconer – drums
- John 'Jack' Howard – trumpet
- Robert Miles – live sound, art director
- Barry Palmer – lead guitar
- Mark Seymour – vocals, guitar
- Jeremy Smith – French horn
- Michael Waters – trombone, keyboards

Recording details

- Producer – Don Gehman ("Holy Grail")
- Associate Producer/mixing – Rick Will ("Holy Grail")
  - Assistant mixing – Lori Fumer ("Holy Grail")
- Engineer/recording – Gary Cranston (tracks 2–5)
- Remixing – Tony Espie
- Studios – Festival Studios, Sydney (recording); The Grey Room; Larabee Studios, Los Angeles (mixing) ("Holy Grail")
  - MMM Studios, Melbourne (recording/engineering); Platinum Studios, Melbourne (remixing) (tracks 2–5)

== Charts ==
=== Weekly charts ===
Chart (1993)	Peak position
Australia (ARIA)	20
New Zealand (Recorded Music NZ)	25

=== Year-end charts ===
Chart (1993)	Position
Australia (ARIA)	72
