= Mark Seymour =

Australian musician (born 1956)

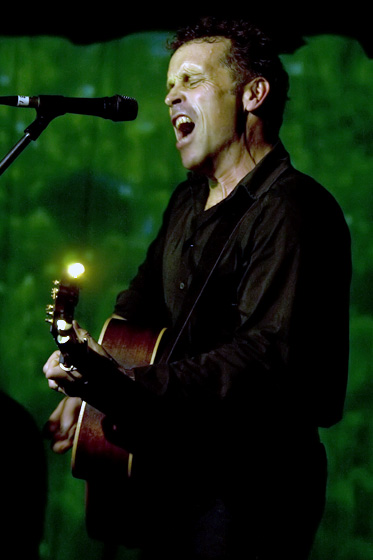
- Seymour performing at The Corner Hotel in Melbourne, June 2008

Background information
- Born: Mark Jeremy Seymour; 26 July 1956 (age 70); Benalla, Victoria, Australia
- Origin: Melbourne, Victoria, Australia
- Genres: Rock, blues rock
- Occupations: Singer-songwriter; musician; author; teacher
- Instruments: Guitar, vocals
- Years active: 1981–present
- Labels: Mushroom, Sony
- Website: markseymour.com.au

Mark Jeremy Seymour (born 26 July 1956) is an Australian singer-songwriter and musician. He was the frontman and songwriter of rock band Hunters & Collectors from 1981 until 1998. Seymour has carved a solo career, releasing his debut solo album in 1997 and winning an ARIA Award in 2001 for One Eyed Man in the category of Best Adult Contemporary Album.

== Early years ==
Mark Jeremy Seymour was born on 26 July 1956 in Benalla, Victoria, to Frank and Paula Seymour. He has two older sisters, Hilary and Helen, and a younger brother, Nick (born 1958) – later bass guitarist for Crowded House. His mother encouraged all four children to learn musical instruments and sing. He initially learned piano but switched to guitar as a teenager. Seymour and his family moved to Melbourne in 1972. He was a resident of Ormond College at the University of Melbourne where he graduated in 1978 and was qualified to teach. He later lived in the St Kilda area.

== Career ==
=== 1980: The Jetsonnes ===
By 1980, Seymour, on lead guitar, was a member of The Jetsonnes, a post-punk pop group formed in Melbourne; it had John Archer on bass guitar, Doug Falconer on drums, Margot O'Neill on lead vocals, and Ray Tosti-Gueira on guitar. Clinton Walker described the group as "lighter, bouncier (rather than funkier) and more infectious than other like-minded bands such as Models". In June 1980, record label Missing Link issued a double A-sided single "Newspaper" by the Jetsonnes and "Miniskirts in Moscow" by International Exiles. The Jetsonnes, Models, and International Exiles were "the first bands to rise out of Melbourne's hothouse punk, new wave explosion playing an exuberant brand of neo-pop".

=== 1981–1998: Hunters & Collectors ===
In 1981, Seymour formed Hunters & Collectors from the remnants of The Jetsonnes with Archer, Falconer, and Tosti-Gueira. According to musicologist Ian McFarlane, this was "a far more radical and unremitting concept" and Seymour, with his "blue labourer's singlet, bulging biceps, introspective angst and impassioned vocals" became the "thinking woman's sex symbol".

Between 1981 and 1998, Hunters & Collectors released nine studio albums, and they were inducted into the ARIA Hall of Fame in 2005.

In 1992, Seymour released his debut solo single, "Hey Boys" (featuring Paul Kelly), from the soundtrack of the film Garbo. The song peaked at number 71 on the ARIA Charts.

Seymour wrote the Hunters & Collectors song "Holy Grail", which although not intended to be about sport, has been widely used in television broadcasts of Australian Football League matches, especially the AFL Grand Final. It was also used by the Queensland cricket team in the years leading up to its first Sheffield Shield win in 1995. Seymour has performed this song and others at several AFL Grand Finals. It has won many accolades, including multiple appearances in the Triple J Hottest 100, including most recently at 50th place in the Triple J Hottest 100 of Australian Songs, a 2025 poll.

=== 1997–2010: Solo career ===
In May 1997, whilst still officially part of Hunters & Collectors, Seymour released his first solo single, "Last Ditch Cabaret". The song peaked at number 85 on the ARIA Charts. At the ARIA Music Awards of 1997, the song earned him two nominations; Best Male Artist and Breakthrough Single. "The Ghost of Vainglory" and "Home Again" followed and Seymour released his debut studio album King Without a Clue in September 1997. The album peaked at number 53 on the ARIA charts and earned Seymour another nomination for Best Male Artist at the ARIA Music Awards of 1998.

In March 2001, Seymour released his second studio album, One Eyed Man, which peaked at number 61 on the ARIA Charts and won Best Adult Contemporary Album at the ARIA Music Awards of 2001.

In April 2004, Seymour released Embedded. The album did not chart. In September 2005, Seymour released Daytime & the Dark, an album, featuring acoustic versions of mostly Hunters & Collectors songs. The album peaked at number 99 on the ARIA Charts. In September 2007, Seymour released Titanic, a second album of acoustic versions of mostly Hunters & Collectors songs.

=== 2011–present: Mark Seymour & The Undertow ===
In 2011, Seymour formed and began recording and with a band again. The band, titled Mark Seymour & The Undertow released Undertow in May 2011.

In 2013, Mark Seymour & The Undertow released Seventh Heaven Club, an album which paid homage to love songs, featuring tracks by Bob Dylan, Dave Dobbyn, Otis Redding, Neil Young, Tom Petty and Lucinda Williams.

Mark Seymour & The Undertow released the album Roll Back The Stone on 24 March 2015. It was recorded live at Melbourne's Bakehouse Studios and featured 24 tracks from Seymour's back catalogue, stretching back to 1985, reinterpreted by The Undertow.

In 2020, Seymour released his tenth non-Hunters studio album (and fourth as Mark Seymour & The Undertow), titled Slow Dawn.

In 2024, Seymour's eleventh non-Hunters studio album (and fifth with Mark Seymour & The Undertow), The Boxer, was released.

== Personal life ==
Seymour was divorced from Jo Vautier in 2023. They were married for 29 years. They have two daughters, Eva and Hannah.

His long standing girlfriend is singer Linda Bull.

Both of Seymour's parents and his two sisters were teachers, so following on from their careers Seymour became a teacher for about ten weeks but decided to focus on becoming a musician.

In 2008, Seymour released his memoir, Thirteen Tonne Theory, which was published by Penguin Books, detailing his experiences with Hunters & Collectors.

== Discography ==
=== Studio albums ===
Title	Album details	Peak chart positions
Title	Album details	AUS
King Without a Clue	Released: September 1997; Label: Mushroom (MUSH33040); Format: CD	53
One Eyed Man	Released: March 2001; Label: Mushroom (333432); Format: CD	67
Embedded	Released: April 2004; Label: Liberation (LIBCD6092.2); Format: CD	159
Daytime and the Dark	Released: March 2005; Label: Liberation Blue (BLUE075); Format: CD, Digital download; Re-released in June 2012 under the title Greatest Hits Acoustic	99
Westgate	Released: June 2007; Label: Liberation Blue (LIBCD9241); Format: CD, DD	128
Titanic	Released: September 2007; Label: Liberation Blue (BLUE156); Format: CD, DD; Re-released in June 2012 under the title Greatest Hits Acoustic 2	197
Undertow (credited to Mark Seymour & The Undertow)	Released: 27 May 2011; Label: Liberation Blue (LMCD0142); Format: CD, DD	51
Seventh Heaven Club (credited to Mark Seymour & The Undertow)	Released: 1 March 2013; Label: Liberation Blue (LMCD0215); Format: CD, DD	116
Mayday (credited to Mark Seymour & The Undertow)	Released: 29 May 2015; Label: Liberation Blue (LMCD0268); Format: CD, DD	43
Slow Dawn (credited to Mark Seymour & The Undertow)	Released: 29 May 2020; Label: Bloodlines (Blood68); Format: CD, LP, DD, streaming	—
The Boxer (credited to Mark Seymour & The Undertow)	Released: April 2024; Label: Bloodlines; Format: CD, DD, streaming	41
"—" denotes a recording that did not chart or was not released in that territory.

=== Live albums ===
Title	Album details
Ballad of the One Eyed Man – Live at the Basement	Released: 2001; Label: Warner Music Australia (BASE002); Format: CD+DVD
From Bondi to Bedlam	Released: 2007; Label: Liberation (LIBDVD1083); Format: DVD+CD, DD
Roll Back the Stone: 1985–2016 (credited to Mark Seymour & The Undertow)	Released: 24 March 2017; Label: Liberation Music (LMCD0310); Format: 2×CD, DD, streaming

=== Compilation albums ===
Title	Album details
The Closest Living Thing	Released: 2008 (Sweden); Label: Promising (LPCD-44); Format: CD; Compilation of tracks from Daytime and the Dark and Titanic

=== Singles ===
List of singles, with selected chart positions, showing year released and album name
Title	Year	Peak chart positions	Album
Title	Year	AUS	Album
"Hey Boys" (with Paul Kelly)	1992	71	Garbo (soundtrack)
"Last Ditch Cabaret"	1997	85	King Without a Clue
"The Ghost of Vainglory"	1997	152	King Without a Clue
"Home Again"	1998	201	King Without a Clue
"You Don't Have to Cry Anymore"	1998	202	King Without a Clue
"Do You Know Me?"	2001	153	One Eyed Man
"The Ballad of the One Eyed Man"	2001	—	One Eyed Man
"A Shoulder to Cry On"	2004	—	Embedded
"Westgate"	2007	—	Westgate
"The Whole World Is Dreaming"	2020	—	Slow Dawn
"The Whole World Is Dreaming" (live) (featuring Missy Higgins)	2021	—	
"Even When I'm Sleeping"	2023	—	Mushroom: Fifty Years of Making Noise (Reimagined)
"—" denotes a recording that did not chart or was not released in that territory.

== Awards ==
=== ARIA Music Awards ===
The ARIA Music Awards is an annual awards ceremony that recognises excellence, innovation, and achievement across all genres of Australian music. Seymour has won one award from five nominations.

Year	Nominee / work	Award	Result
1997	"Last Ditch Cabaret"	Best Male Artist	Nominated
1997	"Last Ditch Cabaret"	Breakthrough Artist – Single	Nominated
1998	King Without a Clue	Best Male Artist	Nominated
2001	One Eyed Man	Best Adult Contemporary Album	Won
2011	Undertow	Best Adult Contemporary Album	Nominated
