= Josh Simons (media executive) =

Australian musician and media executive

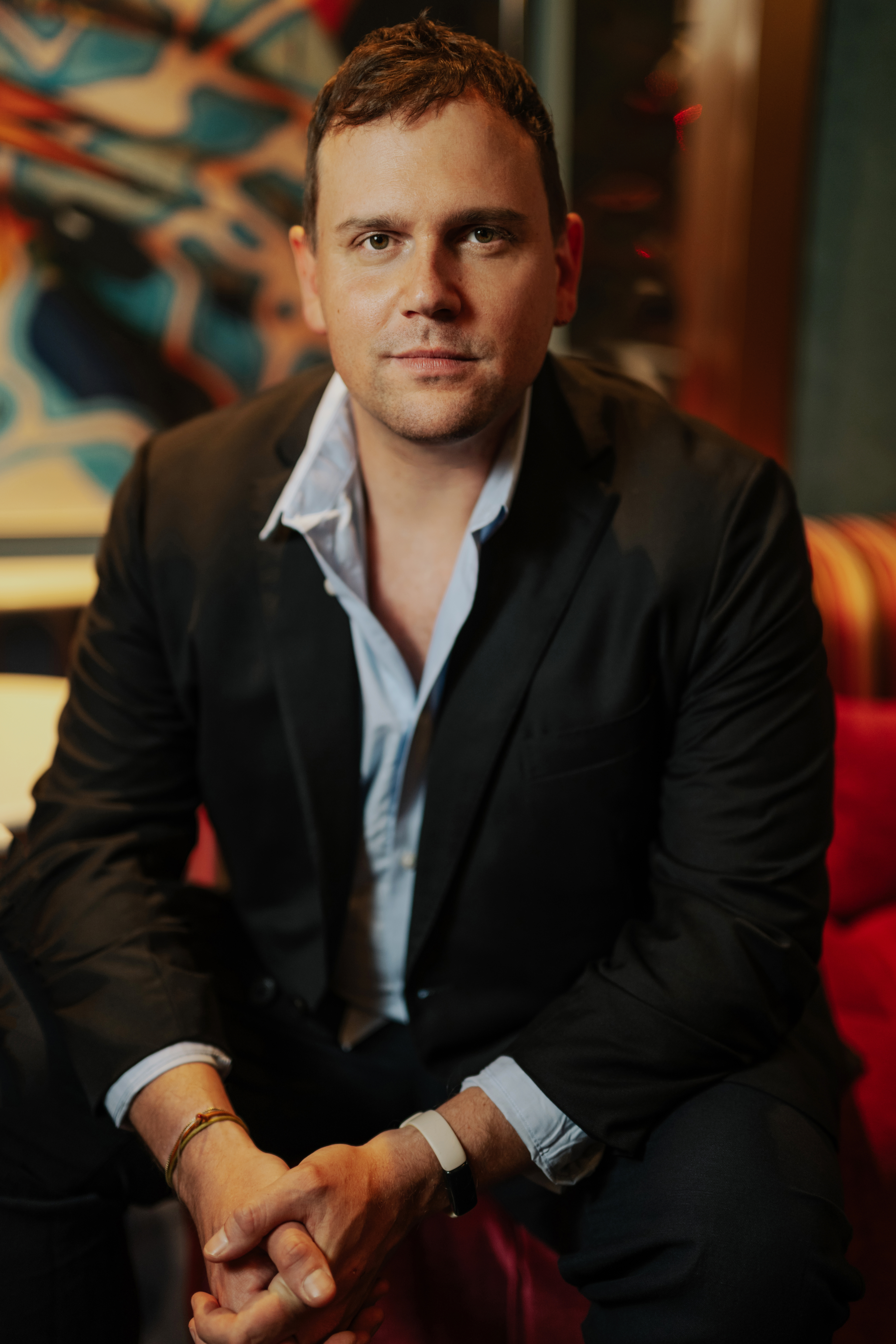
- Josh Simons in 2024
- Born: Joshua Timothy Simons; 27 October 1990 (age 36); England
- Occupations: Musician; technology founder; media executive
- Known for: Frontman of Buchanan (2009–2019), co-founder of Vampr, CEO of Vinyl Group
- Website: www.joshsimons.us

Joshua Timothy Simons (born 27 October 1990) is a musician, producer, technology founder, and media executive. He is the chief executive officer of the ASX-listed music and digital media company Vinyl Group and the co-founder of musician networking platform Vampr, having previously served as the frontman of the indie rock band Buchanan.

== Early life and education ==
Joshua Timothy Simons was born on 27 October 1990 in England. After moving to Australia, he obtained dual British and Australian citizenship.

He is a graduate of Swinburne University of Technology in Melbourne, having studied for his Bachelor of Business online.

== Career ==
=== Film ===
In 2008, Simons co-wrote (with Finn Stewart), produced, and directed an independent feature film, titled The Vapour Boys, which was released in 2009.

=== Music ===
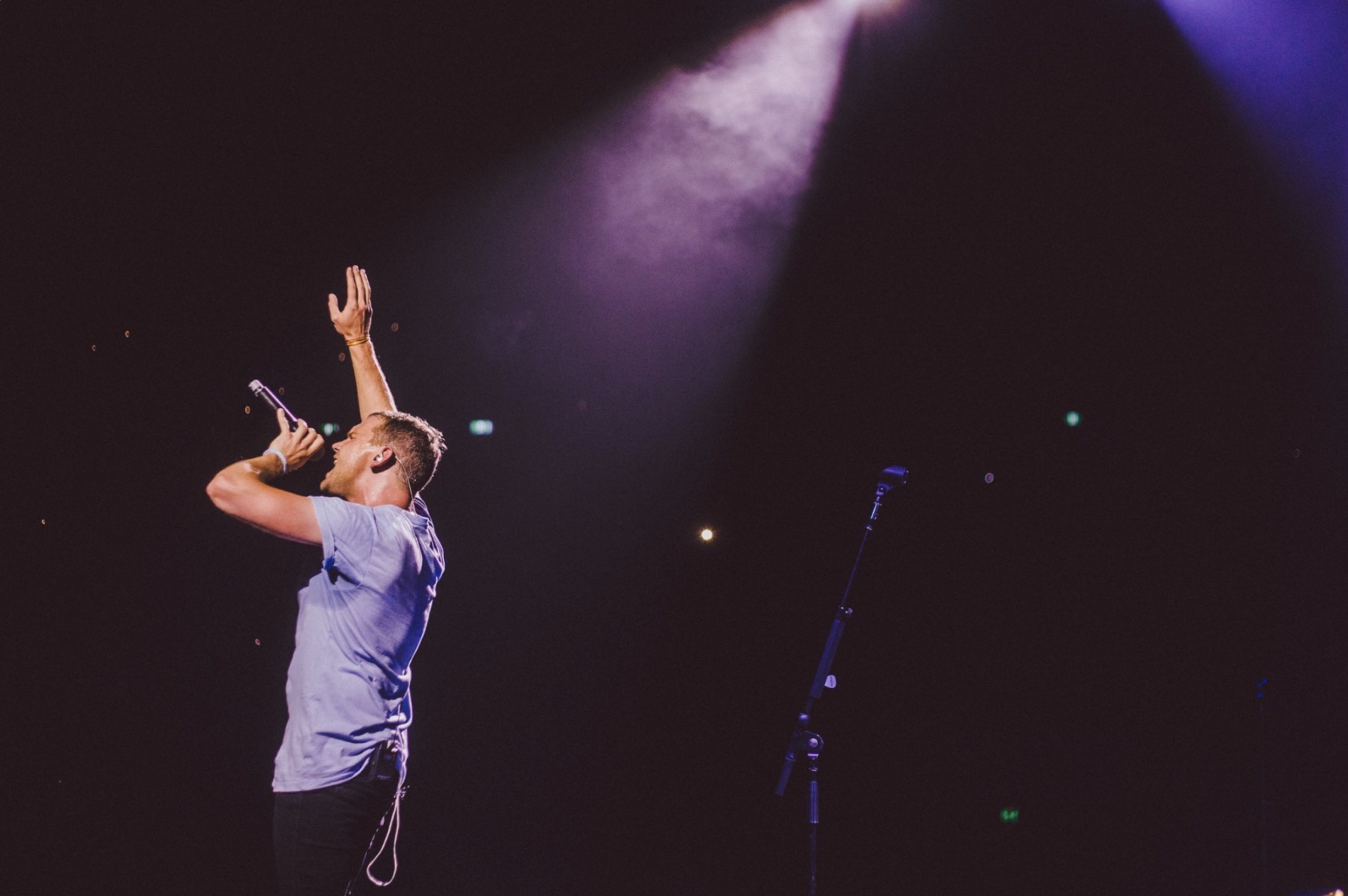
Simons performing at the Rod Laver Arena, Melbourne, 2016

Simons began his career in the Australian music industry as a songwriter and performer, forming Buchanan in 2009. As the band's frontman, he performed on its debut studio album, Human Spring, released in May 2013. Buchanan later released a second studio album, Pressure in an Empty Space, in 2016, before concluding the project with the mixtape The Crayon Collection in 2019. He later related that he had cleaned toilets and mowed lawns to pay for studio time to make an album.

Following Buchanan's first album, Simons moved to London, but, without an agent or bandmates and through lack of familiarity with the local music industry there, did not achieve success: "I sort of grinded away for about 12 months". He was treated for cancer there, and also met and wrote a song with Australian singer and actor Troye Sivan. While in London, he developed the idea for Vampr, which had a small pre-launch in France. The idea of a social-professional network for musicians arose due to the difficulty of breaking into the industry.

Buchanan later supported Keith Urban and Carrie Underwood during the Australian leg of Urban's Ripcord World Tour in 2016. That year, Simons also co-wrote Alfie Arcuri's song "Careless Game" with Troye Sivan. In 2017, Simons co-wrote "I'm Fine", a track by Cyhi the Prynce featuring Travis Scott and executive produced by Kanye West, from the album No Dope on Sundays.

Simons performing at Accor Stadium, Sydney, as part of Coldplay's Music of the Spheres World Tour

Simons later worked as a producer and touring musician, co-producing Emmanuel Kelly's song "My Sky" in early 2024 and performing as a guitarist in Kelly's band during the Australian leg of Coldplay's Music of the Spheres World Tour later that year.

=== Business ===
In 2015, Simons co-founded Vampr with Barry Palmer, guitarist for Hunters & Collectors, as a digital platform for musical collaboration. Simons said that the difficulty of building professional connections during his music career, while working other jobs to finance recording and touring, motivated him to create Vampr. After a period in London, he returned to Australia to develop the platform with Palmer.

Simons moved to Los Angeles to establish Vampr's headquarters and operations in the United States, where he served as Vampr's chief executive officer. In February 2023, the music credits platform Jaxsta announced an agreement to acquire Vampr. At the time the agreement was announced, Vampr had approximately 1.3 million users. Following completion of the acquisition, Simons joined Jaxsta's executive team and was appointed chief executive officer in June 2023.

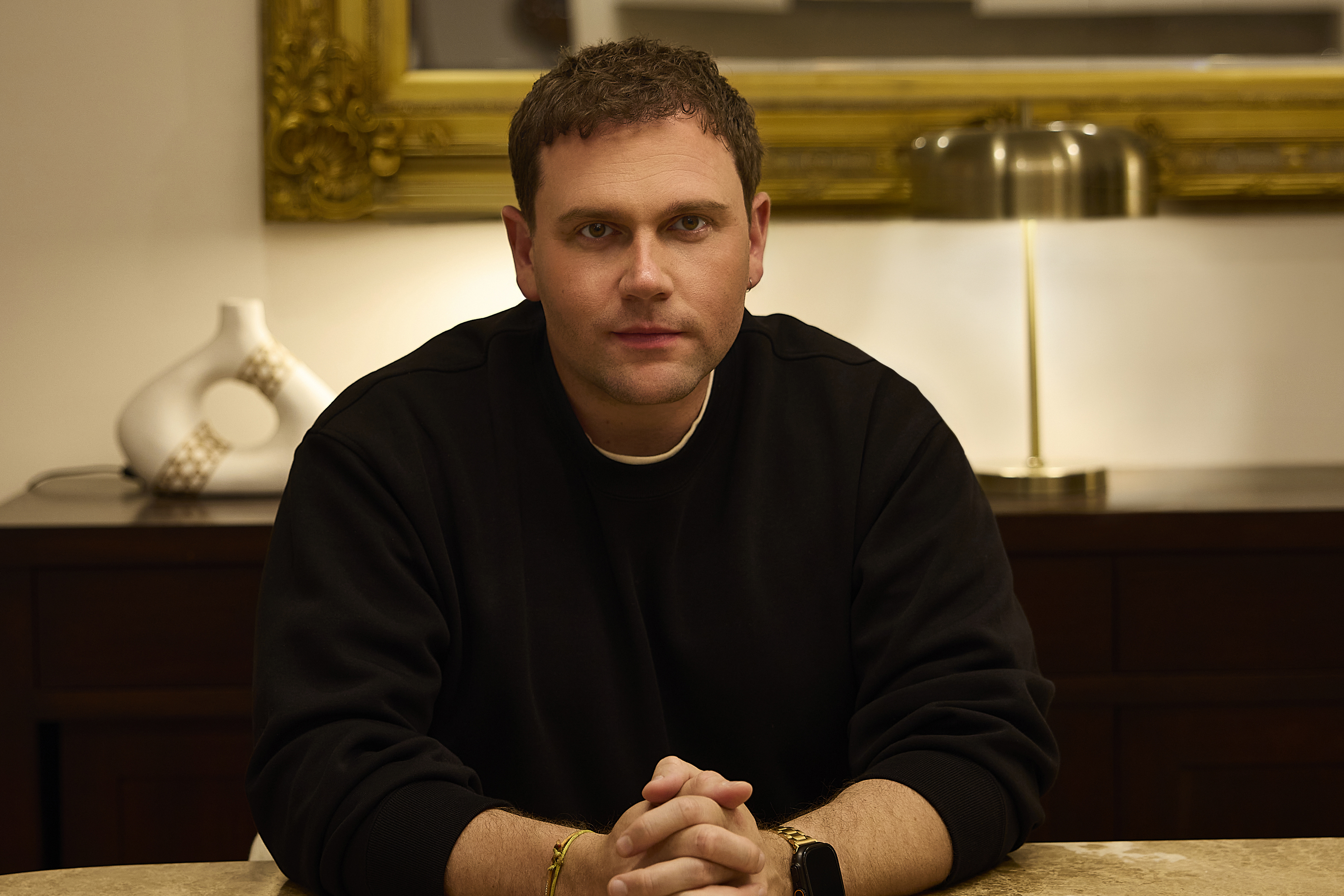
Simons in 2026

The company rebranded as Vinyl Group in December 2023. As CEO, Simons led the company's expansion into digital media through acquisitions including The Brag Media (publisher of Rolling Stone Australia / New Zealand), Mediaweek, the digital publishing assets of Val Morgan and Pedestrian Group between 2024 and 2026. As of October 2024 the Vinyl Group is the only music company listed on the Australian Stock Exchange. In an interview with NewsWire, he said that his aim was to "connect a thousand of the leading brands in the world with 100 million creators and a billion fans in a mutually reinforcing creator and fan ecosystem", having experienced what it was like to be a struggling musician himself.

In July 2026, Simons wrote about the concept of "adaptive media", which has its roots in "trust, context and cultural authority", and which exceeds the limitations of legacy media and social media.

In July 2026, Simons publicly accused the media trade publication Mumbrella of inaccurate reporting, unsupported speculation, and personal attacks following a series of articles questioning Vinyl Group's strategy, financial position, and his leadership. Mumbrella said it stood by its reporting. Simons specifically refuted the claim that an article in Concrete Playground had been written by AI. He complained to the Australian Press Council; however, they would not consider the complaint because Mumbrella is not a member.

== Other activities ==
In September 2015, Simons delivered a TEDx talk at Macquarie University alongside a performance of new music from his band Buchanan.

In February 2023, Simons was invited to be a guest lecturer at UCLA Herb Alpert School of Music to discuss music industry entrepreneurship.

In March 2025, Simons spoke at SXSW in Austin, Texas, appearing on the panel "Crafting a Transparent Future for Music Rightsholders", which examined transparency, rights data and technology in the music industry. The previous year, he also served as a judge for the SXSW Sydney Pitch competition.

He was a keynote speaker at BIGSOUND in 2024 and opening panelist in 2025 alongside Warner Music Australia President Dan Rosen, UNIFIED Music Group Founder & CEO Jaddan Comerford, and ARIA Charts CEO Annabelle Herd.

== Recognition and awards ==
In 2020, Simons received the Reader's Choice award at The Music Network's ‘30 Under 30’ awards for his work with Vampr.

In 2022, Vampr was included by Fast Company on its list of innovative music companies.

In 2024, Simons won the Digital Disruptor category at both the Melbourne and Australian Young Entrepreneur Awards.

In March 2025, Simons was listed at no. 41 of "Australia's Top 100 Young Entrepreneurs" by Business News Australia. Later that year, he was a finalist for the Technology Innovation Impact Award in the Swinburne University Alumni Impact Awards.

== Personal life ==
Simons lived in London for some time while he was a musician, returning to Australia after becoming ill.

Simons and his wife Tatiana lived for some years in the United States, where he became a citizen in 2021, before returning to Australia, and moving into a home in the Melbourne suburb of Patterson Lakes. They later moved to a new home in the nearby suburb of Carrum in May 2025.

== Selected works ==
=== Solo credits ===
List of solo credits, showing year, song, artist, album and role
Year	Work	Artist	Album	Role	Ref.
2016	"Careless Game"	Alfie Arcuri	Zenith	Co-writer	
2017	"I'm Fine (feat. Travis Scott)"	Cyhi the Prynce	No Dope on Sundays	Co-writer · Producer	
2018	"Blue Eyes White Dragon Flow"	Tre Capital	Hero	Executive producer (Album) · Co-producer · Mixer	
2018	"All Night"	Allan Kingdom	Peanut Butter Prince	Co-writer	
2018	"Don't Wait"	Allan Kingdom	Peanut Butter Prince	Co-writer	
2018	"Fall For You"	Allan Kingdom	Peanut Butter Prince	Co-writer	
2018	"Stand By You"	EveryOneBand	—	Backing Vocals · Piano	
2018	"Church of the Lonely"	Cobi	Songs From the Ashes, Pt. 2	Co-writer	
2018	"Basic"	King IV	—	Co-writer · Co-producer	
2019	"Medicine"	Jenny Queen	Baby It Was Real and We Were the Best	Co-writer	
2019	Film Score	Latter Day Jew	—	Writer · Music producer	
2024	"My Sky"	Emmanuel Kelly	No Zodiac - EP	Executive producer (Album) · Co-producer · Co-writer	
