= Buchanan (band) =

Australian musical group

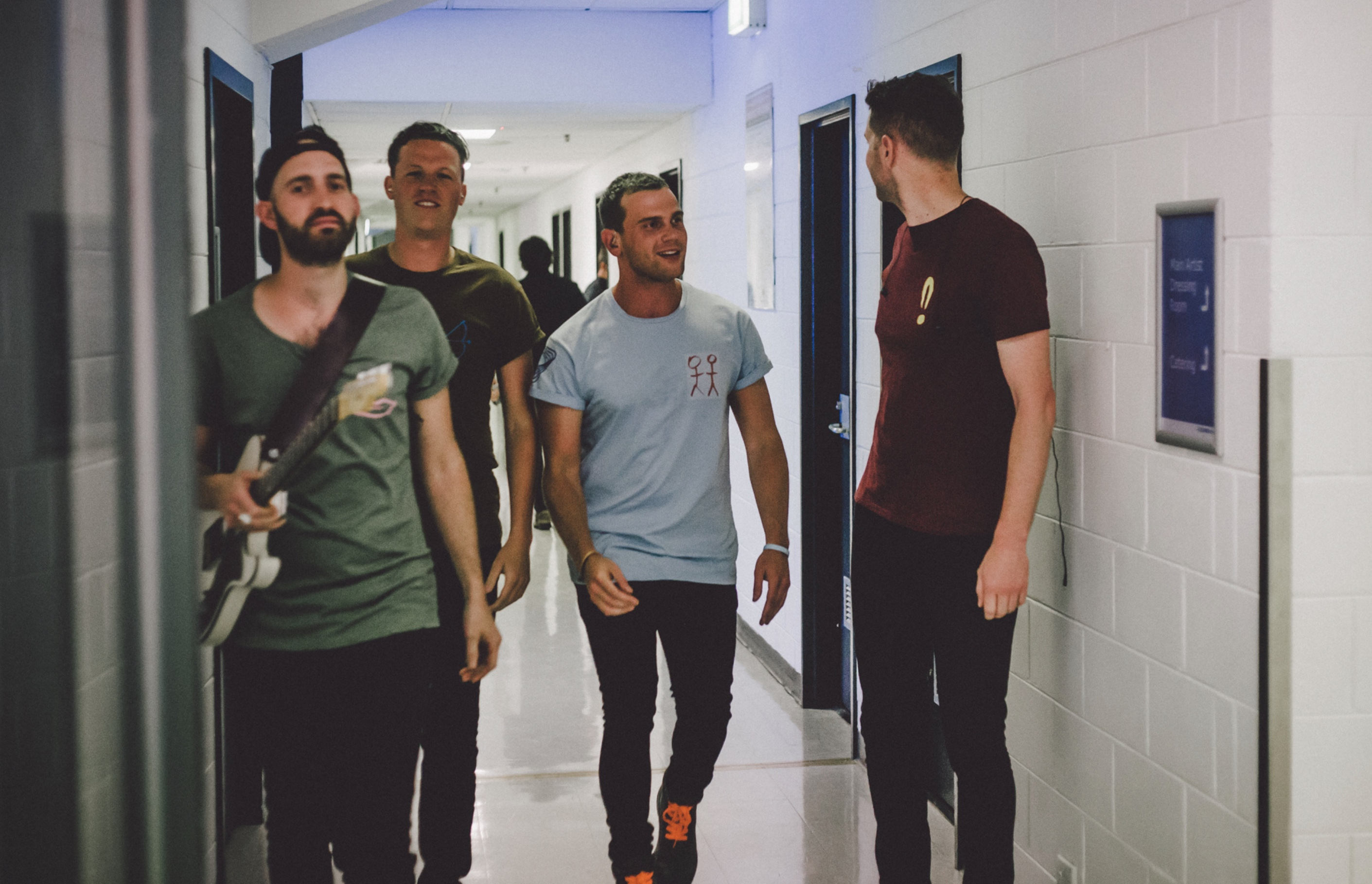

Background information
- Origin: Melbourne, Victoria, Australia
- Genres: Alternative rock, indie rock
- Years active: 2009–2019
- Labels: Independent, Inertia
- Past members: Josh Simons
- Website: www.buchananband.com

Buchanan were an Australian indie rock band formed in late 2009, the project of Josh Simons in collaboration with friends, including core member Jon Bara. Having risen to fame in 2010 after being featured on Triple J Unearthed, Buchanan spent periods in Melbourne, London, and Los Angeles, before retiring in 2019, on its tenth anniversary. They released two studio albums: Human Spring (2013) and Pressure in an Empty Space (2016), as well as three EPs. Simons went on to forge a career in business, founding the musician networking platform Vampr.

== Career ==
=== 2009–2012: Early years and No Photo - EP ===
Cover art of Buchanan's No Photo - EP

Buchanan was founded in Melbourne, Australia, by vocalist Josh Simons. Jon Bara was a core member in the early years.

They recorded their debut record The Safety Beach E.P. in April 2010. Featuring production by Tim Cross (former Mike Oldfield collaborator) the collection of demos was released on iTunes in May 2010. The band were shortly after invited to showcase for several record labels. Deciding to steel themselves and avoid hasty commitment, the band headed back to the studio to develop more material and record the follow-up.

Triple J debuted "Mr Keeperman" on Australian national radio on 19 September 2010. The band would go on to be featured on the Triple J Unearthed page and podcast.

In November 2010, the band released a single called "Teachers" independently via TuneCore. The single was added to high rotation on Triple J and gained a five out of five star rating from Richard Kingsmill and multiple additions to The Hype Machine.

In early 2011, the band played their first full electric shows in Sydney and Melbourne, performing alongside Gypsy and the Cat, Kimbra, Georgia Fair and Alpine. In February 2011 the band won the Triple J Unearthed competition and were invited to play the Laneway Festival in Melbourne, playing alongside Foals, Two Door Cinema Club, Cut Copy, and Gotye.

On 29 April 2011, the band released their first mass-produced physical record, No Photo - EP. Distributed via Inertia Records, Zoo Weekly gave the release four stars, comparing the songs to "Phoenix, with the emotional gravitas of Mumford & Sons and the instrumental dexterity of Sigur Rós." MX newspaper gave the release three and a half stars describing the music as "considered indie pop." The band held residency throughout the month of release at Northcote Social Club as well as supporting Tim & Jean to promote the release.

In June 2011, Buchanan embarked on their first national tour in support of second single "Mr Keeperman", playing shows in Adelaide, Sydney and Melbourne including supports with Jinja Safari, Trial Kennedy and Papa Vs Pretty. To promote the tour, the band appeared live on Triple J, Sea FM, Star FM, Joy FM, Channel 31 and on BalconyTV to perform acoustically. On 23 August 2011 the band's single "Mr Keeperman" debuted at number six on the Australian AMRAP community radio charts after being released to air as a single.

=== 2012–2014: Human Spring ===
Cover art of Buchanan's debut album, Human Spring

In March 2012, the band released single "Run Faster" ahead of their debut album. In May 2012, the song was added to rotation on Austereo's Radar Radio. In July 2012, Buchanan won Austereo's Radar Unsigned Find competition, marking the band as the first to be recognised nationally in unsigned competitions from both Triple J and Austereo. In August 2012, the song was added to high rotation on Triple J. The song spent nine consecutive weeks in the AIR Charts, reaching number 3 on the 100% Independent Radio Charts and number 12 on the Independent Label Radio Charts. The song was the 99th most played song on Triple J in 2012.

In October 2012, the band announced on their social media pages that they were embarking on a national tour of Australia throughout November and December. To coincide with the tour, the band offered a free download of a new B-side from their forthcoming debut album. The track, "When the Sun Comes Round Again", was made available for free from the band's official site.

In April 2013, the band announced their debut studio album, Human Spring, would go on sale in Australia and New Zealand on 10 May 2013. The album, released under Simons' own label Raw Imagination People Expect, received positive reviews. Tone Deaf gave the album 9/10 calling it a "tremendous debut" while Zoo Weekly gave the album an 8/10. The album was produced by Catherine Marks with additional production by frequent collaborator Tim Cross. It was recorded at various studios in Australia and the UK over the past 18 months. Andy Baldwin was hired to mix the record with the band choosing to master the album at Abbey Road with Geoff Pesche. The band released the title track, "Human Spring", on 12 April as the second single off the album. Triple J added the single to high rotation immediately. The song reached number 10 on the AIR 100% Independent Radio Charts where it spent three weeks.

In June 2013, the band performed live on Triple J for Like a Version, performing a cover of Frank Ocean's "Thinkin Bout You". In July, the band released a new single from the album, "Par Avion", to coincide with a national headline tour of Australia. The band was also announced as part of the BIGSOUND Festival lineup for September 2013. The music video for "Par Avion" premiered on Yahoo! Music following the band's set at BIGSOUND.

In August 2013, both the band's single and album of the same name, "Human Spring", debuted at number 10 on the FMQB Sub-modern radio charts in North America, peaking at number 8. In April 2014 the band announced the release of the album worldwide, putting out a single from the album every three weeks in the lead up to its release. "Temperamentally" hit number 30 on the iTunes US Alternative charts following the release of the single's lyric video online. The album was made available for purchase worldwide on 9 July 2014.

=== 2014–2016: Pressure in an Empty Space ===
Cover art of Buchanan's sophomore album, Pressure in an Empty Space

The band relocated to London to commence work on their second studio album with producer Simon Duffy. They released a video on social media for a new single called "Coming Down" on 21 July 2014. The track received radio and club airplay in the United Kingdom and Ibiza, debuting at No. 29 on the Music Week Commercial Pop Charts. The song was also nominated as a semi-finalist in the 2014 International Songwriting Competition.

On 26 September 2015 the band headlined the TEDx Macquarie University conference, which was streamed live worldwide, debuting several tracks from the new album. On 27 October, Simons' birthday, the band put up a post on social media revealing the album would be called Pressure in an Empty Space.

On 16 November 2015 the band released an EP, Living a Lie, which was a precursor to the then upcoming second studio album. A national tour of Australia in support of the release was also announced for February 2016. Apple Music promoted several promotional videos from the EP on the homepage of its service worldwide.

Following the tour, the band released two further singles from the album, title track "Pressure in an Empty Space" and "Learn to Love Again", hinting at an April release date during an appearance on SYN FM. The release date was later confirmed to be 29 April. The title track was later shortlisted in the Vanda & Young Global Songwriting Competition.

On the week of the album release FasterLouder premiered a videoclip for the song "Stop!" The album debuted at 42 on the iTunes Australia charts and has taken the band past the million units streamed worldwide milestone. The album was mastered at Metropolis Studios in West London by John Davis and received favourable reviews from music publications. The album follows Simons during the compounding experiences of the breakdown of a committed relationship whilst dealing with an obscure form of cancer in 2014, which Tone Deaf described as "a stunning and incredibly moving piece of work."

The band premiered the video for the title track "Pressure in an Empty Space" on a new social-professional network for musicians called Vampr. Simons developed the app in collaboration with Hunters & Collectors' guitarist Barry Palmer, and was released in May 2016.

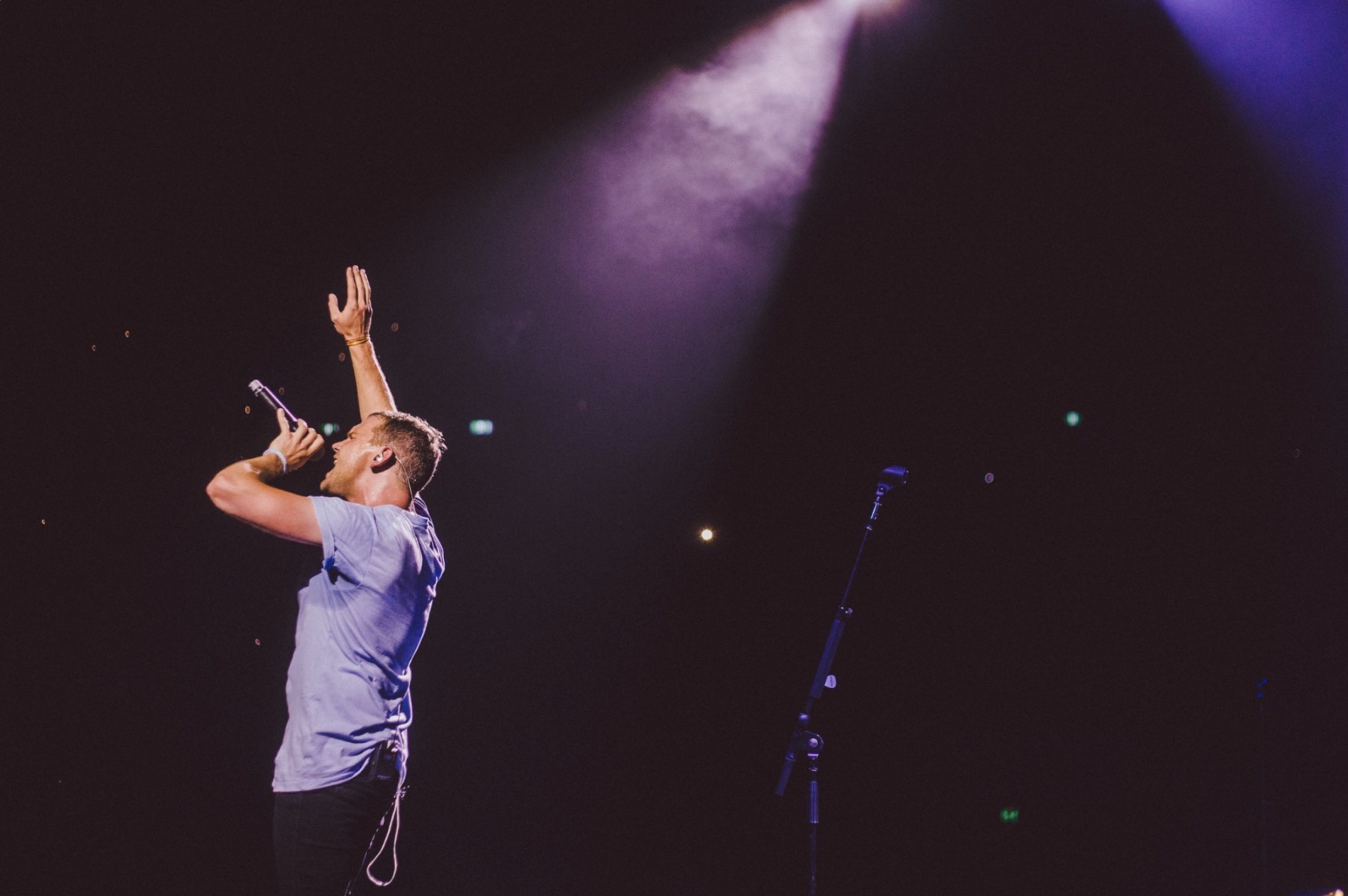
Buchanan (Joshua Simons) performing at Rod Laver Arena in 2016

In July 2016, Buchanan were announced as an opening act for the Australian leg of Keith Urban's ripCORD World Tour, alongside Carrie Underwood.

In 2016, Simons co-wrote The Voice Australia winner Alfie Arcuri's song "Careless Game" with Troye Sivan. The song appeared on Arcuri's album Zenith, which reached number five on the ARIA Albums Chart.

On 28 October 2016 the band released their first live album, Alive, exclusively on Apple Music. The album includes 13 tracks recorded during their Living a Lie tour.

=== 2016–2019: The Crayon Collection and other musical work ===
Cover art of Buchanan's final release, The Crayon Collection mixtape

Simons began working on new material in Los Angeles with producer Anthony Kilhoffer. The first track from these sessions, "The Beep Test", was released on 25 November 2016. Its music video, filmed during the ripCORD World Tour, premiered on theMusic.com.au in February 2017.

On 14 December 2016, Buchanan became the first band to perform at the International Convention Centre Sydney as part of the tour.

During this period, Simons also worked as a songwriter and producer for other artists. He co-wrote and co-produced "I'm Fine", featuring Travis Scott, from Cyhi the Prynce's 2017 album No Dope on Sundays. The album reached number 65 on the Billboard 200 and number 30 on the Top R&B/Hip-Hop Albums chart.

In 2018, Simons co-produced and mixed Tre Capital's single "Blue Eyes White Dragon Flow", which premiered through Complex. He also received songwriting credits on releases by Allan Kingdom and Cobi.

Buchanan released its first single in two years, "Breathe", on 23 November 2018. The song featured guest vocals by Tre Capital and Georgia Mae.

On 11 January 2019, the band announced its retirement and the release of a final mixtape, The Crayon Collection, on 25 January 2019. The release included material recorded during different periods of the band's career. The announcement was accompanied by the single "An Uncommon Experience" and a retrospective video. The mixtape reached number 79 on the Australian iTunes chart.

Later in 2019, Simons received a songwriting credit on Jenny Queen's album Baby It Was Real and We Were the Best and composed the score for the documentary Latter Day Jew.

After Buchanan's retirement, Simons continued to work as a songwriter, producer and musician, including co-producing Emmanuel Kelly's 2024 single "My Sky", executive-producing Kelly's No Zodiac EP and performing as a guest guitarist during the Australian leg of Coldplay's Music of the Spheres World Tour.

== Discography ==
=== Studio albums ===
- Human Spring (2013)
1. Act Natural
2. Par Avion
3. The Punch
4. Temptation
5. For Tonight We Rest (Leaves)
6. Run Faster
7. Human Spring
8. Temperamentally
9. Sit It Out
10. The Few
11. An All Clear?
- Pressure in an Empty Space (2016)
1. Only Us
2. Learn to Love Again
3. Coming Down
4. Stop!
5. Pressure in an Empty Space
6. I Don't Want to Die
7. All That Remains
8. Pleasure
9. Uncuff Me

=== Mixtapes ===
- The Crayon Collection (2019)
1. Breathe
2. Hold Off
3. An Uncommon Experience
4. The Beep Test

=== Live albums ===
- Alive (2016)
1. Only Us (Live)
2. Learn to Love Again (Live)
3. Run Faster (Live)
4. Temperamentally/Teachers (Live)
5. Mr Keeperman (Live)
6. Aisles (Live)
7. Safety Beach (Live)
8. When the Sun Comes Round Again (Live)
9. Pressure in an Empty Space (Live)
10. Human Spring (Live)
11. Living a Lie (Live)
12. All That Remains (Live)
13. Coming Down (Live)

=== EPs ===
- The Safety Beach E.P. (2010)
1. Mr Keeperman
2. Waiting
3. Safety Beach
4. Son
- No Photo - EP (2011)
1. Moon
2. Mr Keeperman
3. Waiting
4. Teachers
5. Aisles
6. Waiting on a Sound (Bonus Track)
- Living a Lie (2015)
1. Living a Lie
2. Galileo
3. Coming Down (Acoustic)

=== Singles ===
Title	Year	Album
"Teachers"	2010	No Photo - EP
"Mr Keeperman"	2011	No Photo - EP
"Run Faster"	2012	Human Spring
"When the Sun Comes Round Again"	2012	Non-album single
"Human Spring"	2013	Human Spring
"Par Avion"	2013	Human Spring
"Temperamentally"	2014	Human Spring
"Coming Down"	2014	Pressure in an Empty Space
"Living a Lie"	2015	Living a Lie (EP)
"Pressure in an Empty Space"	2016	Pressure in an Empty Space
"Learn to Love Again"	2016	Pressure in an Empty Space
"Stop!"	2016	Pressure in an Empty Space
"The Beep Test"	2016	The Crayon Collection (Mixtape)
"Breathe"	2018	The Crayon Collection (Mixtape)
"An Uncommon Experience"	2019	The Crayon Collection (Mixtape)

== Awards and nominations ==
Year	Nominee / work	Award	Result
2011	"Teachers"	Triple J Unearthed Competition	Won
2012	"Run Faster"	Austereo's Radar Unsigned Find Competition	Won
2014	"Coming Down"	International Songwriting Competition	Nominated
2016	"Pressure in an Empty Space"	Vanda & Young Global Songwriting Competition	Nominated
