= Peter McCracken =

Peter McCracken may refer to:

- Pete McCracken, Australian composer, guitarist and singer-songwriter
- Peter McCracken (footballer, born 1883) (1883–1936), Australian rules footballer for St Kilda
- Peter McCracken (footballer, born 1949), Australian rules footballer for South Melbourne
- Peter McCracken (footballer, born 1869) (1872–1948), Scottish footballer for Chesterfield Town, Middlesbrough and Nottingham Forest

== See also ==
- Peter McCrackan (1844–1928), Australian politician
