= Peter Jones (drummer) =

Australian musician (1963–2012)

- Born: Peter Robert Jones; 21 April 1963; Liverpool, Lancashire, England
- Died: 18 May 2012 (aged 49) Melbourne, Victoria, Australia
- Genres: Rock, jazz
- Occupation: Drummer
- Years active: 1983–2012
- Formerly of: Harem Scarem; Vince Jones; The Feet; Kate Ceberano's Septet; Crowded House; Deadstar

Peter Robert Jones (21 April 1963 – 18 May 2012) was an English-born Australian musician. He replaced Paul Hester on drums for Crowded House in mid-1994. After the band split up in June 1996, he played in Deadstar with Caroline Kennedy and Nick Seymour, but did not return to Crowded House when they re-formed in 2006 about a year after Hester's death. Jones worked as a secondary teacher in Melbourne and on 18 May 2012, he died from brain cancer, aged 49.

== Biography ==
Peter Robert Jones was born on 21 April 1963 in Liverpool. His parents were Barrie and Joan Jones (died 2010); his siblings were Phil and Christine. The family arrived in Australia in 1966 and settled in the Melbourne suburb of Doncaster. By the age of 13 years Peter started learning to play drums as Phil was already playing guitar. For secondary education he attended Templestowe Technical College, which had a passionate music teacher Gordon Pendleton who prepared him for a jazz course at Victorian College of the Arts in 1982. In 1983 Jones was the drummer for Vince Jones (no relation), the Australian jazz musician, and appears on the latter's second album, Spell, which had appeared by November.

In 1984, he played in a Melbourne pub band called The Feet, with Wayne Drury (vocals and bass), Tom Roberts (guitar), Tom Hoy (alto saxophone), Peter Orr and Amanda Bathgate (tenor sax). During 1984 Peter also drummed with the band Transwaste, formerly named Recent Theft. Led by Jamie Fielding (keyboard), Michael Sheridan (guitar), Gavan Dunn (Sax) and James Boddington (Bass) the band was making original music influenced by industrial and independent rock groups. In February 1985 he joined Harem Scarem, a Melbourne-based blues rock group, with Christopher Marshall on lead vocals; his brother, Charles Marshall on bass guitar; Kurt Lindtner on harmonica; David Moll on guitar; and Glen Sheldon on guitar. In September the group reorganised with Moll replaced by Barry Palmer on lead guitar; Lindtner replaced by Chris Wilson on harmonica and saxophone (both ex-Sole Twisters); and Sheldon and Charles Marshall swapped their instruments. Australian musicologist, Ian McFarlane, described the new ensemble: "Few alternative bands of the day could ever hope to match that line-up for muscular bravado and sheer instrumental firepower".

Harem Scarem issued their first studio album, Pilgrim's Progress, in December 1986 on Au Go Go Records. McFarlane noted that it was a "classic" which had received "great critical acclaim". Trevor Block of Mess+Noise described the re-issue version from 2008 as a "steaming chunk of urban blues from the Yarra delta". Their second album, Lo & Behold, appeared in December 1988 on Citadel Records. McFarlane felt it was "another strong release with a more varied approach (rock, blues and soul influences mixed with The Band-like country elements)". As a member of Harem Scarem Jones co-wrote 12 of their tracks including three singles, "Hard Rain" (September 1986), "Miracle Mile" (June 1987) and "Long Time Between Drinks" (December 1988). The group disbanded in 1989.

He was also in Stove Top, and recorded with rock band, Lucy's Crown, on their debut album. Jones played with Ross Hannaford, Rowland S. Howard, Lisa Miller, Kate Ceberano, Tinpan Orange, Freakpower (which included Nique Needles, Nick Barker and Stu Thomas)and David Hosking.

In mid-1994 Jones was asked to join Crowded House to replace founding drummer, Paul Hester. The group were touring the United States and had temporarily used tour mate's Sheryl Crow's drummer Wally Ingram, before Jones could arrive. He remained with the group until they disbanded in June 1996. He returned as a guest musician for their Farewell to the World concert in November that year. Jones' performance was recorded and appears on the group's live album of the concert, Farewell to the World (November 2006). On the related DVD, founding lead vocalist, Neil Finn, mentions that Jones was a school teacher.

In August 1995 while still a member of Crowded House, Jones formed a pop music side project, Deadstar, with former Harem Scarem bandmate, Barry Palmer on guitar and bass guitar (also in Hunters & Collectors), and Caroline Kennedy (ex-Plums) on lead vocals. They issued their debut self-titled album in October, most of the tracks were co-written by the three band members. After Crowded House had disbanded in November of the following year, Deadstar recruited Nick Seymour on bass guitar. The group issued two more studio albums, Milk (August 1997) and Somewhere Over the Radio (September 1999), until they disbanded in 2001.

After Deadstar Jones worked as a session musician for various groups including Ross Hannaford's Reggaebites (2002); as a producer he worked on albums by Stephen Cummings (Firecracker, 3 February 2003; Close Ups, 16 August 2000), Tess McKenna (Boom Bam, 2003), and Rebecca Barnard (Fortified, 2006).

After 1999, Jones was at Roxburgh College, initially as a drum instructor and then as a classroom teacher. In March 2011, Jones was diagnosed with brain cancer. He died from the disease on 18 May 2012 in Melbourne, aged 49.
