= Barry Palmer (musician) =

Australian guitarist, songwriter, and record producer

Barry Palmer is an Australian musician, songwriter, and record producer. He was a member of various bands, including Hunters & Collectors. He is also known for his tech entrepreneurship, in particular Weyo, which creates apps for children, and musicians' networking app Vampr, which he co-founded with Josh Simons.

== Career ==
=== Music ===
Barry Palmer began playing alongside his brother Craig Palmer and bluesman Chris Wilson in popular R&B band The Sole Twisters. He came to prominence as guitarist and songwriter for indie rock band Harem Scarem and Crown of Thorns, joining Hunters & Collectors in 1989.

In 2005 he was the subject of a documentary series The Hit Game on ABC Television, which showed him producing and developing four unsigned artists: Deepface; Belinda-Lee Reid (ex-Lash); Vanessa Morefea; and the Wolfgramm sisters.

Palmer toured the world and Australia for many years with Hunters & Collectors. In 2005 the band was inducted into the ARIA Hall of Fame. While still in Hunters & Collectors, Palmer formed Deadstar with Caroline Kennedy, From their first indie hits, such as "Going Down" and "Don't It Get You Down", to later pop songs like "Deeperwater" and "Run Baby Run", the band toured Australia and the UK until disbanding in 2001.

Hunters & Collectors reformed in 2013 for the AFL Grand Final performance, followed by a run of shows around Australia in 2014 that saw the band also play support slots with Bruce Springsteen and The Rolling Stones.

==== Production and collaborations ====
During this time Palmer wrote and sometimes produced songs with many other artists – "Cry" with The Mavis's (gold sales and APRA most performed song of the year), "Rip It Up" with 28 Days (gold), "Take Me Away" with Lash (lead track for US movie Freaky Friday with the soundtrack selling in excess of 500,000), "Love Comes Easy" with Vika and Linda (first single from Princess Tabu), "Home Again" and many others with old songwriting partner Mark Seymour (produced first solo album, King Without A Clue) and a swag of other songs with artists as diverse as Michael Spiby of The Badloves, Dan Brodie, Tim Henwood of The Androids, Shihad, The Fauves, Amiel, Lisa Miller, The D4, Carly Binding, Luger Boa, and Dash and Will.

Palmer's Gigantic Studios opened in 2011, but this studio was later taken over by Jan Skubiszewski.

Palmer started his own 360º music production company and label, Gigantically Small, in 2008 and co-wrote with, produced, and worked with many Australian young musicians.

=== Tech companies ===
In 2012, Palmer co-founded, with his son Declan, a global tech start-up, Soundhalo. Soundhalo was a real-time live concert HD video delivery mobile application, launched with artists such as Alt-J and Thom Yorke's Atoms For Peace.

Palmer has since launched other tech start-ups, including Weyo, which he co-founded with Stuart Berwick in 2014. Weyo creates augmented reality apps for children such as The Wiggles - Fun Time with Faces in 2018 and Sesame Street Yourself in 2019.

In 2015, Palmer co-founded, with fellow musician Josh Simons, of Buchanan, a networking app for musicians, called Vampr. Vampr was acquired by ASX-listed Vinyl Group in June 2023.

== List of bands ==
- Sole Twisters (1983–1985)
- Harem Scarem (1985–1989)
- Crown of Thorns with Chris Wilson and Chris Rodgers (1987–89)
- Hunters and Collectors (1988–1998)
- Deadstar (1995–2001)
