= VMO =

VMO can refer to:

- Vlaamse Militanten Order (the Order of Flemish militants)
- Vastus medialis obliquus (a muscle)
- V_{MO}, maximum operating speed of an aircraft, see V speeds
- VMO, designation of observation squadrons of the US Marine Corps
- 'Views my own' – a disclaimer
- Vanishing mean oscillation in mathematics
- Visiting Medical Officer (VMO)
- Val Morgan Outdoor (an outdoor advertising division of Val Morgan)
