= Music community =

Subculture of a music genre

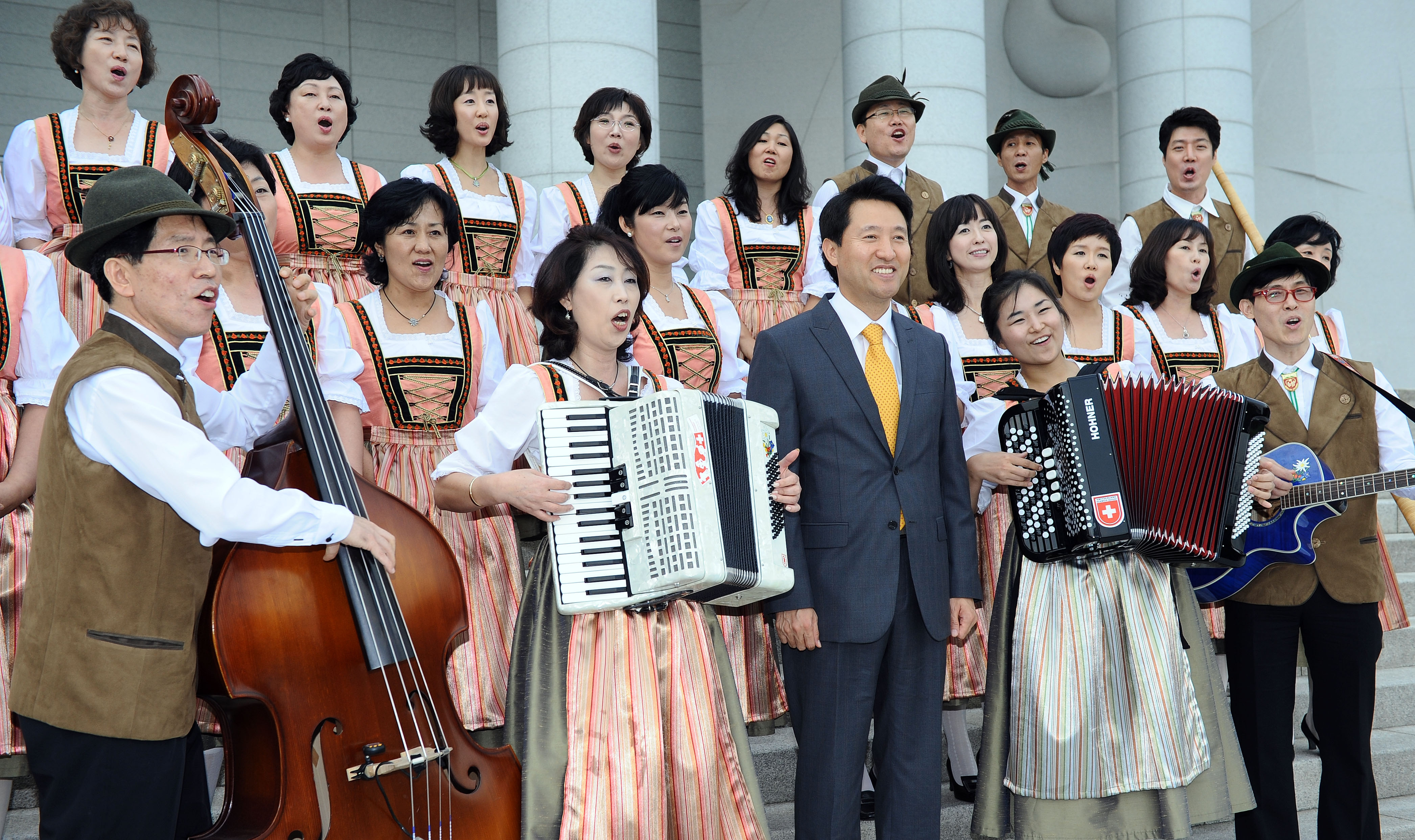
Korean community music group with Swiss-German costumes and instruments (2010)

A music community is a group of people involved in a given type of music. Typically such a community has an informal, supportive structure. In the past such groups have typically developed within a town or school, where the members can meet physically. The internet has made it possible for a more dispersed music community to use the web for communication, either via specialized websites or through broader social media. Ethnographic studies indicate that online music communities do not center around one website, but use a network of sites, including personal blogs, artist or publisher sites and social media.

== General ==
The musician and musicologist Mícheál Ó Súilleabháin has broadly defined a music community as "a group of interested participants who agree on the form and content of the music and its social contexts". A music community may be taken to mean a group of people with strong ties who often come together to play and talk about music, but a sense of community may also come from a national educational system that connects young people to their cultural heritage and traditions.

The concept of music communities is well-developed in ethnomusicology. A large part of this discipline consists of studies of groups of people who frequently exchange and communicate musical material.

Barry Shank, writing in 1994 of Rock and roll in Austin, Texas, used the word "subculture" to define the shifting meanings and membership of musical communities, or cultural spaces. Will Straw built on this work, replacing the term "subculture" by "scene". Straw saw a "scene" as relatively transient, while a music community is more stable. He wrote in 1991 that a music community engages in "an ongoing exploration of one or more musical idioms said to be rooted within a geographically specific historical heritage." Disputing Straw's characterization, later writers have pointed out that music communities may be mobile and transient.

Musical communities typically have very flexible structures, voluntary membership and people of a wide range of ages. They offer participants the opportunity to play different roles including creator, participant or observer. Conscious efforts may be made to involve disadvantaged members. Typically the group encourages diversity, and all members are committed to lifetime learning. When a music community is widespread, aspects of music-making such as repertoire and style may evolve and diverge.

== Types of music community ==
There are many types of music community. Women's music communities among the Ewe people of Ghana help create bonds and nurture cooperation between women who would otherwise be pulled apart by competition in their polygamist society. Irish immigrants to the United States were generally keen to assimilate and adopt a new ethnic identity as Americans, but a minority held onto their traditional culture and formed Irish traditional music communities in Boston, New York, Chicago and other cities. After over one hundred years these communities persisted. The primary reason seems to have simply been the entertainment value. Teachers may deliberately foster development of a music community within their school, which can assist students in reaching their full potential. Such teachers may build on the Suzuki method in the belief that cooperation in group classes plays an important role, and that competition is inappropriate. According to Mary Ann Froehlich, "Competition isolates, while cooperation creates community. ... Our goal is to build an inclusive music community."

Researchers have explored how a sense of musical community is developed through routine use of shared metaphors and symbols, and have demonstrated how particular social practices and institutions are sustained through development of musical communities.

== Online music communities ==
One of the early online music communities was established in 1996 by Oh Boy Records, a small independent record company. It took the form of a chat page on its website that let fans of John Prine exchange views and information. The website became the base of a specialized Prine music community. However, as Prine ceased performing while fighting cancer, and no new recordings were released, the community ran out of information to exchange and went into decline. Oh Boy eventually closed the chat page.

Another early online music community that was the subject of an ethnographic study was the Banjo Hangout, established in 2000. As of 2011 it had about 51,000 members and featured a large online learning center.

imeem, a social networking site with 28 million monthly visitors, was the first music community to provide ad-supported free online music streaming and downloading. Other sites such as Myspace followed with similar services. Specialized software has been developed to support online music communities.

Online communities have emerged for genres of folk music such as Blue Grass and Old Time. Cyber-ethnography using the framework of Étienne Wenger's social learning theory shows that sites like this may be considered a community of practice (CoP). The members of an online music community can publish, listen to and evaluate the music they have created, giving them a strong sense of membership. It provides a platform within which members can create a musical identity as well as one in which they can build social bonds. J. P. Williams, writing in 2006 in the Journal of Contemporary Ethnography, argued that the driving force behind online music communities is the interest of the participants in building their identities, despite the ostensible focus on making and sharing music.

A 2013 book notes that in Finland the Mikseri music portal, with about 140,000 registered users, helps people create, share and discuss their music in this sparsely populated country. This web-based community was the object of ethnographic studies in 2008 and 2009 based on theories of sociocultural learning. Members of Mikseri do not exclusively belong to that community, but may belong to other real-world or online communities. An analysis of event-related data from an online music community shows that events on that site often cause increased interest in a given artist, but propagation over links within digital social communities is also an important factor. An investigation of the music community of fans of Swedish indie music showed that they do not gather around one site, but interact with a network of sites including their own fan sites, Myspace, Last.fm, YouTube and so on.

Online discussion forums may provide some of the functions of virtual music communities. However, according to Mary McCarthy a music community should teach uninitiated listeners or musicians, and an online group cannot fill this role. Only a community of real people in a real place can provide the depth of contact, discussion, sharing and support that the novice musician requires for their development.

Vampr is a social network app for people in the music industry to discover, connect and build a community of other like-minded musicians and professionals. It currently has a userbase of over 1,000,000 users.

== See also ==
- Music industry

== Sources ==
- Brinner, Benjamin (1995-12-01). Knowing Music, Making Music: Javanese Gamelan and the Theory of Musical Competence and Interaction. University of Chicago Press. ISBN 978-0-226-07509-9.
- Burns, James M. (2009a). Female Voices from an Ewe Dance-drumming Community in Ghana: Our Music Has Become a Divine Spirit. Ashgate Publishing, Ltd. ISBN 978-0-7546-6495-6.
- Burns, Kelli S. (2009b). Celeb 2.0: How Social Media Foster Our Fascination with Popular Culture. ABC-CLIO. ISBN 978-0-313-35688-9.
- Colwell, Richard; Richardson, Carol (2002-04-18). The New Handbook of Research on Music Teaching and Learning: A Project of the Music Educators National Conference. Oxford University Press, USA. ISBN 978-0-19-513884-9.
- "Creative Commons Music Communities". Creative Commons Music.
- Denzin, Norman K. (2010-10-11). Studies in Symbolic Interaction. Emerald Group Publishing. ISBN 978-0-85724-361-4.
- Froehlich, Mary Ann (2004). 101 Ideas for Piano Group Class: Building an Inclusive Music Community for Students of All Ages and Abilities. Alfred Music. ISBN 978-1-4574-3885-1.
- Kibby, Marjorie D. (2006). "HOME ON THE PAGE A virtual place of music community". The Popular Music Studies Reader. Psychology Press. ISBN 978-0-415-30710-9.
- Laughey, Daniel (2006-01-04). Music and Youth Culture. Edinburgh University Press. ISBN 978-0-7486-2638-0.
- Nettl, Bruno (2005-11-10). The Study of Ethnomusicology: Thirty-one Issues and Concepts. University of Illinois Press. ISBN 978-0-252-09199-5.
- Nicholsen, Micheal D. (2007). "Auld Sod" and the New Turf: Entertainment, Nationalism, and Identity in the Irish Traditional Music Community of Chicago, 1868—1999. ISBN 978-0-549-40050-9.
- Rikandi, Inga (2010). Mapping the Common Ground: Philosophical Perspectives on Finnish Music Education. Helsinki: BTJ Finland Oy. ISBN 978-951-692-788-9.
- Smith, Sally K. Sommers (Summer 2001). "Traditional Music: Ceol Traidisiúnta: Irish Traditional Music in a Modern World". New Hibernia Review / Iris Éireannach Nua. 5 (2). University of St. Thomas (Center for Irish Studies): 111–125. doi:10.1353/nhr.2001.0036. JSTOR 20557723. S2CID 201777964.
- Tirado, Juan M.; Higuero, Daniel; Isaila, Florin; Carretero, Jesús (2011). "Analyzing the impact of events in an online music community". Proceedings of the 4th Workshop on Social Network Systems. New York: ACM. pp. 1–6. doi:10.1145/1989656.1989662. ISBN 978-1-4503-0728-4. S2CID 15114461.
- Veblen, Kari K.; Elliott, David J.; Messenger, Stephen J.; Silverman, Marissa (2013). Community Music Today. Rowman & Littlefield. ISBN 978-1-60709-319-0.
- Waldron, Janice (2009-12-01). "Exploring a virtual music community of practice: Informal music learning on the Internet". Journal of Music, Technology & Education. 2 (23). Intellect: 97–112. doi:10.1386/jmte.2.2-3.97_1.
- Waldron, Janice (December 2011). "Locating Narratives in Postmodern Spaces: A Cyber Ethnographic Field Study of Informal Music Learning in Online Community". Action, Criticism, and Theory for Music Education. 10 (2).
- Wolf, Mary Montgomery (2007). "Introduction". "We Accept You, One of Us?": Punk Rock, Community, and Individualism in an Uncertain Era, 1974—1985. The University of North Carolina at Chapel Hill University Libraries. p. 19. doi:10.17615/e26e-6m88.
