= Deadstar =

Australian pop rock band

- Origin: Melbourne, Australia
- Genres: Pop, rock
- Years active: 1995–2001
- Labels: White, Mushroom, Festival
- Past members: Peter Jones; Caroline Kennedy; Barry Palmer; Nick Seymour; Pete McCracken; Kalju Tonuma; Michael den Elzen; Anna Burley

Deadstar (styled as deadstar) were an Australian alternative rock band formed in August 1995 by Peter Jones (Crowded House) on drums and percussion; Caroline Kennedy on lead vocals and guitar; and Barry Palmer (Hunters & Collectors) on guitar and bass guitar. They released three studio albums, deadstar (October 1995), Milk (April 1997) and Somewhere Over the Radio (September 1999). Two singles reached the top 100 on the ARIA Singles Chart, "Run Baby Run" and "Deeper Water", both in 1999. The group were nominated for three ARIA Music Awards. The group disbanded in 2001.

== History ==
Deadstar were formed in August 1995 in Melbourne as a pop music band. Initially they were a side-project for Barry Palmer on guitar and bass guitar who was also in Hunters & Collectors and Peter Jones (of Crowded House) on drums. The pair invited Caroline Kennedy (ex-Plums) into the studio to write melodies and lyrics over tracks of guitar music on the score they had recorded for a proposed short film, The Baby Bath Massacre.

The group's first album, Deadstar, was issued in October 1995, it was produced by Palmer for the White Records label and distributed by Mushroom Records and Festival Records. Australian musicologist, Ian McFarlane, described the album as a "mix of trashy pop and indie guitar rock [which] found a ready-made market. There were plenty of loose arrangements in the songs, with Palmer's guitar and Kennedy's quavering, imperfect vocals laid down rough and raw". They released CD singles from the album, "Going Down" / "Valentine's Day" (June 1995), "She Loves She" (October) and "Sister" (April 1996). The singles were co-written by Jones, Kennedy and Palmer, except "She Loves She" which was co-written by the three with Charlie Marshall.

In November 1996 Jones' bandmate from Crowded House, Nick Seymour, joined on bass guitar – allowing Palmer to concentrate on lead guitar for live performances. Stu Thomas had earlier been approached to join on bass but turned it down due to solid commitments in Kim Salmon and the Surrealists. Deadstar toured the United Kingdom where "Valentine's Day" was issued as the A-side of their debut single for Discordant Records. Late that year, Palmer started producing the debut solo album, King Without a Clue, for Nick's older brother, Mark, which was released in the following year. Mark was Palmer's bandmate in Hunters & Collectors, Palmer co-wrote five tracks with Mark and provided lead guitar. Fellow deadstar members, Nick (on bass guitar, backing vocals and piano) and Jones (on drums and percussion), also worked on the album.

In January 1997, Deadstar appeared on the Big Day Out tour. In August that year they issued their second studio album, Milk, which Palmer co-produced with Kalju Tonuma (Nick Barker, The Mavis's). McFarlane felt the album contained "garagey pop gems". In Australia two singles were released from the album, "Don't It Get You Down?" (September 1996) and "I've Got Something to Tell You" (June 1997). Both singles were co-written by Jones, Kennedy and Palmer. In the UK they issued "Sex Sell" as their lead single from Milk (titled Deadstar for the European market) on Discordant Records. At the ARIA Music Awards of 1997 "Don't It Get You Down?" was nominated for Best Independent Release. Late that year Nick Seymour left Deadstar and was replaced on bass guitar by Pete McCracken – Kennedy's bandmate from Plum and her future husband.

By mid-1998 Michael den Elzen (ex-Schnell Fenster, Rebecca's Empire) joined on lead guitar and Deadstar started recording their third album, Somewhere Over the Radio. Its lead single, "Run Baby Run", appeared in January 1999, which reached the top 100 on the ARIA Singles Chart. "Run Baby Run" was co-written by Kennedy and Palmer. Deadstar employed The Killjoys' band member, Anna Burley, as auxiliary keyboardist when performing live. A second single, "Deeper Water", appeared in June, which peaked at No. 28. "Deeper Water" was also co-written by Kennedy and Palmer. The album followed in September and was co-produced by Palmer, Tonuma and Mark Opitz (AC/DC, The Angels, INXS).

During 1999 Mushroom Records owner Michael Gudinski sold his record label to Festival Records. As a result of the negotiations and subsequent sale of Mushroom Records, the promotion of deadstar's album was compromised. At the ARIA Music Awards of 1999 "Run Baby Run" was nominated for Best Pop Release. A third single, "Somewhere Over the Radio", appeared in May 2000 but did not chart. At the ARIA Music Awards of 2000 Somewhere Over the Radio was nominated for Best Rock Album. The group disbanded in 2001.

The band enjoyed mixed commercial success during their existence. They had some success in the UK and toured there after extensive radio play of "Sex Sell". They were played on national Australian radio station Triple J with two of their tracks listed on its annual Hottest 100: "Don't It Get You Down" at No. 70 in 1996 and "Deeper Water" at No. 74 in 1999. They were picked up by commercial radio stations and their music was used in TV ("Run Baby Run" on Home and Away, Queen Kat Carmel and St. Jude, and Good News Week; "Deeper Water" on The Panel) and film productions.

== Other projects ==
Before Caroline Kennedy joined Deadstar she played guitar and sang in The Plums, with Shamus Goble on drums, Pete McCracken on bass guitar and Stephen Moffatt on guitar. McFarlane described their sound as "mixed strident guitar riffs with melodic pop roots" and Kennedy as "the band's focal point with her tough-but-graceful presence, opinionated views and emotion-charged, if imperfect, vocals". While a member of Deadstar she also had her own project, The Caroline Kennedy Conspiracy, with Goble and McCracken, joined by Ted Cleaver on guitar. After Deadstar had disbanded in 2001 Kennedy, McCracken and Goble formed The Kicksilvers with McCracken's sister, Jane on bass guitar. In 2002 Kennedy, McCracken and Goble formed The Tulips and they released a country-tinged album, In the Honeycone (May 2003).

Barry Palmer continued to write, record and perform with Hunters & Collectors during his time with Deadstar until that group disbanded in March 1998. Palmer formed his own label, The Devil's Music, and continued to record, produce and write.

Peter Jones worked as a session musician for various groups including in Ross Hannaford's Reggaebites (2002). As a producer he worked on albums by Stephen Cummings Firecracker (3 February 2003), Close Ups (16 August 2004), Tess McKenna Boom Bam (2003), Rebecca Barnard Fortified (2006); and also worked as a teacher in Melbourne. He died on 18 May 2012 of brain cancer, aged 49.

== Discography ==
=== Studio albums ===
Title	Details	Peak chart positions
Title	Details	AUS
Deadstar	Released: October 1995; Label: Mushroom Records (D24379); Format: CD	—
Milk	Released: April 1997; Label: Mushroom Records (D31616); Format: CD	91
Somewhere Over the Radio	Released: September 1999; Label: Mushroom Records (MUSH33240.2); Format: CD	66

=== Compilation albums ===
Title	Details
The Definitive Collection	Released: August 2004; Label: Festival / Mushroom (337722); Format: CD

=== Singles ===
List of singles as lead artist, with Australian chart positions
Title	Year	Peak chart positions	Album
Title	Year	AUS	Album
"Going Down"/"Valentine's Day"	1995	—	Deadstar
"She Loves She"	1995	—	Deadstar
"Sister"	1996	—	Deadstar
"Sex Sells" (UK release)	1996	—	Milk
"Don't It Get You Down"	1996	124	Milk
"I've Got Something To Tell You"	1997	195	Milk
"Run Baby Run"	1999	64	Somewhere Over the Radio
"Deeper Water"	1999	28	Somewhere Over the Radio
"Over the Radio"	2000	179	Somewhere Over the Radio

== Awards and nominations ==
=== ARIA Music Awards ===
The ARIA Music Awards are a set of annual ceremonies presented by Australian Recording Industry Association (ARIA), which recognise excellence, innovation, and achievement across all genres of the music of Australia. They commenced in 1987. Deadstar were nominated for three ARIA Music Awards

Year	Nominee / work	Award	Result
1997	"Don't it Get You Down"	Best Independent Release	Nominated
1999	"Run Baby Run"'	Best Pop Release	Nominated
2000	Somewhere Over the Radio	Best Rock Album	Nominated
