= Pete McCracken =

- Born: Peter Richard McCracken
- Origin: Melbourne, Victoria, Australia
- Genres: Rock, classical
- Occupations: Musician, composer
- Instruments: Guitar, bass guitar, piano, violin

Peter Richard McCracken is an Australian composer, guitarist and singer-songwriter, living and working in the Melbourne area. He has been a member of indie band The Plums (1992–1995), pop-rock band Deadstar (1997–2001) and country-tinged duo The Tulips (2002–2006). He married visual artist and bandmate Caroline Kennedy-McCracken. By 2005, the couple had two children.

== Biography ==
Peter Richard McCracken completed post-graduate studies in composition at the University of Melbourne in 2008, having previously studied music at La Trobe University. In 2006 he studied guitar and composition at Mannes College in New York. He has composed works for solo piano, guitar ensemble, violin and piano, and chamber ensemble. His instrumental work is post-minimalist.

In 1992 McCracken, on bass guitar, joined The Plums, an indie guitar pop four-piece group in Melbourne, with his future wife Caroline Kennedy-McCracken on lead vocals and guitar, Steve Moffat on guitar and Shamus Goble on drums. The band were signed to Mushroom's Temptation label soon after they recorded their first extended play Au Revoir Sex Kitten, which was issued by that label in November 1992. The Plums recorded another EP, Read All Over (May 1993), and followed with a studio album, Gun (April 1994) which was picked up and played by national radio broadcaster, JJJ. Their last recording was an EP, Heavenly, which was released in June 1995 and the band broke up in August.

Around this time McCracken had formed the punk-pop band Dangersharks, members of which included at various times Sam Maughan, Stan Dunsten, David Nelson, bassist Daniel Elhay, saxophonist Charlie Todd (the Wreckery), James Todd, Moffat and Juz Siedle. The band gathered a loyal following of fans and gained a reputation as a somewhat lunatic underground "collective", releasing Bare Foot Head, a seven-track EP.

In 1997 McCracken joined Melbourne pop-rock band, Deadstar, replacing previous bass guitarist Nick Seymour. McCracken appeared on the third Deadstar studio album, Somewhere Over the Radio (September 1999). In 1998 he toured with The Caroline Kennedy Conspiracy with Kennedy-McCracken, Tim "Teddy" Cleaver on guitar and Goble. In 2001, McCracken, now on lead guitar, and Kennedy-McCracken formed Kicksilvers, Goble soon joined and they recruited McCracken's sister Jane McCracken on bass guitar. That year the group issued a self-titled three-track EP on their own label, kicksilvers, which was produced by the band and Cleaver. In April 2002 the band performed in New South Wales with Graeme Cameron on drums.

In 2002, The Tulips was formed as a country group with McKracken on lead guitar and Kennedy-McCracken, they issued an eponymous EP. Other early members of The Tulips were former Kicksilvers bandmates, Jane McCracken and Cameron. On 17 May 2003 they released a studio album, In the Honeycone, as a duo on Belmore Records. In 2005 they recorded Free Like a Bird with Tony Cohen, which was never commercially released.

By 2005, McCracken was married to Kennedy-McCracken and the couple had two children.
