= Vinyl Group =

Australian music technology company

Vinyl Group Ltd
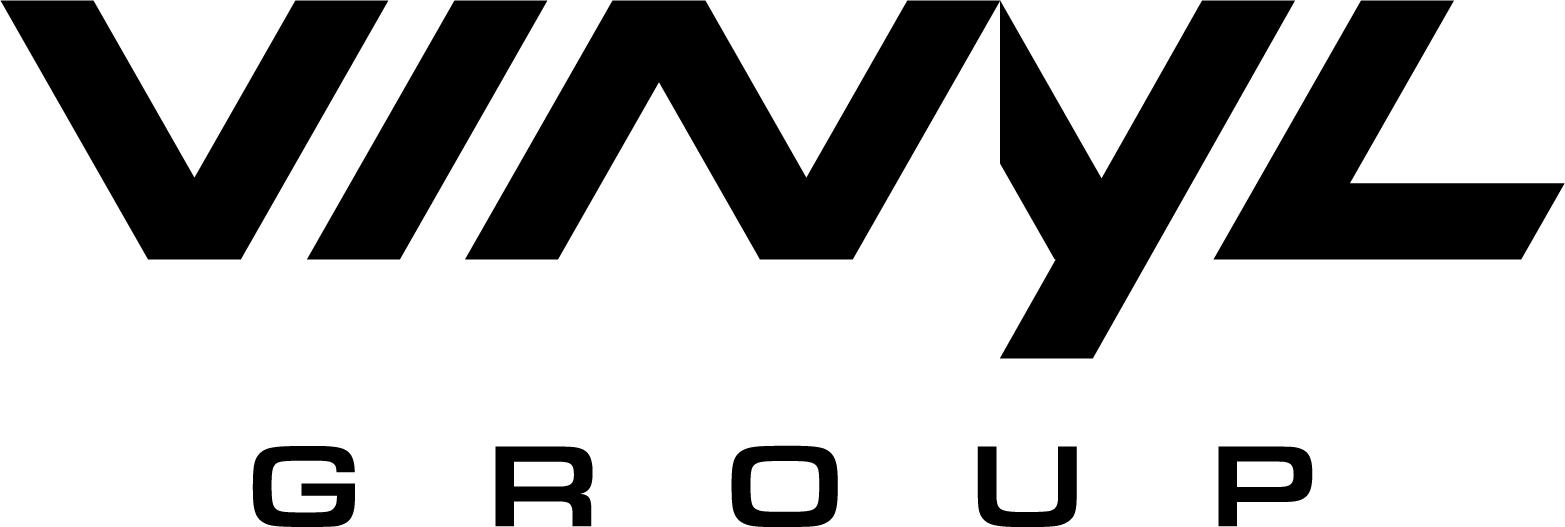
- Type: Public
- Traded as: ASX: VNL
- Industry: Music technology
- Founded: 2023
- Headquarters: South Yarra, Melbourne, Australia
- Key people: Josh Simons (CEO); Jorge Nigaglioni (CFO)
- Products: Vinyl Media, Vampr, Jaxsta, Vinyl.com, Serenade
- Revenue: A$20 million (December 2024, pro forma)
- Total assets: A$24,685,003 (December 2024)
- Number of employees: 60
- Website: vinyl.group

Vinyl Group Ltd is an Australian music technology company which is traded on the Australian Securities Exchange. Its subsidiaries are Jaxsta (a music credit database), Vampr (a music networking platform), Vinyl.com (an online record store), Vinyl Media (a publishing and events business), and Serenade (a Web3 pioneer of physical and digital collectibles). The company is headed by CEO Josh Simons, who co-founded Vampr in 2015.

== History ==
Vinyl Group started as Jaxsta, which was listed as a public company on the ASX on 28 December 2018.

In February 2023, the company announced it would acquire Vampr, a music networking platform that connects musicians and industry professionals, headed by Josh Simons. The acquisition was completed in June 2023. Vampr’s founder and CEO Josh Simons initially joined Jaxsta as Chief Strategy Officer and was subsequently appointed CEO on 29 June 2023.

Jaxsta launched Vinyl.com in May 2023, offering a catalog of vinyl records across all genres with verified creative contributions metadata on every album.

Jaxsta rebranded as Vinyl Group Ltd in December 2023 to better reflect its expanded operations.

In January 2024, Vinyl Group completed the acquisition of The Brag Media, a publishing and events business with about 10 million monthly active users (MAUs) across its brands, significantly enhancing Vinyl Group's reach and sales opportunities. The acquisition deal was valued at $8 million and was supported by an $11 million funding facility.

In August 2024, Vinyl Group announced it would acquire media and marketing trade publication Mediaweek for A$500,000 in cash and A$500,000 in shares. In September 2024, the company acquired Funkified Entertainment Pty Ltd, bringing The Brag Media events in-house through a deal valued at up to A$2.5 million, consisting of both cash and scrip. Simultaneously, it completed an all-scrip acquisition for 100% of the assets of Serenade, a UK-based digital collectibles startup, including the shares of its UK subsidiary.

In February 2025, the company announced a consolidation of its media assets under the publishing banner Vinyl Media. In the same month, the company completed its acquisition of Concrete Playground, an Australian and New Zealand city guide digital publication, for $5.5 million. In June 2025, it was disclosed that Songtradr had agreed to provide the company with a A$1.5 million line of credit alongside its acquisition of Vinyl.com.

In November 2025, the company was named second in Deloitte's 2025 Tech Fast 50, which recognises the fastest growing technology companies in Australia. In March 2026, Vinyl Group entered an agreement to acquire Val Morgan Digital. At the same time, Vinyl Group and Val Morgan formed a partnership covering cross-selling opportunities across outdoor and cinema advertising. Val Morgan retained ownership of the outdoor advertising (Val Morgan Outdoor, or VMO) and cinema advertising (Val Morgan Cinema) capabilities.

In June 2026, Vinyl Group announced it would acquire Pedestrian Group.

== Operations ==
Vinyl Group focuses on leveraging technology to connect creators, fans, and brands within the music ecosystem.

=== Vinyl Media ===
Vinyl Media was launched in February 2025 and is the publisher of consumer and trade publications including Rolling Stone Australia, Variety Australia, Mediaweek, Refinery29 Australia, The Music Network, Tone Deaf and Concrete Playground. After acquiring Val Morgan Digital in 2026, the company gained the Australian and New Zealand licenses for brands such as BuzzFeed, Fandom, LADbible Group and Vox Media.

=== Vampr ===
Vampr is a social-professional network and talent marketplace, helping creatives in over 180 countries find collaborators and monetize their work. The platform has introduced features like Credits and Verification, integrating Jaxsta Creator features into Vampr Pro subscriptions.

=== Jaxsta ===
Jaxsta is a database of official music credits, offering subscription, API, and freemium access. It supports rights holders with recording matching, achieving a 97% match rate. The database contains over 330 million official, deep-linked music credits across 105 million pages.

=== Vinyl.com ===
Vinyl.com is an online record store which launched in 2023. It allows music fans to buy records and explore liner notes, offering over 50,000 records across all genres. The platform is powered by Jaxsta Official Music Credits.

=== Serenade ===
Serenade produces physical and digital collectables that have served over 200 artists worldwide including Liam and Noel Gallagher, Muse, Sum 41, Twenty One Pilots and Thirty Seconds to Mars. Their Smart Formats combine the use of NFC and NFT technologies.

== Leadership changes ==
On 28 April 2022, it was announced that Jaxsta founder Jacqui Louez Schoorl would step down as CEO and former chief marketing officer Beth Appleton would be Jaxsta's new CEO. The Music Network reported that "the change will allow Louez Schoorl to focus on the Jaxsta product and our community and creative relationships". Before joining Jaxsta in July 2021, Appleton had been the senior vice president marketing Australasia at Warner Music Australia.

Josh Simons, founder and CEO of Vampr, and former indie-rock musician with his band Buchanan, was appointed CEO, succeeding Appleton on 29 June 2023. He was subsequently appointed to the board as executive director in May 2024.

== Notable shareholders ==
The company has received substantial investment from music licensing company Songtradr, who first invested in 2020 and steadily increased their holding over time to become a significant shareholder by June 2024.

As of June 2024 Richard White was the largest shareholder. Robert Millner also participated in the company's latest securities offering.
