= Ripcord World Tour =

2016 concert tour by Keith Urban

ripCORD World Tour
- Tour by Keith Urban
- Associated albums: Ripcord
- Start date: 2 June 2016
- End date: 17 December 2016
- Legs: 4
- No. of shows: 61 in North America; 10 in Oceania; 71 in total
- Attendance: 612,543
- Box office: $33,581,489
Keith Urban tour chronology
Raise 'Em Up Tour (2014)	Ripcord World Tour (2016)	Graffiti U World Tour (2018)
Carrie Underwood tour chronology
Storyteller Tour: Stories in the Round (2016)	Ripcord World Tour (2016)	The Cry Pretty Tour 360 (2019)

The Ripcord World Tour (stylized as the ripCORD World Tour) was the tenth headlining concert tour by New Zealand-born Australian country music singer Keith Urban, in support of his ninth studio album Ripcord (2016). The tour began on 2 June 2016 in Bonner Springs, Kansas and concluded on 17 December 2016 with two shows in Brisbane, Australia. Brett Eldredge, Maren Morris, and Dallas Smith all served as supporting acts for Urban in North America. The Oceania leg of the tour was co-headlined with American singer Carrie Underwood, with Buchanan as opening act.

== Background ==
The tour was first announced in January 2016. About the tour, Urban said that new music from RipCORD would be played, there would be new production, and that he would be playing in cities he'd never been to before. Australian dates were announced in April 2016.

== Opening acts ==
- Maren Morris (North America)
- Brett Eldredge (North America, select dates)
- Dallas Smith (Canada, select dates)
- Buchanan (Oceania)

== Setlists ==
North America

This set list was obtained from the 2 June 2016 concert in Bonner Springs, Kansas. It does not represent all concerts during the tour.

1. "Gone Tomorrow (Here Today)"
2. "Long Hot Summer"
3. "Break on Me"
4. "Where the Blacktop Ends"
5. "Somewhere in My Car"
6. "Everybody"
7. "Blue Ain't Your Color"
8. "Gettin' in the Way"
9. "Days Go By"
10. "We Were Us" (performed with Maren Morris)
11. "Cop Car"
12. "The Fighter"
13. "You Gonna Fly"
14. "You Look Good in My Shirt"
15. "Somebody Like You"
16. "That Could Still Be Us"
17. "Little Bit of Everything"
18. "Sun Don’t Let Me Down"
19. "Wasted Time"
20. "John Cougar, John Deere, John 3:16"
21. "But for the Grace of God"

Encore

22. "Stupid Boy"
23. "Raise 'Em Up"
Oceania
1. "Gone Tomorrow (Here Today)"
2. "Long Hot Summer"
3. "Break on Me"
4. "Where the Blacktop Ends"
5. "Somewhere in My Car"
6. "Worry 'Bout Nothin'"
7. "Blue Ain't Your Color"
8. "Days Go By"
9. "We Were Us"
10. "Cop Car"
11. "Sweet Thing"
12. "Unintended"
13. "One Call Away"
14. "Sun Don't Let Me Down"
15. "The Fighter" / "Stop Draggin' My Heart Around"
16. "You Look Good in My Shirt"
17. "Somebody Like You"
18. "Who Wouldn't Wanna Be Me"
19. "Little Bit of Everything"
20. "John Cougar, John Deere, John 3:16" / "Jack & Diane" / "No Woman, No Cry"
21. "Wasted Time"

Encore

22. "Making Memories of Us"
23. "Stupid Boy"
24. "Raise 'Em Up"
Carrie Underwood set list

Carrie Underwood co-headlined with Urban during shows in Oceania.

1. "Good Girl"
2. "Undo It"
3. "Church Bells"
4. "Wasted"
5. "Jesus, Take the Wheel"
6. "Blown Away"
7. "Cowboy Casanova"
8. "Dirty Laundry"
9. "Last Name"
10. "I Will Always Love You" (Dolly Parton cover)
11. "Flat on the Floor"
12. "Smoke Break"
13. "Before He Cheats"
14. "Something in the Water"

Encore

15. "The Fighter" (with Keith Urban)
16. "Stop Draggin' My Heart Around" (with Keith Urban)

== Tour dates ==
Date	City	Country	Venue	Opening acts	Attendance	Revenue
North America Leg 1
2 June 2016	Bonner Springs	United States	Providence Medical Center Amphitheater	Brett Eldredge; Maren Morris	10,465 / 18,000	$428,856
3 June 2016	Maryland Heights	United States	Hollywood Casino Amphitheatre	Brett Eldredge; Maren Morris	14,655 / 20,000	$510,366
4 June 2016	Noblesville	United States	Klipsch Music Center	Brett Eldredge; Maren Morris	14,470 / 24,665	$501,101
10 June 2016 (Note: This show was a part of the Carolina Country Music Festival)	Myrtle Beach	United States	Burroughs & Chapin Pavilion Place	—N/a		
11 June 2016	Alpharetta	United States	Verizon Wireless Amphitheatre	Brett Eldredge; Maren Morris	11,996 / 12,548	$666,386
16 June 2016	Orange Beach	United States	Amphitheater at The Wharf	Brett Eldredge; Maren Morris	8,812 / 8,812	$428,354
17 June 2016	Tampa	United States	MidFlorida Credit Union Amphitheatre	Brett Eldredge; Maren Morris	12,895 / 19,065	$496,286
18 June 2016	West Palm Beach	United States	Perfect Vodka Amphitheatre	Brett Eldredge; Maren Morris	12,327 / 19,296	$451,195
23 June 2016	Clarkston	United States	DTE Energy Music Theatre	Brett Eldredge; Maren Morris	14,609 / 14,950	$610,290
24 June 2016	Hopewell	United States	CMAC	Brett Eldredge; Maren Morris	9,942 / 14,772	$455,972
25 June 2016	Mansfield	United States	Xfinity Center	Brett Eldredge; Maren Morris	17,425 / 19,732	$673,264
2 July 2016	Gilford	United States	Bank of New Hampshire Pavilion	Brett Eldredge; Maren Morris	11,985 / 16,740	$862,430
3 July 2016	Gilford	United States	Bank of New Hampshire Pavilion	Brett Eldredge; Maren Morris	11,985 / 16,740	$862,430
8 July 2016	Toronto	Canada	Molson Canadian Amphitheatre	Brett Eldredge; Maren Morris	27,299 / 31,312	$961,690
9 July 2016	Toronto	Canada	Molson Canadian Amphitheatre	Brett Eldredge; Maren Morris	27,299 / 31,312	$961,690
14 July 2016	Cincinnati	United States	Riverbend Music Center	Brett Eldredge; Maren Morris	12,928 / 20,317	$441,637
15 July 2016	Cuyahoga Falls	United States	Blossom Music Center	Brett Eldredge; Maren Morris	16,171 / 20,867	$641,740
16 July 2016	Holmdel	United States	PNC Bank Arts Center	Brett Eldredge; Maren Morris	16,253 / 16,748	$640,540
21 July 2016	West Valley City	United States	USANA Amphitheatre	Brett Eldredge; Maren Morris	16,221 / 19,782	$627,456
22 July 2016	Greenwood Village	United States	Fiddler's Green Amphitheatre	Brett Eldredge; Maren Morris	16,444 / 17,168	$788,017
23 July 2016	Albuquerque	United States	Isleta Amphitheater	Brett Eldredge; Maren Morris	9,782 / 15,251	$328,659
27 July 2016 (Note: This concert is a part of the Harveys Lake Tahoe Summer Concert Series)	Stateline	United States	Lake Tahoe Outdoor Arena	Brett Eldredge; Maren Morris	13,644 / 14,888	$1,175,359
28 July 2016	Mountain View	United States	Shoreline Amphitheatre	Brett Eldredge; Maren Morris	13,131 / 22,000	$476,818
29 July 2016 (Note: This concert is a part of the Harveys Lake Tahoe Summer Concert Series)	Stateline	United States	Lake Tahoe Outdoor Arena	—N/a	The boxscore for this date is included in the box score for 27 July according to Billboard.	
31 July 2016 (Note: This concert is a part of the Watershed Music Festival)	George	United States	The Gorge Amphitheatre	—N/a		
4 August 2016	Bozeman	United States	Brick Breeden Fieldhouse	Brett Eldredge; Maren Morris	6,076 / 7,610	$383,325
5 August 2016	Pocatello	United States	Portneuf Health Trust Amphitheatre	Brett Eldredge; Maren Morris	9,033 / 10,901	$455,505
7 August 2016 (Note: This concert is a part of the Watershed Music Festival)	George	United States	The Gorge Amphitheatre	—N/a		
18 August 2016	Charlotte	United States	PNC Music Pavilion	Brett Eldredge; Maren Morris	11,022 / 18,772	$393,442
19 August 2016	Raleigh	United States	Coastal Credit Union Music Park	Brett Eldredge; Maren Morris	13,642 / 18,033	$440,343
20 August 2016	Virginia Beach	United States	Veterans United Home Loans Amphitheater	Brett Eldredge; Maren Morris	11,615 / 18,216	$403,761
25 August 2016 (Note: This concert is a part of the Great New York State Fair)	Geddes	United States	Lakeview Amphitheater	Brett Eldredge; Maren Morris	9,068 / 17,030	$378,646
26 August 2016	Camden	United States	BB&T Pavilion	Brett Eldredge; Maren Morris	14,039 / 24,761	$526,219
27 August 2016	Bristow	United States	Jiffy Lube Live	Brett Eldredge; Maren Morris	16,248 / 23,305	$627,666
10 September 2016	Vancouver	Canada	Rogers Arena	Dallas Smith; Maren Morris	12,798 / 13,134	$933,469
11 September 2016	Kelowna	Canada	Prospera Place	Dallas Smith; Maren Morris	4,583 / 4,583	$496,065
13 September 2016	Prince George	Canada	CN Centre	Dallas Smith; Maren Morris	4,575 / 4,575	$512,476
15 September 2016	Calgary	Canada	Scotiabank Saddledome	Dallas Smith; Maren Morris	11,012 / 11,012	$846,851
16 September 2016	Edmonton	Canada	Rogers Place	Dallas Smith; Maren Morris	12,032 / 12,032	$920,283
17 September 2016	Saskatoon	Canada	SaskTel Centre	Dallas Smith; Maren Morris	10,808 / 10,808	$821,051
Oceania
30 September 2016 (Note: This concert is a part of the Deni Ute Muster.)	Deniliquin	Australia	Deniliquin Festival Site	—N/a		
North America Leg 2
6 October 2016	Bismarck	United States	Bismarck Civic Center	Brett Eldredge; Maren Morris	—N/a	—N/a
7 October 2016	Sioux City	United States	Gateway Arena	Brett Eldredge; Maren Morris	—N/a	—N/a
8 October 2016	Lincoln	United States	Pinnacle Bank Arena	Brett Eldredge; Maren Morris	—N/a	—N/a
13 October 2016	San Antonio	United States	Illusions Theater	Brett Eldredge; Maren Morris	7,030 / 10,795	$384,263
14 October 2016	Dallas	United States	American Airlines Center	Brett Eldredge; Maren Morris	10,082 / 11,780	$521,175
15 October 2016	New Orleans	United States	Smoothie King Center	Brett Eldredge; Maren Morris	9,746 / 10,235	$545,374
20 October 2016	Los Angeles	United States	Staples Center	Brett Eldredge; Maren Morris	10,863 / 10,863	$765,100
21 October 2016	Las Vegas	United States	T-Mobile Arena	Brett Eldredge; Maren Morris	—N/a	—N/a
22 October 2016	Phoenix	United States	Talking Stick Resort Arena	Brett Eldredge; Maren Morris	11,503 / 11,503	$569,256
27 October 2016	Moline	United States	iWireless Center	Brett Eldredge; Maren Morris	8,580 / 10,088	$422,371
28 October 2016	Rosemont	United States	Allstate Arena	Brett Eldredge; Maren Morris	12,205 / 12,205	$712,170
29 October 2016	Toledo	United States	Huntington Center	Brett Eldredge; Maren Morris	7,451 / 7,451	$502,134
4 November 2016	Milwaukee	United States	BMO Harris Bradley Center	Brett Eldredge; Maren Morris	—N/a	—N/a
5 November 2016	Minneapolis	United States	Target Center	Brett Eldredge; Maren Morris	—N/a	—N/a
6 November 2016	Duluth	United States	AMSOIL Arena	Brett Eldredge; Maren Morris	—N/a	—N/a
11 November 2016	Nashville	United States	Bridgestone Arena	Brett Eldredge; Maren Morris	13,462 / 13,462	$670,165
12 November 2016	Bloomington	United States	U.S. Cellular Coliseum	Brett Eldredge; Maren Morris	6,391 / 6,904	$404,834
13 November 2016	Youngstown	United States	Covelli Centre	Brett Eldredge; Maren Morris	5,805 / 5,894	$426,083
17 November 2016	Hershey	United States	Giant Center	Brett Eldredge; Maren Morris	8,493 / 8,493	$489,987
18 November 2016	Uncasville	United States	Mohegan Sun Arena	Brett Eldredge; Maren Morris	5,044 / 5,131	$455,910
19 November 2016	Brooklyn	United States	Barclays Center	Brett Eldredge; Maren Morris	10,664 / 12,883	$697,746
Oceania (with Carrie Underwood)
3 December 2016	Wellington	New Zealand	Westpac Stadium	Buchanan	—N/a	
6 December 2016	Adelaide	Australia	Adelaide Entertainment Centre	Buchanan	—N/a	
8 December 2016	Melbourne	Australia	Rod Laver Arena	Buchanan	18,726 / 19,310	$1,867,220
9 December 2016	Melbourne	Australia	Rod Laver Arena	Buchanan	18,726 / 19,310	$1,867,220
10 December 2016	Canberra	Australia	GIO Stadium	Buchanan	—N/a	
12 December 2016	Sydney	Australia	Qudos Bank Arena	Buchanan	12,333 / 12,709	$1,260,600
14 December 2016	Sydney	Australia	ICC Sydney Theatre	Buchanan	7,575 / 7,588	$700,273
16 December 2016	Brisbane	Australia	Brisbane Entertainment Centre	Buchanan	18,585 / 18,920	$1,881,310
17 December 2016	Brisbane	Australia	Brisbane Entertainment Centre	Buchanan	18,585 / 18,920	$1,881,310
Total					612,543 / 757,899	$33,581,489

Festivals and other miscellaneous performances

=== Cancellations and rescheduled shows ===
27 October 2016	Grand Rapids, Michigan	Van Andel Arena	Cancelled
