= Watershed Music Festival =

Annual country music festival

- Genre: Country
- Dates: August 2–4, 2024
- Location: George, Washington
- Years active: 2012–2019, 2021–

Watershed Music Festival is an annual country music festival held at the Gorge Amphitheatre in George, Washington. Produced by Live Nation, the first event was held August 3–5, 2012. Watershed is a summer festival and is usually a three day event. The main attractions of the festival are the multiple stages of live music, featuring a mixture of country music superstars, newcomers and local country performers.

== History ==
The inaugural festival was produced by Brian O'Connell, president of Live Nation's country division and six-time winner of the Country Music Association award for 'Promoter of the Year'.

When discussing the festival to Billboard Magazine, O'Connell said: "Watershed is an idea that we have been kicking around for a number of years. The Pacific Northwest is a real special place in our country. I've been doing shows up there at the Gorge for years, and Jeff Trisler, my partner at Live Nation and I got to talking about it, and we finally made the call six to eight months ago. I think it will be one of the most unique festivals that we have. We're not trying to be anything more than Watershed. It's going to have its own unique signature. It's got the beauty of the Gorge, and the Columbia River. It's something that can't be duplicated anywhere else."

There was no festival in 2020.

== Lineups by year ==
Summer 2019
- Miranda Lambert
- Zac Brown Band
- Jason Aldean
- Kane Brown
- Brothers Osborne
- Chris Young
- Maren Morris
- Midland
- Michael Ray
- Steven Lee Olsen
- Kip Moore
- Cody Johnson
- Carly Pearce
- Danielle Bradbery
- Waterloo Revival
- Cam
- Mitchell Tenpenny
- Randy Rogers Band
- Matt Stell
- Brandon Lay
- Ross Ellis
- Seaforth
- Austin Jenckes
- Dillon Carmichael
- Caylee Hammack
- Travis Denning
- Lauren Jenkins
- Cort Carpenter
- FreqCo
Summer 2018
- Brad Paisley
- Blake Shelton
- Brantley Gilbert
- Granger Smith
- Cole Swindell
- Brett Young
- Morgan Evans
- Chris Lane
- Locash
- Big & Rich
- Clint Black
- Dustin Lynch
- RaeLynn
- Cassadee Pope
- Jillian Jacquline
- Drew Baldridge
- Meghan Patrick
- Austin Jenckes
- James Barker Band
- Filmore
- The Steel Woods
- Jameson Rodgers
- Austin Burke
- Dylan Schneider
- Riley Green
- Mitchell Tenpenny
- Delta Rae
- Brown and Gray
Summer 2017
- Chris Stapleton
- Lee Brice
- Eric Paslay
- Maddie & Tae
- Michael Ray
- Josh Abbott Band
- Darius Rucker
- Randy Houser
- Chase Rice
- The Cadillac Three
- Lauren Alaina
- Bailey Bryan
- Luke Bryan
- Old Dominion
- Bobby Bones and the Raging Idiots
- William Michael Morgan
- High Valley
Summer 2016
- Jason Aldean
- Eric Church
- Keith Urban
- Lindsay Ell
- A Thousand Horses
- Jon Pardi
- Travis Tritt
- JT Hodges
- Raelynn
- Aaron Tippin
- Ben & Noel Haggard,
  - Merle Haggard was set to perform, but died in April 2016
- Kacey Musgraves
- Brooke Eden
- Maren Morris
- Brothers Osborne
- Chris Janson
- David Nail
- Brett Eldredge
Summer 2015
- Carrie Underwood
- Chris Young
- Clare Dunn
- Dierks Bentley
- Easton Corbin
- Florida Georgia Line
- Frankie Ballard
- Gary Allan
- Hunter Hayes
- Jana Kramer
- Joe Nichols
- Mark Chesnutt
- Cam
- Michael Ray
- Parmalee
- Sam Hunt
- Thomas Rhett
Summer 2014
- Lady Antebellum
- Tim McGraw
- Jake Owen
- Billy Currington
- Eli Young Band
- Randy Houser
- Justin Moore
- Kip Moore
- Cassadee Pope
Summer 2013
- Luke Bryan
- Toby Keith
- Brad Paisley
- Thompson Square
- Kip Moore
- Chris Young
- Blackberry Smoke
- Lee Brice
- Terri Clark
- Chris Cagle
- Drake White
- Shooter Jennings
- Neil McCoy
- Chase Rice
- Maggie Rose
Summer 2012
- Dierks Bentley
- Miranda Lambert
- Blake Shelton
- The Lost Trailers
- Steve Holy
- Johnny Reid
- Kix Brooks
- Dwight Yoakam
- Jon Pardi
- Thomas Rhett
- Uncle Kracker
- Sara Evans
- Tracy Lawrence
- Morgan Frazier
- Reckless Kelly
- Thompson Square
- Brantley Gilbert

== See also ==
- List of country music festivals
- Country music
