= Mediaweek (Australia) =

Australian media news website

- Mediaweek front page on 27 June 2025
- Website type: Media and industry news
- Founded: 1990 (as magazine)
- Predecessor: Mediaweek (print magazine)
- Headquarters: Sydney, New South Wales, Australia
- Owner: Vinyl Group
- Founder: Philip Luker
- Editor: Natasha Lee
- Website: www.mediaweek.com.au
- Launched: 1990; 36 years ago

Mediaweek is an Australian trade news website covering the media, marketing, and advertising industries. Founded in 1990 as a weekly print magazine, it transitioned to digital-only publishing in 2017.

The site reports on developments across Australia's television, radio, newspaper, magazine, and outdoor advertising sectors.

It is known for its editorial coverage, podcast productions, and industry events, including the flagship Mediaweek 100 and Mediaweek Next of the Best Awards.

Since 2004, it has also produced a weekday email newsletter titled the Mediaweek Morning Report.

== History ==
=== Print magazine (1990-2017) ===
Former masthead of Mediaweek

Mediaweek was founded by Philip Luker, an Australian publisher, in 1990, and was later expanded to cover the broader entertainment media industry.

In 1999, James Manning purchased the title from Luker and became editor and publisher, marking the beginning of a nearly 25-year tenure. During this period, the magazine developed a strong reputation as a leading trade publication within Australia's media sector.

Regular features in the print edition included Person of the Week, Inside News Brands, Inside Radio, Inside Magazines, Inside Digital, Inside Television, and Inside Subscription TV. The magazine also ran a photo spread of industry events and the column "Media People", which tracked personnel changes across the media landscape. It regularly published radio ratings and readership figures for newspapers and magazines.

Mediaweek ceased printing its magazine at the end of 2017, transitioning to a digital-only publication.

=== Television program (2009-2019) ===
Title card of Mediaweek television program

In 2009, Mediaweek launched a weekly television program of the same name on the Sky News Business Channel. The program aired at 2:30 p.m. on Thursdays and was co-hosted by editor James Manning and various rotating Sky News presenters.

The concept for the show was developed by then-Sky News CEO Angelos Frangopoulos and Manning, one year after the channel launched in January 2008. Over its ten-year run, the show featured regular interviews with CEOs across the television, radio, magazine, and digital sectors, along with media agency leaders and media personalities including Kevin McCloud, Eddie McGuire, and Matt Preston.

In addition to in-studio interviews, Mediaweek TV reported on location from free-to-air upfronts and filed international segments from London, New York, Los Angeles, Dublin, Bangkok, and China.

The show moved to the Your Money channel in late 2018 following the rebranding of Sky News Business as part of a joint venture between Nine and News Corp. It concluded on 16 May 2019 with the closure of the channel.

=== Website and digital expansion (2002-present) ===
Mediaweek established an online presence as early as 2002, and became one of the first Australian media trade titles to adopt a digital-first model, launching a daily email newsletter around 2004.

In 2015, Dan Barrett joined Mediaweek as deputy editor, contributing to both its print and digital operations. During his one-year tenure, he served as acting editor and helped modernise the brand's digital footprint, introducing a weekly podcast and overseeing a website upgrade.

In 2021, Trent Thomas became editor and later managing director and publisher of Mediaweek under the ownership of his company, Chattr.

In mid-2024, Thomas was the subject of two formal complaints alleging bullying and sexual harassment, prompting internal HR investigations. The second investigation, conducted by JAR Consultants, concluded that some of the allegations were substantiated. Shortly after, Thomas announced he would “step back” from the business and flagged a potential sale.

In August 2024 Mediaweek was acquired Vinyl Group, in a deal valued at A$1,000,000.

In late 2024, Frances Sheen was appointed Head of Content following Mediaweek's acquisition by Vinyl Group. A former Editor-in-Chief at 7NEWS.com.au, Sheen was tasked with setting the editorial direction and overseeing the brand's broader strategy and events portfolio.

Dan Barrett returned to Mediaweek in May 2025 as editor, bringing with him experience from senior digital content roles across SBS Australia, the NSW Government, and National Seniors Australia.

According to Ipsos iris data from February 2025, Mediaweek is now the most-read digital media news brand in Australia among its direct competitors.

== Podcasts ==
Mediaweek produces several podcasts that provide news, insight, and analysis on the Australian media, marketing, and advertising industries. These podcasts feature interviews with industry figures and discussions on current trends.

=== Origins ===
Among Mediaweek's first ventures into podcasting were the Seven Days podcast featuring weekly discussions between editor James Manning and deputy editor Kruti Joshi on key developments in the media industry, and the Mediaweek Industry Podcast. The latter, frequent featuring a segment co-hosted by Manning and TV columnist Andrew Mercado titled Mercado & Manning talk TV, offered television commentary, reviews, and insights, and later evolved into the TV Gold podcast.

=== Current lineup ===
Newsmakers – A series hosted by Natasha Lee, focusing on conversations with key figures shaping the Australian media landscape.

Mediaweek Presents – An in-depth look at issues affecting the media industry in Australia, featuring expert analysis and commentary.

Uncomfortable Growth® Uncut – Hosted by Rowena Millward, this podcast explores authentic leadership and personal growth through candid interviews.

Next of the Best: Beyond The Win – Hosted by Natasha Lee, this series revisits winners of the Mediaweek Next of the Best Awards to explore their subsequent journeys.

Mediaweek Heavy Hitters – Features interviews with some of the most influential individuals in the media sector.

== Events ==
Mediaweek is known for hosting prominent industry events that celebrate achievement and innovation in the Australian media landscape, the Mediaweek 100 and the Next of the Best Awards.

The Mediaweek 100 is an annual ranking that recognises the most influential media executives and professionals across Australia. The rankings are based on nominations, editorial review, and a combination of industry performance metrics.

The Next of the Best Awards, established as a companion initiative in 2023, honours emerging leaders and rising stars across media, marketing, and advertising. In addition to the awards ceremony, Mediaweek produces a podcast series titled Next of the Best: Beyond The Win, hosted by Natasha Lee, which revisits previous winners to explore their ongoing career journeys and contributions to the industry.
