= Pedestrian (website) =

Australian entertainment news website

- Website type: Digital media, news
- Available in: English
- Country of origin: Australia
- Owner: Vinyl Media
- Founders: Chris Wirasinha; Oscar Martin
- Editor: Alex Bruce-Smith
- Key people: Mason Rook, CEO
- Website: pedestrian.tv
- Commercial: Yes
- Launched: 2005
- Current status: Active

Pedestrian, formerly PEDESTRIAN.TV, is a youth-focused digital news and entertainment website based in Sydney, Australia, founded in 2005. It is a subsidiary of Vinyl Media.

In addition to their flagship website, the Pedestrian Group operates the creative industries-focused employment board Pedestrian JOBS and the seasonal outdoor cinema brand Openair Cinemas.

== History ==
Launched in 2005 by co-founders Chris Wirasinha and Oscar Martin, Pedestrian.TV was initially distributed as a DVD magazine, stylised as a "Plastizine", with the advertorial backing of BMW Mini. In 2007, the company shifted online, launching the Pedestrian.TV site.

Nine Entertainment subsequently acquired a 60% stake in Pedestrian.TV in 2015 for a reported $10 million. Nine bought out Wirasinha and Martin's remaining 40% ownership share in 2018 for an additional $39 million, putting the company's total valuation just shy of $100 million.

In 2017 Pedestrian.TV broke the story of youth government broadcaster Triple J's initial internal discussions regarding moving the Triple J Hottest 100 away from the controversial 26 January Australia Day public holiday. Triple J ultimately shifted the Hottest 100 date to the fourth weekend in January, citing a desire to remain "an event that everyone can enjoy together."

Following the merger of Nine and Fairfax Media in 2018, the business behind Pedestrian.TV was merged with that of Allure Media, forming the larger Pedestrian Group, with the website changing its name to Pedestrian, and also incorporating the brands Business Insider Australia, Gizmodo, Kotaku and POPSUGAR Australia. It was announced that it would continue to be run by its founders.

With Wirasinha and Martin shifting to advisory roles following the sale, Nine appointed Matt Rowley as the CEO of Pedestrian Group in early 2019. Also in 2019, Pedestrian acquired Openair Cinemas (formerly American Express Openair Cinemas), which arranged seasonal outdoor showings of films in open spaces across Australia and New Zealand.

According to audience data in September 2019, the website reached over one million unique users per month, and attracted in excess of two million monthly page views.

In March 2021, Pedestrian Group announced a multi-year deal with Vice Media and Refinery29 to become the Australian digital publishing home of both brands. A new team was announced for Refinery29 later that year, and in January 2022 a new team of five, headed by Brad Esposito, was announced to head up Vice Australia and New Zealand.

In August 2022, Pedestrian Group launched The Chainsaw, a publication focused on emerging Web3 technologies and cryptocurrency.

In 2023, Pedestrian announced the launch of PEDESTRIAN TELEVISION, a FAST channel available exclusively through 9Now featuring news and culture programming from across the group's brands, as well as a curated range of licensed content. The channel was later closed in 2025 as the company shifted focus to on-demand content.

In July 2024, it was reported that Pedestrian would undergo restructuring as part of a cost-cutting effort. Chief executive Matt Rowley announced his departure from the company and up to 40 positions will be eliminated. Pedestrian would also end their licensing deals with Vice, Refinery29, Gizmodo, Lifehacker, and Kotaku.

In June 2026, Vinyl Group announced it would acquire Pedestrian Group, reuniting the publication with several others it had held digital publishing rights for in the past. One week after the acquisition closed, it was reported that around half of the publication's staff were made redundant.

== Awards ==
Pedestrian.TV was awarded Brand of the Year by Mumbrella in 2015, 2016, and also 2020, with Pedestrian Group winning three other Mumbrella awards, for Best Publisher-Led Advertising Campaign, Event of the Year, and Branded Content Studio of the Year in the same year.
