= Peter McCracken (footballer, born 1883) =

Australian rules footballer

Personal information
- Full name: Peter McCracken
- Born: 4 February 1883; Prahran, Victoria
- Died: 9 November 1936 (aged 53); Rangiora, New Zealand
- Original team: Cumloden College

Playing career^{1}
Years	Club	Games (Goals)
1902	St Kilda	1 (1)
- ^{1} Playing statistics correct to the end of 1902.

Peter McCracken (4 February 1883 – 9 November 1936) was an Australian rules footballer who played with St Kilda in the Victorian Football League (VFL).

He subsequently moved to New Zealand where he was a sheep farmer, enlisting to serve towards the end of World War I but not seeing active duty.
