= Peter McCracken (footballer, born 1949) =

Australian rules footballer

Personal information
- Full name: Peter McCracken
- Born: 1 December 1949 (age 76)
- Original team: Glenhuntly
- Height: 175 cm (5 ft 9 in)
- Weight: 76 kg (168 lb)

Playing career^{1}
Years	Club	Games (Goals)
1968–1972	South Melbourne	17 (1)
- ^{1} Playing statistics correct to the end of 1972.

Peter McCracken (born 1 December 1949) is a former Australian rules footballer who played for the South Melbourne Football Club in the Victorian Football League (VFL).
