= Emmanuel Kelly =

Australian singer-songwriter

- Born: Iraq
- Origin: Australia
- Genre: Pop
- Occupation: Singer-songwriter
- Years active: 2011–present
- Label: Vampr Distribution

Emmanuel Kelly is an Australian singer-songwriter. He has toured internationally, including on the Music of the Spheres World Tour. Kelly initially rose to fame with his performances on The X Factor in Australia in 2011.

== Early life ==
Kelly has stated that he was found as an infant, abandoned in a box on a battlefield, by soldiers in Iraq. He was taken in by nuns of the Mother Teresa Orphanage in Baghdad. He was born with underdeveloped limbs as a consequence of prenatal exposure to chemical warfare. In 1998, Emmanuel and his brother, Ahmed, met their adoptive mother, Moira Kelly, and two years later immigrated to Australia. He underwent surgery which allowed him to wear prostheses. He became an Australian citizen in 2009.

== Career ==
At the age of 17, Kelly appeared on season 3 of The X Factor in Australia in 2011. His performances on the show led to over 500 million social media views despite being voted off prior to getting into the top 24. After leaving The X Factor, Kelly toured and played at venues that included Sydney Opera House and MGM Grand Arena. In 2018, Kelly released "Hello," his first single. He also performed at Teleton 2018 with Chris Martin from Coldplay.

Kelly attributes his musical inspirations to Andrea Bocelli, Coldplay, and Kelly Clarkson. He performed his single "Never Alone" on The Kelly Clarkson Show in 2020. He was a show headliner with Grace Jones at London Fashion Week in 2021. In 2022, Kelly co-founded Outlyer Entertainment, a talent agency, record label, and production company which focuses on disabled cast and crew. He launched the agency at an event at the 2022 Cannes Film Festival.

Kelly released his EP No Zodiac in 2024. The EP featured the singles "My Sky" and "Right From the Very Start", songs co-written by Simon Duffy. He also opened for Coldplay on its Music of the Spheres World Tour the same year.

In 2025, Kelly performed at the inaugural halftime show of that year's FIFA Club World Cup final, making him the first disabled star in a half-time show. The same year, he was the first disabled performer on the main stage of the Isle of Wight Festival.

In July 2026, Kelly performed at the inaugural 2026 FIFA World Cup final halftime show, curated by Chris Martin. He appeared in the show's finale alongside Coldplay, the PS22 Chorus and the Muppets, performing "We Dance", an original song written by Coldplay for the event.

== Discography ==
=== EPs ===
List of extended plays, with selected details
Title	Album details
No Zodiac	Released: 2024; Format: DVD, digital download; Label: Vampr Distribution

== Personal life ==
Kelly is the brother of Iraqi-born Australian Paralympic swimmer Ahmed Kelly.
