= Tre Capital =

American rapper (born 1995)

Tremayne Joiner
- Also known as: Tre Capital
- Born: Tremayne Marcell Joiner; June 8, 1995 (age 31); Los Angeles, California, U.S.
- Genres: Hip hop; R&B
- Occupations: Rapper; singer
- Years active: 2013–present

Tremayne Marcell Joiner (born June 8, 1995), also known as Tre Capital, is an American rapper and singer from Los Angeles. The son of rapper Xzibit, he is the founder and a member of the hip hop collective Deluxe or D.lx.

== Early life ==
Tre is the oldest son of rapper Xzibit. He began to practice freestyling on a daily basis while attending high school. He briefly attended West Los Angeles College before withdrawing in 2014.

== Career ==
=== 2013–2015: Early career and Gundam EP series ===
Tre's first solo full-length project, a 15-track mixtape titled Heaven Isn't Far From Here, was initially released on December 1, 2013 – the project was later re-released on November 16, 2015, via SoundCloud. The mixtape features guest vocals from American rapper Trae tha Truth and production contributions from Black Milk, Hit-Boy and DJ Dahi.

His second project, the first installment in a series of projects conceptually themed and inspired by Gundam, is a six-track EP titled Gundam Pt. I or Gundam Part 1. It was released via SoundCloud on September 21, 2014 – the EP features guest vocals from Canadian rapper Sean Leon and production contributions from Eestbound and Wondagurl.

His third project, a follow-up to Gundam Pt. I, is a six-track EP titled Gundam Pt. II or Gundam Part 2 – it was released on June 8, 2015. The EP features guest vocals from English rapper Danny Seth and fellow D.lx member Mathaius Young. The entire project was produced by Wondagurl and Eestbound – they are also both credited as executive producers for the project. A record titled 'Critical Thinking' from the project was featured during the tenth episode of OVO Sound Radio.

=== 2016–2017: I Can't Die Yet and We Must Do Better ===
Zane Lowe premiered Comeback of the Century – the first single from Joiner's fourth project – in December 2015 alongside Pusha T. The 11-track studio album titled I Can't Die Yet, was released on March 15, 2016. The album features production contributions from Eestbound, Cardo, Charlie Heat, Sango, Stwo and WondaGurl – there are no guest vocal contributions on the final published version of the album. The album later went on to be recognized by Just Blaze, Ab-Soul and Noah "40" Shebib.

Joiner was a candidate for the tenth pick on XXL's "2016 Freshman Class" – he subsequently lost the nomination to Lil Yachty.

Joiner's fifth project, an 11-track studio album titled We Must Do Better, was released on January 7, 2017. The album features vocals from SiR, TĀLĀ, Ismael & Martin $ky. The album also features production contributions from Eestbound, Haze Banga, Michael Seven, VNSN, and frequent collaborator WondaGurl.

=== 2018–present: Various projects and Hero ===
Following the release of We Must Do Better, Joiner began working as an intern for G.O.O.D. Music. On December 7, 2017, Tre announced via Twitter that a studio album titled Hero, would be released in 2018. His sixth project, an eight-track collaborative EP with Haze Banga titled New Tier, was released on February 28, 2018. His seventh project, a six-track collaborative EP with Mathaius Young titled Burnin' Castles, was released on May 30, 2018.

Tre has performed a wide variety of showcases including SOB'S NY, SXSW, headlining "The Mint" theatre 2x, Troubadour, El Rey, Santa Ana Observatory, Reggies in Chicago, Union, A3C & opening up for Legends on the Art of Rap Tour at the Palladium.

Blue Eyes White Dragon Flow was the first record recorded for the album (executive produced by frequent DONDA designer Joe Perez) while assisting and helping along sessions for the entire remainder of 2017 continuing into summer of 2018. The cover for Hero is designed by Alex Haldi. The listening session for Hero was held at No Name Studios June 28, 2018. The album features vocals from Anthony Kilhoffer & Mathaius Young. The album features production from Anthony Kilhoffer, WondaGurl, HazeBanga, S1, Josh Simons, Michael Seven, Nabeyin, VohnBeatz, Idle Kid & more — available on all streaming services.

== Influences ==
Joiner has stated that he is influenced by his father Xzibit, Big Sean, Nottz, Pusha T, Kanye West, Black Milk, Kendrick Lamar, J. Cole and Lil Wayne.

== Discography ==
=== Studio albums ===
List of studio albums, with selected details
Title	Album details
I Can't Die Yet	Released: March 15, 2016; Labels: Self-released; Formats: Digital download
We Must Do Better	Released: January 7, 2017; Labels: Self-released; Formats: Digital download
Hero	Released: June 29, 2018; Labels: D.LX; Formats: Digital download
Liberty	Released: April 24, 2020; Labels: D.LX; Formats: Digital download

=== Mixtapes ===
List of mixtapes, with selected details
Title	Album details
Heaven Isn't Far From Here	Released: December 1, 2013; Labels: Self-released; Format: Digital download

=== Extended plays ===
List of extended plays, with selected details
Title	Album details
Gundam Pt. I	Released: September 21, 2014; Labels: Self-released; Formats: Digital download
Gundam Pt. II	Released: June 8, 2015; Labels: Self-released; Formats: Digital download
New Tier (with HazeBanga)	Released: February 28, 2018; Labels: D.LX, PHZMSC; Formats: Digital download
Burnin' Castles (with Mathaius Young)	Released: May 31, 2018; Labels: D.LX, Nomad Music Group; Formats: Digital download

=== Singles ===
List of singles as lead artist, showing year released and album name
Title	Year	Album
"Comeback of the Century"	2015	I Can't Die Yet
"Welcome to the Glory"	2016	We Must Do Better
"Clean"	2016	We Must Do Better
"Descent"	2017	Non-album singles
"Inspired Freestyle"	2017	Non-album singles
"Blue Eyes White Dragon Flow"	2018	Hero
"GROSS!"	2018	Non-album singles
"PIVOT"	2018	Non-album singles
"Tolerate"	2018	Non-album singles
"Witness"	2019	Non-album singles
"Take a Guess"	2019	Non-album singles
"Overheat"	2019	Non-album singles
"WORTHY"	2019	Liberty
"RUN!"	2020	Liberty
