= No Dope on Sundays =

Studio album by Cyhi the Prynce
- Released: November 17, 2017
- Genre: Hip hop
- Length: 73:06
- Label: Sony
- Producers: Kanye West (exec.); Anthony Kilhoffer; Brandon Black; Charlie Heat; David & Eli; Edsclusive; Epikh Pro; Fr23sh; Free P; HighDefRazjah; Jaggerwerks; Josh Simons; K. Rachel Mills; Lex Luger; Mark Byrd; Nate & Charity; Novel; Oz; S1; Shawty Redd; Syk Sense; ThankGod4Cody; The Olympicks; Young Love

Cyhi the Prynce chronology
BHP 2: N.A.A.C.P. (2015)	No Dope on Sundays (2017)

Singles from Cyhi the Prynce
- 1. "Movin' Around" Released: June 29, 2017; 2. "Dat Side" Released: October 27, 2017

No Dope on Sundays is the debut studio album by American rapper Cyhi the Prynce, released on November 17, 2017, through Sony Music. The album's release follows years of label disputes and series of mixtapes spanning his career. It features guest appearances from Kanye West, whom also executively produced the album, as well as Pusha T, Schoolboy Q, Travis Scott, 2 Chainz, Jagged Edge, BJ the Chicago Kid, Estelle, and Ernestine Johnson. Meanwhile, production was handled by Anthony Kilhoffer, Charlie Heat, Lex Luger, Oz, S1, Shawty Redd, ThankGod4Cody, and The Olympicks, among others. Critical reception was generally positive, while commercial response was mediocre.

== Background ==
The album's cover art, tracklist and release date was revealed on November 10, 2017.

== Singles ==
The lead single, "Movin' Around" featuring Schoolboy Q, was released on June 29, 2017.

The second single, "Dat Side" featuring Kanye West, was released on October 27, 2017.

== Critical reception ==
Professional ratings
Review scores
Source	Rating
HipHopDX	4.5/5
HotNewHipHop	87%
Pitchfork	6.8/10
XXL	XL

No Dope on Sundays received positive reviews from music critics upon release. Scott Glaysher of XXL praised the album's cohesiveness and lyricism, stating: "No matter which way you slice it, CyHi The Prynce excels in his delivery on his official debut, making No Dope on Sundays a serious contender for one of the best albums of the year. He proves that jaw-dropping lyrical ability and vivid storytelling can be woven through catchy production to make the ultimate rap apex. With his goals of completely taking over the game in 2018, the album’s cohesive feel and stellar lyrical quality gets him closer to his final destination." Justin Ivey of HipHopDX stated that CyHi The Prynce "expands his artistry to show he’s more than a lyrical dynamo. It’s not always crisp, particularly when he strains his vocals on occasion, but it shows a willingness to challenge himself in the studio beyond penning meticulous bars". He also added No Dope On Sundays "is the culmination of a long journey that’s defied the odds."

Online publication HotNewHipHop concluded that CyHi The Prynce "finds a way to display his faith, paint stories of his hood, and rally for Black power without ever sounding preachy or overzealous; if Malcolm X had a rapping descendant, Cy would be him. Equally menacing and welcoming, raspy and smooth, CyHi the Prynce proves to the world that he will not be another rapper doomed to watch his debut sit on a dusty shelf, waiting in limbo for a release. He broke through his own struggles and crafted an album that deserves your attention. No Dope on Sundays may be one of the best rap albums of the year."

Jay Balfour of Pitchfork praised the album's lyricism and production, stating: "For all the bases it covers, No Dope on Sundays benefits from swift pacing. But there are still moments where CyHi gets bogged down doing too much and too little at the same time, coddling a story you’ve heard before or quipping a one-liner you can predict a mile away. After his verse on the title track, Pusha T thanks CyHi for granting him the quiet of an inconspicuous feature. “I was tryna’ make it as conversational as possible, ‘cause it’s just conversation,” the elder emcee says after clocking a gracefully minimal performance. CyHi doesn't have that conversational approachability to his raps. He sounds like a showman that puffs out his words with a deliberate, almost suspicious confidence. No Dope on Sundays sounds like the routine he's been waiting years to finally deliver.

== Track listing ==
Credits adapted from iTunes, Tidal and ASCAP.

No Dope on Sundays
No.	Title	Writer(s)	Producer(s)	Length
1.	"Amen (Intro)"	Cydel Young; Warren Griffin, Jr.; Jesse James; David Stokes; Marcus Byrd; K. Rachel Mills; Girvan Henry; Michael Davis; Orlando Powell	The Olympicks; Edsclusive^{[a]}	4:55
2.	"No Dope on Sundays" (featuring Pusha T)	Young; Terrence Thornton; Alonzo Stevenson; Demetrius Stewart; Lexus Lewis; Byrd; Jason Fox; Mills; Carlton Mays, Jr.; Henry; Davis; Edward Davidi; Powell; Brandon Black; John S. Carter; Timothy P. Gilbert	Mark Byrd; Lex Luger; Novel; Shawty Redd; HighDefRazjah^{[b]}; Young Love^{[b]}	6:22
3.	"Get Yo Money"	Young; Brandon Sewell; William Tyler; Byrd; Stevenson; Mills; Black; Henry; Darius Jenkins; Davis; Powell	Novel; Black; Byrd	5:29
4.	"Movin' Around" (featuring Schoolboy Q)	Young; Quincey Hanley; Henry; Davis; Byrd; Mills; Joshua Scruggs; Ozan Yildrim	Syk Sense; OZ	4:17
5.	"Trick Me" (featuring 2 Chainz)	Young; Davidi; David Ruoff; Elias Klughammer; Byrd; Tauheed Epps; Mills; Jenkins; Henry; Davis; Powell; Black; Eduardo Antonio Martinez	Edsclusive; David & Eli	4:34
6.	"Murda" (featuring Estelle)	Young; Byrd; Estelle Swaray; Black; Mills; Henry; Davis; Davidi; Ini Kamoze	Black; Byrd; Shawty Redd; Anthony Kilhoffer	4:04
7.	"Don't Know Why" (featuring Jagged Edge)	Young; Nathan Cooper; Charity Lewis; Davidi; Byrd; Stevenson; Mills; Black; Henry; Brian Casey; Brandon Casey; Davis; Powell	Nate & Charity; Novel; Byrd	6:07
8.	"God Bless Your Heart"	Young; Byrd; Black; Trey Daniels; Mills; Antione Joyner; Henry; Davis; Davidi; Jenkins; Powell	Black; Byrd	3:17
9.	"Dat Side" (featuring Kanye West)	Kanye West; Young; Davidi; Black; Mills; Byrd; Davis; Henry	Edsclusive	4:20
10.	"Looking for Love"	Young; Cody Fayne; Freddie Jefferson; Byrd; Black; Mills; Henry; Davis; Powell	ThankGod4Cody; Free P	4:51
11.	"Nu Africa" (featuring Ernestine Johnson)	Young; Mills; Larry Griffin, Jr.; Lance Powlis; Stuart Lowery; Jonathan Troy; Byrd; Henry; Davis	S1; Epikh Pro; Byrd	6:13
12.	"Free"	Young; Bryce Martin; Davidi; Byrd; Black; Mills; Henry; Davis; Powell	Edsclusive; Fr23sh; Jaggerwerks^{[b]}	4:50
13.	"80's Baby" (featuring BJ the Chicago Kid)	Young; Byrd; Black; Bryan Sledge; Powlis; Troy; Mills; Henry; Davis; Davidi; Powell	Black; Byrd	4:48
14.	"Closer"	Young; Byrd; Mills; Black; Davidi; Jenkins; Henry; Davis; Bradley Post; Powell	Byrd; Black	3:53
15.	"I'm Fine" (featuring Travis Scott)	Young; Jacques Webster; Mills; Josh Simons; Black; Byrd; Eric Mobley; Henry; Davis; Powell	Mills; Josh Simons; Black; Byrd; Kilhoffer; Charlie Heat^{[b]}	5:06
Total length:				73:06

Notes

- ^{^{^[a]}} signifies a co-producer
- ^{^{^[b]}} signifies an uncredited co-producer
- "No Dope on Sundays" feature background vocals from Artia Lockett, Kevin Bateman, Keisha Jackson, Kourtney Williams, Paris Williams and Cortez Harris
- "Get Yo Money" feature background vocals from V. Johnson, Ox and Novel
- "Don't Know Why" feature background vocals from LaKiery Shaffer
- "Looking For Love" feature background vocals from Kellye West, Artia Lockett, Kevin Bateman, Shonette McCalmon and Keisha Jackson
- "I'm Fine" feature background vocals from Pastor Cortez Harris

Sample credits

- "No Dope On Sundays" contains elements from "Incense and Peppermints" as performed by Strawberry Alarm Clock, written by John S. Carter and Timothy P. Gilbert.
- "Get Yo Money" contains elements from "Your Love Was Worth Waiting For" performed by The Ruffin Brothers.
- "Trick Me" contains elements from "Algo Más Que Un Amigo" performed by Raphael.
- "Murda" contains elements from "World a Music" performed by Ini Kamoze.
- "Don't Know Why" contains elements from "Living inside Your Love" performed by Earl Klugh.
- "Dat Side" contains elements from "In Love Again" performed by Georgi Stanchev.
- "Looking For Love" contains elements from "Whatcha Lookin' 4" performed by Kirk Franklin.
- "Closer" contains elements from "Let's Get Closer", as performed by Atlantic Starr and "22 Two's" as performed by Jay-Z.
- "Free" contains elements from "Free", as written and performed by Flyt.

== Personnel ==
Credits adapted from Tidal.

Performers

- Cyhi the Prynce – primary artist
- Pusha T – featured artist (track 2)
- Schoolboy Q – featured artist (track 4)
- 2 Chainz – featured artist (track 5)
- Estelle – featured artist (track 6)
- Jagged Edge – featured artist (track 7)
- Kanye West – featured artist (track 9)
- Ernestine Johnson – featured artist (track 11)
- BJ the Chicago Kid – featured artist (track 13)
- Travis Scott – featured artist (track 15)

Musicians

- Anthony Majors Jr. – drums (track 3)
- Lance Powlis – fluegelhorn (track 11)
- Jonathan Troy – bass (tracks 11, 13)
- Trey Daniels – saxophone (tracks 8, 13), alto saxophone (track 11)
- Eric Mobley – guitar (track 15)

Technical

- Cydel Young – recording engineer (track 1)
- Brandon Black – recording engineer (tracks 1, 2, 4, 7, 8, 13, 15)
- Finis "KY" White – mixing engineer (tracks 1, 3, 4, 5, 7, 9−13)
- Dave Kutch – mastering engineer (tracks 1, 2, 8, 14)
- Anthony Kilhoffer – mixing engineer (tracks 2, 6, 8, 14, 15)
- John Horesco – mastering engineer (tracks 3, 5, 6, 9, 10, 12, 13, 15)
- Anthony Majors Jr. – recording engineer (track 3)
- Darius Jenkins – recording engineer (tracks 3, 5)
- Glenn Schick – mastering engineer (tracks 4, 7, 11)
- Daniel Watson – recording engineer (track 9)
- Noah Goldstein – recording engineer (track 9)
- Brad Post – recording engineer (tracks 10, 11)

Production

- Kanye West – executive producer (all tracks)
- The Olympicks – producer (track 1)
- Edsclusive – co-producer (track 1), producer (tracks 5, 9, 12)
- Mark Byrd – producer (tracks 2, 3, 6, 7, 8, 11, 13−15)
- Lex Luger – producer (track 2)
- Novel – producer (tracks 2, 7)
- Shawty Redd – producer (tracks 2, 6)
- HighDefRazjah – uncredited co-producer (tracks 2)
- Young Love – uncredited co-producer (tracks 2)
- Brandon Black – producer (tracks 3, 6, 8, 13−15)
- Syk Sense – producer (track 4)
- OZ – producer (track 4)
- David & Eli – producer (track 5)
- Anthony Kilhoffer – producer (tracks 6, 15)
- Nate & Charity – producer (track 7)
- ThankGod4Cody – producer (track 10)
- Free P – producer (track 10)
- Epikh Pro – producer (track 11)
- S1 – producer (track 11)
- Fr23sh – producer (track 12)
- Jaggerwerks – uncredited co-producer (track 12)
- Katherine Mills – producer (track 15)
- Josh Simons – producer (track 15)
- Charlie Heat – uncredited co-producer (track 15)

Additional personnel

- Isaac Carter – consultant (track 2)

== Charts ==
Chart (2017)	Peak position
US Billboard 200	65
US Top R&B/Hip-Hop Albums (Billboard)	30
