= Jenny Queen =

American singer-songwriter

Background information
- Born: 1979 (age 46–47); Springfield, Ohio, United States
- Genres: Folk; country; pop
- Occupations: Singer-songwriter, author
- Years active: 2004–present
- Website: www.jennyqueen.com

Jenny Queen (born March 18, 1979) is a singer-songwriter and author. Both her songs and her literary writing often deal with memory and how people process memory over time. Her musical style encompasses elements from genres of roots, indie folk, neotraditional country, country and pop. Her lyrical content and voice have been described as a "combination of little girl and windswept and bruised woman."

== Early life ==
Queen was born March 18, 1979, in Springfield, Ohio. With family in southern Kentucky, Queen was exposed to bluegrass music pioneer Bill Monroe's music at a young age. With a grandfather who is a Southern Baptist minister, Queen sang in church groups throughout her teens. She attended Ohio State University, earning a B.A., graduating summa cum laude. Queen then went on to earn a master's degree in International Relations from University of Chicago. She is a volunteer for Amnesty International and has been involved with educating refugees.

== Career ==
While living in Sydney in 2004, her music career started when she met producer, Tony Buchen, of the Sydney outfit the Baggsmen. Buchen produced "Girls Who Cry Need Cake" on Laughing Outlaw Records. Queen's cover of Moby's song Porcelain was the album's first radio single, described by Allmusic as "flat-out brilliant", followed by second single, Drowning Slowly.

In 2007, Queen started work on her second album, "After The Dance." Recorded in Asbury Park, New Jersey, the album is produced by John Leidersdorf. Musicians on After The Dance include Jon Graboff of Ryan Adams and The Cardinals on pedal steel, Eric Silver on mandolin, Marc Swersky on bass, Justin King on electric guitar, Ehren Ebbage on acoustic guitar and Andy Letke of DeSol on rhodes piano and banjo. "After The Dance" was released March 2009 on ABC / Universal Records in Australia and New Zealand and in the rest of the world on Laughing Outlaw Records. The Australian describes "After The Dance" as having a melancholy edge, with a delicacy of tone.

In 2013 Jenny Queen began writing and recording on her third album, Small Town Misfits, which was released in May 2014 by ABC Music Australia.

As a writer, Jenny has penned Under Arms And Underage for Refugee Transitions Magazine, a publication operated by STARTTS (Service for Treatment and Rehabilitation Of Torture and Trauma Survivors). She is currently writing a retrospective of the artwork of the Debaser Graphic Arts Studio. Her novel, tentatively titled Hummingbird Cake, follows twin sisters growing up in rural America and the vast differences between their memories over the same life events. She has not yet begun seeking publication for her novel.

== Discography ==
Solo

- Girls Who Cry Need Cake (2004 Laughing Outlaw Records)
- After The Dance (2009, ABC Music)
- Small Town Misfits (2014, ABC Music)
- Baby it Was Real and We Were the Best (2018, ABC Music)

Other appearances

- Ten Cent Souvenir – Ehren Ebbage (2008 EE)
- The C Minus Project – Sam Schinazzi (2004 · Laughing Outlaw Records)
