= Val Morgan =

Australian advertising company

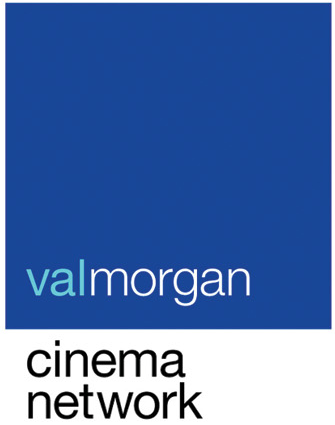
- Industry: Cinema advertising, out-of-home advertising
- Founded: 1894
- Headquarters: Sydney, Australia
- Area served: Australia; New Zealand
- Key people: Damian Keogh (CEO)
- Products: Val Morgan Cinema, VMO
- Owners: The HOYTS Group
- Website: www.valmorgan.com.au www.valmorganoutdoor.com

The Val Morgan Group, formerly known as Val Morgan Cinema Advertisers and Val Morgan Pty Ltd, is an Australian advertising company first established in 1894. The company currently specialises in cinema advertising and outdoor advertising across Australia and New Zealand, under the brands Val Morgan Cinema and VMO.

Val Morgan Cinema represents advertising opportunities across major Australian cinema chains including HOYTS, Event Cinemas, Village Cinemas, Reading Cinemas, Palace Cinemas, and Dendy Cinemas.

VMO (formerly known as Val Morgan Outdoor) operates advertising screens in shopping centres, health and wellness clubs, service stations and office towers, as well as outdoor digital billboards.

Val Morgan also previously operated the Australian versions of media websites including PopSugar, Thrillist, BuzzFeed, LADBible Group and Fandom through Val Morgan Digital. Val Morgan Digital was sold to Vinyl Group in March 2026.

== History ==
Val Morgan Cinema (formerly Val Morgan Cinema Advertisers and Val Morgan Pty Ltd) was first established in 1894 in Melbourne, Australia, by Valentine Morgan, initially offering advertising opportunities for live theatre and events. The company shifted to cinema advertising in 1914, and by the 1920s, Val Morgan was in control of the advertising in over 100 cinemas in Victoria.

In 2001, the company acquired Media Entertainment Group, leaving them as the only cinema advertising company in the Australian market. Val Morgan was acquired in a joint venture between HOYTS, Village Cinemas, and Amalgamated Holdings in 2004, with HOYTS later increasing their stake to 100%.

The company also acquired local advertising agency CINEads in 2013, returning to the Western Australian market for the first time since exiting the state in 2002.

In 2013, Val Morgan Cinema launched audience measurement system CineTAM, enabling on-screen advertising campaigns to be planned and bought against by target audiences. In 2016, Val Morgan Cinema launched CineTAM PLUS, adding depth to their audience profiling and data capabilities. It delivers cinema audience data including ‘movie going’ and media habits as well as insights into category and entertainment preferences.

In 2019, a joint venture was formed to advertise on cinema screens in Saudi Arabia, as part of the group's expansion across the Middle East.

In 2020, Val Morgan Cinema launched CineTAM Live, fusing in exhibitor ticket sales and de-personalised cinema loyalty programme transaction data and insights from Roy Morgan’s Single Source database.

== VMO ==
VMO (formerly known as Val Morgan Outdoor) is the group's outdoor advertising arm, It was first established in 2003, originally as Outpost Media, starting as a 100% digital outdoor company in Victoria specialising in retail screens. In 2008, it was acquired by Pacific Equity Partners (PEP) and merged into the HOYTS Group, forming part of the broader Val Morgan Group.

In 2012, Val Morgan Outdoor acquired PumpTV, which had a number of screens installed in service stations across Australia, expanding the group's presence in outdoor advertising.

In 2014, Val Morgan Outdoor launched an office tower network in New Zealand.

Val Morgan Outdoor also launched DART (Digital Outdoor Audience in Real Time) - the first audience measurement system to use Audience Measurement Device (AMD) technology for real-time reporting in out-of-home media. Val Morgan Outdoor later launched DART 2.0 in November 2016, expanding the platform’s capabilities around demographic and engagement measurement.

In March 2016, Val Morgan Outdoor rebranded to VMO.

In 2017, VMO launched its programmatic offering, allowing advertisers to target specific demographics in real time across its outdoor networks.

In August 2024, VMO launched a retail media network across New Zealand. The following month, VMO further expanded with the launch of an office media network across Australia.

== Val Morgan Digital ==
Val Morgan Digital was the digital publishing arm of the Val Morgan Group, which formally launched in November 2020 to house their in-house publication The Latch as well as existing partnerships with publishers.

The group made their first venture into digital publishing in January 2019 after entering a partnership with Fandom. In March 2020, Val Morgan launched The Latch, an entertainment, lifestyle, beauty and wellness website.

In November 2020, Val Morgan partnered with Group Nine Media to launch Thrillist Australia in 2021. The partnership with Group Nine Media expanded in 2021, with Val Morgan Digital acquiring the Australian license to POPSUGAR.

In June 2023, Val Morgan Digital entered a partnership with BuzzFeed Inc. to represent BuzzFeed and Tasty, editorially and commercially, in Australia and New Zealand. In December 2023, Val Morgan Digital acquired the Australian and New Zealand licence to LADbible Group, as part of a 5-year strategic commercial partnership.

In November 2025, Val Morgan Digital acquired the Australian and New Zealand licence for Vox Media’s portfolio of titles, including Curbed, Eater, Grub Street, Intelligencer, New York Magazine, Punch, SB Nation, The Cut, The Dodo, The Strategist, The Verge, Thrillist, Vox and Vulture.

The Latch, the group's only wholly-owned publication, was shut down in October 2025.

In March 2026, Val Morgan Digital was sold to Vinyl Group for $7 million in cash and $3.5 million in shares. Following the sale, the Val Morgan Group and Vinyl Media formed a partnership covering cross-selling opportunities across outdoor and cinema advertising.

== See also ==
- List of oldest companies in Australia
