= Vampr =

Social discovery platform

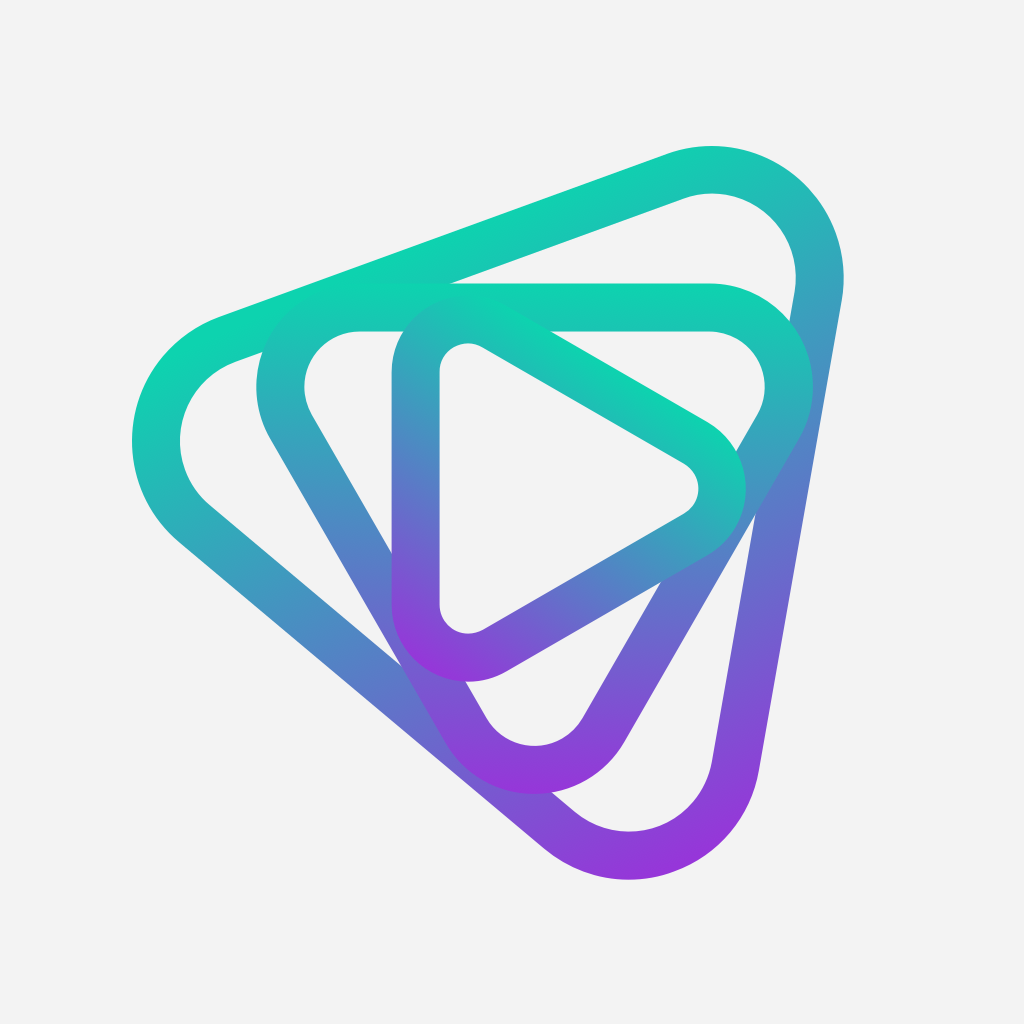
- Founded: 2015; 11 years ago
- Headquarters: Henderson, Nevada, US
- Area served: Global
- Owner: Vinyl Group
- Founders: Josh Simons; Barry Palmer
- CEO: Josh Simons
- Industry: Software
- Website: vampr.me

Vampr
- Developer: Vampr Inc.
- Release: May 2016; 10 years ago
- Operating system: Apple iOS (iOS 15.6 or later), Android (7.0 or later)
- Available in: 9 languages
- List of languages: English; French; Italian; Japanese; Portuguese; Russian; Simplified Chinese; Spanish; Turkish
- Type: Geosocial networking
- License: Proprietary software
- Website: vampr.me

Vampr is a location-based social and professional networking platform which facilitates music discovery, collaboration, and communication between musicians, creatives, industry professionals, and fans. It was founded by musicians Josh Simons and Barry Palmer. The platform was acquired by Vinyl Group in June 2023.

== History ==
The startup was founded in Los Angeles in 2015 by Australian musicians Josh Simons of Buchanan, and Barry Palmer of Hunters & Collectors. According to The Australian Financial Review, the company received seed funding from Nick Feldman of British band Wang Chung. Apple named the app in its "Best of 2017" list.

In August 2019, the company launched an equity crowdfunding campaign on Wefunder which saw the company reach their minimum fund-raising target in the first hour. In a follow-on oversubscribed crowdfunding round, the company raised the maximum permitted in a 12-month window at the time, with over 2,000 investors. Vampr would also be the first company in the world to offer investors an NFT as a perk in a Reg CF funding round.

The company later launched Vampr Publishing in 2020, a free music sync representation solution for all users, in addition to Vampr Distribution, a tiered music distribution solution which also comes bundled with the premium Vampr Pro subscription service.

In September 2021, the company announced a milestone of one million users.

In March 2022, with over 7 million professional connections brokered on the platform worldwide, Fast Company inducted Vampr into their Most Innovative Companies list. Later that year Google Play would spotlight Vampr in their Top 150 apps in the United States.

In April 2022, the company launched Vampr Academy, an edtech streaming solution for artists, allowing users to watch video lessons taught by industry experts. In November 2022, the company announced a strategic investment from Downtown Music which coincided with the launch of Vampr Marketing, a promotional advertising solution which enables artists to drive traffic to their music releases on premium websites such as Billboard, Forbes, GQ Magazine and Rolling Stone.

In February 2023, it was announced Vampr had been acquired by the Sydney-headquartered music credits database, Jaxsta, rebranding as Vinyl Group, headed by CEO Josh Simons, in December of that year.

== Description ==
The platform is a social and professional networking platform which facilitates music discovery, collaboration, and communication between musicians, creatives, industry professionals, and fans.

== See also ==
- MySpace
- SoundCloud
- LinkedIn
