= Caroline Kennedy-McCracken =

Australian musician, artist (born 1967)

- Born: Caroline Frances Kennedy; 1967 (age 58–59); Melbourne, Victoria, Australia
- Occupations: Singer-songwriter, musician, visual artist
- Years active: 1989–present
- Labels: Temptation, Mushroom, White Label, Festival Mushroom
- Formerly of: The Plums, Deadstar, Salon Baby, The Tulips, Mick Turner, The Tren Brothers

Caroline Frances Kennedy-McCracken (born Caroline Frances Kennedy in 1967) is an Australian musician and visual artist. Kennedy-McCracken has been a singer-songwriter and guitarist in several bands, including The Plums (1992–1995), Deadstar (1995–2001) and The Tulips (2002–2006). In 2013, she appeared as a vocalist on Don't Tell The Driver, a solo album by the Dirty Three's Mick Turner. Kennedy-McCracken is also a visual artist, working primarily as a painter and sculptor.

== Biography ==
Caroline Frances Kennedy was born in Melbourne and became Kennedy-McCracken upon marrying musician Pete McCracken. She has pursued parallel careers in music and in visual arts.

=== Artist ===
Kennedy-McCracken's works combine painting, drawing, installation, sculpture, and music. She was short-listed for The Siemens-RMIT Fine Art Awards in 2009, for her piece Notation.

=== Musician ===
Caroline Kennedy-McCracken has performed in and with a number of Australian bands and artists, including The Plums, Deadstar and The Tulips, as well as performing under her own name. At the ARIA Music Awards of 2005, the electronic group Deepface were nominated for 'Best Dance Release' for their single, "Been Good", which Kennedy-McCracken co-wrote.

Kennedy-McCracken has sung on records by Crow and Charlie Marshall and The Body Electric, and on Kim Salmon and the Surrealists' album, Ya Gotta Let Me Do My Thing . In 2009 she collaborated with Mick Turner and Jim White of The Dirty Three on The Tren Brothers' single, "Sometimes", and in 2013 sang on Turner's album, Don't Tell the Driver.

==== The Plums ====
In 1992, Kennedy-McCracken formed indie pop four-piece The Plums with guitarist Steve Moffat and drummer Shamus Goble; all three had previously played in the band Jack and the Beanstalk. They were joined by Pete McCracken on bass guitar. According to rock music historian Ian McFarlane, "The Plums mixed strident guitar riffs with melodic pop roots. Kennedy was the band's focal point with her tough-but-graceful presence, opinionated views and emotion-charged, if imperfect, vocals".

The band released two EPs on Mushroom's Temptation label, Au Revoir Sex Kitten and Read All Over. The album Gun followed in 1994. The band's final recording was the Heavenly EP, released in 1995. The band broke up the same year.

==== Deadstar ====
In 1995, Kennedy-McCracken joined pop group Deadstar as vocalist. Deadstar, initially a side-project for drummer Peter Jones and Hunters and Collectors guitarist Barry Palmer, included, at different times, ex-Crowded House bass guitarist Nick Seymour, Michael den Elzen (guitar, ex-Schnell Fenster), and Pete McCracken.

Palmer invited Kennedy to write melodies and lyrics over tracks of guitar music he had recorded for a projected short film, The Baby Bath Massacre. The tracks formed the basis of the band's debut eponymous album, released in 1996. Deadstar released two more studio albums, Milk (1997) and Somewhere Over the Radio (1999) on Mushroom's White Label Records.

At the ARIA Music Awards of 1997 Deadstar were nominated for 'Best Independent Release' for their single, "Don't It Get You Down". At the ARIA Music Awards of 1999 the band was again nominated, this time for 'Best Pop Release' for their single "Run Baby Run". At the ARIA Music Awards of 2000, Deadstar were nominated for 'Best Rock Album' for Somewhere Over the Radio.

In 2000 the band's single "Deeper Water" peaked at No. 28 on the ARIA Singles Chart. The group disbanded in 2001. In 2004 a compilation album, The Definitive Collection, was issued by Festival Mushroom.

==== The Tulips ====
In 2002, Kennedy-McCracken formed a country duo with Pete McCracken. The group released an eponymous EP, and in 2003 the album In the Honeycone, on Belmore Records. The band's second album, 'Free Like a Bird', would eventually be self-released, initially as The Tulips and then as Caroline No.

==== Caroline No! ====
Kennedy-McCracken has been recording as a solo artist under the moniker Caroline No since 2012.

==== The Tren Brothers and Mick Turner ====
In 2009 Kennedy-McCracken collaborated with Mick Turner and Jim White of The Dirty Three on The Tren Brothers single "Sometimes". In 2013, she sang on Turner's acclaimed solo album, Don't Tell the Driver.

== Discography ==
=== Albums ===
The Plums

- Gun (Mushroom Records/White Label Records, 1994)

Deadstar

- Deadstar (Mushroom Records/White Label Records, 1996)
- Milk (Mushroom Records/White Label Records, 1997)
- Somewhere Over the Radio (Mushroom Records/White Label Records, 1997)
- The Definitive Collection (Festival Mushroom Records, 2004)

The Tulips

- In the Honeycone (Belmore Records, 2003)

=== EPs ===
The Plums

- Au Revoir Sex Kitten (Temptation, 1992)
- Read All Over (Temptation, 1993)
- Heavenly (Mushroom Records/White Label Records, 1995)

The Tulips

- The Tulips (Shock, 2002)

=== Singles ===
The Plums

- "Find this Anywhere" (Mushroom Records/White Label Records)

Deadstar

- "Going Down" (1996)
- "She Loves She" (1996)
- "Sister" (1996)
- "Don't It Get You Down?" ( 1996)
- "I've Got Something to Tell You" (1997)
- "Run Baby Run" (1999)
- "Deeper Water" (1999)
- "Somewhere Over the Radio" (May 2000)
