= List of songs about nuclear war =

Songs with a theme of nuclear war have been a feature of popular culture since the early years of the Cold War.

Song name	Artists and albums	Year	Ref.
4 Minute Warning	Radiohead	2007	
137	Brand New	2017	
1983... (A Merman I Should Turn to Be)	Jimi Hendrix	1968	
1999	Prince	1982	
2 Minutes to Midnight	Iron Maiden	1984	
540,000 Degrees Fahrenheit	Fear Factory	2005	
30000 Megatons	Pond	2016	
99 Luftballons	Nena	1983	
A Blue Wave	Cleaners From Venus	1981	
Adrian	Eurythmics	1985	
A Flash in the Night	Secret Service	1982	
After the Fall	Klaus Nomi	1982	
After the Flood	Van Der Graaf Generator	1970	
After the Holocaust	Nuclear Assault	1986	
After the War	Asia	1985	
Aftermath	Armored Saint	1985	
Aftershock	Anthrax	1985	
All Fall Down	B-Movie	1991	
Always the Sun	The Stranglers	1986	
America	Kurtis Blow	1986	
American Soviets	CCCP	1990	
Poem for a Nuclear Romance	Anne Clark	1983	
Apocalypso	Mental as Anything	1986	
Apocalypso	The Lords of the New Church	1982	
April 2031	Warrant	1992	
Arise	Sepultura	1991	
Armageddon Days (Are Here Again)	The The	1989	
As the End Draws Near	Manufacture Feat. Sarah McLachlan	1988	
As the World Burns	Bolt Thrower	1992	
As the World Caves In	Matt Maltese	2017	
Atom and Evil	Heaven and Hell	2009	
Atom Bomb	Fluke	1996	
Atom Bomb	Glenn Barber	1955	
Atom Bomb Baby	The Five Stars	1957	
Atom Drum Bop	The Three Johns	1986	
Atom Tan	The Clash	1982	
Atomic	Blondie	1980	
Atomic Dog	George Clinton and the P-Funk All-Stars	1982	
Atomic Playboys	Steve Stevens	1989	
Back to Zero	The Rolling Stones	1986	
Beat Street	Grandmaster Flash and the Furious Five	1984	
Beneath the Remains	Sepultura	1989	
Between the Wheels	Rush	1984	
Beyond the Black	Metal Church	1984	
Bikini Red	The Screaming Blue Messiahs	1987	
Billy's Line	Red Box	1986	
Birthright	Anderson, Bruford, Wakeman, Howe	1989	
Black Celebration	Depeche Mode	1986	
Black Planet	The Sisters of Mercy	1985	
Blackened	Metallica	1988	
Blossom and Blood	Midnight Oil	1985	
Blow the House Down	Siouxsie and the Banshees	1984	
Blowin' Sky High	Berlin	1988	
Bombers	David Bowie	1971	
Another Bomb	Gang Green	1987	
The Bomb Song	Darwin Deez	2010	
Bombe the Russians	Fear	1985	
Boom!	System of a Down, on the album Steal This Album!	2002	
Boom Box	Vitabeats	1985	
Breathing	Kate Bush	1980	
Brighter Than A Thousand Suns	Iron Maiden	2006	
Bring Back the Bomb	Gwar	2004	
Brush the Dust from That Old Bible	Bradley Kincaid	1950	
Burning Heart	Survivor	1985	
Can't Stop Running	Space Monkey	2002	
The Catalyst	Linkin Park	2010	
Channel-Z	The B-52's	1989	
Chemical Bomb	Aquabats	1999	
Chemical Warfare	Slayer	1983	
Children Of The Grave	Black Sabbath	1971	
Christmas at Ground Zero	"Weird Al" Yankovic	1986	
Claude Rains	The Front Lawn	1989	
Clean, Clean	Bruce Woolley and the Camera Club / The Buggles	1979	
Cloudburst at Shingle St.	Thomas Dolby	1982	
Come Away Melinda	Bobbie Gentry	1968	
Countdown to Extinction	Megadeth	1992	
Countdown to Zero	Asia	1985	
Crawl Out Through the Fallout	Sheldon Allman	1960	
Cries of Help	Discharge	1982	
Cruise	David Gilmour	1984	
Cruise Missiles	Fischer-Z	1981	
Cuando Seas Grande	Miguel Mateos	1993	
Curfew	The Stranglers	1978	
Current Events	Joe King Carrasco and the Crowns	1998	
Dancing With Tears in My Eyes	Ultravox	1984	
Dangerous Moments	Martin Briley	1985	
Dawn Patrol	Megadeth	1990	
The Day After	The Men They Couldn't Hang	1985	
The Dead Next Door	Billy Idol	1983	
De Bom	Doe Maar	1983	
De Bom Valt Nooit	Herman van Veen	1984	
Def.Con.One	Pop Will Eat Itself	1992	
Destruction Preventer	Sonata Arctica	1999	
Dig a Hole in the Ground	Fred Small	2011	
Distant Early Warning	Rush	1984	
Domino	Genesis	1986	
Don't Crash	Front 242	1987	
Do the Evolution	Pearl Jam	1998	
Do You Believe in the Westworld?	Theatre of Hate	1982	
Down from the Sky	Trivium	2008	
Downer	Nirvana	1988	
Dream Home in New Zealand	The Beat	1981	
Dream Told	Minutemen	1983	
Earth Crusher	Mr. Lif	2002	
Eighth Day	Hazel O'Connor	1980	
Einstein A Go Go	Landscape	1981	
Einstein on the Beach (For an Eggman)	Counting Crows	1994	
Electric Funeral	Black Sabbath	1970	
End of the World	Gary Moore	1981	
The End	Discharge	1981	
Enola Gay	OMD	1980	
Epitaph	King Crimson	1969	
Euroshima	John Waite	1984	
Eve of Destruction	Barry McGuire	1965	
Everybody Have Fun Tonight	Wang Chung	1986	
Everybody Wants to Rule the World	Tears for Fears	1985	
Everyday Is Like Sunday	Morrissey	1988	
Fabulous Disaster	Exodus	1989	
Fact And Fiction	Twelfth Night	1982	
Fallout	Data	1980	
Famous Last Words	Tears for Fears	1989	
Fight Fire with Fire	Metallica	1984	
The Final Bloodbath	Discharge	1982	
Final Day	Young Marble Giants	1980	
Fire in the Sky	Saxon	1981	
Fireside Favourite	Fad Gadget	1980	
Firestorm	Leslie Fish	1989	
Five Years	David Bowie	1972	
Flame of the West	Big Country	1984	
Flyingdale Flyer	Jethro Tull	1980	
Forever Young	Alphaville	1984	
Four Minute Warning	Mark Owen	2003	
Four Minutes	Culture Shock	1989	
Four Minutes	Roger Waters	1987	
Folded Flags	Roger Waters	1986	
French Letters	Herbs	1987	
The Future's So Bright, I Gotta Wear Shades	Timbuk3	1986	
Games Without Frontiers	Peter Gabriel	1980	
Glad It's All Over	Captain Sensible	1994	
Grandpa Atomic	New Bomb Turks	1994	
The Great Atomic Power	The Louvin Brothers	1962	
Ground B Sound	Death Piggy	1999	
Ground Zero Brooklyn	Carnivore	1987	
The Gunner's Dream- Paranoid Eyes	Pink Floyd	1983	
Guns in the Sky	INXS	1987	
Hallowed Ground	Violent Femmes	1984	
Hammer to Fall	Queen	1984	
Happy Birthday	"Weird Al" Yankovic	1983	
Harrisburg	Midnight Oil	1985	
Heat	Leslie Spit Treeo	1990	
Heatwave	Fay Ray	1982	
A Hell On Earth	Discharge	1982	
He Looks Like Spencer Tracy Now	Deacon Blue	1987	
Help Save the Youth of America	Billy Bragg	1986	
Hercules	Midnight Oil	1992	
Here Comes President Kill Again	XTC	1989	
Heresy	Rush	1991	
Hiroshima	Gary Moore	1983	
Hiroshima	Sandra (originally by Wishful Thinking)	1990	
Hiroshima	Utopia	1977	
Hiroshima Nagasaki Russian Roulette	Jim Page	1976	
Hiroshima Nagasaki Russian Roulette	Moving Hearts	1981	
Hiroshima, Mon Amour	Ultravox	1977	
House at Pooneil Corners	Jefferson Airplane	1968	
Human Error	Subhumans	1981	
I.C.B.M.	Amebix	1987	
I Come and Stand at Every Door	The Byrds	1966	
I Don't Wanna Die	4 Skins	1982	
I Found That Essence Rare	Gang of Four	1979	
Ignorance	Sacred Reich	1987	
I Melt with You	Modern English	1982	
In the Hole	Armored Saint	1985	
Invasion	Skrewdriver	1984	
I Remember the Sun	XTC	1984	
Is There Something I Should Know?	Duran Duran	1981	
It's a Mistake	Men At Work	1983	
I've Known No War	The Who	1982	
I Won't Let the Sun Go Down on Me	Nik Kershaw	1984	
Janitor	Suburban Lawns	1980	
Just Another Day	Oingo Boingo	1985	
Jesus Hits Like the Atomic Bomb	Lowell Blanchard and the Vally Trio	1998	
Juggernaut	Frank Marino & Mahogany Rush	1982	
Kill for Peace	The Fugs	1966	
Kill the Poor	Dead Kennedys	1978	
Killer of Giants	Ozzy Osbourne	1986	
Kinky Sex Makes the World Go Round	Dead Kennedys	1982	
King of the World	Steely Dan	1973	
La Java des bombes atomiques	Boris Vian	1955	
La Paix sur terre	Jean Ferrat	1991	
Land of Confusion	Genesis	1986	
Last Domino	Genesis	1986	
Last in the House of Flames	UK Decay	1981	
Lawyers in Love	Jackson Browne	1983	
Leave in Silence	Depeche Mode	1982	
Leningrad	Billy Joel	1989	
Let Me Die In My Footsteps	Bob Dylan	1963	
Let's All Make A Bomb	Heaven 17	1981	
Let's Have A War	Fear	1982	
Let's Talk About it	Dweezil Zappa	1986	
Life During Wartime	Talking Heads	1979	
Listen	Tears For Fears	1985	
Live Fast, Die Young	Circle Jerks	1980	
Living Through Another Cuba	XTC	1980	
Lock and Key	Rush	1987	
London Calling	The Clash	1979	
Love Missile F1-11	Sigue Sigue Sputnik	1986	
Lovers in a Dangerous Time	Bruce Cockburn	1984	
M.A.D.	Hadouken!, lyrics and title refer to nuclear war; the whole album's and lyrics refer to atomic war	2009	
Man at C&A	The Specials	1980	
Manhattan Project	Rush	1985	
Maralinga	Urban Guerrillas	1983	
Massive Retaliation	Sigue Sigue Sputnik	1986	
Mediate	INXS	1987	
Merry Minuet	Kingston Trio	1959	
Missiles	The Sound	1980	
Morning Dew	Bonnie Dobson; also recorded by Jeff Beck, Blackfoot, Einstürzende Neubauten, Tim Rose, and The Grateful Dead	1962	
Mutually Assured Destruction (M.A.D.)	Gillan	1986	
Nagasaki Nightmare	Crass	1981	
New Frontier	Donald Fagen	1982	
No Nuclear War	Peter Tosh	1987	
North Korea Polka	"Weird Al" Yankovic	2017	
North Winds Blowing	The Stranglers	1985	
Nuclear	Mike Oldfield	2014	
Nuclear Attack	Gary Moore	1981	
Nuclear Attack	Sabaton	2006	
Nuclear Cop	Redgum	1980	
Nuclear Sunrise	Hand of Fire	2017	
Nuclear War	The Sun Ra Arkestra	1982	
Nuclear War	New Politics	2010	
Nuclear War	Yo La Tengo	2001	
Oblivion	Dirty Rotten Imbeciles	1987	
Old Man Atom	Sons of the Pioneers	1950	
On the Beach	The Comsat Angels	1980	
One of the Living	Tina Turner, on the Mad Max Beyond Thunderdome	1985	
Paranoid Chant	Minutemen	1980	
Party at Ground Zero	Fishbone	1985	
Pink World	Planet P Project	1984	
Planet Earth	Duran Duran	1981	
Political Science	Randy Newman	1972	
Pride of Man	Hamilton Camp	1964	
Pronto viviremos en la Luna	Víctor Manuel	1984	
Protect and Survive	Runrig	1987	
Put Down That Weapon	Midnight Oil	1987	
Quite Unusual	Front 242	1987	
Radiation Sickness	Nuclear Assault	1986	
Radioactive Toy	Porcupine Tree	1992	
Red Rain	Peter Gabriel	1986	
Red Shadows	T.S.O.L.	1984	
Red Skies	The Fixx	1982	
Red Skies over Paradise	Fischer-Z	1981	
Ronnie Talk to Russia	Prince	1981	
Russians	Sting	1985	
Rust in Peace... Polaris	Megadeth	1990	
S.D.I.	Loudness	1987	
Seconds	U2	1982	
Set the World Afire	Megadeth	1988	
Shattered	Pantera	1990	
Skeletons of Society	Slayer	1990	
Sign o' the Times	Prince	1987	
So Long, and Thanks for All the Fish	A Perfect Circle	2018	
So Long, Mom (A Song for World War III)	Tom Lehrer	1965	
Soviet Snow	Shona Laing	1987	
The Stage	Avenged Sevenfold	2016	
Stagnation	Genesis	1970	
Stop the World	The Clash	1980	
Strike Zone	Loverboy	1983	
The Sun Is Burning	Ian Campbell	1963	
Summer of ‘81	Mondo Rock	1981	
Sunrise	Icehouse	1987	
Survive	Nuclear Assault	1988	
Survivor's Song	Julia Ecklar	1986	
Talkin' World War III Blues	Bob Dylan	1963	
The Apple Tree	Difford & Tilbrook	1984	
The Temptation of Adam	Josh Ritter	2007	
Thank Christ for The Bomb	Groundhogs	1970	
Thank God for The Bomb	Ozzy Osbourne	1986	
The Sun Is Burning	Simon & Garfunkel	1964	
This World Over	XTC	1984	
Time After Time	Electric Light Orchestra	1983	
Time Will Crawl	David Bowie	1987	
Total Eclipse	Klaus Nomi	1981	
Town to Town	Microdisney	1987	
Tropicana	Gruppo Italiano	2002	
Twilight Gods	Helloween	1987	
Two Minute Warning	Depeche Mode	1983	
Two Suns In the Sunset	Pink Floyd	1983	
Two Tribes	Frankie Goes to Hollywood	1984	
Vamos a la Playa	Righeira	1983	
Vaporized	X-15	1981	
Victims of the Future	Gary Moore	1983	
Walk the Dinosaur	Was (Not Was)	1987	
Walking in Your Footsteps	The Police	1983	
The Wanderer	U2 and Johnny Cash	1993	
Warhead	Tarot	1997	
Warhead	UK Subs	1980	
We Don't Want No Nuclear War	Peter Tosh	1987	
We Will All Go Together When We Go	Tom Lehrer	1959	
We Will Become Silhouettes	The Postal Service	2005	
What Have They Done	Squeeze	1986	
When the Wind Blows	David Bowie	1986	
White Train	Bananarama	1986	
Will The Sun Rise?	Dokken	1985	
Wind of Change	Scorpions	1991	
Wooden Ships	Crosby, Stills & Nash	1969	
World Destruction	Time Zone	1984	
World War III	D.O.A.	1979	
World Wars III & IV	Carnivore	1985	
Wernher von Braun	Tom Lehrer	1965	
Who's Next?	Tom Lehrer	1965	
