= The Urban Guerillas =

Australian pub rock band

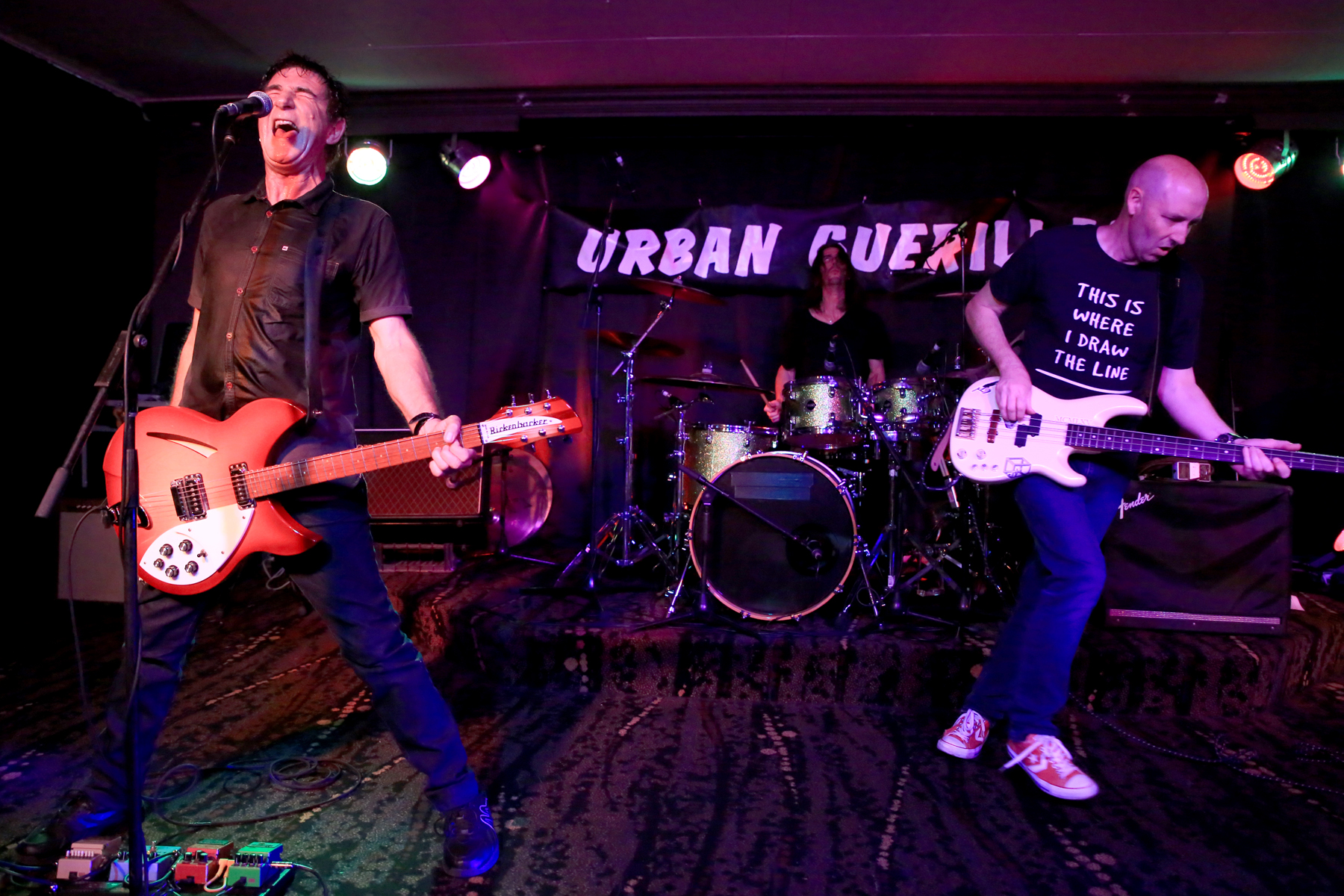
- The Urban Guerillas performing at the Beaches Hotel in Thirroul, New South Wales, 2016

Background information
- Origin: Adelaide, South Australia, Australia
- Genres: Pub rock, Punk rock
- Years active: 1981–present
- Label: Watchful Eye
- Members: Ken Stewart (guitar / vocals); Michael Elsley (drums / vocals); Phil Paviour (bass / vocals)
- Website: urbanguerillas.com

The Urban Guerillas are an Australian pub rock band. Originally formed in Adelaide, the band is currently based in Sydney.

== Beginnings 1981 ==
Influenced by Punk, The Urban Guerillas was formed in Adelaide in 1980 as a trio with Ken Stewart (guitar/vocals), Terry Burgan (bass/vocals) and John Martin (drums). Terry and John had recently moved to Adelaide from Whyalla. After playing their brand of original pop / punk rock music around Adelaide for a little over two years and releasing two independent cassettes, the band moved to Sydney where they fit into the live pub circuit.

== Sydney 1983–1987 ==
In 1983 they went into Studios 301 to record and released the song 1984 on their own label, The single sold in enough quantities to attract the attention of George Wayne from Triple J who invited the band into the Australian Broadcasting Corporation studios to play live to air. In 1984 they recorded a more pop-oriented single, She's Probably, produced by Adelaide guitarist Mal Eastick from Stars (Australian band) and producer of the Andy Durant Memorial Concert. This single won numerous favourable reviews around the country and gave the band a boost around Sydney before a membership reshuffle took some time to consolidate the new four-piece line up. The band resurfaced nationally in 1986 with their Borrowed Time EP and an appearance on a nationally televised talent quest Star Search (Australia). During this time the Urban Guerillas played regularly at the Sandringham (Sando) and until Roaring Jack entered the scene, had held the over-the-bar record of takings at the famous inner west hotel. (The Roaring Jack crowd consistently managed to out-drink the Urban Guerillas punters). The band toured nationally in 1986 mostly headlining but also playing some notable supports with The Saints, The Hitmen, the New Christs and Spy vs Spy. In 1987 the band released their signature tune Here Come the Americans. An anthem against the Americanisation of Australian culture. Using a war analogy for the cultural invasion gave the song a literal interpretation that resonated with the peace movement. The song gave the Urban Guerillas a provocative edge and the renewed attention from the media delivered access to the suburban venues. Through various line-up changes the band experimented and consistently fronted up as an energetic and formidable live performance unit until the end of 1987, when after much touring and having all their gear stolen, the Guerillas had imploded.

== Another View 1988–1990 ==
In 1988 Stewart played solo in addition to supporting Roaring Jack whilst putting together another three piece. This outfit toured to Melbourne, Canberra and Adelaide frequently and the suburban bars in Sydney but their regular work became to an abrupt end when Stewart fell off the drum-kit while playing guitar during a gig in Oatley, breaking his wrist. However, before the accident the Urban Guerillas had managed to record their first album, Another View, in 1989 with Phil Punch at Electric Avenue studio and released it in 1990 to critical acclaim.

== Funky Zoo ==
Ken worked with new bass player Phil Paviour to write a children's musical around a song, The Funky Zoo, that Ken had written. Enlisting musicians from other bands that they had played with. Ken assembled a cast and put the Funky Zoo on in Bondi Pavilion Theatre in 1992. It was immediately recognised and booked for a week of shows at Tumbalong park, Darling Harbour, for the Festival of Sydney 1993. After 30 live shows, the "Funky Zoo" song was nominated for the APRA Award for Children's Composition of the Year in 1993 (but lost to "Tigers Roaring in the Afternoon" by former Play School presenter Monica Trapaga). In 2008 the Funky Zoo returned to the stage in Sydney, this time, using professional actors. The show was relaunched at Bondi Pavilion, where it began, followed by a week of shows at the Newtown Neighbourhood Centre in Newtown, including an appearance at the Newtown Festival. During 2009 and 2010 the Funky Zoo spread its environmental message to sell out shows far and wide throughout Sydney suburbs and regional NSW.

== Recording and touring 1995–2002 ==
In 1995 with Just a Lifetime getting airplay, the band again played regularly around Sydney in various line-ups while releasing the Mad in Australia EP CD in 1997. In 1998 the Urban Guerillas performed on the docks for the maritime workers who were striking to save their jobs in the 1998 Australian waterfront dispute. The band released two CD albums Carols by Blowtorch and Cloud Above my Head in 1999. In 2001 the Urban Guerillas released their Big Brother single and began touring interstate again. Through 2002 the band extensively toured the outback including regional Northern Territory and South Australia, twice touring the remote outback and desert townships of central Australia including Alice Springs.

== Political activism ==
The Urban Guerillas were chosen to perform at Euro-region Camp 2000 for young Europeans visiting Australia during the 2000 Summer Olympics to study Antipodean social structure and culture. Over the years, apart from their appearances in hotels and venues throughout Australia, the Urban Guerillas have played at Sydney Airport to 6,000 workers stranded when Ansett Australia collapsed, Peace Rallies in Sydney and Brisbane, No Racism, No War Rally to 50,000 people in the Domain, Corroboree Sovereignty for indigenous rights at the Aboriginal Tent Embassy in Canberra, Woomera Immigration Reception and Processing Centre 2002 Festival of Freedoms, May Day celebrations of workers rights, NAIDOC celebrations and the Hiroshima Never Again Rally commemorating those who died as a result of the Atomic bombings of Hiroshima and Nagasaki. The Urban Guerillas have also played for the M1 Alliance, S11 (protest) in Melbourne, Greenpeace, the Australian Conservation Foundation and The Wilderness Society (Australia) and Labor Council of New South Wales and Rock for Rights to 40,000 people at the Sydney Cricket Ground in 2007 sharing the stage with The Screaming Jets, Hoodoo Gurus, Dallas Crane, Kev Karmody, Missy Higgins, Tex Perkins and Youthgroup. The Urban Guerillas historically played on Cockatoo Island (New South Wales) with Roaring Jack in 1989 and played on the pickets at Port Botany for the Maritime Union of Australia in 1998 to support workers at threat of losing their jobs. In 2008 they played at the 10 years on from the Maritime Union of Australia waterfront dispute "MUA Here to Stay" concert and against the Asia-Pacific Economic Cooperation forum on the back of a truck in Sydney's CBD.

== Outback and regional Australia tour 2006 ==
In October 2006 the Urban Guerillas returned to outback and regional Australia starting from Adelaide and touring to Pimba, Roxby Downs, Coober Pedy, Alice Springs, Oodnadatta, Pt Augusta, Streaky Bay, Iron Knob, Pt Pirie, Leigh Creek, Broken Hill, Cobar and Nyngan, this time aided by funding through a grant from the Federal Government and Music NSW to introduce their Every Generation single which promptly received airplay on Triple J.

== 2007 to 2015 ==
In 2007, the CD album ...and the wind brought change was released inspired by the social impact on America of Hurricane Katrina. Described as a mix of down-and-out aggression with a peaceful social-conscience the album reinforced the perception about the band's tough musical flexibility and outspoken lyrical content. In 2010 the Urban Guerillas performed at the Alistair Hulett Memorial concert along with a collection of bands and artists that had worked closely with him and Roaring Jack. In 2012 the band played sporadically live while concentrating on new material for their next studio album. The 2014 single release of Rise Up and Ballad of Ned Kelly was the band's first release since 2007. The video of Rise Up was promptly posted on the Green Left Weekly web site. On 6 August 2015, just before midnight, Hutchison Ports, located in Sydney and Brisbane, sacked 97 workers by text message and email – 57 in Sydney and 40 in Brisbane This prompted the Urban Guerillas to perform again on the Hutchison Ports docks to support Australian workers keeping jobs. In November 2015 the band released a 5 track EP album My Kind after which Ken went for the Rickenbacker guitar and a Vox AC30 amplifier combo giving the band more edge and jangle.

== 2016 to 2018 ==
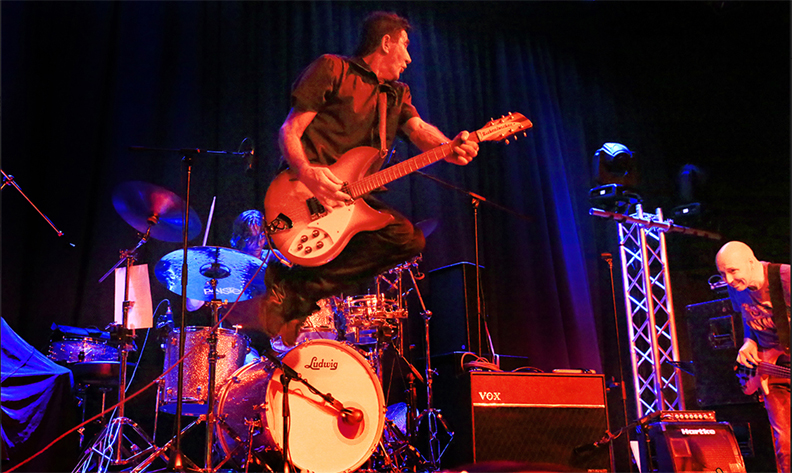
Urban Guerillas at Dee Why RSL 2016 pic by Alec Smart

In 2016, the Urban Guerillas teamed up with Spy vs. Spy (band) and toured around Sydney suburbs and regional towns in NSW. In 2017 the Urban Guerillas released a single "No Walls" inspired in part by the newly elected President of the USA boasting about building a wall between Mexico and the United States. Toward the end of the year the band released a song "Guerilla Radio" as an EP. The song had become their signature tune and explained what to expect from the Urban Guerillas in style and substance. The EP was chosen in the Top 10 releases in 2017 by 2RRR Sounds of Sydney DJ Big Daddy K. The band was taking their music to the streets and played on the docks for the Maritime Union in support of sailors and dockers fighting for their jobs while their union was under attack by Australia's anti-union conservative government. They also performed on the back of a truck at the Hiroshima Day commemoration and nuclear protest rallies in Sydney's Hyde Park. In January 2018 Stewart plays to a demonstration in Martin Place imploring the government to fix Sydney's public transport system In April the band played at the M-Club in Maroubra for the Maritime Union of Australia to commemorate 20 years on from the 1998 Waterfront dispute. The Urban Guerillas played on the docks to support the strikers during that dispute. The band played their last gig supporting Michael Weiley's Spy V Spy at the Caringbah Hotel in Sydney's south. Michael had taken ill. He never recovered and tragically died in September. The Guerillas toured to Melbourne and Adelaide releasing two digital singles throughout the year, “What I Wish For” and their version of a Small Faces classic “Afterglow (of your love)”

== 2019 to 2024 ==
Spy V Spy regroup around Cliff Grigg and join the Urban Guerillas, The Radiators (Australian band) and Gang Gajang in a tribute to Michael Weiley at the Hawkesbury Hotel in Windsor in Sydney's north west. The Guerillas and the new Spy V Spy lineup teamed up to continue their joint attack. The Urban Guerillas played at the Tote in Melbourne before joining the Spies in Tasmania. More gigs in Sydney and regional NSW followed with the Urban Guerillas releasing their “Equation of Life” CD at the Petersham Bowling Club. The fire season impacts gigs across Australia and into January 2020 before even further disruption of flooding rains. Urban Guerillas and Spy V Spy tour to Queensland in March 2020 just as news comes through that COVID-19 has become a worldwide pandemic that would threaten Australia. After a fundraiser gig for Firefighters, Australia goes into lockdown. All gigs and tours are postponed or cancelled and the live promotion of the “Equation of Life” stalls. The band releases “MRI” followed by “Bandage This Heart” during the lockdown period. In November, after 6 months lock down the NSW government underwrites COVID-19 gigs to seated audiences to kick start live gigs but the uncertainty and restrictions has an impact on all live performance work. In 2022 the COVID-19 restrictions are lifted in a piecemeal manner and major venues and tours return. Local hotel gigs are still struggling with audience reticence and cancellations. As the year unfolds the overall feeling is that Covid is still around but no longer a threat to life. The Urban Guerillas release a digital single "Hurricane" as a comment on the ongoing natural disasters throughout the land caused by climate change. The single is mostly ignored by the mainstream despite the live reputation of the band growing. To give the establishment a nudge the band released a new song on November 11 to coincide with the date Australia's reformist Prime Minister Gough Whitlam was sacked and folkloric figure Ned Kelly was hanged. Titled "They Won't Play My Song On The Radio" ironically gets played on the radio.

== Discography ==
Cassettes

| Year | Album title |
|---|---|
| 1981 | 8 Exploded Hits |
| 1983 | Urban Guerillas |
| 1984 | Take No Prisoners |

Vinyl Singles 7"

| Year | Title |
|---|---|
| 1983 | 1984 |
| 1984 | Shes Probably |
| 1987 | Here Come the Americans |
| 1989 | Better Than This |

Vinyl Albums 12"

| Year | Album title |
|---|---|
| 1986 | Borrowed Time |
| 1990 | Another View |

CD Singles

| Year | Title |
|---|---|
| 2001 | Big Brother |
| 2005 | Here Come the Americans; Just a Lifetime |
| 2006 | Every Generation |
| 2014 | Rise Up |

CD albums

| Year | Album title |
|---|---|
| 1995 | Just a Lifetime |
| 1997 | Mad in Australia |
| 1999 | Cloud Above My Head; Carols by Blowtorch |
| 2003 | Soundtrack to the Revolution |
| 2005 | Nukalyptus Surreptitious |
| 2007 | ...and the wind brought change |
| 2015 | My Kind |
| 2017 | Guerilla Radio |
| 2019 | Equation of Life |

Digital Singles

| Year | Title |
|---|---|
| 2013 | Ballad of Ned Kelly |
| 2014 | Rise Up |
| 2017 | No Walls |
| 2018 | What I Wish For |
| 2018 | Afterglow (of your love) |
| 2020 | M.R.I. |
| 2020 | Bandage This Heart |
| 2021 | So Hard |
| 2022 | Hurricane |
| 2022 | They Won't Play My Song On The Radio |
| 2024 | Wombats of Bundanoon (Funky Zoo Single) |
| 2024 | Invitation (Single) |
| 2024 | Traffic Jam (Single) |
| 2024 | Christmas Time (Single) |
| 2026 | What's Going On? (Funky Zoo Single) |

Digital Re-issues

| Year | Title |
|---|---|
| 2021 | She's Probably (Single) |
| 2021 | Here Come The Americans (Single) |
| 2023 | 1984 (Single) |
| 2023 | Big Brother (Single) |
| 2023 | Just A Lifetime (Album) |
| 2024 | 8 Exploded Hits (1981 Cassette Album) |
| 2025 | Funky Zoo (Single) |
| 2026 | The Borrowed Time (EP) |
