= APRA Music Awards of 1993 =

Annual Australian music awards

- Date: 22 November 1993
- Location: Sydney, New South Wales, Australia
- Website: apra-amcos.com.au

The Australasian Performing Right Association Awards of 1993 (generally known as APRA Awards) are a series of awards, which were held at the Regent Hotel, Sydney, in November 1993. The APRA Music Awards were presented by Australasian Performing Right Association (APRA) and the Australasian Mechanical Copyright Owners Society (AMCOS).

== Awards ==
Winners are shown in bold with known nominees shown in plain.

Category	Details	Result
Songwriter of the Year	**Greg Arnold**	Won
Ted Albert Memorial Award	**Peter Sculthorpe**	Won
Song of the Year	"**Four Seasons in One Day**" (**Neil Finn**, **Tim Finn**) by **Crowded House**	Won
Song of the Year	"Black Stick" (Gregory "Tex" Perkins, Daniel Atkins p.k.a. Dan Rumour) by The Cruel Sea	Nominated
Song of the Year	"Happy Birthday Helen" (Greg Arnold) by Things of Stone and Wood	Nominated
Song of the Year	"Lost" (Michael Spiby) by The Badloves	Nominated
Song of the Year	"You Were There" (Phil Buckle) by Southern Sons	Nominated
Country Song of the Year	"(This Is) Australia Calling" (John Williamson, A Fairbairn) by John Williamson	Nominated
Country Song of the Year	"**Boys from the Bush**" (**Lee Kernaghan**, **Garth Porter**) by **Lee Kernaghan**	Won
Country Song of the Year	"Fifteen Minutes of Fame" (C Stockley, G Young) by Cameron Daddo	Nominated
Country Song of the Year	"From Frankie with Love" (Craig Giles, R Giles, L Nelson) by Craig Giles	Nominated
Country Song of the Year	"Red Roses" (Shanley Del Gregory) by Shanley Del	Nominated
Contemporary Classical Composition of the Year	"**Symphony Da Pacem Domine**" (**Ross Edwards**) by **Ross Edwards**	Won
Children's Composition of the Year	"**Tigers Roaring in the Afternoon**" (**David Basden**, **Julian Gough**, **Monica Trapaga**) by **Monica Trapaga**	Won
Children's Composition of the Year	"Funky Zoo" (Kenneth Ian Stewart) by Ken Stewart	Nominated
Jazz Composition of the Year	"Desperados" (Bernard McGann) by Bernie McGann Trio	Nominated
Jazz Composition of the Year	"**Hindered on His Way to Heaven**" (**Vince Jones**, **Barney McAll**) by **Vince Jones** and **Barney McAll**	Won
Jazz Composition of the Year	"Just Perfect" (Steve Sedergreen) by Mistaken Identity	Nominated
Jazz Composition of the Year	"Lilac Embers" (Sandra Evans) by Clarion Fracture Zone	Nominated
Jazz Composition of the Year	"Welcome to the World of Major Crime" (Paul Grabowsky) by Paul Grabowsky	Nominated
Most Performed Foreign Work	"**You Don't Treat Me No Good**" (**Daniel Pritzker**, **Daniel Laszlo**) by **Sonia Dada**	Won
Most Performed Australian Work	"**Daddy's Gonna Make You a Star**" (**Simon Hussey**, **Jef Scott**, **James Reyne**) by **Company of Strangers**	Won
Most Performed Australian Work Overseas / Overseas Award	"**Fall At Your Feet**" (**Neil Finn**) by **Crowded House**	Won
Television or Film Score of the Year	**Romper Stomper** (**John Clifford White**) by **John Clifford White and the Romper Stomper Orchestra & Band**	Won
Television or Film Theme of the Year	**Phoenix** (Series 2) (**Paul Grabowsky**) by **Paul Grabowsky**	Won

== See also ==
- Music of Australia
