= Up in the Clouds =

Single by Darwin Deez

from the album Darwin Deez
- Released: 11 July 2010
- Recorded: 2009
- Genre: Alternative rock
- Length: 3:30
- Label: Lucky Number
- Songwriter: Darwin Smith

Darwin Deez singles chronology
"Radar Detector" (2010)	"Up in the Clouds" (2010)	"Constellations" (2010)

"Up in the Clouds" is the third single from alternative band Darwin Deez. It was released as a digital download on 11 July 2010 with a vinyl release the following day and also features on the self-titled debut album Darwin Deez. The single was added to BBC Radio 1's C Playlist in June 2010.

== Creation ==
When asked by Matt Edmondson about the motives behind the single, lead singer of the band Darwin Smith explained:

"I was in a relationship with this girl and I screwed up... I cheated on this girl and then she got really mad. So I wrote her this song. I knew it wasn't going somewhere, so I had to put the nail in the coffin."

== Track listing ==
- Digital Download

No.	Title	Length
1.	"Up in the Clouds"	3:30
2.	"Hey Mom"	4:03

== Music video ==
The music video to accompany the release of "Up in the Clouds" premiered on YouTube on 21 June 2010. It revolves around the storyline that Darwin has just broken up with his girlfriend, who is one of two air-control pilots. Despite attempting to apologise for what he has done, shown through the lyrics "I'm sorry"; the girlfriend avoids him at every cost. At the beginning of the video, Darwin steps out of the plane on to a cloud, where he spends the remainder of the video, playing on the title "Up in the Clouds". The girlfriend rejects Darwin's calls and even tampers with the flight controls so as to send Darwin falling through the sky.

== Chart performance ==
"Up in the Clouds" debuted on the UK Indie Chart at number 36 on 17 July 2010.

Chart (2010)	Peak position
UK Indie (OCC)	36

== Release history ==
Region	Date	Format
United Kingdom	11 July 2010	Digital download
United Kingdom	12 July 2010	Vinyl
