= Radar Detector (song) =

Single by Darwin Deez

from the album Darwin Deez
- Released: 25 April 2010
- Recorded: 2009
- Genre: Indie rock
- Length: 3:09
- Label: Lucky Number
- Songwriter: Darwin Deez

Darwin Deez singles chronology
"Constellations" (2009)	"Radar Detector" (2010)	"Up in the Clouds" (2010)

"Radar Detector" is the second single from alternative band Darwin Deez. It was released as a digital download on 25 April 2010 and also features on the self-titled debut album Darwin Deez.

== Track listing ==
- Digital Download

No.	Title	Length
1.	"Radar Detector"	3:09
2.	"Lights On"	1:54

== Chart performance ==
"Radar Detector" debuted on the UK Singles Chart at number 62 on 11 April 2010. On its second week in the Top 100, the single fell 8 places to number 70, marking Darwin Deez's most successful single to date, having been the only one to crack the Top 100. The single also debuted on the UK Indie Chart at number 5, where it remained for two consecutive weeks. On 25 April 2010, the single fell 3 places to number 8 before falling out of the chart on 2 May 2010. Australian station Triple J announced on January 26, 2011, that "Radar Detector" was the 28th most popular song of 2010 in its annual Hottest 100 poll.

Chart (2010)	Peak Position
UK Singles (OCC)	62
UK Indie (OCC)	5

== Release history ==
Region	Date	Format
United Kingdom	4 April 2010	Digital Download
United Kingdom	5 April 2010	Vinyl
