= Tony Carey =

American-born musician

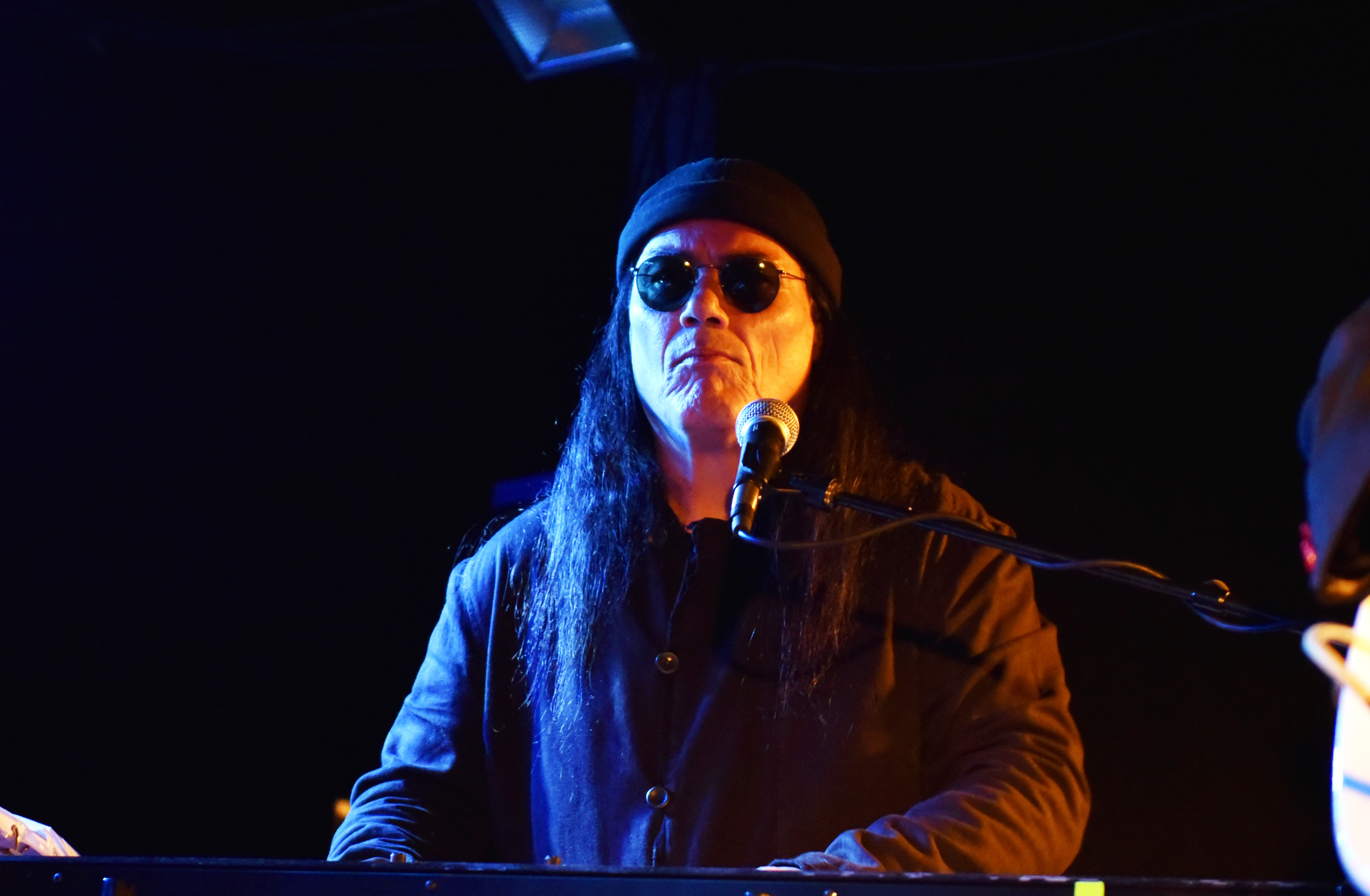
- Carey in 2016

Background information
- Born: October 16, 1953 (age 72); Watsonville, California, U.S.
- Origin: Turlock, California, U.S.
- Genres: Instrumental rock; space rock; progressive rock; hard rock; heavy metal
- Instruments: Keyboards; guitar; bass; vocals
- Years active: 1972–present
- Labels: ABC; Rocshire Records; MCA; X-Records; Geffen; Metronome; Teldec; East West; BMG Ariola; Happy Street Records; Babyboomer Music; Progrock Records; Renaissance; T-Toone Music
- Website: Official site

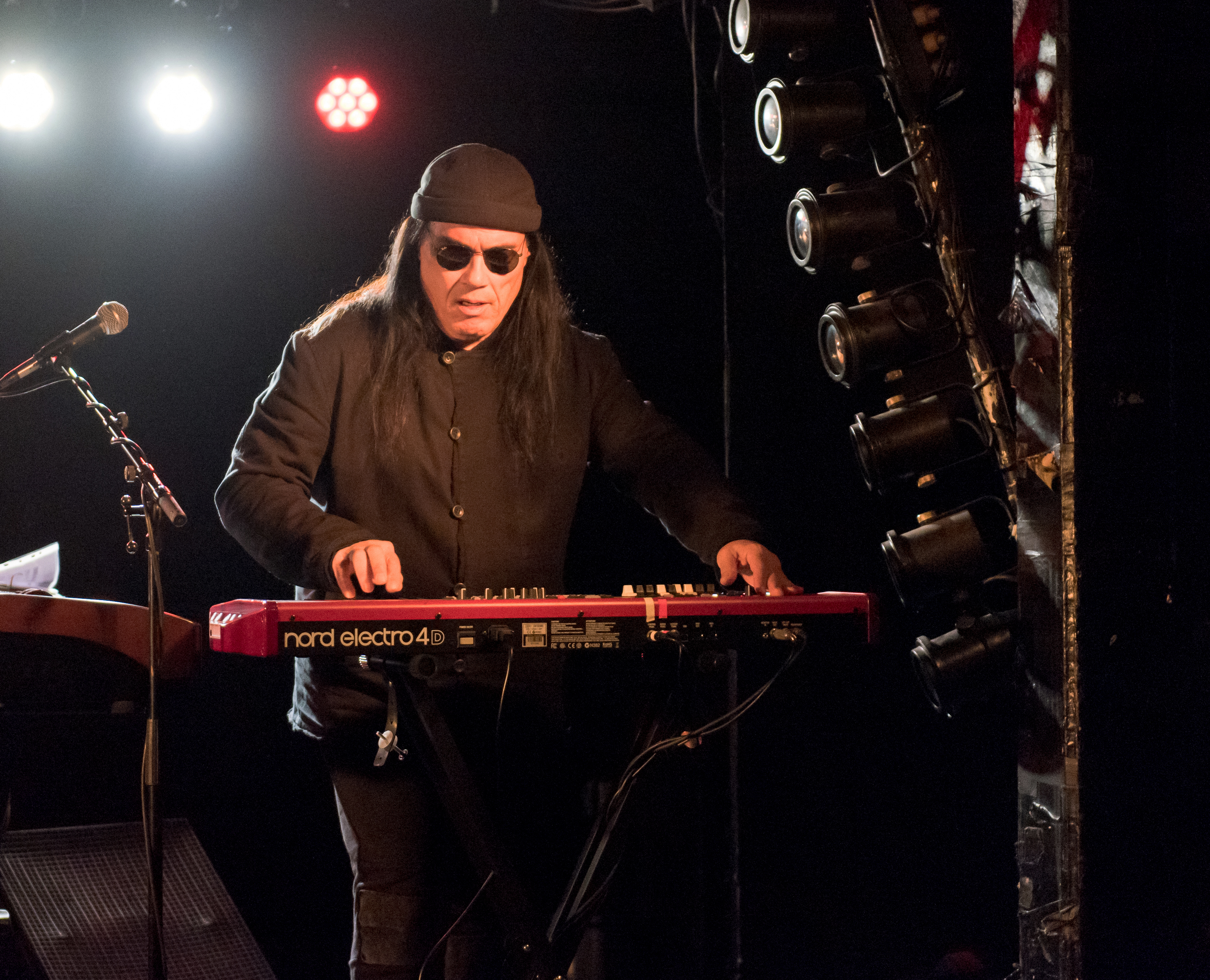
Tony Carey live in 2016 at Logo Hamburg

Anthony Lawrence Carey (born October 16, 1953, Watsonville, California, United States) is an American musician, composer, producer, and singer/songwriter. In his early career he was a keyboardist for Rainbow. After his departure in 1977, he began a solo career, releasing albums under his own name as well under the pseudonym Planet P Project, and producing for and performing with other artists.

== Early history ==
Carey had been playing his church's piano during off hours since he was very young, and was permitted to play the pipe organ as well. His family acquired a piano when he was seven, and at the age of eleven he got his first acoustic guitar and formed his first group, which played music by The Mamas and the Papas and others. His father gave him a Lowrey organ for his 14th birthday, and he started a rock band with other neighborhood children, playing music by The Doors. He also played contrabassoon in his school's orchestra.

At age 17, Carey moved to New Hampshire to start a new band called Blessings, which secured a recording contract with ABC Dunhill. After two years, the band was unable to complete its first album. According to Carey, this was due to his own involvement with girls, the producer's drug use, and difficulties with the record label.

== Career ==
=== Rainbow ===
While Blessings were in S. I. R. Rehearsal Studios in Hollywood working on material for their unfinished album, guitarist Ritchie Blackmore of Deep Purple was in another room, with bassist Jimmy Bain, auditioning musicians for his new band Rainbow. This led to Carey being auditioned, and an invitation to join Rainbow, which he accepted.

He recorded one studio album with Rainbow, the acclaimed 1976 release Rising. Carey's work on the album included the keyboard introduction to the opening track "Tarot Woman", and an extended keyboard solo on the final track "A Light in the Black". During Carey's two world tours with Rainbow, live material was recorded and subsequently released as two double LPs, On Stage (1977) and Live in Germany (1990). A six-disc CD box set containing music from the 1976 European leg of the tour, Deutschland Tournee 1976, was released in 2006.

Carey recorded keyboard parts for Rainbow's next studio album, Long Live Rock 'n' Roll (1978), many of which he says were included in the final album.

=== 1977–1983: Early solo years ===
Carey left Rainbow (rock band) in 1977 and moved to Germany in August 1978, where he began a solo career. During this period he spent many 20-hour days in a recording studio in Frankfurt with his friend and recording engineer Nigel Jopson, together with engineer Andy Lunn. The studio's owner, producer Peter Hauke, allowed Carey to use it for free and he subsequently recorded a great deal of instrumental music in many different styles, and learned how to engineer as well as perform in the studio. Carey's debut solo single Jamie was released in the US and Germany 1981 on the Mirage label, which was owned by Jerry L. Greenberg.But Carey was looking for a direction and at the time he was heavily influenced by bands like Kraftwerk. Yellow Power was released in 1982 as an instrumental album, together with his first recordings as a singer from 1980, In the Absence of the Cat, also released in 1982 on the indie label X-Records. A trio of instrumental albums, Explorer, No Human and Heaven, were also recorded during this period, but were never originally approved for release by Carey.

Tony Carey released I Won't Be Home Tonight on the Rocshire label in 1982, along with the single "West Coast Summer Nights". The album peaked at #167 on the Billboard 200, and the single peaked at #64 on the Billboard Hot 100 chart. The title track was also released as a single, peaking at #79 on the Hot 100 and #8 on Billboard's Top Rock Tracks chart. Following the death of Rocshire's promoter, Stacy Davis, the label's co-owners were imprisoned for embezzlement, resulting in its closure. The album rights and masters for I Won't Be Home Tonight were seized by federal authorities, and they remain the property of the US Internal Revenue Service. Carey found himself without a label.

=== 1983–1985: Planet P Project, Geffen, and MCA ===
Following the release of I Won't Be Home Tonight, Carey was signed to Geffen Records, and released his first album under the Planet P Project pseudonym, which he would use throughout his career for his more progressive and experimental music. Planet P Project, was released in March 1983 to modest reviews and reached #42 on the Billboard 200. During March, it peaked at #15 on Billboard's Rock Albums chart, with I Won't Be Home Tonight reaching #8.

Two singles were released from Planet P Project: "Why Me", which reached #64 on the Billboard Hot 100 singles chart and #4 in the magazine's Top Rock Tracks chart; and "Static", which reached #24 on Top Rock Tracks. The deal with Geffen stipulated that Carey was not to appear in any Planet P Project music videos or do any personal promotion, as it was in obvious conflict with the Tony Carey albums.

Carey followed this release with his second solo album, Some Tough City, John Kalodner at Geffen didn't like Carey's lyrics so due to a dispute, Carey moved to MCA Records.

In March 1984, MCA released Some Tough City, which peaked at #60 on the Billboard 200 album chart. The single "A Fine, Fine Day" reached #22 on the Billboard Hot 100 singles chart and #1 on the Top Rock Tracks chart. A follow-up single, "The First Day of Summer", reached #33 on the Hot 100 in July 1984 and appeared in the 1985 film Secret Admirer. Carey opened for Night Ranger on many dates of their 1984 tour in support of this album.

In late 1984, MCA released Planet P Project's Pink World as a double LP, reaching #121 on the Billboard 200. The album is a rock opera for which Carey wrote the lyrics and music, sang all vocals, and played most of the instruments. The single "What I See" reached #25 on Billboard's Top Rock Tracks. Both the LP and the single were released on pink vinyl. A music video for two songs on Pink World, "What I See" and "Behind the Barrier", remained in rotation for ten weeks on MTV.

Carey's 1985 final album for MCA, Blue Highway, took a year to record and did not score a hit on radio. Jimmy Barnes sang backing vocals on three songs and Jennifer Rush covered one of its songs, "Live Wire", on her album "Movin'. Carey filed a seven figure lawsuit against Peter Hauke, left Frankfurt and started recording in a studio in Tutzing with Peter Maffay.

=== 1986–1989: Music producer, composer, film soundtracks ===
Carey began producing and making guest appearances on releases by other artists. In 1986 he produced and co-wrote "Now That You're Gone" by Joe Cocker, the title song from the German movie Schimanski: The Crack Connection (German title: "Zabou"), starring Götz George.

Carey continued to record soundtracks. In 1987 he released Bedtime Story (soundtrack for the German film Lethal Obsession) on Teldec. Chris Thompson sang backing vocals, and Peter Maffay co-wrote three of the tracks. Carey also recorded the soundtrack for Wilder Westen Inclusive, a three-part television film directed by Dieter Wedel. This featured the single "Room With A View", which reached #3 on the German charts in 1989 and received a Gold record.

Carey produced and played keyboards for the 1988 album Chicago Line by John Mayall & the Bluesbreakers. He also played on albums with artists including Peter Maffay, Milva and Anne Haigis.

In November 1989, Carey released the album For You, on Metronome records which was produced by Carey and Nigel Jopson. This featured the single "I Feel Good", reached #35 on the German charts and was featured in the German television movie Tatort: Katjas Schweigen (Katjas Silence). A second single from For You, "No Man's Land", featured Eric Burdon and Anne Haigis.

=== 1990–1999 ===
In November 1990 Carey released the album Storyville, the last on Metronome records. It was produced by Carey and Sebastian Thorer and like the previous album was recorded at Carey's recording studio in Tutzing, Bavaria, Germany. "The Deal" and "Trampoline" were released as singles. Carey also produced, played several instruments and wrote four of the songs on Chris Norman's 1991 album Interchange.

With a new record deal with the international East West, Carey released The Long Road in April 1992, produced by Erwin Musper. "Wonderland" and "Jail" were the singles from the album.

In the autumn 1994 he released Cold War Kids on East West, his last solo album with a major record label. Carey produced the album with guitarist Ken Rose and Ben Wisch, and five of the songs were co-written with Rose. The title track was the only single from the album. Carey said in 2019: "East West Records was now Universal like everyone else. They sent me to New York City to Quad Studios in Times Square. They paid $450,000 for an album I did called Cold War Kids. I had an ironclad promise that they’d release it world-wide so I could capitalise on the success I’d had in the ’80’s. It ended up being released in Scandinavia, Switzerland and Germany and no English-speaking countries. When they wouldn’t release it or promote it, I walked into the record company with a cheque and told them that I was gone and at that point I left the music business in 1994." During 1994, Carey also spent a month in rehab.

In 1995 he sang and co-wrote the single "Birds in Cages", which was featured in the soundtrack to the German TV movie The Ice Princess, starring Katarina Witt. Carey also produced, wrote music and played on three albums with Swiss singer Natacha.

In 1999, BMG Germany released the album Gefangen im Jemen, a soundtrack to a TV movie, starring Peter Maffay and directed by Peter Patzak. The Boystown Tapes was also released the same year on Happy Street Records. It featured songs recorded between 1990 and 1998, some of which were outtakes originally intended for other albums.

=== 1999-2009: Mallorca years, Return of Planet P Project and cancer ===
Carey had at this time moved from Germany, and lived six years in Mallorca. He recorded his next album there, Island and Deserts, released in 2004.

Since the early 1990s, Carey had also been writing and recording new material with political and historical themes. Some of the tracks, and an unauthorized version of a new album called Go Out Dancing, leaked to the Internet.

Planet P Project returned on 24 December 2003 with Go Out Dancing Part 1 - 1931, first available as a free download. This was the first of a trilogy of albums titled Go Out Dancing (G.O.D.). The other two albums were G.O.D. Part 2 - Levittown (released March 2008), and G.O.D. Part 3 - Out In The Rain (released December 2009). Carey also released the compilation The New Machine, which featured some tracks recorded in the 1980s from an uncompleted Planet P album.

In 2006 Carey produced and played on Songs For the Siren by David Knopfler of Dire Straits. In a November 12, 2011 interview on LKCB 128.4 Internet Radio, he claimed, "I've written over a thousand songs, for myself, other artists, and film and TV productions."

In March 2009 Carey was diagnosed with a virulent form of bladder cancer. At one point he was told his odds of survival were ten percent. After twelve weeks in the hospital and five surgeries, he made a full recovery. He said: "I tried to get my 'bucket list' finished as quickly as I could; it wasn't a certainty that I'd be around much longer." Carey's former Rainbow bandmate Ronnie James Dio died of stomach cancer shortly after Carey's recovery. Carey said in a May 28, 2010 interview, "I'm very sad about his passing, especially because we got essentially the same disease, and I beat it, and he didn't."

=== 2009–2011: Over the Rainbow, EBC ROXX and cover albums ===
In 2009, Carey and three other ex-members of Rainbow, Joe Lynn Turner, Bobby Rondinelli and Greg Smith, teamed up with Jürgen Blackmore, Ritchie Blackmore's son, to form Over the Rainbow to perform Rainbow songs in Russia and Eastern Europe. Due to illness, however, Carey left the band in the spring of 2009, just before their live debut at the Sweden Rock Festival. He was replaced by Paul Morris.

Carey released Christmas Hymns in December 2009, an homage to the hymns he sang as a boy at midnight mass.

In 2010 it was announced that Carey had formed a new musical racing project called EBC ROXX with Jürgen Blackmore and Ela. Their first single, "Silver Arrows", was released in March 2010 and was written to accompany the first race of Mercedes Formula 1 drivers Michael Schumacher and Nico Rosberg that season. An album, Winners, followed later that year.

In 2010 and 2011, Carey released two albums featuring cover versions, Stanislaus County Kid Volume 1 and 2.

=== 2013: Second return of Planet P Project ===
After officially dismantling Planet P Project in 2009, Carey again revived the project with the release of Steeltown in 2013, under the name Tony Carey's Planet P Project. Contributors included guitarist Ronnie Le Tekro, Jimmy Durand on guitars and drums and Jostein 'Sarge' Svarstad on guitars. Russian guitarist Valery Lunichkin contributed a solo on "On The Side Of The Angels" and Karsten Kreppert played drums on "The Lady Fair".

Steeltown was based on Norway and its history, after Carey played and travelled there extensively, both as a solo artist and with a band consisting of mostly Norwegian musicians. Influenced by Norway's response to its occupation during World War II, the work is also a statement about religious conflicts worldwide.

In February 2014, a box set of the three Planet P Project Go Out Dancing CDs was released. The G.O.D.B.O.X. included an earlier bootleg of promotional recordings for the project.

=== 2015: Rainbow Project live shows ===
In 2015 he started to play live shows as Tony Carey's Rainbow Project: The Dio Years, with Norwegian musicians Åge Sten Nilsen (vocals), Per Ole Iversen (drums), Jostein Svarstad (guitar) and Jan Holberg (bass). The setlist featured Rainbow songs. In 2018, Carey and two other ex-members of Rainbow, Don Airey and Doogie White, performed with their projects at Moscow's Crocus City Hall.

=== 2019-present: Lucky Us, The Return of The Stanislaus County Kid and Mandoki Soulmates ===
In April 2019, Carey released Lucky Us, a deeply personal autobiographical album exploring his family life. He said, "I wrote six political history lessons; I think I've said all I have to say about that for awhile...Lucky Us is also about winning the lottery of life."

Carey also recorded a 19-minute rock opera entitled Operation: Paperclip, The Return of The Stanislaus County Kid, written by Bob Madsen and Kenny Steel. It was released in July 2019 on Highlander Company Records. The mini-album was based on characters created by Carey on his first solo albums. They also recorded a cover, “For What It's Worth” by Buffalo Springfield.

In February 2021, Carey released the new single, "We Hear You Calling", with a version of "Deportee" written by Woody Guthrie. He also became a member of the band Mandoki Soulmates featuring Leslie Mandoki.

In June 2024 Carey re-released a remixed and remastered version of the Planet P album Steeltown, and sang lead vocals and played piano on Mandoki Soulmates album A Memory Of Our Future, released in May 2024.

Carey lives in Wiesbaden, Germany, with his wife Marion, and Carey has three daughters.

== Discography ==
Solo

- 1982 In the Absence of the Cat (demos)
- 1982 I Won't Be Home Tonight / Self titled
- 1984 Some Tough City
- 1985 Blue Highway
- 1987 Bedtime Story (soundtrack)
- 1988 Wilder Westen Inclusive (soundtrack)
- 1989 For You
- 1990 Storyville
- 1992 The Long Road
- 1994 Cold War Kids
- 1999 The Boystown Tapes
- 2004 Islands and Deserts
- 2009 The New Machine (tracks originally recorded 1985–1994)
- 2009 Christmas Hymns
- 2010 Stanislaus County Kid
- 2011 Stanislaus County Kid, Volume II – Crossing the tracks
- 2019 Lucky Us

Planet P Project

- 1983 Planet P Project
- 1984 Pink World
- 2004 Go Out Dancing Part 1 "1931"
- 2008 Go Out Dancing Part 2 "Levittown"
- 2009 Go Out Dancing Part 3 "Out in The Rain"
- 2013 Steeltown
- 2014 The G.O.D.B.O.X. (4 disc set of G.O.D. part #1, 2 & 3 along with the remastered original bootleg of Go Out Dancing)

Operation: Paperclip

- 2019 The Return of Stanislaus County Kid (mini-album with Bob Madsen and Kenny Steel; lead vocals and keyboards by Carey)

Instrumental albums

- 1982 Yellow Power
- 1982 Explorer (demos)
- 1982 Heaven (demos)
- 1982 No Human (demos)
- 1984 T.C.P. (2011 as Early Adventures in Analog)
- 1999 Gefangen im Jemen (soundtrack) (3 tracks sung by Carey – "World Without You", "Going Away" and "The Sun Got in my Eyes" – and 17 instrumental tracks)
- 2006 The Voyager Files

Live albums

- 2006 Live in Sweden 2006 – Volume #1
- 2009 Live In Sweden 2006 – Volume #2
- 2011 Live in Europe

DVD

- 2008 A Candlelight Evening – Live in Sweden, 2006
- 2016 Showtime 2-DVD set: Live Sweden rock 2015, solo show and concert with Zöller network

Single-only releases

- 1981 "Jamie"
- 1988 "Midnight Wind" (b-side of Whitney Houston's "One Moment in Time" single)
- 1991 "Wenn die Liebe Geht – That's Not Love to Me" (with Ina Morgan)
- 1994 "Route 66 (Rose T.C.)"
- 1995 "Birds in Cages"
- 2004 "Überall Du" (German version of "Room with a View" featuring Mo Casal)
- 2021 "We Hear You Calling"

Compilations

- 1989 The Story So Far (1984-1987)
- 1993 For You (1988-1990)
- 1993 Rare Tracks (1979-1981) (not approved by Carey)
- 1997 A Fine, Fine Day (1984-1985)
- 1997 Storyville (1989-1990)
- 2000 Retrospective 1982–1999
- 2006 The Chillout Tapes (featuring DJ Shah) (limited edition release)
- 2006 Just Ballads
- 2008 Roundup – The Ones That Got Away
- 2008 A Lonely Life – The Anthology (1982-1999)
- 2008 Only The Young Die Good (songs from The Boystown Tapes and Island and Deserts)
- 2010 Rewind (limited free download – Slightly different versions of songs taken from Planet P Project – G.O.D. II & III and Stanislaus County Kid)
- 2011 Just Ballads, Volume II
- 2012 Just Rock (1984-2008)
- 2014 Songs about people (1988-2004)

== Other appearances ==
Selected other recordings:

- 1976 Rising – studio recording with Rainbow (keyboards)
- 1976 On Stage – live recording with Rainbow (keyboards)
- 1977 Putting it Straight – studio recording with Pat Travers (Minimoog on "Off Beat Ride')
- 1978 Live at the Hollywood Palladium – live recording with The Force (keyboards and vocals)
- 1981 Working – studio recording with Omega (guitar, lyrics)
- 1983 Wynn over America – studio recording with Michael Wynn (bass, guitar, keyboards, producer, songwriter)
- 1985 Sonne in der Nacht – studio recording with Peter Maffay (guitar, keyboards, producer, songwriter, backing vocals)
- 1985 Movin – studio recording by Jennifer Rush (songwriter, "Live Wire")
- 1985 The Circle – studio recording by Max Carl (backing vocals)
- 1986 Now That You're Gone – studio recording by Joe Cocker (producer, songwriter)
- 1986 Tabaluga und das leuchtende Schweigen – studio recording by Peter Maffay (guitar, keyboards, producer, songwriter, backing vocals)
- 1988 Lange Schatten – studio recording by Peter Maffay (guitar, keyboards, producer, songwriter, backing vocals)
- 1988 Chicago Line – studio recording by Johnny Mayall's Blues Breakers (keyboards, piano, producer)
- 1988 Unterwegs Nach Morgen – studio recording by Milva (producer, songwriter)
- 1990 Live in Germany, 76' – Live with the band Rainbow (keyboards)
- 1991 Interchange – studio recording by Chris Norman (songwriter, producer, bass, acoustic guitar, keyboards and backing vocals)
- 1991 Alles Easy – studio recording by Ina Morgan (producer, vocals, all instruments)
- 1993 Orlando – studio recording by Natacha (producer, bass, acoustic guitar, keyboards)
- 1993 Respect – studio recording by Sinner (producer, keyboards, vocals on "Billy's Song" and "All For One")
- 1995 Stärntaler – studio recording by Natacha (producer, bass, acoustic guitar, keyboards, songwriter)
- 1996 Venezia – studio recording by Natacha (producer, bass, acoustic guitar, keyboards, songwriter)
- 2002 Tabaluga Viatja Buscant El Seny – José Carreras and Cris Juanico (producer)
- 2003 Second Step – Summer tour Live 2003 – live recording by Melvin Taylor & The Slack Band (Hammond, keyboard, vocals)
- 2006 Songs for the Siren – studio recording by David Knopfler (Hammond, piano, producer)
- 2006 Deutschland Tournee, 1976 (30th anniversary ed. box set) – live with the band Rainbow (keyboards)
- 2009 Fade to black – studio recording by Evil Masquerade (keyboards on "Lights Out")
- 2010 The Pirates from Hell – studio recording by Zed Yago (keyboards)
- 2010 The Winners – studio recording project called EBC Roxx (with J.R. Jürgen Blackmore & Ela)
- 2013 The Jan Holberg Project : At Your Service (lead vocals on the tracks "Outta My Face" and "21 Red")
- 2015 My Route 66 - studio recording by The Boyscout (lead vocals on "Take It Easy")
- 2017 The Well – studio recording by Trine Rein (vocals, instruments and producing)
- 2021 Utopia For Realists (Hungarian Pictures) - studio and live recording by Mandoki Soulmates (vocals and keyboards)
- 2024 A Memory of our Future – studio recording by Mandoki Soulmates (vocals and keyboards)
- 2025 Eyes Grow Wide – studio recording by Gordian, feat Graham Bonnet (keyboards)
