= Planet P Project (album) =

Planet P

Studio album by Planet P Project
- Released: 1.5.1983
- Studio: Hotline Studios, Frankfurt, West Germany
- Genre: Progressive rock, new wave
- Label: Geffen
- Producer: Peter Hauke

Planet P Project chronology
Planet P (1983)	Pink World (1984)

Professional ratings
Review scores
Source	Rating
Allmusic	3/5 stars
Artistdirect	3/5 stars

Planet P Project, first released as Planet P, is an album released in 1983 by the group Planet P Project (originally known as Planet P) led by Tony Carey. The cassette and CD editions have two bonus tracks not found on the LP.

== Track listing ==
=== Side one ===
1. "Static" – 4:04
2. "King for a Day" – 3:57
3. "I Won't Wake Up" – 3:46
4. "Top of the World" – 4:34
5. "Armageddon" – 4:20
6. "Tranquility Base" (bonus track on cassette and CD) – 1:55

=== Side two ===
1. "Why Me?" – 4:06
2. "Power Tools" – 3:59
3. "Send It in a Letter" – 3:52
4. "Adam and Eve" – 3:36
5. "Only You and Me" – 3:22
6. "Ruby" (bonus track on cassette and CD) – 3:59

== Personnel ==
- Tony Carey – lead vocals, backing vocals, keyboards, bass, acoustic guitars, Roland rhythm composer programs
- David Thomas – lead vocals on "Only You and Me"
- Johan Daansen – guitars
- Robert Musenpichler – guitars
- Helmut Bibl – guitars
- Hartmut Pfannmueller – drums and percussion
- Fritz Matzka – drums and percussion
- Peter Hauke – drums and percussion
- Reinhard Besser - bass

== Production ==
- Recorded and mixed at Hotline Studios, Frankfurt, West Germany
- Producer: Peter Hauke
- Engineer: Andy Lunn, Nigel Jopson and Jon Gaffrey
- Assistant Engineers: Carmine Di, Mathias Dietrich
- Mixing Engineer: Andy Lunn
- Originally mastered by Greg Fulginiti at Artisan Sound Recorders
- All words and music by Tony Carey
- Art direction: Richard Seireeni
- Cover graphics: George Snow

== Chart positions ==
=== Album ===
Chart	Peak position
US Billboard 200	42

=== Singles ===
Year	Song	Peak positions	
Year	Song	Mainstream Rock	Hot 100
1983	"Static"	24	–
1983	"Why Me?"	4	64
