= Planet P Project =

US musical group

Planet P Project is a pseudonym used by American rock musician Tony Carey for his science-fiction themed, progressive rock/space rock music. Carey has released six albums under the Planet P Project name: Planet P (1983, later retitled Planet P Project), Pink World (1984), Go Out Dancing, Part I (1931) (2004), Go Out Dancing, Part II (Levittown) (2008), Go Out Dancing, Part III (Out in the Rain) (2009) and Steeltown (2013). Music videos for singles from the first albums received moderate to heavy airplay on MTV when originally released. Pink World was originally a two-record set, released on bright-pink-colored vinyl.

Planet P's most well known singles were "Why Me?" and "Static". Go Out Dancing, Part I (1931) is the first of the trilogy, with part two titled Go Out Dancing, Part II (Levittown) and part three as Go Out Dancing, Part III (Out in the Rain).

The project's name was inspired from the fictional "Planet P" in Robert A. Heinlein's book Starship Troopers.

== History ==
"Planet P Project" is a pseudonym used by rock musician Tony Carey to distinguish his more progressive and experimental music from his pop-oriented rock releases.

=== Tony Carey before Planet P Project ===
Tony Carey signed his first recording contract in the early 1970s with his band Blessings, though the band never finished recording an album. Carey successfully auditioned as the keyboardist for Ritchie Blackmore's band Rainbow and played with the band for two years. He recorded one studio album with Rainbow, the highly acclaimed Rising, and live concert material from two world tours was subsequently released as two double LPs and a six-disc CD box set.

Carey left Rainbow in 1977 and moved to Germany in 1978. He met producer Peter Hauke, who owned Hotline recording studio in Frankfurt, and Carey spent many hours over the next five years with his friend and recording engineer Nigel Jopson, recording as he wanted, often working twenty-hour days. As Carey states, he suffered the consequences of excessive drug use during this period. He recorded all of his early albums at that studio. He released his first solo album, In the Absence of the Cat, in 1982, on the indie label X-Records. Carey released his second solo album, I Won't Be Home Tonight, on the Rocshire label in 1982, along with the single (and music video) "West Coast Summer Nights". The title track was also released as a single.

=== 1983: Planet P Project ===
Carey was signed to Geffen Records for his third solo album (later to be released as Some Tough City), but he had a great deal of music written that didn't fit the style of that album. He was able to sign a second record deal with Geffen to record and release that material under the Planet P Project pseudonym. He released his first album under the name Planet P Project in 1983, called Planet P Project (originally titled Planet P). Planet P Project received modest reviews (e.g., ref and). The album, however, contained the more highly acclaimed song "Why Me", which was released as Planet P Project's first popular single, reaching #64 on the Billboard Hot 100 singles chart and #4 in the magazine's Top Rock Tracks chart. According to Carey, the video for "Why Me" made a "slight impact on early MTV." Tom Demalon, writing for MTV, was less modest:

With heavy exposure of the accompanying video on MTV, the single "Why Me?" clicked at album rock outlets, climbing into the Top Ten while it also managed to crossover over onto the pop charts.

"Why Me" was described in Billboard by Cincinnati's WEBN-FM program director, Denton Marr, as "unusual, eclectic, and very entertaining." The song was one of 30 songs to be included in the 1995 MTV compilation album MTV Class of 1983.

=== 1984: Pink World ===
In 1983 and 1984, Carey recorded his third solo album, Some Tough City, and his second Planet P Project album, Pink World. A dispute with the label arose when, according to Carey, Geffen's representative was not satisfied with the lyrics to "A Fine, Fine Day" and "The First Day of Summer", both of which would later be released as singles from the album Some Tough City, and Carey refused to rewrite them. The Pink World album was recorded with minimal input from Geffen, and the finished product was not well received by the label. Carey had this to say about the response from Geffen:

I delivered Pink World [to Geffen], and the shit REALLY hit the fan. Some of the comments that filtered back to me were "unreleasable" and "this kid's crazy." And some bad ones, too. Long story short, I got traded like a baseball player to MCA Records, which went ahead and released both of these records.

In late 1984 MCA released Planet P Project's double LP rock opera, Pink World, which peaked at #121 on The Billboard 200. The single "What I See" reached #25 on Billboard's Top Rock Tracks. Both the double LP and the single were released on pink vinyl. A single music video, titled Pink World (though the song "Pink World" was not included in the video), which featured two songs from the Pink World album, "What I See" and "Behind the Barrier", was released on MTV and remained in power rotation or active rotation for ten weeks on the network.

=== 20-year hiatus and return of Planet P Project ===
Given the relative success of Some Tough City, Carey focused his attention on recordings to be released under his own name.

In 1991 Carey recorded the track "The Red Door" to re-introduce Artemis (the boy from the Pink World album); then Carey changed his mind and forgot about a possible sequel. Later in August 2008 Carey released the compilation "The New Machine", which featured some songs recorded between 1985 and 1994 intended to be part of a third Planet P Project album. The Yugoslav Wars had inspired Carey to write the songs "Tears" and "The Sins of the Fathers" with guitarist Ken Rose. Carey was also inspired by the book The Fifties by David Halberstam and wrote some songs about the Baby boomers and Levittown. After a 20-year hiatus, Carey resurrected the Planet P Project name for a trilogy of albums collectively called Go Out Dancing (G.O.D.). The albums were 1931 (2004), Levittown (2008), and Out In The Rain (2009).

After officially dismantling "Planet P Project" in 2009 with the 3rd & final part to the "G. O. D." trilogy, "Out In The Rain", Carey again revived the project with the release of "Steeltown" in 2013, this time merging his solo career name with the project's name ("Tony Carey's Planet P Project").

Carey based "Steeltown" on Norway & its history after having played and traveled there extensively, both as a solo artist and with a band consisting of mostly Norwegian musicians. Influenced by the occupation years of World War II and the way Norway handled this as a nation, the work is also a statement about the eternal religious conflicts worldwide.

In 2014 a box set of the three Go Out Dancing CD's was released, 'the G.O.D.B.O.X.', which included an earlier bootleg of promotional recordings for the project.

== Discography ==
- 1983 Planet P Project (reissued 2009; limited edition vinyl 2020)
- 1984 Pink World (reissued 2008; limited edition vinyl 2020)
- 2004 Go Out Dancing Part 1 "1931"
- 2008 Go Out Dancing Part 2 "Levittown"
- 2009 Go Out Dancing Part 3 "Out in The Rain"
- 2013 Steeltown (as Tony Carey's Planet P Project)
- 2014 The G.O.D.B.O.X. (4 disc set of G.O.D. part #1, 2 & 3 along with the remastered original bootleg of Go Out Dancing)

== Music videos ==
Music videos were made for "Why Me?" and "Static", as well as Pink World. (The Pink World video combined two songs from the Pink World album, "What I See" and "Behind the Barrier", and the video itself bore the title Pink World.) Carey does not physically appear in any of these videos. No official music videos were released by Planet P Project for music on any of the albums after Pink World.
