= Finley railway station =

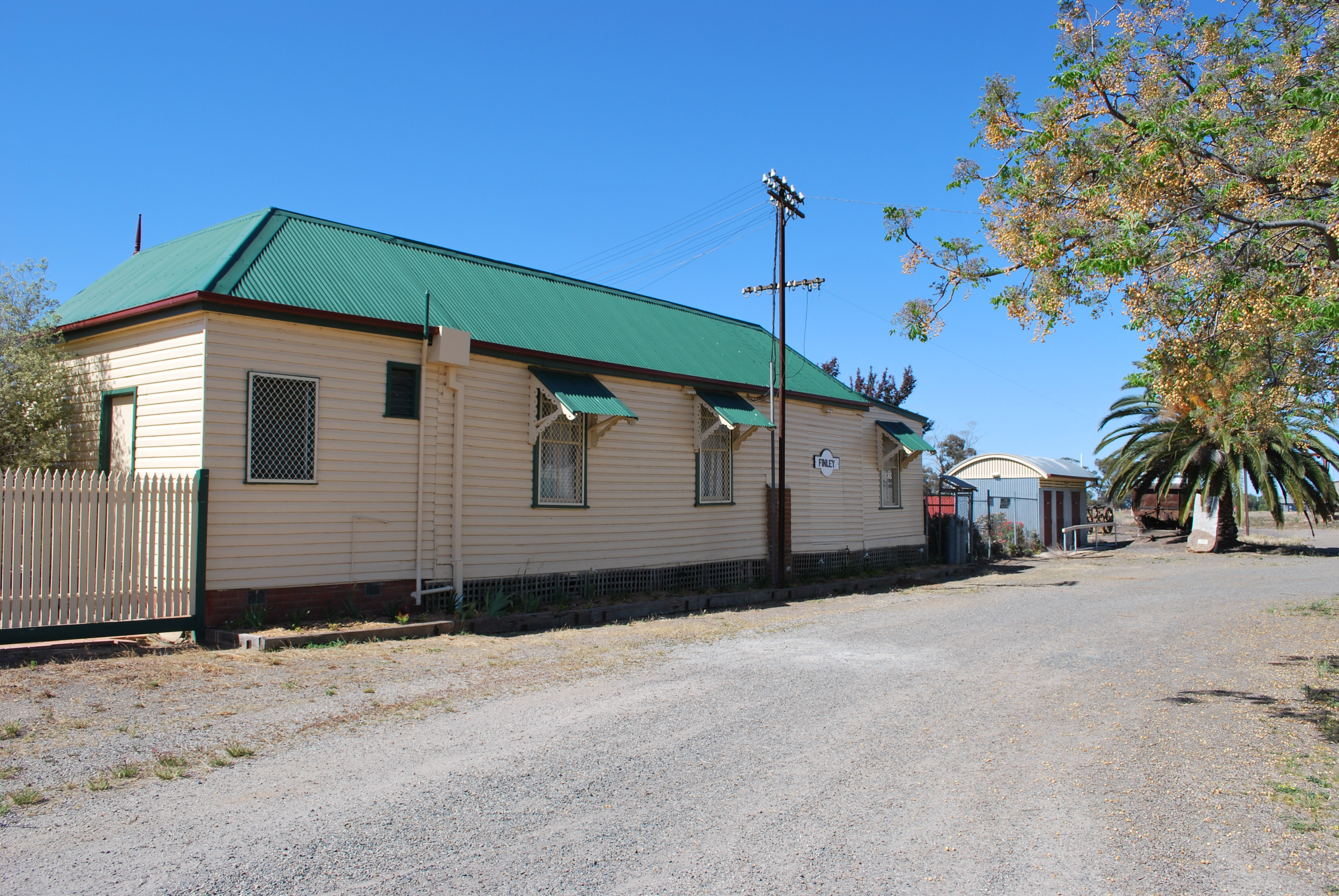

- Location within New South Wales Location within Australia
- 35.6434°S 145.5782°E
- Location: Narrandera-Tocumwal railway, Finley, Berrigan Shire, New South Wales, Australia

Site notes
- Owner: Transport Asset Manager of New South Wales

New South Wales Heritage Register
- Official name: Finley Railway Precinct
- Type: state heritage (complex / group)
- Designated: 2 April 1999
- Reference no.: 1144
- Type: Railway Platform / Station
- Category: Transport – Rail

Finley railway station is a heritage-listed former railway station on the Narrandera-Tocumwal railway line in the town of Finley, New South Wales in Australia. The property was added to the New South Wales State Heritage Register on 2 April 1999.

== History ==
The former station now hosts the Finley Pioneer Railway Museum with various artefacts. It is operated by the Finley Pioneer Rail Committee, who conduct guided tours of the site.

== Description ==
The type-16 timber pioneer station building dates from 1898.

The 36 by 18 feet (11.0 by 5.5 m) sub-type-4 corrugated iron skillion roof also dates from 1898.

A timber stacking and storage shed and an 1898 T282 5-tonne gantry crane also fall within the heritage listing.

The concrete platform has had two levels. It was originally at ground level but was later raised to carriage-entrance height.

== Heritage listing ==
Finley is a rare pioneer station group with the building and platform located at ground level (Yass Town railway station being the only such other building). The building is an adaptation of the standard terminus pioneer station building and has the added interest of having a raised platform added at a later date adjacent to the building. The yard contains much of the original layout and buildings with intact goods shed, gantry crane, lamp room as well a small second station building. The site represents the then outer limits of railway expansion, the intense competition between states for trade and the change in attitude to railway construction in the outer areas of the State. It was a terminus from 1898 until the line was extended to Tocumwal in 1914.

Finley Railway Precinct was listed on the New South Wales State Heritage Register on 2 April 1999 having satisfied the following criteria.

This item is assessed as historically rare. This item is assessed as arch. rare. This item is assessed as socially rare.
