= Pink World =

Studio album by Planet P Project
- Released: 1984
- Recorded: Hotline Studios, Frankfurt, West Germany
- Genre: Progressive rock, art rock
- Length: 78:09
- Label: MCA
- Producer: Peter Hauke (Note: See The "producer" section below for a discussion on Hauke's actual role as producer. He is not credited as such on all releases of this album.)

Planet P Project chronology
Planet P Project (1983)	Pink World (1984)	Go Out Dancing Part 1 "1931" (2004)

Pink World is a rock opera and the second album released by American rock music recording artist Planet P Project as a double LP, originally released by MCA Records on pink vinyl, and cassette in 1984, and on CD in 1993. It was remastered and re-released on CD as Pink World [Definitive Edition] by Renaissance Records in 2008. Pink World is also the title of the album's promotional music video. The video features two songs from the album. (The title track is not included in the video.)

Planet P Project is a pseudonym used by American rock musician and producer Tony Carey (born Anthony Lawrence Carey on October 16, 1953) for his more experimental recordings. Pink World is Carey's fifth solo studio album under his name or as Planet P Project. Carey performed all vocals and nearly all instruments on the album, and composed all of the songs.

The album tells the story of a dystopian society sheltered from nuclear annihilation by the Zone, a protected area created through the psychic powers of a seven-year-old boy named Artemus. The boy is manipulated by government officials into acting as a figurehead to gain public support for their rule, though Artemus himself has nearly absolute power over everybody in the Zone. Artemus eventually leaves the area of safety he created, causing it to vanish as he departs. Pink World was a success among the critics, though sales were initially modest. However, the album has achieved a cult following.

== Background ==
Planet P Project is a pseudonym used by rock musician Tony Carey to distinguish his more progressive and experimental music from his pop-oriented rock releases.

In 1982, Carey released his first two solo albums, In the Absence of the Cat, on the indie label X-Records, and I Won't Be Home Tonight, on the Rocshire label, along with the single (and music video) "West Coast Summer Nights". The title track of the second album was also released as a single.

Upon the demise of the Rocshire label, Carey signed with Geffen Records for his third solo album, but he had a great deal of music written that didn't fit the style of that album. He signed a second contract with Geffen to record and release that material under the "Planet P Project" pseudonym. He released his first album under the name Planet P Project in 1983, called Planet P (later titled Planet P Project) and the first popular single under the Planet P Project name, "Why Me", which reached #64 on the Billboard Hot 100 singles chart and #4 in the magazine's Top Rock Tracks chart. The single and its video made an impact on MTV during its formative years. (The song was one of 30 songs to be included on the 1995 MTV compilation album MTV Class of 1983.) Planet P Project had become a successful recording act independent of Tony Carey's self-named releases.

In 1983 and 1984, Carey recorded his third solo album, Some Tough City, and his second Planet P Project album, the double LP rock opera Pink World, in Hotline Studios, which he co-owned with producer Peter Hauke. A dispute with the label arose when, according to Carey, Geffen's representative was not satisfied with the lyrics to "A Fine, Fine Day" and "The First Day of Summer", both of which would later be released as singles from the album Some Tough City, and Carey refused to rewrite them. Relations with Geffen deteriorated further when Carey delivered the finished Pink World album, which was not well received by the label. Carey had this to say about the response from Geffen:

I delivered Pink World, and the shit REALLY hit the fan. Some of the comments that filtered back to me were "unreleasable" and "this kid's crazy." And some bad ones, too. Long story short, I got traded like a baseball player to MCA Records, which went ahead and released both of these records.

MCA released Some Tough City in the spring of 1984, along with two top 40 singles from the album, and Carey and the label decided to delay the release of Pink World until later that year to avoid interfering with sales and airplay of the earlier album by releasing competing material.

=== Promotional video ===
A single promotional music video combining the two Pink World songs "What I See" and "Behind the Barrier" was produced by MGMM Productions. The video, simply titled Pink World, was directed by Roger Lyons, who had previously directed six other music videos, including "Every Man Has a Woman Who Loves Him" by Yoko Ono and John Lennon, and worked with Ridley Scott as assistant director in Apple Computer's famous 1984 television advertisement. Along with art director Steve Addison, Lyons created a video that Frank Lovece from Faces described as looking "far less like rock clips (Note: "Rock clips" was a common synonym for rock music videos when the quoted article was written, in early 1985. Lovece was speaking in the plural, considering the single production to be two individual clips edited together.) and more like surrealist paintings come to life," and they did so on a budget of under £40,000 UK (1984, not corrected for inflation). They achieved this in part by filming the entire video on 16 mm film instead of the standard 35 mm film.

In describing his vision for the video, Lyons said, "My inspiration was pictorial…what I saw mostly was sort of everybody's nightmare, with a lot of my own background." Lovece points out that this extended to Lyons' decision to cast his own mother and father in the two parental roles.

At the time of the video's production, Carey was negotiating for financing to have Pink World made into a feature film, but the film never materialized.

== Plot ==
=== Album ===
The album tells a dystopian story of a group of people who were sheltered from nuclear attack in an area called the Zone, which itself was created through the psychic powers of a speechless seven-year-old boy named Artemus (spelled both "Artemus" and "Artemis" in the lyrics in the CD booklet), or Artie. These supernatural powers came to the boy following exposure to polluted water in a lifeless river, which flows past a factory that makes household goods. In addition to gaining numerous psychic powers, including psychokinesis and clairvoyance, the boy is condemned to live forever, and he prevents any of the inhabitants of the Zone from aging physically.

Artemus is held by officials of an unnamed government (Implied to be the United States from the description of the "White House lawn" in "A letter from the Shelter") who fear his powers yet want to use them militarily. As part of this plan, they persuade him to construct the Zone, and they present him to the people as an inspiring nationalistic symbol. Once the Zone is completed, the government launches a first strike nuclear attack against an unnamed foe, possibly the Soviet Union. From that point on, life for the survivors in the Zone becomes distinctly Orwellian, revolving around the will of the omnipresent Artemus, who is accepted by the people as a benevolent messianic figure. The boy can read the thoughts of anyone in the Zone, and the people find that comforting. He has absolute power, though he is influenced by flattery to enforce the will of the government officials. Throughout much of the story, Artemus is confused and unsure of what he should do, which adds to his vulnerability to official leadership.

The story concludes with Artemus vanishing from the Zone, leaving behind only a "little pink pool" and a basket at the orphanage, a "baby at the door." The barriers enclosing the Zone begin to fade, and the fearful inhabitants realize they no longer need him.

Many items in the plot, including Artemus' departure from the Zone, are treated with ambiguity and metaphor. Tony Carey has declined to offer specifics:

I'm not going to tell you what it's about - that's for YOU to figure out. (I've gotten a kick out of all the well-meaning interpretations I've read.)

=== Music video ===
The Pink World music video does not adhere strictly to the plot of the album.

The video begins with Pink World's main character, Artemus, shown in his bedroom, looking out the window at a helicopter that follows him throughout the first half of the video. He is then shown holding a small globe that is glowing red. His mother enters and puts the globe under his bed and tucks him in. With the helicopter following him, the scene changes to a large institutional setting filled with empty beds. He appears sad and confused as his mother washes him. He sees a vision of crowds of people in the Barrier (foreshadowing the scene in the second part of the video). The first part of the video ends as we see Artemus again looking out of his bedroom window, the institution and the crowds in the Barrier apparently a vision. He climbs back into bed. The plot in the first part of the video is not linear. Scenes are interspersed with flashbacks and future visions.

As the music transitions from "What I see" to "Behind the Barrier", Artemus is shown emerging from the cage section of "The Healer" ("Le Thérapeute", a figure appearing in many works by Belgian surrealist artist René Magritte, e.g., ref) He then finds himself in a surreal scene populated with what Lovece describes as "ragged waifs" crowded into the tall Barrier that encloses the Zone, with skeleton soldiers patrolling the ground. Artemus witnesses three identical girls emerging from a shell, one at a time, apparently having been cloned. He then sees himself emerging as a clone from a similar shell, and he grins at himself. (No such episode is described in the album's lyrics. This is one of several instances of artistic license employed by the video's director, Roger Lyons.) The video ends with Artemus shown content among the masses of "ragged waifs" gathered within the Barrier.

== Release ==
MCA's original double LP version of Pink World was released in late November, 1984. The album was simultaneously released in the US and Europe. (Note: MCA issued a separate release with a separate catalog number for West Germany than it did for the UK and the rest of Europe, where the album was released on the BMG label.) The double LP was pressed on what one reviewer called “Pepto Bismol pink vinyl.” The single for "What I See" was also released on pink vinyl, as was the 12" promotional single distributed to radio stations for airplay. MCA also released the album on cassette. (Note: This was the last album Tony Carey released under the name Planet P Project until 2005, when he released Go Out Dancing Part 1 "1931".)

The Pink World video was released at the same time, and it immediately went into power rotation on MTV.

=== Reception ===
Pink World entered the Billboard 200 album chart on December 1, 1984, peaking at #121 on February 2, 1985. It was selected as a pick by Billboard in their December 15, 1984 issue. The accompanying review referred to the album as a "thematic extravaganza" with "plenty of dramatic rock arrangements." Pink World spent a total of 14 weeks in the Billboard 200, with its last appearance in the March 2, 1985 chart. The song "What I See" reached #25 on Billboard's Top Rock Tracks chart on December 29 of 1984, though the single, "What I See" (b/w "Behind the Barrier"), did not reach the Billboard Hot 100 chart, despite Billboard endorsing it as a recommended pop single in their February 2, 1985 issue. (Note: All content under this subheading is sourced from Billboard, all issues from December 1, 1984 (volume 96, issue 48), through March 2, 1985 (volume 97, issue 9). All information comes from the print issues of Billboard, as scanned and maintained on the Billboard website at http://www.billboard.com/magazine-archive.)

The Pink World video entered power rotation on MTV during the week ending December 1, 1984. The video remained in power rotation or active rotation for ten weeks on the network. The Campus Network (Note: A now defunct cable TV network.) also aired the Pink World video during their New Groove show.

=== Continued popularity ===
Although sales of the album were modest when it was released, Pink World continues to enjoy popularity with fans of the progressive rock genre. Tom Demalon of AllMusic rates the album at 4 1/2 stars out of five. Demalon writes, "Pink World is a curiously interesting work that has managed to achieve a certain cult status."

Sam Fiorani from The High Fidelity Report, in a 2013 review of the albums Planet P Project and Pink World, described both albums as "the best-kept secrets hidden away in the stacks of vinyl across the country." Summarizing opinions found around the Internet, Fiorani says "'It would make a good SciFi movie' and 'make no mistake, Pink World is a phenomenal album' are types of comments on the ‘Net by fans of this set." He concludes his review with the recommendation, "Give yourself a treat and find your own copies of Planet P and Pink World for a glimpse of a time long gone by and great music that may never return."

== The "producer" ==
Peter Hauke produced albums with Nektar in the seventies and White Lion's debut album. He was also credited as the producer in the MCA editions of Pink World, as well as Carey's first three studio albums and the previous Planet P Project. However, in the liner notes for the 2008 remastered edition CD, Carey does not name Hauke, but harshly criticizes him as someone who made no artistic contribution to the recording (confirmed by technicians working on this project). He writes,

"The 'producer' was quite talented - at making deals and money - all of which he kept for himself."

Hauke is not credited as the producer in the liner notes, CD booklet, or on the disc itself in the 2008 release. He is not referred to by name in the liner notes. He is only referred to as the "producer", always in quotation marks. He is named on the back cover of the CD booklet as a co-arranger.

== Track listing ==
All compositions by Tony Carey

1. "In the Woods" – 1:00
2. "To Live Forever" – 4:00
3. "Pink World" – 4:29
4. "What I See" – 4:40
5. "To Live Forever, Pt. 2" – 0:36
6. "Power" – 4:21
7. "In the Forest" – 1:14
8. "A Boy Who Can't Talk" – 4:32
9. "The Stranger" – 4:42
10. "What I See, Pt. 2" – 1:12
11. "The Shepherd" – 4:50
12. "Behind the Barrier" – 4:15
13. "Pink World Coming Down" – 1:27
14. "Breath" – 0:56
15. "This Perfect Place" – 4:24
16. "What Artie Knows" – 4:31
17. "In the Zone" – 4:27
18. "Behind the Barrier, Pt. 2" – 0:54
19. "March of the Artemites" – 4:33
20. "This Perfect Place, Pt. 2" – 0:45
21. "A Letter from the Shelter" – 5:26
22. "What Artie Knows, Pt. 2" – 0:52
23. "One Star Falling" – 4:19
24. "Baby's at the Door" – 3:41
25. "Requiem" – 1:54
26. "A Boy Who Can't Talk, Pt. 2" – 1:14

== Personnel ==
- Tony Carey – all instruments and vocals (except as noted below), computer programs, arrangement, 2008 remastering

=== Additional musicians ===
- Reinhard Besser – guitar (solo) on tracks 4, 17, and 19
- Helmut Bibl – guitar (solo) on tracks 6 and 12
- Roderich Gold – Fairlight synthesizer
- Fritz Matzka – drums on tracks 2, 17, and 23
- Robert Musenbichler – guitar (lead) on track 23
- Eddie Taylor – saxophone on track 23

=== Additional artistic and technical personnel ===
- Tim Baldwin – tape operator
- Shane Dempsey – Fairlight synthesizer programming
- Michael Diehl – design
- Mathias Dietrich – assistant engineer
- Larry DuPont – photography
- John W. Edwards – CD booklet layout
- Greg Fulginiti – original mastering
- Peter Hauke – co-arrangement
- Nigel Jopson – recording engineer
- Andy Lunn – mixing engineer
- Mariusz Zych (Marius the Polish Kid) – tape operator
- George Snow – SX-70 image
- Stan Watts – illustration
