= Finley, New South Wales =

Finley
- Town
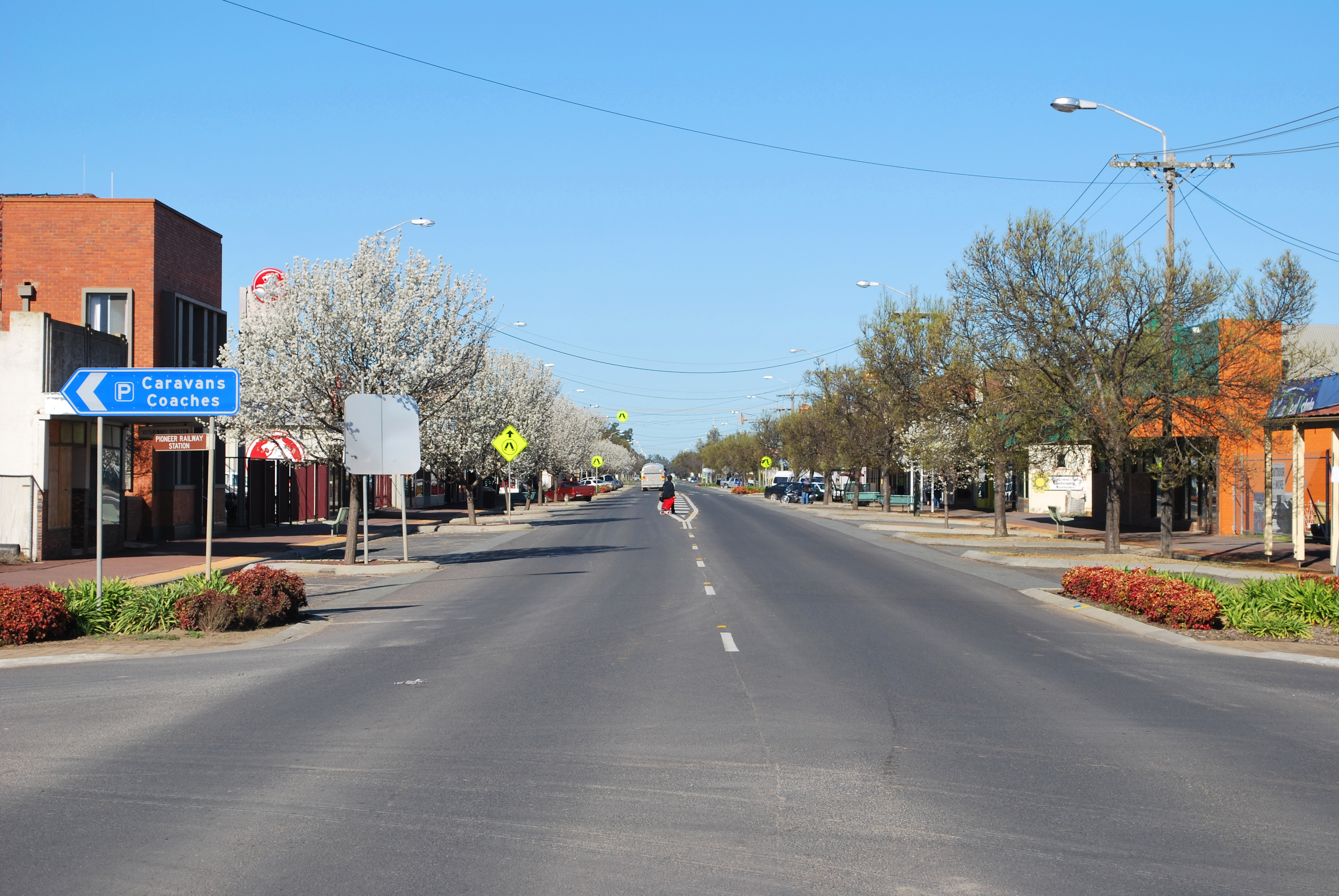
- Murray Street (Newell Highway), the main street of Finley

- Coordinates: 35°38′0″S 145°34′0″E
- Country: Australia
- State: New South Wales
- LGA: Berrigan Shire
- Location: 664 km (413 mi) SW of Sydney; 278 km (173 mi) N of Melbourne; 145 km (90 mi) W of Albury; 101 km (63 mi) N of Shepparton (Vic); 60 km (37 mi) E of Deniliquin

Government
  - State electorate: Murray
  - Federal division: Farrer
- Elevation: 107 m (351 ft)

Population
  - Total: 2,455 (2021 census)
- Postcode: 2713
- County: Denison

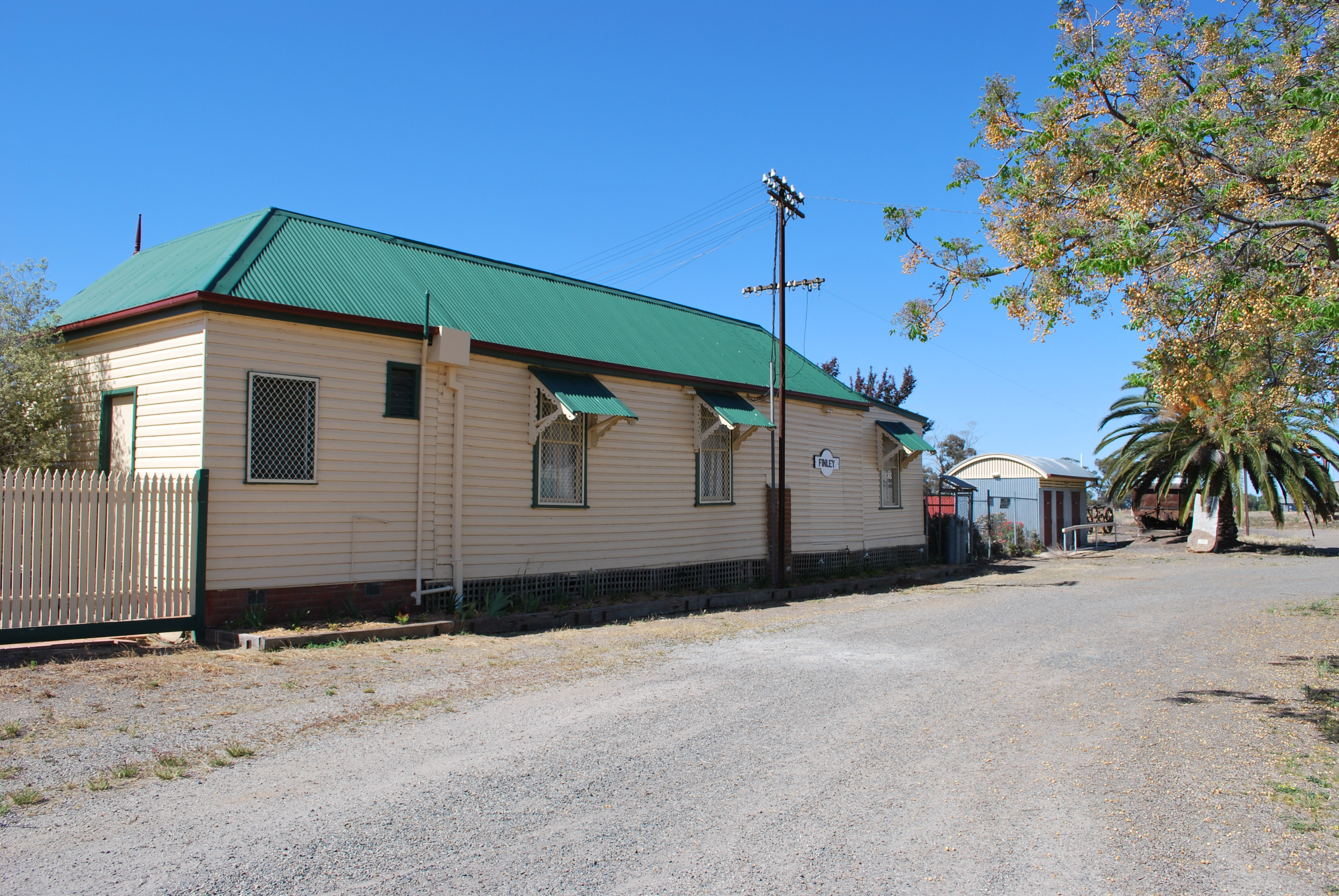
Finley station, built in an American "pioneer" style as a cost-saving measure during the depression at the turn of the 19th century.

Finley /ˈfɪnli/ is a town in the Riverina region of New South Wales, Australia. Finley is the largest town in the Berrigan Shire local government area. At the 2021 census, Finley had a population of 2,455.

The town is located approximately 140 kilometres (87 mi) west of Albury on the intersection of the Newell Highway and Riverina Highways. When a settlement was established, it was named Finley after the person who surveyed 1.2 million hectares of the Riverina district in the 1870s. Prior to that, one of the words for the area was "Carawatha", a word for "place of pines" in Wiradjuri language.

== Settlement ==
Europeans first settled the area around Finley in the early 1840s, with wheat becoming the main crop.

The first permanent residence in the town was built in 1878. The post office opened on 1 January 1881 but was known as Murray Hut until 1893.

Periods of severe drought, combined with the Great Depression of the early 1930s, forced many farmers to abandon their holdings.

In 1935, construction on the Mulwala Canal began in order to provide employment and bring water to the area's rich farmland, with irrigation reaching the area in 1939, celebrated with a 'Back-To-Finley' event. This enabled the region to prosper with beef and dairy cattle, sheep, wheat, rice, barley, maize and canola.

The Finley Agricultural & Pastoral Association was formed in 1912 and held its first show on 17 September 1913. The same agricultural show is still held annually on the first Sunday in September (Father's Day).

== Heritage ==
The Finley Railway Precinct is listed as a heritage site due to its pioneer station group with the building and platform located at ground level (Yass Town being the only such other building). The yard contains much of the original layout and buildings with intact goods shed, gantry crane, lamp room as well a small second station building.

The site represents the then outer limits of railway expansion, the intense competition between states for trade and the change in attitude to railway construction in the outer areas of New South Wales. It was a terminus from 1898 until the line was extended to Tocumwal in 1914.

== Education ==
Finley has two primary schools, St Joseph's School (Roman Catholic) and Finley Public School. Finley High School attracts students from a wide catchment including the towns of Berrigan, Tocumwal, Jerilderie and Blighty.

Finley is also home to a campus of Riverina TAFE.

== Sport ==
Australian rules football, cricket and netball are all very popular in the town. Sporting teams include the Finley Football Club, which competes in the Murray Football League. The town also offers soccer, touch football, basketball, tennis and a Pony Club.

The Finley Rodeo Committee holds an annual rodeo every January and Finley Apex Club hosts a tractor pull every February.

Finley has an 18-hole green grass golf course and two bowling green locations.

Finley formerly had two rugby league teams, the first of which was the Finley Tigers, which competed in the Group 17 competition and won the 1975 Reserve Grade premiership. Another club, the Southern Riverina Jets, relocated from Tocumwal in the mid-1990s and won four Goulburn Murray Rugby League First Grade titles in 1993, 1994, 1997 and 2002, before folding in 2008.

== Notable residents ==
- Pamela Bone - Journalist and human rights advocate
- Shane Crawford - Former Hawthorn Australian rules footballer and 1999 Brownlow Medallist, 2019 I'm A Celebrity... Get Me Out Of Here contestant
- Justin Crawford, AFL player, brother of Shane
- Craig Giles - musician
- Jack Hawkins - Former Geelong Australian rules footballer
- Tom Hawkins - Former Geelong Australian rules footballer
- Allan Jeans - Former Australian rules football coach, of St Kilda and Hawthorn
- David Murphy - Former Sydney Australian rules footballer
- Members of rock band Spiderbait: Kram, Damian Whitty and Janet English
- Mark Whiley - Former GWS Giants and Carlton Blues Australian rules footballer
