= Constellations (song) =

Single by Darwin Deez

from the album Darwin Deez
- Released: 7 December 2009
- Recorded: 2009
- Genre: Alternative
- Length: 3:16
- Label: Lucky Number
- Songwriter: Darwin Merwan Smith

Darwin Deez singles chronology
"Up in the Clouds" (2010)	"Constellations" (2009)	"Radar Detector" (2010)

"Constellations" is the debut single from alternative band Darwin Deez. It was released in early December 2009 as a digital download and also features on the self-titled debut album: "Darwin Deez". The single was used at the beginning of 90210's second-season finale "Confessions". The single was selected to be the Weekend Anthem by BBC Radio 1 DJ, Reggie Yates which ran from 23–24 October 2010.

== Track listing ==
- Digital Download

No.	Title	Length
1.	"Constellations"	3:16
2.	"The Coma Song"	3:10

- Digital Bundle

No.	Title	Length
1.	"Constellations"	3:17
2.	"The Coma Song"	3:07
3.	"Constellations (Sbtrkt Remix)"	5:47
4.	"Constellations (Totally Extinct Enormous Dinosaurs Mix)"	5:47

== Chart performance ==
Although the single did not chart in the UK upon initial release, "Constellations" did debut at number 31 on the UK Indie Chart on 17 October 2010, the week prior to the re-release. On 24 October, the single climbed 16 places on the Indie Chart to number 15; but also debuted at number 174 on the UK Singles Chart.

Chart (2010)	Peak Position
UK Indie (OCC)	15
UK Singles (OCC)	174

== Release history ==
Region	Date	Format
United Kingdom	6 December 2009	Digital Download
United Kingdom	7 December 2009	12" Vinyl
United Kingdom	17 October 2010	Digital Download Bundle
