= Steve Sedergreen =

Australian jazz musician

Steve Sedergreen (born 1966) is a jazz pianist and educator based in Melbourne, Australia.

== Early life ==
Sedergreen is the oldest son of jazz pianist Bob Sedergreen. He completed a Diploma of Music (Piano) at the Victorian College of the Arts in 1987, a Diploma of Education (Music) at the Hawthorn Institute in 1991, and a Master of Arts (Education) at RMIT University in 2008.

== Career ==
Sedergreen formed Mistaken Identity in 1985 while still at the VCA, has led the band through numerous incarnations and line-ups, and has produced seven recordings. The band supported American saxophonist David Sanborn during his Australian tour of January 1992.

The band's song 'Just Perfect', written by Sedergreen, was nominated for Jazz Composition of the Year at the APRA Music Awards of 1993.

Mistaken Identity has performed at Moomba, Spoleto, the Melbourne Fringe Festival, the Montsalvat Jazz Festival, the Manly Jazz Festival (Sydney), the Wangaratta Festival of Jazz, the Melbourne International Jazz Festival, the Australian Jazz Festival (Canberra), the Kiama Jazz Festival (Kiama, NSW), the Victorian Arts Centre's 'Jazz After Dark' series at the Melbourne Concert Hall, and the Kew Courthouse (2019).

In 1999, Sedergreen founded 'Jazz Cat', bringing together nine selected young musicians from various schools at which he was teaching, to create opportunities for them to perform and record. The band played festivals including 'Jazzabout' (ACT) and the Manly Jazz Festival (Sydney) as well as playing venues in their hometown, Melbourne. 'Jazz Cat' soon morphed into The Cat Empire.

In 2012, Sedergreen released his first solo album, Points in Time, on Newmarket Music.

In 2014, Sedergreen re-formed Mistaken Identity for a benefit gig to raise funds for their late drummer Peter Ayliffe, in a performance which featured guest vocalists Nichaud Fitzgibbon, Julie O'Hara and Hetty Kate.

As a solo artist, or leading ensembles, Sedergreen has performed at the Stonnington Jazz Festival (2015 & 2018), the Eltham Jazz Festival (2015), the Castlemaine State Festival (2015), the White Night Festival (2016) and the Melbourne International Jazz Festival (2018).

As an educator, Sedergreen has taught at multiple tertiary institutions in Melbourne including Monash University, the Box Hill Institute, NMIT, the Centre for Adult Education, RMIT University, and the Victorian College of the Arts, and, with his saxophonist brother Mal, has run Jazz Improvisation classes for the Melbourne Youth Orchestra's Summer programs.

== Discography ==
=== Albums ===
Title	Details
Mistaken Identity: Merry Go Round	Released: 1988; Format: LP; Label: Newmarket Music
Mistaken Identity: Bits & Pieces	Released: 1989; Format: LP; Label: Newmarket Music
Mistaken Identity: Just Perfect	Released: 1992; Format: LP; Label: Newmarket Music
Mistaken Identity: Identify	Released: 1997; Format: CD; Label: Identity Records
Mistaken Identity: Wondering (The Music of Stevie Wonder)	Released: 2002; Format: CD; Label: Newmarket Music
Mistaken Identity - Live	Released: 2009; Format: CD; Label: Newmarket Music
Steve Sedergreen: Points in Time	Released: 2012; Format: CD; Label: Newmarket Music
