= Darwin Deez (album) =

Studio album by Darwin Deez
- Released: 12 April 2010
- Recorded: London; New York City
- Genre: Indie rock
- Length: 32:41
- Label: Lucky Number Music

Darwin Deez chronology
Darwin Deez (2010)	Songs for Imaginative People (2013)

Singles from Darwin Deez
- 1. "Constellations" Released: 7 December 2009; 2. "Radar Detector" Released: 25 April 2010; 3. "Up in the Clouds" Released: 11 July 2010

Professional ratings
Review scores
Source	Rating
Contactmusic.com	link
ClickMusic	link
MusicOMH	link
NME	(04/10/2009, p.43)
Q	4/5 stars
The Independent	link
The Irish Times	link
The Observer	link
The Fly	link

Darwin Deez is the self-titled debut album by New York City-born indie rock singer-songwriter Darwin Deez. It was available in the United Kingdom on 12 April 2010 on CD, digital download and vinyl through the record label Lucky Number Music. On 27 April 2010 it was available to import to the United States.

The album reached No. 61 on the UK Albums Chart, as well as No. 3 on the UK Indie Chart. Darwin Deez toured promoting the album, mainly staying in the United Kingdom. He played over 200 gigs in 18 months, including gigs at BBC Radio 1's student tours in Newcastle and Lincoln, as well as playing to a sell-out crowd at London's Shepherd's Bush Empire, his biggest gig to date.

== Track listing ==
All music is composed by Darwin Deez.

No.	Title	Length
1.	"Constellations"	3:15
2.	"Deep Sea Divers"	3:38
3.	"The City"	3:23
4.	"DNA"	2:51
5.	"The Suicide Song"	2:26
6.	"Up in the Clouds"	3:33
7.	"Bed Space"	3:32
8.	"The Bomb Song"	3:48
9.	"Radar Detector"	3:09
10.	"Bad Day"	3:06

== Singles ==
Year	Title	Peak Positions		Album
Year	Title	UK	UK IND	Album
2009	"Constellations"	–	–	Darwin Deez
2010	"Radar Detector"	62	5	Darwin Deez
2010	"Up In The Clouds"	–	36	Darwin Deez
2010	"Constellations" (re-release)	174	15	Darwin Deez
