= Darwin Deez =

American indie band

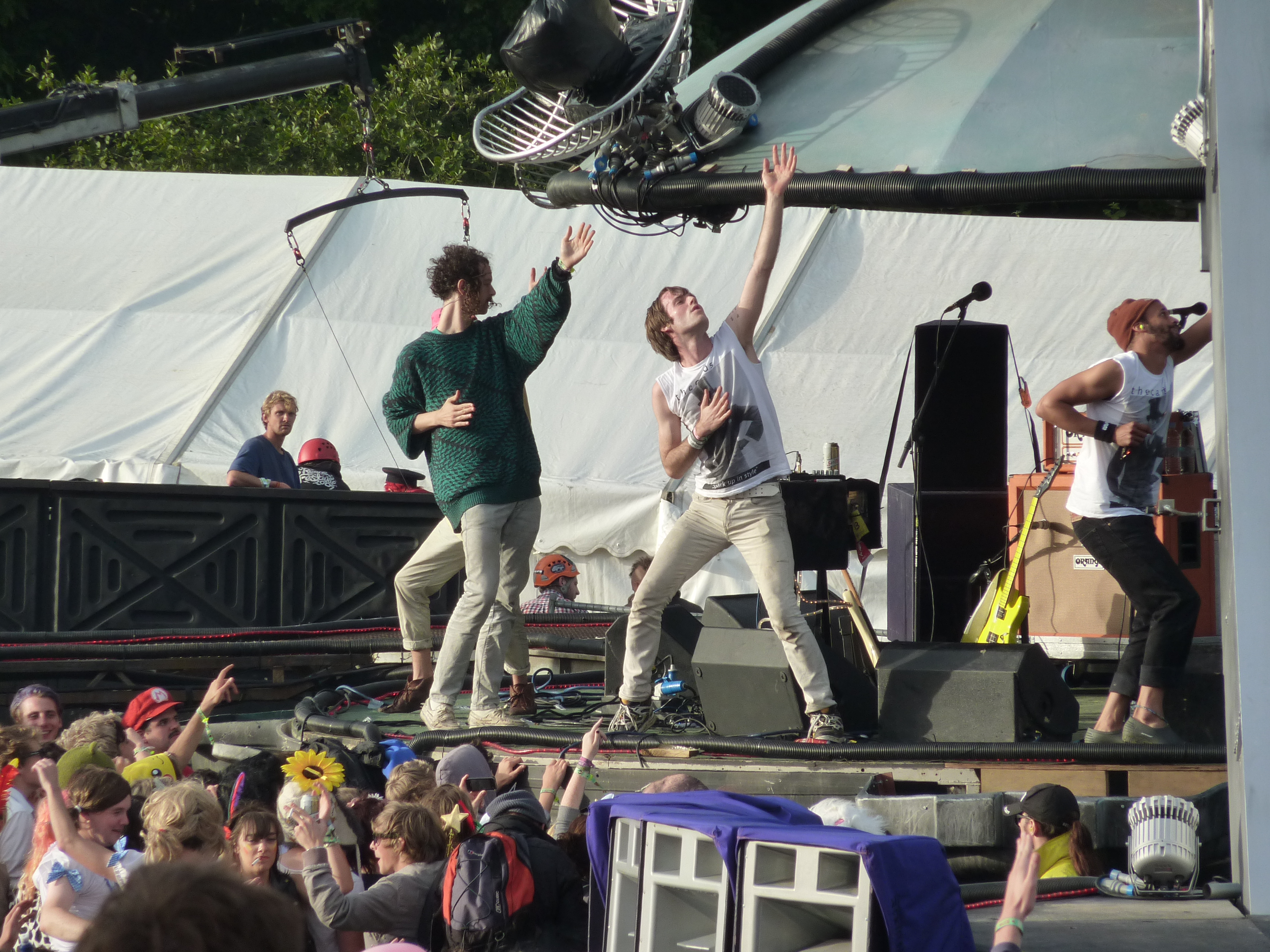
- Darwin Deez performing at Bestival 2010

Background information
- Origin: New York, New York, United States
- Genres: Indie pop; indie rock
- Years active: 2009–present
- Label: Lucky Number Music
- Members: Darwin Merwan Smith; Greg Richardson; Andrew Hoepfner; Tim McCoy
- Past members: Angela Carlucci; Zachary Cole Smith; Michelle Dorrance; Nicholas Van Young
- Website: darwindeez.com

Darwin Deez is an American indie band from New York City signed to music label Lucky Number Music. The group's frontman, Darwin Deez (Darwin Merwan Smith), grew up in Chapel Hill, North Carolina, attended Wesleyan University, and has been a guitarist for Creaky Boards. Darwin Smith lives in Brooklyn, New York.

== History ==
The band began to receive public attention in the United Kingdom during late 2009, which followed the release of the band's debut single, "Constellations". In April 2010, the band released their second single, "Radar Detector", which reached number 62 in the UK Singles Chart, number 5 on the UK Indie Chart. He has appeared on the cover of the NME and was placed in the Top 10 of their annual Cool List. The band's self-titled debut album, Darwin Deez, was released on 12 April 2010 in the United Kingdom and on 22 February 2011 in the United States. The third single from the album, "Up In The Clouds", was released on 12 July 2010.

In February 2011, they released a mixtape titled Wonky Beats and announced in a March interview at the SXSW music festival that they'd made it free to download. Darwin Deez embarked on a tour of Australia in April 2011, during which time they played at the Groovin the Moo festival and a number of side-shows.

In February 2013, Darwin Deez released their second album titled Songs for Imaginative People and went on tour to support the album.

Darwin Deez released their third studio album, titled Double Down, on September 18, 2015, via Lucky Number.

Their latest album, 10 Songs That Happened When You Left Me with My Stupid Heart, was released in 2018.

In 2018, the band embarked on a House Show Tour, booking performances at fans' homes across the country. The tour was filmed as a documentary by Sound It Out films.

== Discography ==
=== Albums ===
Year	Album details	Chart Peak Positions	
Year	Album details	UK	UK IND
2010	Darwin Deez: Released: 10 May 2010; Genre: Indie pop; Label: Lucky Number; Format: LP record, CD, digital download	61	3
2013	Songs for Imaginative People: Released: 11 February 2013; Genre: Indie rock; Label: Lucky Number; Format: LP record, CD, digital download	91	—
2015	Double Down: Released: 18 September 2015; Genre: Indie rock; Label: Lucky Number; Format: LP record, CD, digital download	—	—
2018	10 Songs That Happened When You Left Me with My Stupid Heart: Released: 31 August 2018; Genre: Indie rock, electronic; Label: Lucky Number; Format: LP record, CD, digital download	—	—
2024	Of Course I Still Love You: Released: 17 December 2024; Genre: Indie rock, electronic; Label: Lucky Number; Format: digital download	–	–

=== Mixtapes ===
Year	Album details	Chart Peak Positions	
Year	Album details	UK	UK IND
2011	Wonky Beats: Released: 25 January 2011; Genre: Hip Hop/Rap; Label: N/A (Self Released); Format: digital download	—	—

=== Singles ===
Year	Title	Peak Positions		Album
Year	Title	UK	UK IND	Album
2009	"Constellations"	–	–	Darwin Deez
2010	"Radar Detector"	62	5	Darwin Deez
2010	"Up In The Clouds"	120	13	Darwin Deez
2010	"Constellations" (re-release)	174	15	Darwin Deez
2010	"Bad Day"	–	–	Darwin Deez
2012	"You Can't Be My Girl"	—	—	Songs For Imaginative People
2013	"Free (The Editorial Me)"	—	—	Songs For Imaginative People
2015	"Kill Your Attitude"	—	—	Double Down
2015	"Time Machine"	—	—	Double Down
2015	"The Mess She Made"	—	—	Double Down
2018	"The World's Best Kisser"	—	—	10 Songs That Happened When You Left Me with My Stupid Heart
2018	"Queen of Spades"	—	—	10 Songs That Happened When You Left Me with My Stupid Heart
2018	"Say It First"	—	—	10 Songs That Happened When You Left Me with My Stupid Heart
2021	"The Birthday Song"	—	—	Good Ribbons EP
2024	"Caroline"	—	—	TBA

=== Music videos ===
Year	Title	Director
2010	"Radar Detector"	Ace Norton
2010	"Up In the Clouds"	Tom Kingsley
2010	"Constellations"	Terri Timely
2010	"DNA"	Miles Crawford
2012	"Free (The Editorial Me)"	Ninian Doff
2013	"You Can't Be My Girl"	Keith Schofield
2015	"Kill Your Attitude"	Dent De Cuir
2015	"The Mess She Made"	Oscar Hudson
2018	"The World's Best Kisser"	
2018	"Say It First"	Darwin Smith

== Nominations ==
- Berlin Music Video Awards, Best Concept for 'The Mess She Made'
- Berlin Music Video Awards, Best VFX for 'KILL YOUR ATTITUDE'
