= Craig Giles =

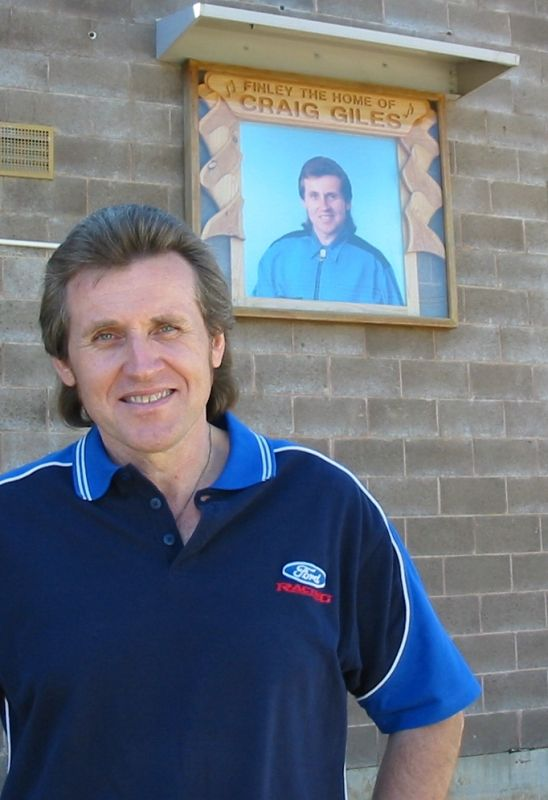
- Craig with his plaque in Finley, 2014

Background information
- Born: Craig Giles; Temora, New South Wales, Australia
- Genres: Country, Ballads
- Years active: 1988–present
- Label: Big River Entertainment

Craig Giles is an Australian musician. Also known as 'Mr. Versatile', he is best known for his country music and ballad singing, and tours around Australia and across the world.

== Personal life ==
Giles currently resides in Temora with his wife Roz, who is the head of entertainment agency, Big River Entertainment.

== Awards and achievements ==
- 1998 – Inducted into the Australian Country Music Hands of Fame
- 2000 – Best Country Male Entertainer in A.C.M.L.A. People's Choice Awards
- 2003 – Nominated in the C.M.A.A. Top Ten Independent Entertainers of the Year
- 2005 – Open Contemporary Section of the Tasmanian & New Zealand Songwriters Contest
- 2006 – Australian Artist on Tour in the National Australian Country Recording Awards
- 2007 – Finalist in Male Vocal, Album & Song sections of the People's Choice Awards
- 2007 – Australian Artist on Tour in the National Australian Country Recording Awards
- 2008 – Finalist in Bush Ballad section of the Horsham Music Awards
- 2009 – Country Artist on Tour at the A.C.A. Awards

== Discography ==
- Craig Giles Sings for You (1988)
- 25th Anniversary Album (2013)
