= Roaring Jack =

- Origin: Sydney, Australia
- Genres: Celtic punk
- Years active: 1985–1992
- Label: Mighty Boy
- Past members: Alistair Hulett; Rod Gilchrist; Dave Williams; Rab Mannell; Steph Miller; Steve Thompson; Hunter Owens

Roaring Jack was an Australian Celtic punk/folk punk band of the 1980s and 1990s. The band was nominated for two ARIA Music Awards during their career.

The band's singer Alistair Hulett died at the Southern General Hospital in Glasgow of liver failure and cancer on 28 January 2010. Rod Gilchrist died in 1998 and Steve Thompson in 2000.

== History ==
Roaring Jack played all over Australia from 1985 to 1992 and developed a huge cult following. Their debut EP Street Celtability was recorded and produced at Studios 301 in Sydney in July 1987. First album The Cat Among the Pigeons was released in November 1988.

== Discography ==
=== Albums ===
Title	Details
Street Celtability	Released: 1987; Label: Mighty Boy (MBEP0002); Format: Vinyl
The Cat Among the Pigeons	Released: November 1988; Label: Mighty Boy (MBLP7007); Format: Vinyl, CD
Through the Smoke of Innocence	Released: November 1990; Label: Mighty Boy (MBLP7016); Format: Vinyl, CD
Roaring Jack - The Complete Works	Released: 2002; Label: Jump Up Records; Format: CD

=== Singles ===
Year	Title	Album
1988	"The Thin Red Line"	The Cat Among the Pigeons
1988	"Destitution Road"	The Cat Among the Pigeons
1989	"The Swaggies Have All Waltzed Matilda Away"	The Cat Among the Pigeons
1991	"Framed"	non-album single

== Awards ==
=== ARIA Music Awards ===
The ARIA Music Awards is an annual awards ceremony that recognises excellence, innovation, and achievement across all genres of Australian music. Roaring Jack were nominated for two awards.

Year	Nominee / work	Award	Result
1989	The Cat Among the Pigeons	Best New Talent	Nominated
1991	Through the Smoke of Innocence	Best Independent Release	Nominated
