= Alistair Hulett =

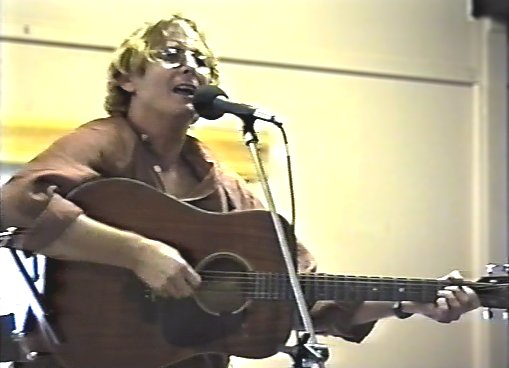
- Alistair Hulett on stage at the 1996 Tamar Valley Folk Festival, George Town, Australia

Background information
- Born: 15 October 1951
- Origin: Glasgow, Scotland
- Died: 28 January 2010 (aged 58) Glasgow, Scotland
- Genre: Folk
- Years active: 1980s–2010
- Formerly of: Roaring Jack, Dave Swarbrick, The Malkies
- Website: http://www.alistairhulett.com/

Alistair Hulett (15 October 1951 – 28 January 2010) was a Scottish acoustic folk singer best known as the singer of the folk punk band, Roaring Jack.

== Early life ==
Born in Glasgow, Hulett discovered traditional music as an early teen and began playing the folk circuit in New Zealand in 1968, after immigrating with his family. By 1971, he relocated to Australia, continuing to perform at festivals. In the early 1980s, Hulett founded the folk punk five piece, Roaring Jack, and opened for international acts such as Billy Bragg, The Pogues and The Men They Couldn't Hang. The band was nominated for two ARIA Music Awards during their career.

== Solo career ==
Hullett's first solo CD, Dance of the Underclass, was released in 1991 and was completely acoustic, featuring contributions from other members of Roaring Jack, and a rendition of The Internationale. "Dance of the Underclass" established Hulett as a key contemporary Australian writer, with several of the songs now regarded as modern Australian standards. One of the CD's songs He Fades Away, concerning the death of an Australian blue asbestos miner, was covered by Roy Bailey and June Tabor, and later by Andy Irvine. Both He Fades Away and Blue Murder were featured on the Niamh Parsons album Old Simplicity.

A second album, In The Back Streets of Paradise, was released in 1994, and was a collection of songs originally intended as the next Roaring Jack's release. This CD featured long-term collaborator, Jimmy Gregory, with whom Hulett played in a duo for many years on the Sydney folk circuit. The release of In The Back Streets of Paradise coincided with the formation of a new touring band Alistair Hulett and The Hooligans, featuring Lindsay Martin (fiddle), John Deery (uilleann pipes), Jimmy Gregory (Bouzouki), James Fagan (Bouzouki and clarinet) and Phil Murray (accordion).

== Later music ==
In addition to his solo albums, Hulett worked with Dave Swarbrick of Fairport Convention, producing three albums, and, towards the end of his life, formed a new band, The Malkies, with whom he released one album. He also sang on six songs on the Linn Records 12 CD Complete Songs of Robert Burns project.

== Political beliefs ==
In 1991, while living in Australia, Hulett joined the International Socialist Organisation after becoming radicalised by the Gulf War. In 1995, Hulett co-founded the Australian Trotskyist organisation Socialist Alternative, while often playing political benefits and rallies with Roaring Jack.

Hulett wrote songs in support of Indigenous Australians, the Builders Labourers Federation, the Maritime Union of Australia, Scottish socialist John Maclean and Chilean singer-songwriter and political activist Victor Jara, and songs attacking Stalinism, Australian Imperialism, former Australian Labor Party Prime Ministers Bob Hawke and Ben Chifley, Postmodernists and Canadian singer-songwriter Leonard Cohen over his support for Israel.

After returning to his native Glasgow in the late 1990s, Alistair was, until his death, an active member of the Socialist Workers Party.

== Illness and death ==
Hulett became acutely ill on New Year's Day 2010 and was hospitalised on 5 January with suspected food poisoning. Liver failure was later diagnosed and it was hoped that he could receive a liver transplant, but further investigation revealed a very aggressive metastatic cancer which had already spread to his lungs and stomach. Hulett died on 28 January 2010 at the Southern General Hospital in Glasgow, only days after the cancer was first detected. He was survived by his second wife, Fatima Uygun.

== Album discography ==
With Roaring Jack

- Street Celtability 12" EP, 1987
- Cat Among The Pigeons, 1988
- Through The Smoke of Innocence, 1990
- The Complete Works of Roaring Jack (German compilation), 2003

Solo

- Dance of the Underclass, 1991
- In The Back Streets of Paradise, 1994
- In Sleepy Scotland, 2001
- Riches And Rags, 2006

With Dave Swarbrick

- Saturday Johnny and Jimmy The Rat, 1996
- The Cold Grey Light of Dawn, 1998
- Red Clydeside, 2002

With The Malkies

- Suited and Booted, 2008
