= A Fine, Fine Day =

Single by Tony Carey

from the album Some Tough City
- B-side: "Say It's All Over"
- Released: 1984
- Recorded: West Germany
- Genre: Rock
- Length: 4:24
- Label: MCA
- Songwriter: Tony Carey
- Producer: Peter Hauke

Tony Carey singles chronology
"West Coast Summer Nights" (1982)	"A Fine, Fine Day" (1984)	"The First Day of Summer" (1984)

"A Fine, Fine Day" is a single released by American singer and keyboardist Tony Carey. It is the opening track on his 1984 album, Some Tough City.

The song, written by Carey, spent 15 weeks on the Billboard Hot 100, peaking at #22. The music video was directed by Storm Thorgerson.

It is Carey's highest charting single and one of two to make the top-40, with the other being "The First Day of Summer." It also peaked at #1 on the Mainstream Rock (chart).

== Critical reception ==
The song received generally positive reviews. Jim Angell of the Tri City Herald said, "there's no doubt A Fine, Fine Day...is a fine, fine song," while the Chicago Tribune called it a "powerful hit." Saw Tek Meng of the New Straits Times called it "a fine opener [to Some Tough City]."
