= List of Split Enz members =

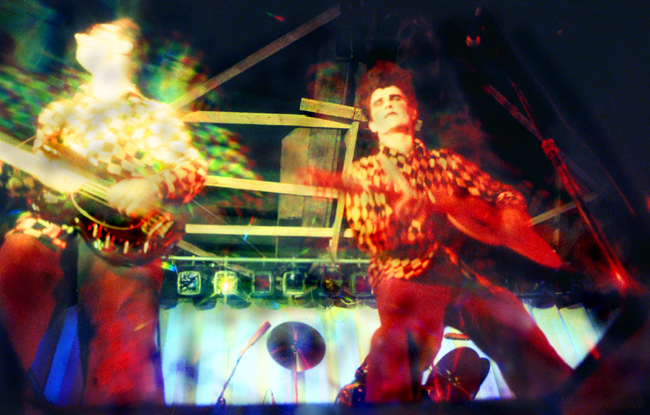
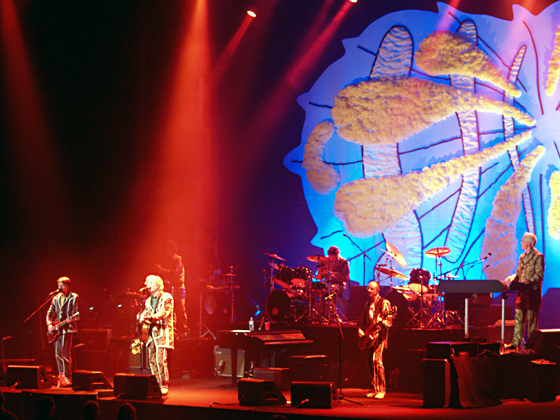
Members of Split Enz performing in 1979 (top) and 2006 (bottom).

Split Enz were a New Zealand new wave band from Auckland. Formed in October 1972, the group originally consisted of vocalist and pianist Tim Finn, vocalist and guitarist Phil Judd, bassist Mike Chunn, violinist Miles Golding and flautist Mike Howard. The band remained active until December 1984, undergoing many lineup changes. The final lineup featured Finn, keyboardist Eddie Rayner, percussionist Noel Crombie (both since 1974), bassist Nigel Griggs, vocalist/guitarist Neil Finn (both since 1977), and drummer Paul Hester (since 1983). Since disbanding, Split Enz have reunited on a number of occasions.

== History ==
=== 1972–77 ===
Brian (Tim) Finn and Phil Judd formed Split Ends as an acoustic group in October 1972, adding bassist Jonathan (Mike) Chunn, violinist Miles Golding and flautist Mike Howard. Chunn's younger brother Geoff played drums at the quintet's first show on 10 December 1972. David "Div" Vercoe joined in time for the recording of the band's debut single "For You" in February 1973, before he was dismissed soon after for being difficult to work with. Golding also left after the single's recording, at which time the group became an electric outfit, Paul "Wally" Wilkinson (lead guitar) joined the band and drummer Geoff Chunn joined full time. During early rehearsals with the new members, Wikinson's electric guitar drowned out Howard's flute, leading the latter to also leave the band. By late 1973, the band had released their second single "The Sweet Talkin' Spoon Song", the b-side of which, "129", featured Robert Gillies on saxophone.

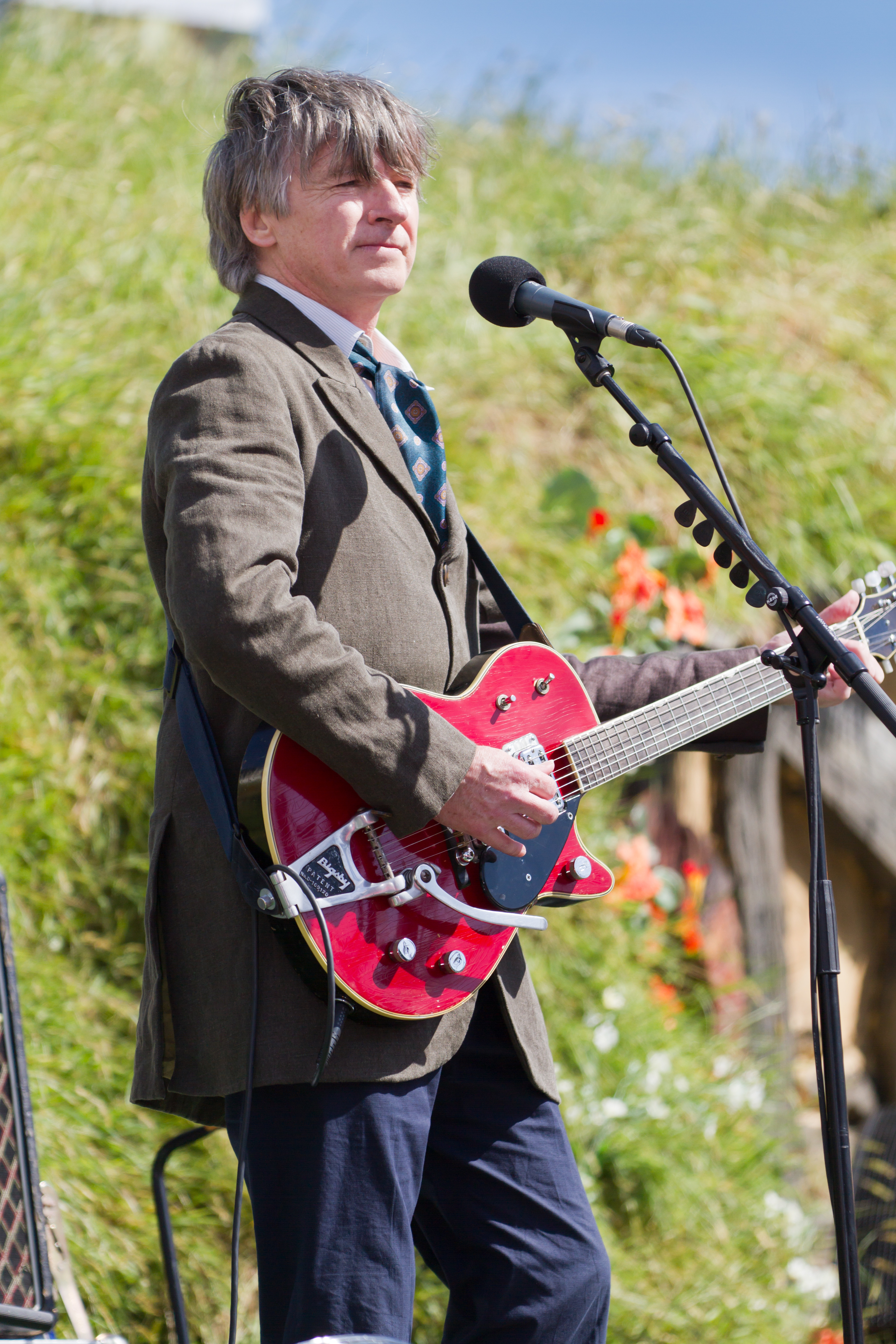
Neil Finn, younger brother of the band's frontman Tim, joined Split Enz in April 1977 after Phil Judd left.

In early 1974, Split Ends changed the spelling of their name to Split Enz, and expanded to a seven-piece lineup with the addition of Eddie Rayner on keyboards and Robert Gillies becoming a full member on saxophone and trumpet. During the summer, Gillies left, Geoff Chunn was replaced by Paul (Emlyn) Crowther, and Geoff (Noel) Crombie joined on percussion. This lineup issued the group's debut full-length album Mental Notes in 1975. By November, Wilkinson had been fired and replaced by Gillies. After 1976's follow-up Second Thoughts, several more changes in personnel followed – in December 1976, Crowther was replaced by Malcolm Green, Judd and Chunn left at the end of a North American tour in March, and Finn replaced them with his brother Neil and Nigel Griggs, respectively, in time for a British tour which started the next month. This new lineup issued Dizrythmia later in the year.

=== 1977–84 ===
By early 1978, Split Enz had parted ways with their record company Chrysalis Records, Robert Gillies had left the band for a second time, and Phil Judd had returned briefly before leaving just a few weeks later. After a number of recording sessions which remained unreleased until 2007 in the form of The Rootin Tootin Luton Tapes, the six-piece group issued Frenzy in 1979, followed by True Colours in 1980 and Waiata in 1981. Shortly after the latter's release, drummer Malcolm Green left the band and moved to Australia following "disagreements regarding [his] songwriting and inclusion of his songs on the band's albums".

Green was not replaced, with percussionist Noel Crombie taking over his role. As a five-piece, Split Enz issued Time and Tide and Conflicting Emotions, before Paul Hester took over on drums for the Conflicting Emotions Tour at the end of 1983, with Crombie moving back to percussion. Just a few months into the tour, however, with tensions growing between himself and his brother, Tim Finn announced on 16 June 1984 that he was leaving Split Enz, leaving the group with no original members. The group began recording a new album with Neil Finn as band leader, although he was uncomfortable continuing the band without any of its founders, and decided the resulting See Ya 'Round would be Split Enz's last album. After the album's release Tim Finn rejoined the band for the final Enz with a Bang! Tour, which began on 30 September 1984. Split Enz's final show took place on 4 December 1984. Neil Finn and Paul Hester went on to form Crowded House the following year.

=== From 1984 ===
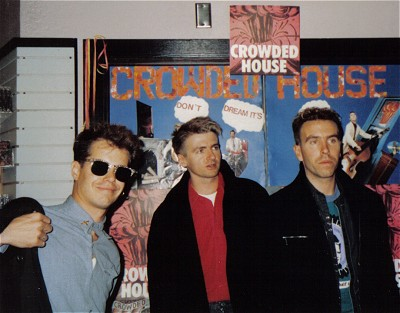
After Split Enz disbanded, Neil Finn and Paul Hester formed Crowded House, with whom Split Enz would tour several times in later years.

Since their breakup in 1984, Split Enz have reunited on a number of occasions. The first reunion took place on 5 April 1986 at the Rainbow Warrior Music Festival, a benefit concert for Greenpeace held at Auckland's Mount Smart Stadium. Joined again by Tim Finn, the reunited group also performed at the debut show of Crowded House, the new band of Neil Finn and Paul Hester, two months later. The second reunion followed in December 1989 when the group played four shows in Australia, again with Crowded House, followed by a show in February 1990 to benefit the victims of an earthquake in Newcastle, New South Wales which killed the tour's manager.

To mark the 20th anniversary of the formation of Split Enz, as well as the release of Mike Chunn's autobiography Stranger than Fiction: The Life and Times of Split Enz, several former members of the group performed a set at Auckland's Wynyard Tavern on 10 December 1992 – exactly 20 years after their live debut at the same venue. A full reunion tour of New Zealand followed in March 1993, with Nigel Griggs and Paul Hester returning again. In December 1999, Split Enz reunited for a fifth time to perform at the Millennium Concert in Auckland. A sixth reunion followed three years later to mark the 30th anniversary of the band's formation and live debut.

On 14 July 2005, Split Enz performed at their induction into the ARIA Hall of Fame in Melbourne. Less than three months previously, Hester had committed suicide after "a long battle with depression". For the Hall of Fame performance, 1976–1981 Split Enz drummer Malcolm Green took his place. The same lineup returned the following June for a short tour of Australia. Another reunion tour followed in March 2008, with four shows in New Zealand featuring John Butler Trio drummer Michael Barker in place of the unavailable Green. A final one-off reunion performance (with Green on drums) took place on 14 March 2009 as part of the Sound Relief festival.

In a 2018 interview, keyboardist Eddie Rayner predicted that Split Enz would not reunite again, explaining that "Everybody's got too much going on in their lives". However, in November 2025, it was announced the band would be reuniting for a tour in May 2026, with a lineup of Tim, Neil, Crombie and Rayner alongside Matt Eccles on drums and James Milne on bass.

== Members ==
Image	Name	Years active	Instruments	Release contributions
	Brian (Tim) Finn	1972–1984 (plus all reunions)	lead and backing vocals; piano; guitar (from 1975); tambourine	all Split Enz releases except See Ya 'Round (1984)
	Phil Judd	1972–1977; 1978	lead and backing vocals; guitar; mandolin	all Split Enz releases from "For You" (1973) to "Another Great Divide" (1977)
	Jonathan (Mike) Chunn	1972–1977 (plus reunions in 1992, 2002)	bass; piano	all Split Enz releases from "For You" (1973) to "Another Great Divide" (1977)
	Miles Golding	1972–1973 (session guest in 1976)	violin	"For You" (1973); Second Thoughts (1976) – two tracks only
	Mike Howard	1972–1973	flute	"For You" (1973)
	David "Div" Vercoe	1973	drums	"For You" (1973)
	Paul "Wally" Wilkinson	1973–1975	guitar	all Split Enz releases from "Sweet Talkin' Spoon Song" (1973) to Mental Notes (1975)
	Geoff Chunn	1972 (one-off); 1973–1974 (plus reunions in 1992, 2002)	drums; guitar (1992, 2002)	"Sweet Talkin' Spoon Song" (1973); "No Bother To Me" (1975)
	Robert Gillies	1974; 1975–1978 (session guest in 1973) (plus reunions in 1992, 2002)	saxophone; trumpet	Sweet Talkin' Spoon Song" (1973); all releases from Second Thoughts (1976) to Dizrythmia (1977)
	Tony (Eddie) Rayner	1974–1984 (plus all reunions)	keyboards; percussion; piano; backing vocals	all Split Enz releases from "No Bother to Me" (1975) onwards
	Paul (Emlyn) Crowther	1974–1976 (plus reunions in 1992, 2002)	drums	all Split Enz releases from Mental Notes (1975) to Second Thoughts (1976)
	Geoff (Noel) Crombie	1974–1984 (plus all reunions)	percussion; drums (1981–1983, 1992); backing vocals	all Split Enz releases from Mental Notes (1975) onwards
	Malcolm Green	1976–1981 (plus reunions in 2005, 2006, 2009)	drums; backing vocals	all Split Enz releases from "Another Great Divide" (1977) to Waiata (1981); Live in America (2007); The Rootin Tootin Luton Tapes (2007)
	Nigel Griggs	1977–1984 (plus reunions in 1986, 1989, 1990, 1993, 1999, 2005, 2006, 2008, 2009)	bass; backing vocals	all Split Enz releases from Dizrythmia (1977) onwards
	Neil Finn	1977–1984 (plus all reunions)	lead and backing vocals; guitar; mandolin; piano	all Split Enz releases from Dizrythmia (1977) onwards
	Paul Hester	1983–1984 (plus reunions in 1986, 1989, 1990, 1993) (died 2005)	drums; backing vocals	all Split Enz releases from See Ya 'Round (1984) to Extravagenza (2005)
	Michael Barker	2008 (touring)	drums; backing vocals	Live, Alive Oh. (2017)

== Lineups ==
Period	Members	Releases
October 1972 – January 1973 (as Split Ends)	Tim Finn – vocals, piano, tambourine; Mike Chunn – bass, piano; Phil Judd – vocals, guitar, mandolin; Mike Howard – flute; Miles Golding – violin	none – live performances only
January–March 1973 (as Split Ends)	Tim Finn – vocals, piano, tambourine; Mike Chunn – bass, piano; Phil Judd – vocals, guitar, mandolin; Mike Howard – flute; Miles Golding – violin; Div Vercoe – drums	"For You" (1973); The Beginning of the Enz (1979) - two tracks
March–April 1973 (as Split Ends)	Tim Finn – vocals, piano, tambourine; Mike Chunn – bass, piano; Phil Judd – vocals, rhythm guitar, mandolin; Mike Howard – flute; Wally Wilkinson – lead guitar; Geoff Chunn – drums	none – rehearsals only
April 1973 – February 1974 (as Split Ends)	Tim Finn – vocals, piano, tambourine; Mike Chunn – bass, piano; Phil Judd – vocals, rhythm guitar, mandolin; Wally Wilkinson – lead guitar; Geoff Chunn – drums	"The Sweet Talkin' Spoon Song" (1973); The Beginning of the Enz (1979) - three tracks
February–June 1974 (Split Enz from this point on)	Tim Finn – lead vocals, piano, tambourine; Mike Chunn – bass, piano; Phil Judd – lead vocals, rhythm guitar, mandolin; Wally Wilkinson – lead guitar; Geoff Chunn – drums; Eddie Rayner – keyboards, backing vocals; Robert Gillies – saxophone, trumpet	"No Bother to Me" (1975); The Beginning of the Enz (1979) - four tracks
June–July 1974	Tim Finn – lead vocals, piano, tambourine; Mike Chunn – bass, piano; Phil Judd – lead vocals, rhythm guitar, mandolin; Wally Wilkinson – lead guitar; Eddie Rayner – keyboards, backing vocals; Emlyn Crowther – drums	none – live performances only
July 1974 – November 1975	Tim Finn – lead vocals, piano, tambourine; Mike Chunn – bass, piano; Phil Judd – lead vocals, rhythm guitar, mandolin; Wally Wilkinson – lead guitar; Eddie Rayner – keyboards, backing vocals; Emlyn Crowther – drums; Noel Crombie – percussion, backing vocals	Mental Notes (1975)
November 1975 – December 1976	Tim Finn – lead vocals, piano, rhythm guitar; Mike Chunn – bass, piano; Phil Judd – lead vocals, lead guitar, mandolin; Eddie Rayner – keyboards, backing vocals; Emlyn Crowther – drums; Noel Crombie – percussion, backing vocals; Robert Gillies – saxophone, trumpet	"Late Last Night" (1976); Second Thoughts (1976); Split Enz DVD (2002) - three tracks
December 1976 – March 1977	Tim Finn – lead vocals, piano, rhythm guitar; Mike Chunn – bass, piano; Phil Judd – lead vocals, lead guitar, mandolin; Eddie Rayner – keyboards, backing vocals; Noel Crombie – percussion, backing vocals; Robert Gillies – saxophone, trumpet; Malcolm Green – drums, backing vocals	"Another Great Divide" (1977)
April 1977 – February 1978	Tim Finn – lead vocals, piano, rhythm guitar; Eddie Rayner – keyboards, backing vocals; Noel Crombie – percussion, backing vocals; Robert Gillies – saxophone, trumpet; Malcolm Green – drums, backing vocals; Neil Finn – lead guitar, mandolin, vocals; Nigel Griggs – bass, backing vocals	Dizrythmia (1977); Split Enz DVD (2002) - five tracks
February–March 1978	Tim Finn – lead vocals, piano, rhythm guitar; Eddie Rayner – keyboards, backing vocals; Noel Crombie – percussion, backing vocals; Malcolm Green – drums, backing vocals; Neil Finn – lead guitar, mandolin, vocals; Nigel Griggs – bass, backing vocals; Phil Judd – rhythm and lead guitar, mandolin, vocals	none – live performances only
March 1978 – May 1981	Tim Finn – lead vocals, piano, rhythm guitar; Eddie Rayner – keyboards, backing vocals; Noel Crombie – percussion, backing vocals; Malcolm Green – drums, backing vocals; Neil Finn – lead guitar, mandolin, vocals; Nigel Griggs – bass, backing vocals	Frenzy (1979); "Things" (1979); True Colours (1980); Live in Concert VHS (1980); Waiata (1981); Split Enz DVD (2002) - nine tracks; Live in America (2007); The Rootin Tootin Luton Tapes (2007)
May 1981 – November 1983	Tim Finn – lead vocals, piano, rhythm guitar; Eddie Rayner – keyboards, backing vocals; Noel Crombie – drums, percussion, vocals; Neil Finn – lead guitar, mandolin, vocals; Nigel Griggs – bass, backing vocals; Note: Former members Mike Chunn, Robert Gillies and Emlyn Crowther guested with the band at two concerts in early 1983.	Time and Tide (1982); Video LP VHS (1982); "Next Exit" (1983); Conflicting Emotions (1983); See Ya 'Round (1984) - one track; Split Enz DVD (2002) - six tracks
November 1983 – May 1984	Tim Finn – lead vocals, piano, rhythm guitar; Eddie Rayner – keyboards, backing vocals; Noel Crombie – percussion, backing vocals; Neil Finn – lead guitar, mandolin, vocals; Nigel Griggs – bass, backing vocals; Paul Hester – drums, backing vocals	none – live performances only
May–September 1984	Eddie Rayner – keyboards, backing vocals; Noel Crombie – percussion, vocals; Neil Finn – lead vocals, guitar, mandolin; Nigel Griggs – bass, vocals; Paul Hester – drums, vocals	See Ya 'Round (1984) - remaining tracks; Split Enz DVD (2002) - one track
September–December 1984	Eddie Rayner – keyboards, backing vocals; Noel Crombie – percussion, backing vocals; Neil Finn – lead vocals, lead guitar, mandolin; Nigel Griggs – bass, backing vocals; Paul Hester – drums, backing vocals; Tim Finn – lead vocals, piano, rhythm guitar	The Living Enz (1985); Split Enz DVD (2002) - three tracks
Officially split December 1984, temporary reunions afterwards
22 April 1986 December 1989 – February 1990	Eddie Rayner – keyboards, backing vocals; Noel Crombie – percussion, backing vocals; Neil Finn – lead vocals, lead guitar, mandolin; Nigel Griggs – bass, backing vocals; Paul Hester – drums, backing vocals; Tim Finn – lead vocals, piano, rhythm guitar	none – live performances only
10 December 1992	Eddie Rayner – keyboards, backing vocals; Noel Crombie – drums (select songs); Neil Finn – electric guitar, vocals (select songs); Tim Finn – lead vocals, acoustic guitar; Mike Chunn – bass; Geoff Chunn – electric guitar (select songs); Robert Gillies – saxophone; Emlyn Crowther – drums (select songs)	none – live performances only
March 1993	Eddie Rayner – keyboards, backing vocals; Noel Crombie – percussion, backing vocals; Neil Finn – lead vocals, lead guitar, mandolin; Tim Finn – lead vocals, piano, rhythm guitar; Nigel Griggs – bass, backing vocals; Paul Hester – drums, backing vocals	Anniversary (1994); Split Enz DVD (2002) - one track; Extravagenza (2005); Live, Alive Oh. (2017) - disc 1
December 1999	Eddie Rayner – keyboards, backing vocals; Noel Crombie – drums, backing vocals; Neil Finn – lead vocals, lead guitar, mandolin; Tim Finn – lead vocals, piano, rhythm guitar; Nigel Griggs – bass, backing vocals	none – live performances only
December 2002	Eddie Rayner – keyboards, backing vocals; Noel Crombie – percussion, backing vocals; Neil Finn – lead vocals, lead guitar (select songs); Tim Finn – lead vocals, rhythm guitar; Mike Chunn – bass; Geoff Chunn – lead guitar (select songs); Robert Gillies – saxophone; Emlyn Crowther – drums	none – live performances only
14 July 2005 June 2006	Eddie Rayner – keyboards, backing vocals; Noel Crombie – percussion, backing vocals; Neil Finn – lead vocals, lead guitar, mandolin; Tim Finn – lead vocals, piano, rhythm guitar; Nigel Griggs – bass, backing vocals; Malcolm Green – drums, backing vocals	One Out of the Bag (2007)
March 2008 14 March 2009	Eddie Rayner – keyboards, backing vocals; Noel Crombie – percussion, backing vocals; Neil Finn – electric guitar, vocals; Tim Finn – lead vocals, acoustic guitar; Nigel Griggs – bass, backing vocals; Michael Barker – drums	Live, Alive Oh. (2017) - disc 2
March 2026 May 2026	Eddie Rayner – keyboards, backing vocals; Noel Crombie – percussion, backing vocals; Neil Finn – electric guitar, vocals; Tim Finn – lead vocals, acoustic guitar; James Milne – bass, backing vocals; Matt Eccles – drums	none – live performances only
