= Split Enz discography =

- Studio albums: 9
- Live albums: 5
- Compilation albums: 11
- Tribute albums: 5
- Singles: 32
- B-sides: 44
- Video albums: 6
- Music videos: 25

This is a complete discography listing for Split Enz, a New Zealand-originated experimental rock-pop group. Their creative output includes several albums, singles, music videos, compilations as well as albums paying tribute to them with covers by other artists.

They have had eight songs listed in the APRA Top 100 New Zealand Songs of All Time, more than any other band.

== Albums ==
=== Studio albums ===
List of albums, with selected chart positions and certifications
| Title | Album details | Peak chart positions | | | | | | Certifications |
| Title | Album details | NZ | AUS | CAN | NL | UK | US | Certifications |
|---|---|---|---|---|---|---|---|---|
| Mental Notes | Released: 31 July 1975; Label: White Cloud (WCL 101); Format: LP | 7 | 35 | — | — | — | — | |
| Second Thoughts (titled Mental Notes in Europe and North America) | Released: August 1976; Label: Mushroom (L 35981); Format: LP, cassette | 18 | 25 | — | — | — | — | |
| Dizrythmia | Released: 29 August 1977; Label: Mushroom (L 36347); Format: LP, cassette | 3 | 18 | — | — | — | — | AUS: Gold |
| Frenzy | Released: 19 February 1979; Label: Mushroom (L 36768); Format: LP, cassette | 13 | 24 | 49 | — | — | — | RIANZ: Gold; AUS: Gold; MC: 40,000 copies |
| True Colours | Released: 21 January 1980; Label: Polydor (ENZ 1); Format: LP, cassette | 1 | 1 | 10 | 27 | 38 | 40 | NZ: Multi Platinum; AUS: 5× Platinum; MC: 2× Platinum |
| Waiata (titled Corroboree in Australia) | Released: March 1981; Label: Polydor (ENZ 2); Format: LP, cassette | 1 | 1 | 17 | — | — | 45 | AUS: 3× Platinum; CAN: Platinum |
| Time and Tide | Released: April 1982; Label: Polydor (ENZ 3); Format: LP, cassette | 1 | 1 | 4 | — | 71 | 58 | NZ: 2× Platinum; AUS: 2× Platinum; CAN: Platinum |
| Conflicting Emotions | Released: November 1983; Label: Polydor (ENZ 5); Format: LP, cassette | 3 | 13 | — | 10 | — | 137 | RIANZ: Platinum; AUS: Gold |
| See Ya 'Round | Released: 22 November 1984; Label: Mushroom (RML 52050); Format: LP, cassette | 5 | 29 | — | — | — | — | RIANZ: Platinum |

=== Live albums ===
List of albums, with selected chart positions and certifications
| Title | Album details | Peak chart positions | | Certifications |
| Title | Album details | NZ | AUS | Certifications |
|---|---|---|---|---|
| The Living Enz | Released: 1985; Label: Mushroom (RML 57005/6); Format: 2LP, 2MC; Recorded at various shows during the 1982 Time and Tide tour and the 1984 Enz with a Bang! tour | 9 | 88 | RIANZ: Gold |
| Anniversary | Released: November 1994; Label: Mushroom (D 98010); Format: CD; Recorded in New Zealand during Split Enz's Twentieth Anniversary tour in March 1993 | — | 150 | |
| Extravagenza (also issued in a cut-down version titled Greatest Hits Live) | Released: 2005; Label: Liberation Blue (BLUE120.5); Format: 2CD; Reissued and expanded version of Anniversary | — | — | |
| Live in America | Released: 2007 (Europe only); Label: The Store for Music (SFMCD044); Format: CD; Recorded during the True Colours tour in October 1980 | —N/a | —N/a | |
| Live, Alive Oh | Released: July 2017; Label: Liberation Music (LMCD0326); Format: 2CD; Recorded in New Zealand during Split Enz's Twentieth Anniversary tour in March 1993 & NZ Farewell Tour Vector Arena 2008 | — | 91 | |

=== Compilation albums ===
List of albums, with selected chart positions and certifications
| Title | Album details | Peak chart positions | | Certifications |
| Title | Album details | NZ | AUS | Certifications |
|---|---|---|---|---|
| The Beginning of the Enz | Released: November 1979; Label: Mushroom (L 37132); Format: LP; Compiles singles and demos recorded in 1973–1974 | 35 | — | |
| Beginning of the Enz | Released: December 1980 (UK only); Label: Chrysalis (CHR 1329); Format: LP; Compiles songs from Second Thoughts and Dizrythmia | —N/a | —N/a | |
| Enz of an Era | Released: November 1982; Label: Mushroom (RML 52027); Format: LP | 1 | 8 | RIANZ: Platinum; AUS: Platinum |
| The Split Enz Collection 1973-1984 | Released: 1986 (Australia only); Label: Concept (CC 0050); Format: 2LP | —N/a | 41 | |
| History Never Repeats – The Best of Split Enz | Released: 1987 (US), 1989 (New Zealand & Australia); Label: A&M (SP-3289) Mushroom (L 30222); Format: CD | 9 | 62 | RIANZ: 5× Platinum; ARIA: Gold |
| Oddz and Enz | Released: 1992 (exclusive to the box set Split Enz 1972–1979); Label: Mushroom; Singles, rarities, demos and live recordings 1975–1979 | — | — | |
| Rear Enz | Released: 1992 (exclusive to the box set Split Enz 1980–1984); Label: Mushroom; Format: CD; Singles, rarities and demos 1980–1984 | — | — | |
| The Best of Split Enz | Released: 1993 (UK & US); Label: Chrysalis (CDP 528409); Format: CD | —N/a | —N/a | |
| Spellbound | Released: May 1997; Label: Mushroom (MUSH33015.2); Format: CD | 17 | 5 | RIANZ: 2× Platinum; ARIA: Platinum |
| History Never Repeats – The Best of Split Enz – 30th Anniversary Edition | Released: 2002; Label: Mushroom (33619-2); Format: CD; Expanded and remastered edition of earlier release of the same name | — | 56 | ARIA: Gold |
| Rootin Tootin Luton Tapes | Released: 10 November 2007; Label: Warner Music Australia (5144241092); Format: 2CD; Compiles demos recorded in Luton in 1978 | — | — | |

=== Box sets ===
List of box sets, with selected details
| Title | Details |
|---|---|
| Split Enz 1972–1979 | Released: 1992; Label: Mushroom (D80940); Details: 6×CD (Mental Notes, Second Thoughts, Dizrythmia, Frenzy, The Beginning of the Enz and exclusive Oddz and Enz) |
| Split Enz 1980–1984 | Released: 1992; Label: Mushroom (D80946); Details: 6×CD (True Colours, Corroboree, Time and Tide, Conflicting Emotions, See Ya 'Round and exclusive Rear Enz) |
| Enz to Enz - The Ultimate Split Enz Box Set | Released: 2007; Label: Mushroom, Warner Music (5144255272); Details: 11×CD (Mental Notes, Second Thoughts, Dizrythmia, Frenzy, The Beginning of the Enz, True Colours, Corroboree, Time and Tide, Conflicting Emotions, See Ya 'Round and Rootin Tootin Luton Tapes, the last of which was initially exclusive to this box set) |
| ENZyclopedia Volumes 1 & 2 | Released: 14 November 2025; Label: Warner (CRC1899); Details: 5×CD (Mental Notes, Second Thoughts (2025 Eddie Rayner Remix), Second Thoughts, The Beginning of the Enz (2025 Eddie Rayner Remix) and Wide Angle Enz), 3×LP (Mental Notes, Second Thoughts (2025 Eddie Rayner Remix) and The Beginning of the Enz (2025 Eddie Rayner Remix)), Blu-ray |

=== Video albums ===
List of video albums, with selected details and certifications
| Title | Details | Certification |
|---|---|---|
| Live in Concert | Released: 1980; Label: Mushroom; Details: Recorded live at HSV7 Studios, Melbourne, Australia, January 7, 1980. | |
| Video LP | Released: 1982; Label: Sony/MTV Music Television; Details: Recorded live at Hamilton Place, Hamilton, Ontario, Canada, June 1982. | |
| History Never Repeats – The Best of Split Enz | Released: 1987 (US), 1989 (New Zealand & Australia); Label: Mushroom | |
| Split Enz 1972–1992 | Released: 1992; Label: Mushroom | |
| Split Enz | Released: 2002; Label: Festival Mushroom | |
| One Out of the Bag | Released: 2007; Label: Warner Music Entertainment; Details: Recorded live at Rod Laver Arena, Melbourne, Australia, June 2006. | ARIA: Gold |

=== Tribute albums ===
List of tribute albums, with selected chart positions and certifications
| Title | Album details | Peak chart positions | | Certifications |
| Title | Album details | NZ | AUS | Certifications |
|---|---|---|---|---|
| ENZSO (by Enzso) | Released: 5 November 1996; Label: Epic (483870.2); Notes: A collection of Split Enz songs as performed by New Zealand artists and the New Zealand Symphony Orchestra (NZSO). | 2 | 4 | RIANZ: Platinum; ARIA: Platinum |
| ENZSO 2 (by Enzso) | Released: 1999; Label: Epic (492852.2); Notes: A second collection of Split Enz songs with the New Zealand Symphony Orchestra. | 25 | — | |
| She Will Have Her Way | Released: 26 September 2005; Label: EMI (09463404952 0); Format: CD; A collection of songs written by Neil and Tim Finn, performed by Australian and New Zealand female artists | 4 | 3 | RIANZ: Platinum; ARIA: 2× Platinum; The album has sold over 350,000 copies |
| He Will Have His Way | Released: 12 November 2010; Label: EMI (9471022); Format: CD; A collection of songs written by Neil and Tim Finn, performed by Australian and New Zealand male artists. | — | 5 | ARIA: Gold |
| They Will Have Their Way | Released: 28 October 2011; Label: EMI (7305842); Format: CD; A compilation of She and He with additional tracks | — | 31 | |
| True Colours, New Colours: The Songs of Split Enz | Released: 12 February 2021; Label: Warner (5419709451); Format: LP; A compilation of the songs of True Colours, reimagined and recorded by Australian and New Zealand artists. | 39 | — | |
| Shades and Echoes (by Forenzics) | Released: 5 February 2022; Label: Warner (5419711266); Format: CD, LP; Notes: Debut album of a new project from Tim Finn & Eddie Rayner, reimagining old songs. | — | — | |

== Singles ==
Where available, chart positions are given for each country of release.
A mark of " — " indicates the single was released in that country, but did not chart. Cells in dark grey indicate that the single was not released in that country.

List of singles, with selected peak chart positions
| Title | Year | Chart positions | | | | | | Album |
| Title | Year | NZ | AUS | CAN | NL | UK | US | Album |
|---|---|---|---|---|---|---|---|---|
| "For You" (released as Split Ends) | 1973 | — | | | | | | Non-album releases (all later included on The Beginning of the Enz) |
| "Sweet Talkin' Spoon Song" (released as Split Ends) | 1973 | — | | | | | | Non-album releases (all later included on The Beginning of the Enz) |
| "No Bother to Me" | 1975 | — | | | | | | Non-album releases (all later included on The Beginning of the Enz) |
| "Maybe" | 1975 | — | — | | | | | Mental Notes |
| "Late Last Night" | 1976 | — | 93 | | — | | | Non-album release (different version on Second Thoughts) |
| "Matinee Idyll" | 1976 | | — | | | | | Second Thoughts |
| "Another Great Divide" | 1977 | — | — | — | — | — | — | Non-album release |
| "My Mistake" | 1977 | 21 | 15 | — | — | — | — | Dizrythmia |
| "Bold as Brass" | 1977 | — | — | — | — | — | — | Dizrythmia |
| "I See Red" | 1978 | 43 | 15 | — | — | — | — | Frenzy |
| "Give It a Whirl" | 1979 | — | — | | | | | Frenzy |
| "Things" | 1979 | — | — | | | | | Non-album release |
| "I Got You" | 1980 | 1 | 1 | 5 | — | 12 | 53 | True Colours |
| "I Hope I Never" | 1980 | 33 | 18 | — | 30 | — | — | True Colours |
| "Nobody Takes Me Seriously" | 1980 | | | | | — | — | True Colours |
| "What's the Matter with You" | 1980 | | | — | | | | True Colours |
| "Poor Boy" | 1980 | | | | | — | — | True Colours |
| "One Step Ahead" | 1980 | 6 | 5 | 17 | | — | 104 | Waiata |
| "History Never Repeats" | 1981 | 5 | 4 | — | — | 63 | — | Waiata |
| "I Don't Wanna Dance" | 1981 | — | 65 | — | | — | — | Waiata |
| "Hard Act to Follow" | 1981 | | | — | — | | | Waiata |
| "Iris" | 1981 | | | | | | — | Waiata |
| "Dirty Creature" | 1982 | 3 | 6 | — | — | — | — | Time and Tide |
| "Six Months in a Leaky Boat" | 1982 | 7 | 2 | 7 | — | 83 | 104 | Time and Tide |
| "Never Ceases to Amaze Me" | 1982 | | 50 | | | | | Time and Tide |
| "Hello Sandy Allen" | 1982 | — | | | | | | Time and Tide |
| "Next Exit" | 1983 | | 47 | | | | | Non-album release |
| "Strait Old Line" | 1983 | 15 | 42 | — | — | — | — | Conflicting Emotions |
| "Message to My Girl" | 1984 | 28 | 12 | — | 13 | — | — | Conflicting Emotions |
| "I Wake Up Every Night" | 1984 | | — | | | | | Conflicting Emotions |
| "I Walk Away" | 1984 | 13 | 45 | | | | | See Ya 'Round |
| "One Mouth Is Fed" | 1984 | — | — | | | | | See Ya 'Round |
| "I See Red" (re-release) | 1989 | 27 | 75 | | | | | History Never Repeats – The Best of Split Enz |

== See also ==
- Crowded House discography
