= One Out of the Bag =

Live album

One Out Of The Bag is a DVD/CD live release by New Zealand Rock music band Split Enz. It was recorded during their 2006 tour of Australia. This is also the first Split Enz release since Waiata/Corroboree to feature drummer Malcolm Green, who was sacked shortly before Waiata/Corroboree's release. Green shares drum duties with percussionist Noel Crombie.

== Track listing ==
(Songs written by Tim Finn unless noted)

DVD

1. Shark Attack
2. Poor Boy
3. One Step Ahead (Neil Finn)
4. Nobody Takes Me Seriously
5. Double Happy (Eddie Rayner)
6. Message to My Girl (Neil Finn)
7. Dirty Creature (Tim Finn, Neil Finn, Nigel Griggs)
8. Stuff And Nonsense
9. Matinee Idyll(129) (Tim Finn, Phil Judd)
10. Strait Old Line (Neil Finn)
11. Pioneer (Eddie Rayner)
12. Six Months In A Leaky Boat (Tim Finn, Split Enz)
13. I Got You (Neil Finn)
14. What's The Matter With You (Neil Finn)
15. I See Red

First Encore

16. I Hope I Never
17. Bold As Brass (Tim Finn, Robert Gillies)
18. My Mistake (Tim Finn, Eddie Rayner)

Second Encore

19. Take A Walk (Neil Finn)
20. Charlie
21. History Never Repeats (Neil Finn)

CD

1. "Shark Attack" – 3:34
2. "Poor Boy" – 3:46
3. "One Step Ahead" – 2:53
4. "Give It a Whirl" (Neil Finn, Tim Finn) – 3:06
5. "Nobody Takes Me Seriously" – 3:37
6. "Double Happy" – 4:26
7. "Message to My Girl" – 6:10
8. "Dirty Creature" – 5:35
9. "Stuff and Nonsense" – 4:30
10. "Strait Old Line" – 4:42
11. "Pioneer" – 2:03
12. "Six Months in a Leaky Boat" – 4:37
13. "I Got You" – 3:49
14. "What's the Matter with You" – 3:33
15. "I See Red" – 4:37
16. "I Hope I Never" – 4:55
17. "Take a Walk" – 3:38
18. "History Never Repeats" – 3:56

== Musicians ==
- Tim Finn - lead vocals, piano, acoustic guitar
- Neil Finn - lead vocals, electric guitar, acoustic guitar, piano, mandolin
- Eddie Rayner - keyboards, piano, backing vocals
- Nigel Griggs - bass guitar, backing vocals
- Noel Crombie - percussion, drums on "Message To My Girl", "Dirty Creature:, "Strait Old Line", "Six Months in a Leaky Boat" and "Take a Walk", backing vocals, guitar freak out on "My Mistake"
- Malcolm Green - drums (percussion only on "Message to My Girl", "Dirty Creature:, "Strait Old Line", "Six Months in a Leaky Boat" and "Take a Walk"), backing vocals

== Certifications ==
Region	Certification	Certified units/sales
Australia (ARIA)	Gold	7,500^{^}
^{^} Shipments figures based on certification alone.
