= Spellbound (Split Enz album) =

Compilation album by Split Enz
- Released: June 1997
- Recorded: 1973–1993
- Genre: Rock, art rock, progressive rock
- Length: 136:07
- Label: Festival Mushroom Records
- Producer: Split Enz, Dave Russell, Phil Manzanera, Geoff Emerick, Mallory Earl, David Tickle, Hugh Padgham, Jim Barton

Split Enz chronology
Anniversary (1994)	Spellbound (1997)	Stranger Than Fiction: The Gold Collection (1997)

Spellbound, (subtitled The Very Best Of Split Enz), is a 1997 compilation album by New Zealand rock band Split Enz. Spellbound features 39 tracks, including hit singles, album tracks, live tracks, and rarities, all selected by members of the band.

Similar to the band's 1980 album True Colours, Spellbound was released with different colour combinations for the cover: blue & yellow, red & green, purple & orange, and black & cream (the last one being the only combo available for the cassette version). The 1999 New Zealand reissue featured a special black & silver cover.

== Track listing ==
CD 1

1. "Dirty Creature" (Tim Finn/Nigel Griggs/Neil Finn) 4:03
2. "Strait Old Line" (Neil Finn) 4:00
3. "I See Red" (Tim Finn) 3:14
4. "I Got You" (Neil Finn) 3:30
5. "Late Last Night" (Phil Judd) 4:03
6. "One Step Ahead" (Neil Finn) 2:53
7. "I Hope I Never" (Tim Finn) 4:32
8. "Voices" (Neil Finn) 3:23
9. "Pioneer" (Eddie Rayner) 1:31
10. "Six Months in a Leaky Boat" (Tim Finn/Split Enz) 4:21
11. "Message to My Girl" (Neil Finn) 4:03
12. "Take A Walk" (Neil Finn) 3:34
13. "Nobody Takes Me Seriously" (Tim Finn) 3:27
14. "What's the Matter with You" (Neil Finn) 3:08
15. "Poor Boy" (Tim Finn) 3:25
16. "Shark Attack" (Tim Finn) 2:59
17. "Charlie" [live] (Tim Finn) 5:47 (Taken from the 1993 live album "Anniversary")
18. "Time For A Change" [live] (Phil Judd) 3:31 (Taken from the 1993 live album "Anniversary")
19. "I Walk Away (Neil Finn) 3:47

CD 2

1. "History Never Repeats" (Neil Finn) 2:59
2. "Bold as Brass" (Tim Finn/Robert Gillies) 3:29
3. "My Mistake" (Tim Finn/Eddie Rayner) 3:01
4. "Give It A Whirl" (Tim Finn/Neil Finn) 2:51
5. "Sugar And Spice" (Phil Judd) 3:52
6. "Without A Doubt" (Tim Finn) 5:57
7. "Haul Away" (Tim Finn) 2:28
8. "Stuff And Nonsense" [1997 remix] (Tim Finn) 4:21
9. "The Devil You Know" (Neil Finn) 3:35
10. "Maybe" (Phil Judd/Tim Finn) 2:54
11. "Matinee Idyll" (1973 demo. Taken from the 1979 album "The Beginning of the Enz") (Phil Judd/Tim Finn) 2:46
12. "Titus" (Taken from the 1976 album "Second Thoughts") (Phil Judd) 3:14
13. "Another Great Divide" (Phil Judd/Tim Finn/Eddie Rayner/Robert Gillies) 3:38
14. "Semi-Detached" [Luton version] (Tim Finn) 5:02
15. "Hermit McDermitt" [Luton version] (Tim Finn) 4:21
16. "Doctor Love" (Neil Finn) 4:14
17. "Make Sense Of It" (Noel Crombie/Tim Finn/Neil Finn/Nigel Griggs/Eddie Rayner) 3:32
18. "Sweet Dreams" (Phil Judd) 5:04
19. "Years Go By" (Neil Finn/Eddie Rayner) 4:15
20. "Mental Notes" (Phil Judd) 0:43

== 1999 New Zealand-only reissue ==
This now-deleted reissue resequenced the track listing slightly, roughly redesignating CD 1 as hits and CD 2 as album tracks and rarities.

CD 1

1. "Dirty Creature" (Tim Finn/Nigel Griggs/Neil Finn) 4:03
2. "History Never Repeats" (Neil Finn) 2:59
3. "I See Red" (Tim Finn) 3:14
4. "My Mistake" (Tim Finn/Eddie Rayner) 3:01
5. "I Got You" (Neil Finn) 3:30
6. "Shark Attack" (Tim Finn) 2:59
7. "Poor Boy" (Tim Finn) 3:25
8. "I Hope I Never" (Tim Finn) 4:32
9. "Voices" (Neil Finn) 3:23
10. "Pioneer" (Eddie Rayner) 1:31
11. "Six Months in a Leaky Boat" (Tim Finn/Split Enz) 4:21
12. "Message to My Girl" (Neil Finn) 4:03
13. "Strait Old Line" (Neil Finn) 4:00
14. "Bold as Brass" (Tim Finn/Robert Gillies) 3:29
15. "One Step Ahead" (Neil Finn) 2:53
16. "Make Sense Of It" (Noel Crombie/Tim Finn/Neil Finn/Nigel Griggs/Eddie Rayner) 3:32
17. "I Walk Away (Neil Finn) 3:47
18. "Charlie" [live] (Tim Finn) 5:47 (Taken from the 1993 live album "Anniversary")
19. "Time For A Change" [live] (Phil Judd) 3:31 (Taken from the 1993 live album "Anniversary")

CD 2

1. "Late Last Night" (Phil Judd) 4:03
2. "Give It A Whirl" (Tim Finn/Neil Finn) 2:51
3. "Sugar And Spice" (Phil Judd) 3:52
4. "Nobody Takes Me Seriously" (Tim Finn) 3:27
5. "What's The Matter With You" (Neil Finn) 3:08
6. "Stuff And Nonsense" [1997 remix] (Tim Finn)
7. "Take A Walk" (Neil Finn) 3:34
8. "Haul Away" (Tim Finn) 2:28
9. "Without A Doubt" (Tim Finn) 5:57
10. "The Devil You Know" (Neil Finn) 3:35
11. "Maybe" (Phil Judd/Tim Finn) 2:54
12. "Matinee Idyll" (1973 demo. Taken from the 1979 album "The Beginning of the Enz") (Phil Judd/Tim Finn) 2:46
13. "Titus" (Taken from the 1976 album "Second Thoughts") (Phil Judd) 3:14
14. "Another Great Divide" (Phil Judd/Tim Finn/Eddie Rayner/Robert Gillies) 3:38
15. "Semi-Detached" [Luton version] (Tim Finn) 5:02
16. "Hermit McDermitt" [Luton version] (Tim Finn) 4:21
17. "Doctor Love" (Neil Finn) 4:14
18. "Years Go By" (Neil Finn/Eddie Rayner) 4:15
19. "Sweet Dreams" (Phil Judd) 5:04
20. "Mental Notes" (Phil Judd) 0:43

== 1997 New Zealand limited edition ==
With limited edition, individually numbered black & silver cardboard slipcase.

== 2006 Australian tour edition ==
With limited edition, individually numbered black & silver cardboard slipcase; similar to 1997 NZ limited edition.

== 2008 New Zealand tour edition ==
With limited edition, individually numbered black & silver cardboard slipcase; similar to 1997 NZ limited edition.

== Charts ==
Chart (1997)	Peak position
New Zealand Albums (RMNZ)	17

Chart (2006)	Peak position
Australian Albums (ARIA)	5

== Certifications ==
Region	Certification	Certified units/sales
Australia (ARIA)	Platinum	70,000^{^}
New Zealand (RMNZ)	2× Platinum	30,000^{^}
^{^} Shipments figures based on certification alone.
