= Extravagenza =

Live album by Split Enz
- Released: 8 August 2005 (Australia); 14 November 2005 (New Zealand)
- Recorded: March 1993
- Genre: rock music
- Length: 1:35:05
- Label: Liberation Blue
- Producer: Eddie Rayner & Nigel Griggs

Split Enz chronology
Spellbound (1997)	Extravagenza (2005)	Rootin Tootin Luton Tapes (2007)

Professional ratings
Review scores
Source	Rating
Allmusic	3.5/5 stars

Extravagenza is a live album by New Zealand rock band Split Enz. Comprising recordings from the Palmerston North, New Plymouth and Auckland shows of the band's 1993 20th Anniversary Tour of New Zealand, the album is an expanded, remixed and remastered version of their 1994 live album Anniversary. The canned audience loop used on Anniversary was removed, giving the recordings a more natural feel.

== Track listing ==
CD 1

1. "Shark Attack" (Tim Finn) – 3:13
2. "Poor Boy" (Tim Finn) – 3:45
3. "Message to My Girl" (Neil Finn) – 4:53
4. "Dirty Creature" (Tim Finn, Nigel Griggs, Neil Finn) – 5:41
5. "Strait Old Line"/"The Woman Who Loves You" (Neil Finn -- Phil Judd, Tim Finn) – 7:54
6. "Haul Away"/"Brandy"/"I Saw Her Standing There"/"Irish Heartbeat" (Tim Finn—Scott English, Richard Kerr -- John Lennon, Paul McCartney -- Van Morrison) – 5:01
7. "I Got You" (Neil Finn) – 4:20
8. "Going Down to the Woolshed"/"Best Friend" (Tim Finn -- Tim Finn, Neil Finn) – 3:16
9. "One Step Ahead" (Neil Finn) – 3:05
10. "Split Ends" (Phil Judd, Tim Finn) – 2:15
11. "Time for a Change" (Phil Judd) – 3:31

CD 2

1. "True Colours (Let's Rock)" (Phil Judd) – 0:43
2. "I See Red" (Tim Finn) – 4:19
3. "Bold as Brass" (Tim Finn, Robert Gillies) – 4:35
4. "Give It a Whirl" (Tim Finn, Neil Finn) – 3:00
5. "Pioneer" (Eddie Rayner) – 1:54
6. "Six Months in a Leaky Boat" (Tim Finn, Split Enz) – 5:15
7. "Years Go By" (Neil Finn, Eddie Rayner) – 4:18
8. "Without a Doubt" (Tim Finn) – 5:36
9. "Hermit McDermitt" (Tim Finn) – 5:33
10. "What's the Matter with You" (Neil Finn) – 3:30
11. "Charlie" (Tim Finn) – 5:47
12. "History Never Repeats" (Neil Finn) – 3:41

== Personnel ==
- Tim Finn – vocals & keyboards
- Neil Finn – vocals & guitar
- Noel Crombie – percussion
- Eddie Rayner – keyboards
- Paul Hester – drums
- Nigel Griggs – bass

== Production ==
- Recorded live during the 20th Anniversary Tour of New Zealand, March 1993
- Producer: Eddie Rayner
- Recording Engineer: Angus Davidson
- Mixing Engineer: Adrian Stuckey
- Recording Assistant: Greg Peacock
- Mixed & Mastered at Bignote Studios, Burleigh Heads, Queensland, Australia by Eddie Rayner & Adrian Stuckey
