= Rootin Tootin Luton Tapes =

Compilation album by Split Enz

Compilation album by Split Enz
- Released: 10 November 2007 (Australia); 26 November 2007 (New Zealand)
- Recorded: July 1978
- Genre: Rock
- Length: 102:53
- Label: Rhino Records
- Producer: Dave Cook, Split Enz

Split Enz chronology
Live in America (2006)	Rootin Tootin Luton Tapes (2007)	Live, Alive Oh (2017)

The Rootin Tootin Luton Tapes is a collection of demos made by New Zealand band Split Enz in 1978. During their 2006 tour of Australia it was announced that these recordings would finally be released as an official album after lengthy pressure from the fan club Frenz of the Enz.

In 1978 Split Enz fired their record company, their manager, and co-founder Phil Judd had left for the final time. The band was in a slump, and the opportunity arose for them to record in a small studio in Luton. It was a cramped space with percussionist Noel Crombie having to set up his kit in the studio's toilet and Eddie Rayner in a position where he was almost constantly hitting Tim Finn in the head with his elbow. In spite of this, the band claims that this was a very passionate recording session, and was the beginning of a new era.

Some songs were re-recorded for the album Frenzy, but the band considered the original recordings to be far superior. This was partly due to the engineering and mixing on that album by producer Mallory Earl resulting in tracks described by Noel Crombie as "woolly and average", and also from subdued performances by the band.

In 2007, Split Enz keyboardist Eddie Rayner remixed the available tapes; a limited edition 2-CD set was made available by the Frenz Of The Enz fan club to its members, while the commercial release is a single CD.

== 2 CD version ==
CD 1

1. "Miss Haps" (Tim Finn, Eddie Rayner) - 4:08
2. "Home Comforts" (Tim Finn) - 4:13
3. "Animal Lover" (Eddie Rayner) - 3:16
4. "Carried Away" (Neil Finn) - 4:37
5. "Semi-Detached" # (Tim Finn) - 5:03
6. "Holy Smoke" (Neil Finn) - 3:21
7. "Message Boy" (Tim Finn) - 3:47
8. "Hypnotised" (Tim Finn) - 3:41
9. "Late In Rome" (aka "Serge") (Neil Finn) - 3:25
10. "Straight Talk" (Tim Finn, Rob Gillies) - 3:23
11. "Hollow Victory" (Tim Finn) - 3:23
12. "Evelyn" (Neil Finn) - 3:16
13. "Best Friend" (Tim Finn, Neil Finn) - 3:04
14. "Creature Comforts" (Tim Finn, Nigel Griggs) - 2:52
15. "Remember When" (Tim Finn) - 3:56

CD 2

1. "Hermit McDermitt" (Tim Finn) - 5:02
2. "Betty" (Tim Finn) - 6:13
3. "I See Red" (Tim Finn) - 3:15
4. "Mind Over Matter" (Tim Finn, Neil Finn) - 3:09
5. "Next Exit" (Tim Finn) - 3:54
6. "She Got Body She Got Soul" (Tim Finn) - 2:57
7. "So This Is Love" * # (Phil Judd) - 4:14
8. "Abu Dhabi" # (Tim Finn, Eddie Rayner) - 4:53
9. "Famous People" # (Tim Finn) - 4:02
10. "I'm So Up" * # (Phil Judd) - 2:58
11. "Marooned" # (Tim Finn, Eddie Rayner) - 2:27
12. "Livin' It Up" # (Nigel Griggs) - 1:17
13. "Frenzy" # (Tim Finn, Eddie Rayner) - 3:07

== Single CD version ==
Features CD 1 only.

== Production ==
- Recorded at Quest Studios, Luton, Bedfordshire, England, July 1978 (except those marked * - recorded on the Dave Lee Travis Show, BBC Studios, London, January 1978)
- Produced by Dave Cook & Split Enz
- Engineered & mixed by Dave Cook
- Remixed & remastered by Eddie Rayner & Adrian Stuckey at Bignote Studios, Burleigh Heads, Queensland, Australia, 2006/07 (except those marked # - original 1978 mixes)

== Original release of Rootin Tootin Luton tracks ==
Though largely unreleased prior the 2007 CD, ten songs from The Rootin' Tootin Luton Tapes were released in various artist albums or on the B-sides of singles.

"Hermit McDermitt"

- B-side of "I See Red" (New Zealand/Australia), 1978
- Frenzy album (A&M version), 1982
- Spellbound album, 1997

"Message Boy"

- B-side of "I See Red" (New Zealand/Australia), 1978

"Semi-Detached"

- B-side of "Things", 1979
- Frenzy album (A&M version), 1982
- Spellbound album, 1997
- Frenzy album remix/remaster, 2006

"Hypnotised"

- B-side of "I Hope I Never" (Australia), 1980

"Carried Away"

- B-side of "I Hope I Never" (Australia), 1980
- Frenzy album (A&M version), 1982
- Frenzy album remix/remaster, 2006

"Holy Smoke"

- B-side of "History Never Repeats" (New Zealand/Australia), 1981
- Frenzy album (A&M version), 1982

"Next Exit"

- More Hits & Myths! NZ-only various artist album, 1981

"Livin' It Up"

- B-side of "I See Red" (Canada), 1982
- Frenzy album (A&M version), 1982

"Mind Over Matter"

- Frenzy album (A&M version), 1982

"Evelyn"

- I Like It Rare 4 Frenz Of The Enz fan club-only CD, 2007

== Lost tracks ==
In a Frenz of the Enz newsletter, Eddie Rayner was interviewed regarding the release of the Luton tapes. He has confirmed that one tape containing approximately five songs is missing. One track that he assumes is on it is called "Sensational" (as this track is not on any of the other tapes he has).

== Personnel ==
- Tim Finn - vocals, piano
- Neil Finn - guitar, piano, vocals
- Nigel Griggs - bass
- Noel Crombie - percussion
- Malcolm Green - drums
- Eddie Rayner - keyboards
- Phil Judd - guitar, vocals on "So This is Love" and "I'm So Up"
