= Frenzy (Split Enz album) =

Studio album by Split Enz
- Released: 19 February 1979
- Recorded: July, November–December 1978
- Studios: Startling Studios (England); The Manor (Shipton-on-Cherwell, England)
- Genre: New wave
- Length: 44:55 (1979 release); 47:04 (1981 release); 58:33 (2006 release)
- Labels: Mushroom (AUS/NZ); A&M (overseas)
- Producers: Mallory Earl; David Tickle; Split Enz

Split Enz chronology
Dizrythmia (1977)	Frenzy (1979)	The Beginning of the Enz (1979)

Singles from Frenzy
- 1. "I See Red" Released: December 1978

Professional ratings
Review scores
Source	Rating
AllMusic	4/5 stars

Frenzy is the fourth studio album by the New Zealand new wave band Split Enz. Frenzy ventured further beyond the band's art rock roots to more of a pop sound.

The album is notable for featuring Neil Finn's first lead vocals, on the tracks "Give It a Whirl" and "Master Plan".

== Details ==
The album was primarily recorded at The Manor Studios in England between November and December in 1978; however, the song "I See Red" had already been recorded at Startling Studios (also in England) in July 1978.

There was a long delay between the writing of the songs and the recording. Tim Finn said, "We'd been waiting nearly a year to do it so we'd done all the demos, rehearsed it and written new songs. We'd been waiting too long. There's so much material. The album has twelve songs, but by the time we'd recorded it we'd written fifty more."

The song "Abu Dhabi" created controversy due to the use of phrases such as "greedy westerners" and "oil barons", considered to be racist by some. As a result, the song's vocals were mixed softly, the offensive lyrics were not printed anywhere on the album and with the exception of a few shouts of 'Abu Dhabi' left in, completely mixed out of the 2006 remix of the track.

The cover artwork was done by the band's then lighting director, Raewyn Turner. Tim Finn said, "We deliberately wanted something of us without the costumes. There's no need to promote our image anymore – it's our music that needs to be promoted".

Dissatisfaction with the original mix of the album led to Eddie Rayner remixing the album in 1981 for the North American and European releases. Side one comprised songs from the original release, while side two was a mix of songs recorded on the Rootin Tootin Luton Tapes from 1978. The sound of the original album apparently suffered from either bad tape stock used for the recording of the album, or misalignment of the tape machines used to record it – which limited what Rayner had to work with in the aforementioned 1981 remix. Release of the Rootin Tootin Luton Tapes finally eventuated in 2007 after many delays.

Subsequent developments in recording technology led to the remix of album track "Stuff and Nonsense" for the 1997 compilation Spellbound, and an entire remix of the album by Eddie Rayner released in 2006. Although the remix was available for a short while after its release in 2006, it is now a rarity – with fans having to pay large sums of money to obtain it. Mushroom Records did not make the remixed album available in digital format.

The 1981 edition was made available digitally in November 2026.

== Reception ==
Reviewed in Roadrunner at the time of release, it was described as, "a very mature and subtle piece of vinyl ... although not as immediately stunning as the stark Mental Notes or as smoothly polished as the sleek Second Thoughts. This is a creative work of appreciable depth." Particularly praised were "I See Red", "Give It A Whirl" and "Hermit McDermitt" (for its "unique demented hillbilly sound").

== Track listings ==
All tracks are written by Tim Finn except where noted.

=== 1979 release ===
"I See Red" was not included on the first 10,000 copies of this album, having not been a part of the same sessions. It was added subsequently on 1 March 1979.

Side one
No.	Title	Writer(s)	Length
1.	"I See Red"		3:15
2.	"Give It a Whirl"	T. Finn; Neil Finn	3:04
3.	"Master Plan"		3:07
4.	"Famous People"		3:02
5.	"Hermit McDermitt"		4:03
6.	"Stuff and Nonsense"		4:27
7.	"Marooned"	Eddie Rayner	2:32
Total length:			23:30

Side two
No.	Title	Writer(s)	Length
8.	"Frenzy"	T. Finn; Rayner	2:30
9.	"The Roughest Toughest Game in the World"		3:44
10.	"She Got Body, She Got Soul"		2:58
11.	"Betty"		4:45
12.	"Abu Dhabi"	T. Finn; Rayner	4:31
13.	"Mind Over Matter"	T. Finn; N. Finn	2:57
Total length:			21:25 44:55

=== 1981 release ===
Some bootleg versions of the A&M 1981 Frenzy also include B-sides "Message Boy", "Hypnotized" and rare "Next Exit" – all recorded during the Luton sessions. "Stuff & Nonsense" is preceded by a brief introduction by Tim Finn, who dedicates the song to the New Zealand All Blacks rugby team. The original version of "Next Exit" from the Luton tapes was released on the More Hits and Myths compilation.

Side one
No.	Title	Writer(s)	Length
1.	"I See Red"		3:15
2.	"Give It a Whirl"	T. Finn; N. Finn	2:52
3.	"Master Plan"		3:00
4.	"Betty"		4:42
5.	"Frenzy"		2:15
6.	"Stuff and Nonsense"		4:30
7.	"Marooned"	Rayner	2:15
Total length:			22:49

Side two
No.	Title	Writer(s)	Length
8.	"Hermit McDermitt" (Luton version)		4:19
9.	"Holy Smoke"	N. Finn	3:15
10.	"Semi-Detached"		5:05
11.	"Carried Away"	N. Finn	4:34
12.	"She Got Body"		2:55
13.	"Mind Over Matter" (Luton version)	T. Finn; N. Finn	2:52
14.	"Livin' It Up"	Nigel Griggs	1:15
Total length:			24:15 47:04

=== 2006 release ===
All tracks were remixed in 2005–2006 by Eddie Rayner for the digital and CD release.

No.	Title	Writer(s)	Length
1.	"Give It a Whirl"	T. Finn; N. Finn	3:04
2.	"I See Red"		3:15
3.	"Famous People"		3:02
4.	"Hermit McDermitt"		4:03
5.	"Stuff and Nonsense"		4:28
6.	"Mind Over Matter"	T. Finn; N. Finn	2:57
7.	"Marooned"	Rayner	2:32
8.	"Master Plan"		3:07
9.	"She Got Body, She Got Soul"		2:58
10.	"The Roughest Toughest Game in the World"		3:44
11.	"Abu Dhabi" (instrumental)	T. Finn; Rayner	5:23
12.	"Betty"		4:45
13.	"Frenzy"	T. Finn; Rayner	2:30
14.	"Semi-Detached"		5:05
15.	"Carried Away"	N. Finn	4:34
16.	"Horse to Water" (Frenzy session outtake)		3:06
Total length:			58:33

- The track listing on the CD booklet and back cover is incorrect on most editions.
- Tracks 14-16 are omitted on the digital release.

== Personnel ==
Personnel as listed in the album's liner notes are:

=== Split Enz ===
- Tim Finn – vocals, acoustic guitar, piano
- Neil Finn – vocals, guitar
- Noel Crombie – percussion, backing vocals
- Eddie Rayner – keyboards, backing vocals, piano
- Malcolm Green – drums, backing vocals
- Nigel Griggs – bass guitar, backing vocals

=== Production ===
- Mallory Earl — production, engineering
- Hugh Padgham, Marlis Duncklau — engineering
- Raewyn Turner — cover artwork

== Charts ==
Chart (1979)	Peak position
Australia (Kent Music Report)	24
New Zealand Albums (RMNZ)	13
Chart (1982)	Peak position
Canada	49

== Certifications and sales ==
Region	Certification	Certified units/sales
Canada (Music Canada)	Gold	50,000^{^}
New Zealand (RMNZ)	Gold	7,500^{^}
^{^} Shipments figures based on certification alone.

== Release history ==
Country	Date
Australia	19 February 1979
New Zealand	19 February 1979
Europe	1981
North America	1981
