= I Hope I Never =

Single by Split Enz

from the album True Colours
- B-side: "Hypnotised"; "Carried Away"
- Released: May 1980
- Recorded: Armstrong, Melbourne, 1979
- Genre: Rock
- Length: 3:56
- Label: Mushroom Records
- Songwriter(s): Tim Finn
- Producer(s): David Tickle

Split Enz singles chronology
"I Got You" (1980)	"I Hope I Never" (1980)	"Nobody Takes Me Seriously" (1980)

Alternative covers
- US cover

Alternative cover
- Dutch cover

"I Hope I Never" is a 1980 song by New Zealand art rock group Split Enz. It was released in May 1980 as the second single from their album True Colours.

== Track listings ==
=== Australian release ===
Side A

1. "I Hope I Never" – 3:56 (Tim Finn)

Side B

1. "Hypnotised" (Tim Finn)
2. "Carried Away" (Neil Finn)

=== International release ===
It was released in the US and in the Netherlands with the same track listing, but different artwork.

1. "I Hope I Never" – 3:56 (Tim Finn)
2. "The Choral Sea" – 4:38 (Eddie Rayner)

== Personnel ==
- Tim Finn – vocals, piano
- Noel Crombie – vocals, percussion
- Eddie Rayner – vocals, keyboards
- Malcolm Green – vocals, drums
- Nigel Griggs – vocals, bass

== Charts ==
Chart (1980)	Peak position
Australia (Kent Music Report)	18
Netherlands (Dutch Top 40)	30
New Zealand (Recorded Music NZ)	33

== Cover versions ==
- Colleen Hewett from her album, Colleen (1983)
- ENZSO (1995), a collaboration between Split Enz's Eddie Rayner and the New Zealand Symphony Orchestra. The cover featured New Zealand singer Annie Crummer on vocals, changing only the lyrics to refer to herself as an "optimistic woman" rather than a man.
- Australia's Tina Arena recorded the song in 2008 with the London Studio Orchestra for her album Songs of Love & Loss 2, and similarly changed the lyrics to reflect her gender.
- Lisa Miller covered the song on the 2011 tribute album They Will Have Their Way.
- Elizabeth Maverick (Singer) aka Ghetto Rose.
