= I See Red (Split Enz song) =

Single by Split Enz

from the album Frenzy
- B-side: "Hermit McDermitt"; "Message Boy"
- Released: December 1978
- Recorded: Startling Studios, England, 1978
- Genre: New wave, punk rock, hard rock
- Length: 3:15
- Label: Mushroom Records
- Songwriter: Tim Finn
- Producer: David Tickle

Split Enz singles chronology
"Bold as Brass" (1977)	"I See Red" (1978)	"Give It A Whirl" (1979)

Alternative cover
- Cover to the 1989 re-release.

"I See Red" is a 1978 song by New Zealand art rock group Split Enz. It was released in December 1978 as the lead single from their studio album Frenzy.

"I See Red" was the second Split Enz song to achieve a top 20 chart position, peaking at #15 in Australia and #43 in the band's native New Zealand.

== Recording ==
Tim Finn said, "That's a one-off thing we did at Startling Studios which is Ringo Starr's studio - it used to be John Lennon's place. The engineer out there got to know us and liked us and gave us some free time when the studio wasn't being used." Elsewhere, he said, "We were on the bones of our arse. Somebody suggested this young guy (David Tickle) that they thought would be worth trying. It was an experiment. We ended up at Startling Studios, which was John Lennon's house when he and Yoko were doing Imagine and all that. So, it had acres of legendary pathos and meaning for us to be there."

== Music video ==
The music video for "I See Red" begins with Tim Finn angrily ripping his hair out (the first line of the lyrics indicates "When my baby's walking down the street/I see red, I see red, I see red"). Finn returns to the band and sings the rest of the song with them. All are wearing grey suits with black markings, white shirts and red ties. The studio is low lit with a white or red spotlight on different members of the band, occasionally lighting up a backdrop completely but predominantly keeping to white and red light. At the very end of the song, musically, the song silences very suddenly instead of fading out or being ended at the end of a bar, because of the tape running out during recording. In the music video, the band members disappear from the performance area at the same moment, leaving only their instruments in place.

== Track listing ==
All songs written by Tim Finn.

=== 7" vinyl ===
Side A

1. "I See Red" - 3:15

Side B

1. "Hermit McDermitt" - 3:42
2. "Message Boy" - 3:51

=== Coloured 7" vinyl reissue ===
Reissued in 1989 to coincide with the release of greatest hits album History Never Repeats - The Best Of Split Enz. Released with new artwork to match History Never Repeats. Live version recorded at Festival Hall, Melbourne, November 1984.

1. "I See Red" - 3:15
2. "I See Red" (live) - 4:15

== Personnel ==
- Tim Finn — lead vocals
- Neil Finn — guitar, backing vocals
- Noel Crombie — percussion, backing vocals
- Eddie Rayner — piano, keyboards, backing vocals
- Malcolm Green — drums, backing vocals
- Nigel Griggs — bass guitar, backing vocals

== Charts ==
=== Weekly charts ===
Chart (1979)	Peak position
Australia (Kent Music Report)	15
New Zealand (Recorded Music NZ)	43

=== Year-end charts ===
Chart (1979)	Rank
Australia (Kent Music Report)	90

== Certifications ==
Region	Certification	Certified units/sales
New Zealand (RMNZ)	Gold	15,000^{‡}
^{‡} Sales+streaming figures based on certification alone.

== Cover versions ==
According to Mike Chunn, former Split Enz member and writer of the biography Stranger Than Fiction: The Life And Times Of Split Enz, Bette Midler approached them backstage at a 1980 concert in Los Angeles and expressed her fondness for the song and discussed with the band the idea of recording her own version, though this never materialized. In 2012, the New Zealand Army Band covered the song as part of their performance for the Arrowtown 150th anniversary celebrations.

== Sources ==
- Chunn, Mike (1992). Stranger than fiction: the life and times of Split Enz. Wellington, N.Z.: GP Publications. ISBN 1-86956-050-7. OCLC 31240332.
