= Dysrhythmia =

Dysrhythmia may refer to:

- Circadian dysrhythmias, disturbances of circadian (daily) rhythms including jet lag and disturbed sleep timing
- Cardiac dysrhythmia, a medical condition causing irregular heart rate, also called arrhythmia
- Dysrhythmia (band), a progressive metal band from Brooklyn
- Dizrythmia, a 1977 album by Split Enz
