= I Got You (Split Enz song) =

Single by Split Enz

from the album True Colours
- B-side: "Double Happy"
- Released: 21 January 1980
- Recorded: November 1979
- Studio: Armstrong Studios, Melbourne
- Genre: New wave
- Length: 3:24
- Label: Mushroom Records, Melbourne
- Songwriter: Neil Finn
- Producer: David Tickle

Split Enz singles chronology
"Things" (1979)	"I Got You" (1980)	"I Hope I Never" (1980)

"I Got You" is a song by New Zealand rock band Split Enz. It was released as a single on 21 January 1980 by Mushroom Records in Australia and New Zealand, and August 1980 by A&M internationally, as the first single from their breakthrough album True Colours. Written by co-lead singer Neil Finn, who did not initially believe it to be a hit, it became the band's most commercially successful song, topping the charts in Australasia (spending eight weeks at number-one in Australia) and placing in the top 20 of the British and top 10 of the Canadian charts. By July 1980, it had become the biggest selling single in Australian history.

The song was rated #11 on the Australasian Performing Right Association's Top 100 New Zealand Songs Of All Time list.

== Background ==
"I Got You" originated from a series of songwriting sessions with his brother and co-frontman Tim, in which one brother would name a title and the other would write a song around it; Tim suggested the title "I Got You" to Neil. Speaking to the New Zealand Herald in 2001, Neil recalled: "I think Tim came up with the title. We were sitting around in Rose Bay, Sydney, writing and I remember thinking the chorus was kind of weak. But when we rehearsed it, it felt really good straight away." Tim Finn said, "There was a gig [at] the Playroom. I remember at sound check one day, we tried that song and the band played it full tilt. Because I don't do much in it other than a harmony part, I thought, 'I'll go out the front and listen just for once.' So, I did and the sound was brilliant. It just had this incredible power. It took my breath away really, how great it was."

Initially, neither Neil, nor Michael Gudinski of Mushroom Records, believed the song would become a hit, Gudinski believing none of the tracks on True Colours had hit potential. The guitar riff at the start was played by Neil. He later remarked, "That was the only [riff] I knew how to play at the time... That was me learning how to play electric guitar."

== Reception ==
The song received critical acclaim in contemporary music magazines. Reviewed in Roadrunner at the time of release, it was said the song "positively drips with appeal that only philistines could fail to appreciate," and asked readers to buy a copy as "it deserves to be a hit." Amanda Nicholls of Record Mirror, who also urged readers to buy the single, commented: "Good production with immaculate build-up and control throughout". Billboard noted the song's "record tenure" on the Australian charts and said American audiences would pick up on the song's "off-color, theme song appeal". Cashbox compared the song's "edgey [sic] vocals" to the Cars, and said it was "due for stateside recognition".

== Music video ==
The music video was designed and directed by percussionist Noel Crombie, who directed most of the band's previous videos. It features Neil Finn standing in a room singing the song with the other band members performing in a framed picture on the wall behind him. The picture animates when he sings the chorus but goes still when he sings the verses. At the end of the video he is seen in the picture with the band.

== Track listing ==
1. "I Got You" – 3:24
2. "Double Happy" – 3:15

== Personnel ==
- Neil Finn – vocals, guitar
- Tim Finn – vocals
- Noel Crombie – vocals, percussion
- Malcolm Green – drums
- Nigel Griggs – bass guitar
- Eddie Rayner – keyboards

== Charts ==
=== Weekly charts ===
Chart (1980)	Peak position
Australia (Kent Music Report)	1
Canada (CBC) (Note: 5 is the top position cited in contemporaneous secondary sources. The single reached 1 on the CHUM Chart, 5 on the CBC Singles Chart, and 10 on the RPM Top Singles Chart.)	5
Ireland (IRMA)	19
Netherlands (Dutch Top 40 Tipparade)^{(Note: The Tipparade is a "bubbling under" chart for singles which haven't made the Dutch Top 40.)}	22
New Zealand (Recorded Music NZ)	1
UK (OCC)	12
US Billboard Hot 100	53
US Cash Box Top 100	50

=== Year-end charts ===
Chart (1980)	Rank
Australia (Kent Music Report)	1
New Zealand	8
Canada (CHUM Top 100)	13
US (Joel Whitburn's Pop Annual)	299

== Certifications ==
Region	Certification	Certified units/sales
New Zealand (RMNZ)	2× Platinum	60,000^{‡}
^{‡} Sales+streaming figures based on certification alone.

== Cover versions ==
"I Got You" has been recorded by Vitamin C and The Connells. Fleetwood Mac also played the song on their 2018-19 tour, An Evening with Fleetwood Mac, where Neil Finn replaced longtime member Lindsey Buckingham. In addition to "I Got You," Finn also performed Crowded House song "Don't Dream It's Over," with Stevie Nicks providing harmonies.

New Zealand band Shihad also released their version in 2020.
