= Anniversary (Split Enz album) =

Live album by Split Enz
- Released: November 1994
- Recorded: March 1993
- Genre: Rock
- Label: Mushroom
- Producer: Eddie Rayner & Nigel Griggs

Split Enz chronology
The Best of Split Enz (1993)	Anniversary (1994)	Spellbound (1997)

Anniversary is a live album by New Zealand rock band Split Enz. Released in November 1994, it was recorded during the band's 1993 tour, which coincided with the 20th anniversary of the band's first single (released under the name Split Ends). Anniversary is the twelfth and penultimate album released by Split Enz.

Professional ratings
Review scores
Source	Rating
AllMusic	2/5 stars

== Track listing ==
1. "Shark Attack" (Tim Finn)
2. "Poor Boy" (Tim Finn)
3. "Hermit McDermitt" (Tim Finn)
4. "Years Go By" (Neil Finn/Eddie Rayner)
5. "Split Ends" (Phil Judd/Tim Finn)
6. "Message to My Girl" (Neil Finn)
7. "Best Friend" (Tim Finn/Neil Finn)
8. "What's the Matter with You" (Neil Finn)
9. "I See Red" (Tim Finn)
10. "Time for a Change" (Phil Judd)
11. "Strait Old Line" (Neil Finn)
12. "Charlie" (Tim Finn)
13. "History Never Repeats" (Neil Finn)

== Charts ==
Chart (1994)	Peak position
Australia (ARIA)	150
