= True Colours (Split Enz album) =

Studio album by Split Enz
- Released: 21 January 1980 (New Zealand and Australia); 25 June 1980 (Internationally)
- Recorded: June − November 1979
- Studio: Armstrong Studios (Melbourne)
- Genre: New wave
- Length: 37:29
- Labels: Mushroom (AUS); Polydor (NZL); A&M (International)
- Producer: David Tickle

Split Enz chronology
The Beginning of the Enz (1979)	True Colours (1980)	Beginning of the Enz (1980)

Singles from True Colours
- 1. "I Got You" Released: 21 January 1980; 2. "I Hope I Never" Released: May 1980; 3. "Nobody Takes Me Seriously" Released: 1980; 4. "What's the Matter with You" Released: 1980; 5. "Poor Boy" Released: 1980

True Colours is the fifth studio album released by New Zealand band Split Enz, and was their first major commercial success. Released on 21 January 1980 in New Zealand and Australia, and subsequently on 25 June 1980 internationally, the album featured more pronounced contributions from co-lead singer and songwriter Neil Finn than previous releases. The album's New Zealand and Australian number 1 single, "I Got You", which was also their international break-out song, is credited to him. The US release of the album featured "Shark Attack" and "I Got You" in reversed positions due to the latter's success on the single charts.

== Details ==
Tim Finn said, "We had been playing so many shows, so the band were very tight. It was like everything was starting to line up to make a really powerful record." Noel Crombie added, "We'd had a rough time up to that in England, and I think we're really just raring to go. We came back to Melbourne and recorded the album and it just felt it was a new beginning."

Tim Finn later said of recording, "David Tickle was supremely confident, almost arrogant, but he gave us something to bounce off. Half the time we didn't even like him. He wasn't some svengali who sprinkled the fairy dust. He was mostly a good engineer."

Originally, the band thought "Missing Person" to be the album's standout track, not realizing "I Got You" would become the hit. "I Hope I Never" was mixed differently for the Australian single release, with strengthened percussion. "Nobody Takes Me Seriously", "What's the Matter with You" and "Poor Boy" were released as singles in the northern hemisphere.

A synthesizer melody played in "I Wouldn't Dream of It" was first introduced in an early Split Enz recording, aptly titled "The Instrumental".

== Cover ==
The album cover was initially released in four colour combinations – yellow and blue, red and green, purple and yellow, and blue and orange – but would ultimately be given another four makeovers with releases in lime green and pink, hot purple and burnt orange, gold and platinum (to mark its sales milestones), and finally yellow, blue and red.

Crombie later said, "There was a lot of resistance initially. For some reason they thought people would get confused. It was just playing with it really. Why not? In the end there were 11 covers. The rarest one is the black and white one that got sent out to the press. There's about 100 of them, with Textas to colour your own. So, if you're really keen, you'll have 11."

When it was later released on the A&M label, imaginative shapes and patterns covered the vinyl using a technique known as "laser-etching". When light hit the record, these designs would protrude and spin about the room. The album was the first to ever use this technique, originally designed to discourage the creation of counterfeit copies.

In 2024, NZ Post issued a set of four commemorative stamps depicting the True Colours album cover ($2.00 purple/yellow, $3.30 yellow/blue, $4.00 blue/orange, $6.90 red/green).

== Reissues ==
True Colours was remastered by Eddie Rayner and re-released on two occasions. Firstly in 2003, and yet again with the rest of the Split Enz catalogue on 20 May 2006 with the bonus tracks "Things" and "Two of a Kind". In October 2010, the album was listed at number 22 in the book, 100 Best Australian Albums, despite Split Enz being a New Zealand group.

On the 40th anniversary of the release in 2020, the album was remixed by Rayner, reissued as True Colours: 40th Anniversary Mix and reached number one on the New Zealand Albums chart again. According to Recorded Music NZ, this set a record for the album with the longest span between weeks at number one.

== Critical reception ==
Professional ratings
Review scores
Source	Rating
AllMusic	4/5 stars
MusicHound	4/5
The New Rolling Stone Record Guide	4/5 stars
Smash Hits	5/10

Reviewed in Roadrunner at the time of release, it was described as, "a thoughtful, reflective album. The approach to songs is more straight forward, more serious, than the Split Enz we are all used to."

Crombie later said, "I think we split our audience to some extent. It seemed like a real sort of dividing point. Suddenly we had a lot of teenage girls in our audience and it moved into a different kind of vibe in terms of live performance". Tim Finn agreed, "If you were a Mental Notes freak, you might have taken a step back at that point."

== Track listing ==
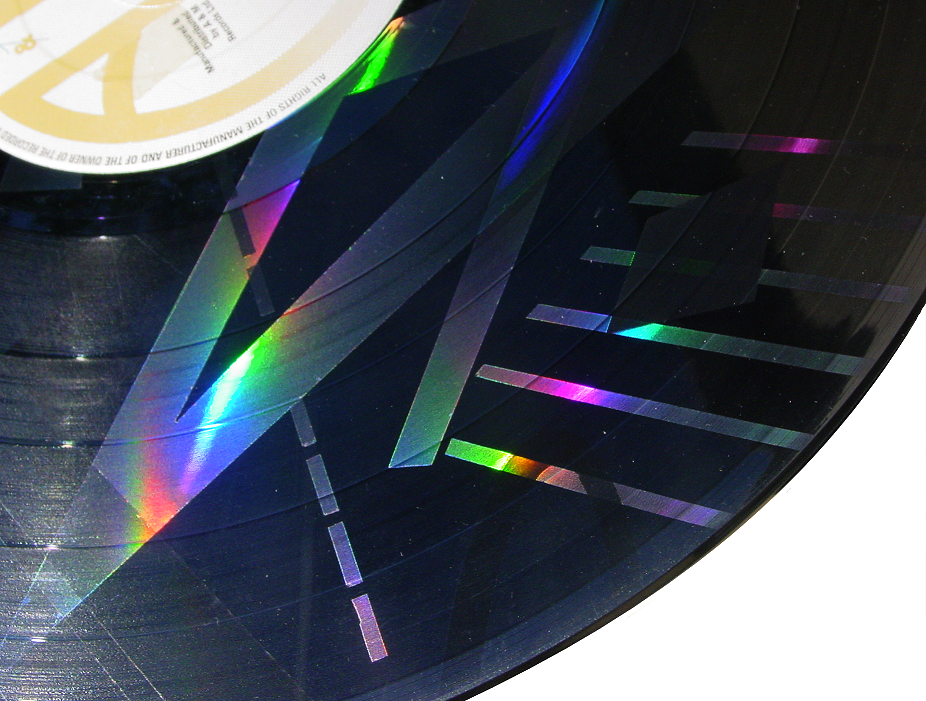
Close up of the laser-etched A&M release

On the A&M version (SP-4822), tracks 1 and 2 are inverted. The listing below is the original Mushroom (AUS) / Polydor (NZ) listing.

All tracks are written by Tim Finn except where noted.

Side one
No.	Title	Writer(s)	Length
1.	"Shark Attack"		2:52
2.	"I Got You"	Neil Finn	3:24
3.	"What's the Matter with You"	N. Finn	3:02
4.	"Double Happy" (instrumental)	Eddie Rayner	3:15
5.	"I Wouldn't Dream of It"		3:14
6.	"I Hope I Never"		3:24
Total length:			19:11

Side two
No.	Title	Writer(s)	Length
7.	"Nobody Takes Me Seriously"		3:32
8.	"Missing Person"	N. Finn	3:32
9.	"Poor Boy"		3:19
10.	"How Can I Resist Her"		3:26
11.	"The Choral Sea" (instrumental)	T. Finn; N. Finn; Rayner; Noel Crombie; Malcolm Green; Nigel Griggs	4:29
Total length:			18:18 37:29

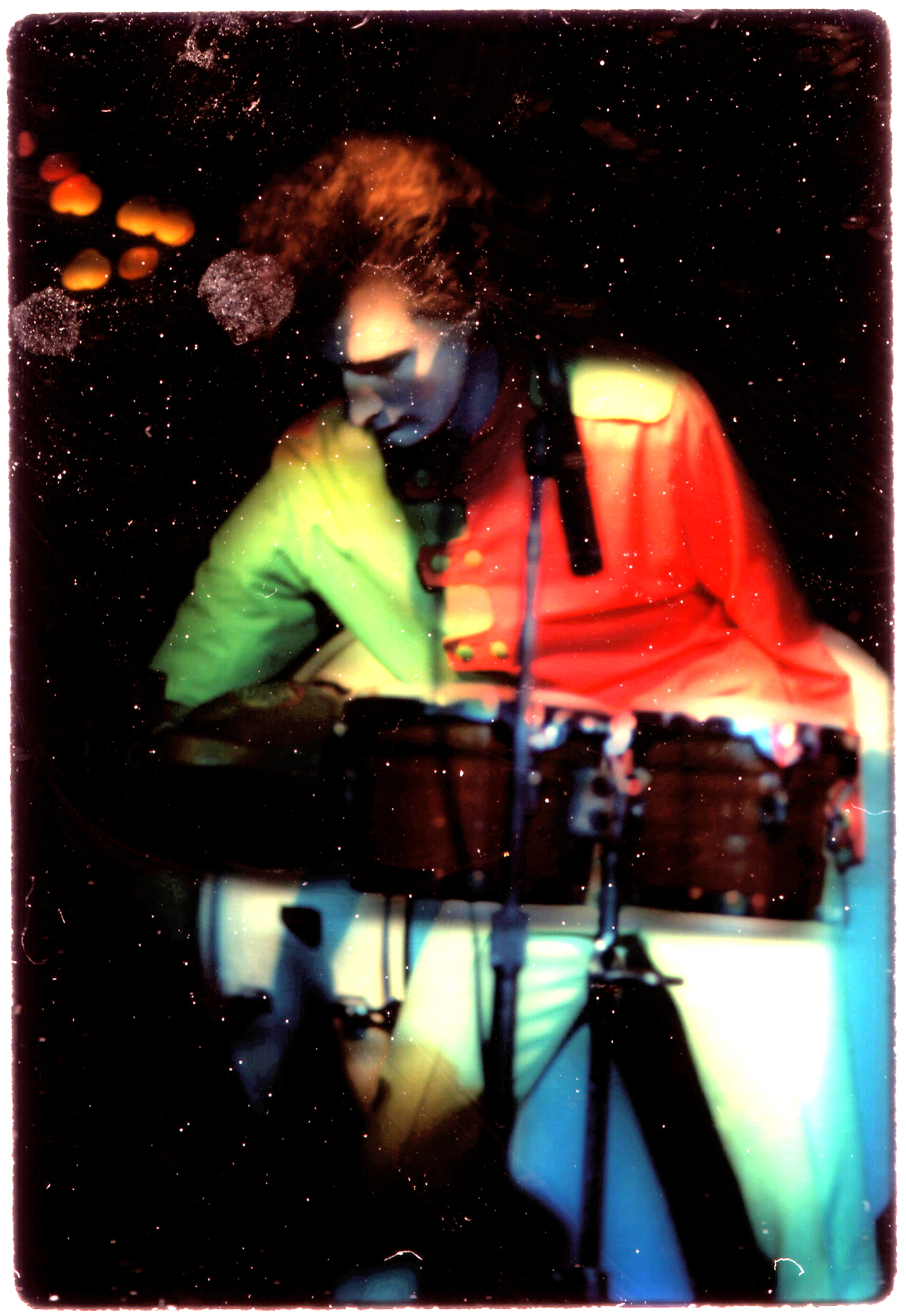
True Colours Tour, Commodore Ballroom.

Bonus tracks on 2006 re-release
No.	Title	Writer(s)	Length
12.	"Things"	N. Finn	2:48
13.	"Two of a Kind"		3:41

Bonus tracks on 40th anniversary remix edition (2020)
No.	Title	Writer(s)	Length
12.	"Firedrill" (live from the Capitol Theatre Sydney, July 1982)		4:43
13.	"Hard Act to Follow" (live from Logan Campbell Centre Auckland, December 1984)		4:00
14.	"I Walk Away" (live from Festival Hall Melbourne, November, 1984)	N. Finn	3:40
15.	"Log Cabin Fever" (live from the Capitol Theatre Sydney, July 1982)	N. Finn	4:31
16.	"Lost for Words" (live from the Capitol Theatre Sydney, July 1982)	Griggs	3:41
17.	"Ninnee Neez Up" (live from Festival Hall Melbourne, November, 1984)	Crombie	4:10
18.	"Wail" (instrumental; live from the Regent Theatre Sydney, March 1981)	Rayner	2:57

== Personnel ==
Personnel as listed in the album's liner notes are:

=== Split Enz ===
- Tim Finn – vocals
- Neil Finn – guitars, vocals
- Eddie Rayner – keyboards
- Nigel Griggs – bass guitar
- Malcolm Green – drums
- Noel Crombie – percussion

=== Production ===
- David Tickle – production, engineering
- Scott Hemming — engineering

== Charts ==
=== Weekly charts ===
Weekly chart performance for True Colours
Chart (1980–1981)	Peak position
Australian Albums (Kent Music Report)	1
Canadian Albums (RPM)	10
New Zealand Albums (RMNZ)	1
UK Albums (OCC)	38
US Billboard 200	40

=== Year-end charts ===
Year-end chart performance for True Colours
Chart (1980)	Peak position
Australia (Kent Music Report)	3
New Zealand Albums (RMNZ)	2
Chart (1981)	Position
New Zealand Albums (RMNZ)	20

== Certifications and sales ==
Certifications and sales for True Colours
Region	Certification	Certified units/sales
Australia (ARIA)	5× Platinum	350,000^{^}
Canada (Music Canada)	2× Platinum	200,000^{^}
^{^} Shipments figures based on certification alone.

- NB: The album is "multi platinum" in New Zealand.

== See also ==
- List of Top 25 albums for 1980 in Australia
