= Dizrythmia =

Studio album by Split Enz
- Released: 29 August 1977
- Recorded: June – July 1977
- Studio: AIR
- Genre: Art rock
- Length: 40:21
- Labels: Mushroom (AUS/NZ); Chrysalis (overseas)
- Producers: Geoff Emerick; Split Enz

Split Enz chronology
Second Thoughts (1976)	Dizrythmia (1977)	Frenzy (1979)

Singles from Dizrythmia
- 1. "My Mistake" Released: September 1977; 2. "Bold as Brass" Released: 1977

Professional ratings
Review scores
Source	Rating
AllMusic	4/5 stars
The New Rolling Stone Record Guide	3/5 stars

Dizrythmia (1977) is the third studio album released by New Zealand new wave band Split Enz. It was the first Split Enz album without co-founding members Phil Judd and Mike Chunn. Judd's departure left Tim Finn as the band's sole leader and main songwriter. Neil Finn, younger brother of Tim Finn, and Nigel Griggs replaced Judd and Chunn respectively. Meanwhile, Nigel's old friend and former bandmate Malcolm Green took the place of Emlyn Crowther, who also left around this time. The album was released domestically by Mushroom Records, and overseas by Chrysalis Records.

The single "My Mistake" was a hit in New Zealand and Australia, but failed to make much impact overseas. "Bold as Brass" was the second single. The album is regarded as the start of the band's commercial breakthrough, and marked a shift from art rock to more pop-oriented songs.

The album's title comes from circadian dysrhythmia, more commonly known as jet lag.

The back cover was originally intended as the front cover. Both were designed by the band's percussionist Noel Crombie, who also designed the band's costumes.

Tim Finn coughs forty-four seconds into "Nice to Know", a feature erroneously left in the final mix.

Both Tim Finn and keyboardist Eddie Rayner were disappointed with the final mix of "Charlie", feeling that the vocals sounded very flat. Geoff Emerick, the engineer for the album, thought it was a beautiful vocal, however, so it stayed.

== Track listing ==
Side one
No.	Title	Writer(s)	Length
1.	"Bold as Brass"	Tim Finn; Robert Gillies	3:31
2.	"My Mistake"	Finn; Eddie Rayner	3:02
3.	"Parrot Fashion Love"	Finn; Rayner	3:53
4.	"Sugar and Spice"	Phil Judd	3:52
5.	"Without a Doubt"	Finn	6:00
Total length:			20:18

Side two
No.	Title	Writer(s)	Length
6.	"Crosswords"	Finn	3:25
7.	"Charlie"	Finn	5:31
8.	"Nice to Know"	Finn; Rayner; Judd	4:24
9.	"Jamboree"	Finn; Gillies; Rayner; Judd; Noel Crombie; Malcolm Green; Mike Chunn	6:43
Total length:			20:03 40:21

Bonus track on 2006 re-release
No.	Title	Writer(s)	Length
10.	"Another Great Divide"	Finn; Rayner; Judd	3:37

== Personnel ==
Personnel as listed in the album's liner notes are:

=== Split Enz ===
- Timothy Finn – vocals, acoustic guitar, piano
- Neil Finn – vocals, guitars, mandolin
- Edward Rayner – keyboards
- Noel Crombie – vocals, percussion, sleeve design
- Robert Gillies – saxophones, trumpet
- Malcolm Green – drums
- Nigel Griggs – bass guitar
- Phil Judd — vocals and guitar on "Another Great Divide"
- Mike Chunn – vocals and bass guitar on "Another Great Divide"

=== Additional musicians ===
- Mal Jacobson – Sonor drums and percussion

=== Production ===
- Peter Wogg — sleeve design
- Han Chew Tham — photographs
- Peter Henderson — engineer
- Nigel Walker — assistant engineer

== Charts ==
=== Weekly charts ===
Chart (1977)	Peak position
Australia (Kent Music Report)	18
New Zealand Albums (RMNZ)	3

=== Year-end charts ===
Chart (1977)	Position
New Zealand Albums (RMNZ)	40

== Certifications and sales ==
Region	Certification	Certified units/sales
Australia (ARIA)	Gold	35,000^{^}
^{^} Shipments figures based on certification alone.
