= Emlyn Crowther =

Emlyn Crowther MNZM
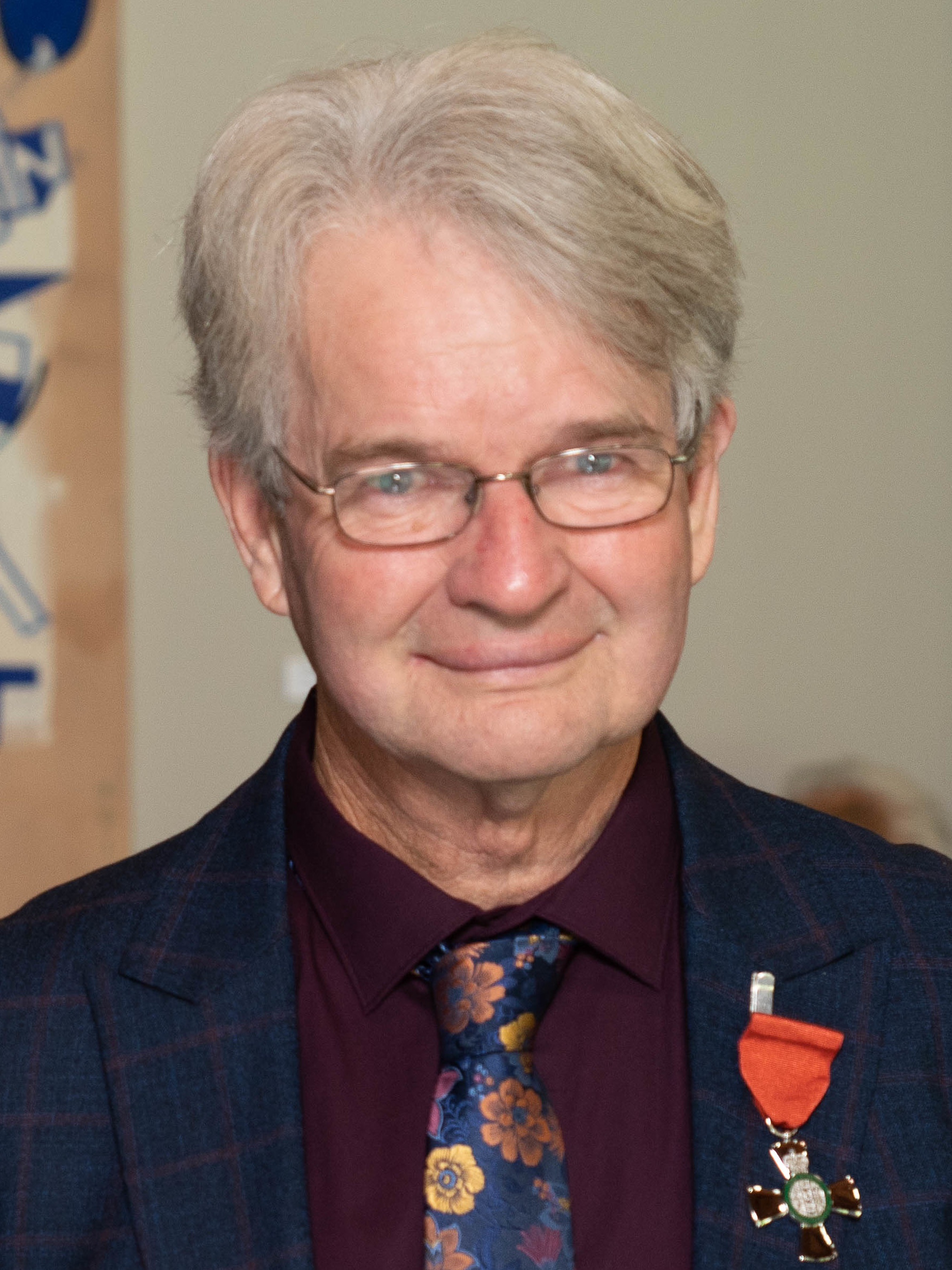
- Crowther in 2021

Background information
- Born: Paul Emlyn Crowther; 1949 (age 76–77); Dunedin, New Zealand
- Instrument: Drums
- Formerly of: Split Enz

Paul Emlyn Crowther MNZM (born 2 October 1949 in Dunedin, New Zealand) is the former drummer of Split Enz who performed with the band from July 1974 to November 1976.

Before joining the Enz, Crowther played trumpet in an air training corp band but swapped to drums later on. Moved to Auckland in 1969 and played drums in a couple of covers bands and Alastair Riddell's band, Orb. Riddell was at one stage a possible replacement for Phil Judd when he left Split Enz in 1977.

As well as drumming on the first two Enz albums, Mental Notes (1975) and Second Thoughts (1976), Crowther (by this stage known as Emlyn), was an electronics and live sound expert who also built the synthesizers used on Mental Notes.

Crowther invented the Hotcake guitar distortion pedal in 1976, which has been used by Neil Finn of Split Enz and Crowded House, Noel Gallagher of Oasis, Hugh Harris of The Kooks, Buzz Osborne of The Melvins, Thurston Moore of Sonic Youth, Stephen Malkmus of Pavement and The Jicks, J Mascis of Dinosaur Jr., Nels Cline of Wilco, Cory Messenger of The Welcome Mat, Ed O'Brien of Radiohead and Adrian Utley of Portishead. In 1996 he created the 'Prunes and Custard', originally designed as a bass guitar distortion pedal. The Datsuns' song "Harmonic Generator" is named after this pedal.

Apparently the Hotcake was re-designed from the switch to the dial after Nigel Regan from Head Like a Hole kept on breaking them while playing and was constantly taking them to get fixed.

After Split Enz, Crowther drummed in a few local bands, did live mixing work for New Zealand band The Mutton Birds and was involved with a sound company between 1980 and 1990. He currently resides in Auckland with his wife and son, and runs a company named Crowther Audio, manufacturing effects pedals and other equipment.

Crowther currently plays drums for the 1960s cover band 'The Con-Rays' which includes former Split Enz keyboard player Eddie Rayner.

In 2014 he was presented with a Scroll of Honour from the Variety Artists Club of New Zealand for his contribution to New Zealand entertainment.

In the 2020 New Year Honours, Crowther was appointed a Member of the New Zealand Order of Merit, for services to music.

== Bibliography ==
- Chunn, Mike, Stranger Than Fiction: The Life and Times of Split Enz, GP Publications, 1992. ISBN 1-86956-050-7
- Chunn, Mike, Stranger Than Fiction: The Life and Times of Split Enz, (revised, ebook edition), Hurricane Press, 2013. ISBN 978-0-9922556-3-3
