= Split Enz =

New Zealand new wave band (1972–1984)

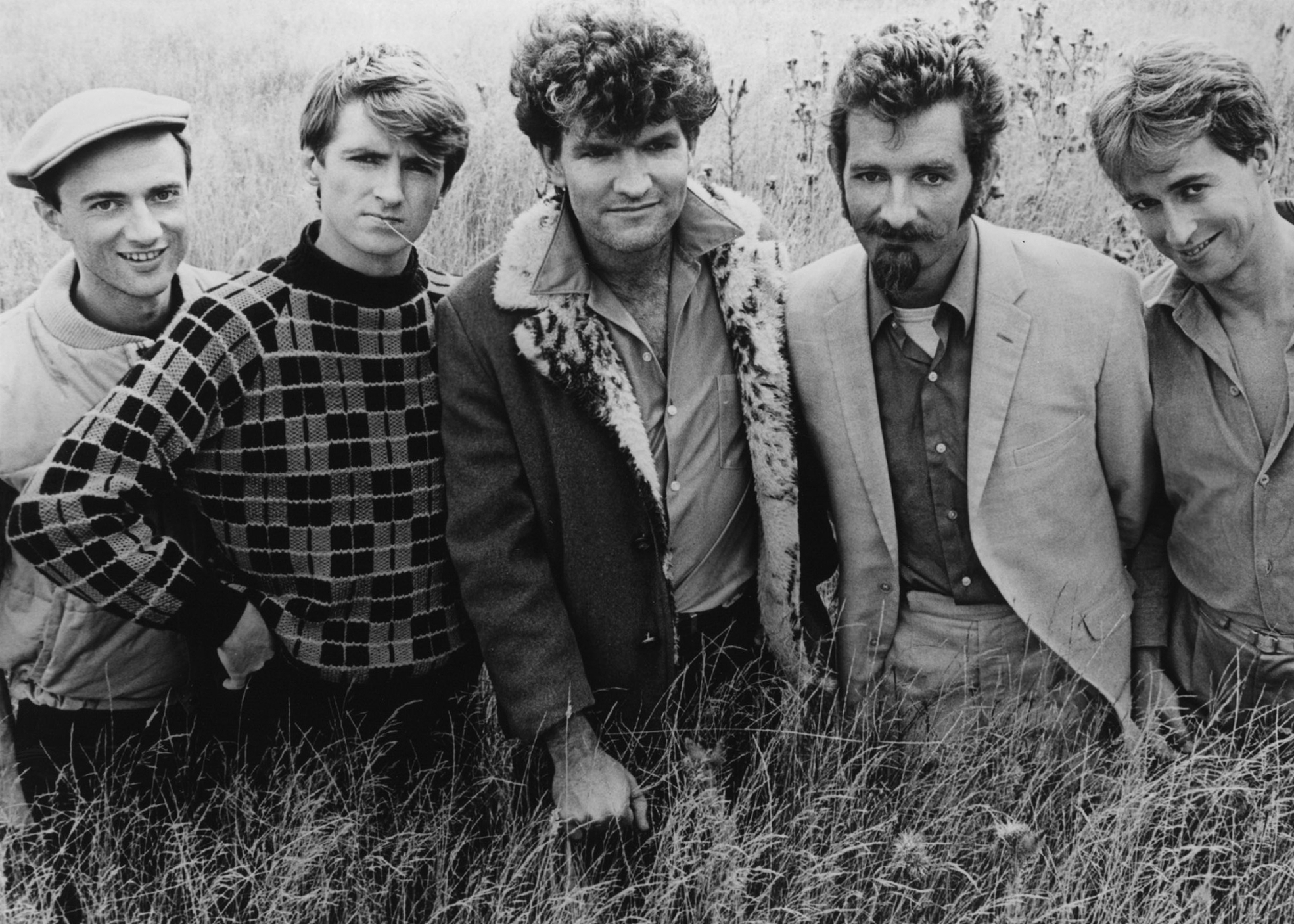
- Split Enz in 1982. (L-R); Nigel Griggs, Neil Finn, Tim Finn, Noel Crombie, and Eddie Rayner

Background information
- Origin: Auckland, New Zealand
- Genres: Progressive rock (early); new wave; art rock; pop rock; post-punk
- Works: Split Enz discography
- Years active: 1972–1984; Temporary reunions: 1986, 1989–1990, 1992–1993, 1999, 2002, 2005–2006, 2008–2009, 2025–present
- Labels: Mushroom, Chrysalis, A&M
- Spinoffs: Forenzics; Crowded House; Finn Brothers; Citizen Band; Schnell Fenster; The Swingers; The Makers; Enzso
- Past members: See Members

Split Enz are a New Zealand band formed in 1972 in Auckland. Regarded as the first New Zealand band to gain significant recognition outside of Australasia, they were initially noted for their progressive/art rock sound, flamboyant visual style and theatrical performances. The band later moved toward a pop/new wave sound that yielded hit singles such as "I See Red" (1978), "I Got You" (1980), "History Never Repeats" (1981), "Dirty Creature" (1982) and "Message to My Girl" (1983). The band also released several critically acclaimed and commercially successful albums, including Mental Notes (1975), Dizrythmia (1977), True Colours (1980), Waiata (1981) and Time and Tide (1982). Split Enz broke up in 1984. From 1986 to 2009, the band staged several reunion concerts. In 2026, they reformed again for Electric Avenue Festival in Christchurch, followed by a tour of New Zealand and Australia.

== History ==
=== 1972–1984 ===
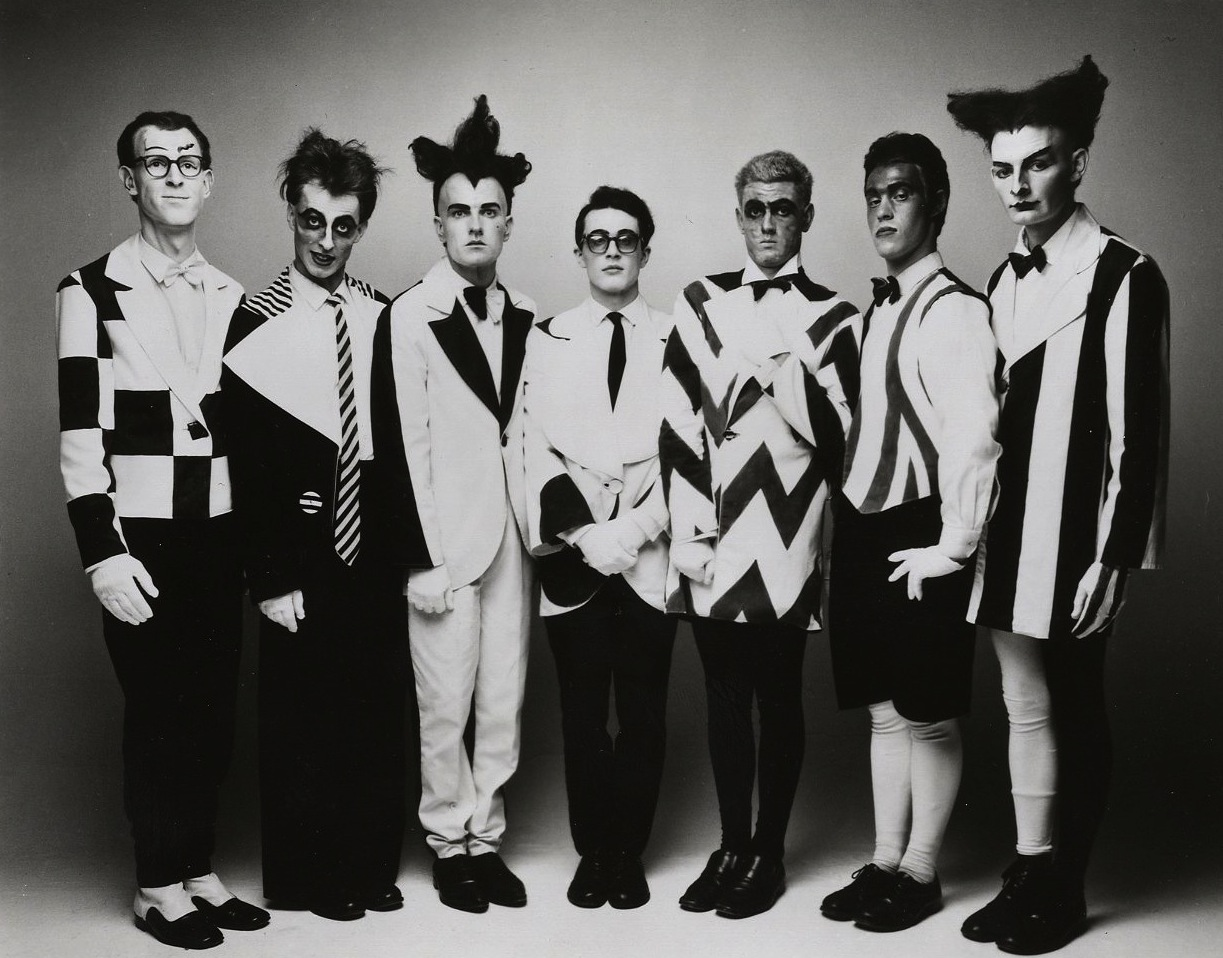
Split Enz in 1976. (L-R); Rob Gillies, Eddie Rayner, Tim Finn, Mike Chunn, Phil Judd, Malcolm Green, and Noel Crombie

Originally named Split Ends (presumably referencing split ends of hairs), the band were formed by songwriters Tim Finn (vocals) and Phil Judd (guitar/vocals). The original line-up was completed by Mike Chunn (bass), Miles Golding (violin) and Mike Howard (flute). With no drummer and only acoustic guitars rather than electric, the band initially adopted a folksy, almost chamber music sound and presentation, giving their first live performance on 10 December 1972, at the Wynyard Tavern in Auckland, New Zealand. Shortly after, they were joined by drummer Div Vercoe, though within a few months, Vercoe, Golding and Howard had all departed, with Finn, Judd and Chunn recruiting Chunn's brother Geoff on drums, along with Wally Wilkinson, who brought electric guitar to the band. In late 1973, Split Ends appeared as contestants on the television talent show New Faces. They made it to the next round but lost the following week, with judge Phil Warren complaining that they were "too clever". In early 1974, the band's sound evolved further with the addition of keyboardist Eddie Rayner and saxophonist Rob Gillies. It was around this time that they altered their name to Split Enz, with the "nz" referring to New Zealand.

During 1973 and 1974, the group recorded three singles, "For You", "The Sweet Talking Spoon Song" and "No Bother to Me" (the last not being released until 1975). Those singles and their B-sides, along with several demos from this period, would later be released as The Beginning of the Enz album in 1979. Later in 1974, Rob Gillies and Geoff Chunn left the band, with the latter being replaced by Emlyn Crowther, while Noel Crombie also joined as percussionist and the band's visual director. In the early years of Split Enz, they were known as an "adventurous, flamboyant art-rock band" with unique, theatrical live shows, which evolved during a run of Buck-A-Head theatre concerts in Auckland during 1974, where they gained a strong cult following. In 1975, the band moved to Australia, signed to Mushroom Records - who would remain their record company in Australasia for the rest of their history - and recorded their first album, Mental Notes, which reached No. 7 in New Zealand and No. 35 in Australia. Shortly after the album's release, Wally Wilkinson departed and Rob Gillies re-joined.

In 1976, the band moved to England, where they obtained a UK and US contract with Chrysalis Records. Recorded in London, Split Enz's second album, Second Thoughts, was produced by Roxy Music guitarist Phil Manzanera. While in the UK, the band toured as support to English folk-rockers Jack the Lad. Emlyn Crowther left the band in late 1976 and was replaced by English drummer Malcolm Green, the first member of Split Enz not to have been born and/or raised in New Zealand.

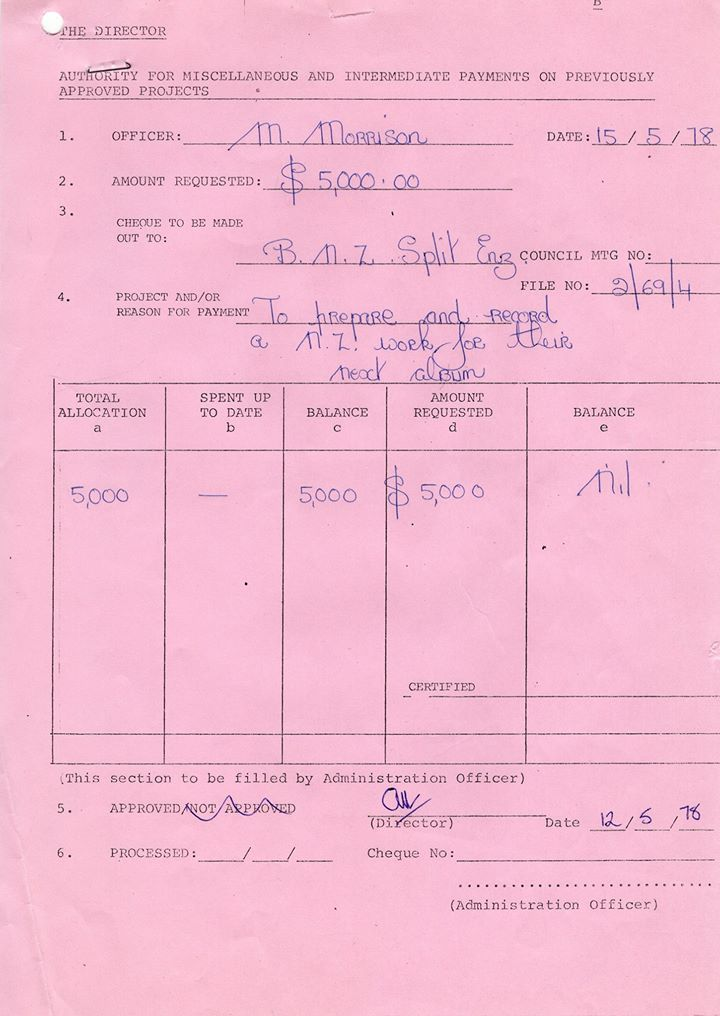
Grant of $5000 NZD for Split Enz from NZ Arts Council

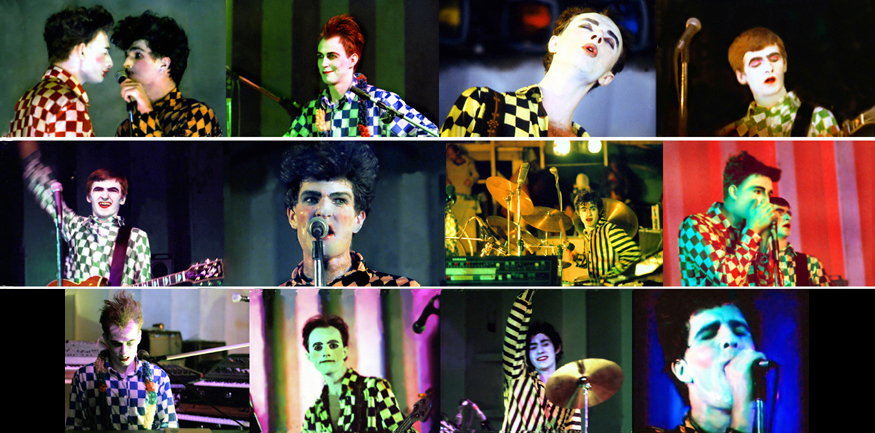
Split Enz at the Nambassa festival, New Zealand, January 1979

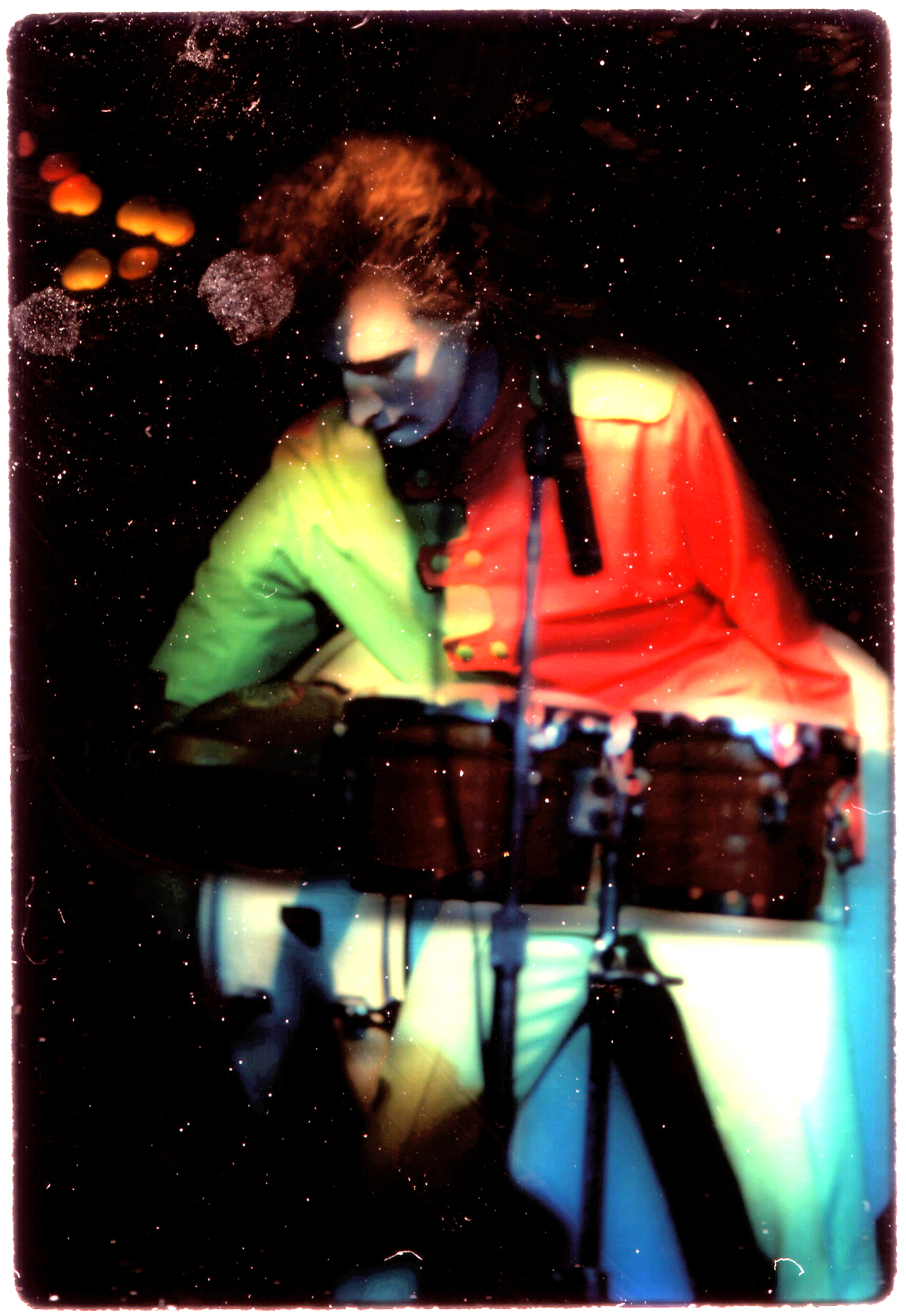
Noel Combie during the True Colours Tour, Commodore Ballroom, 1980

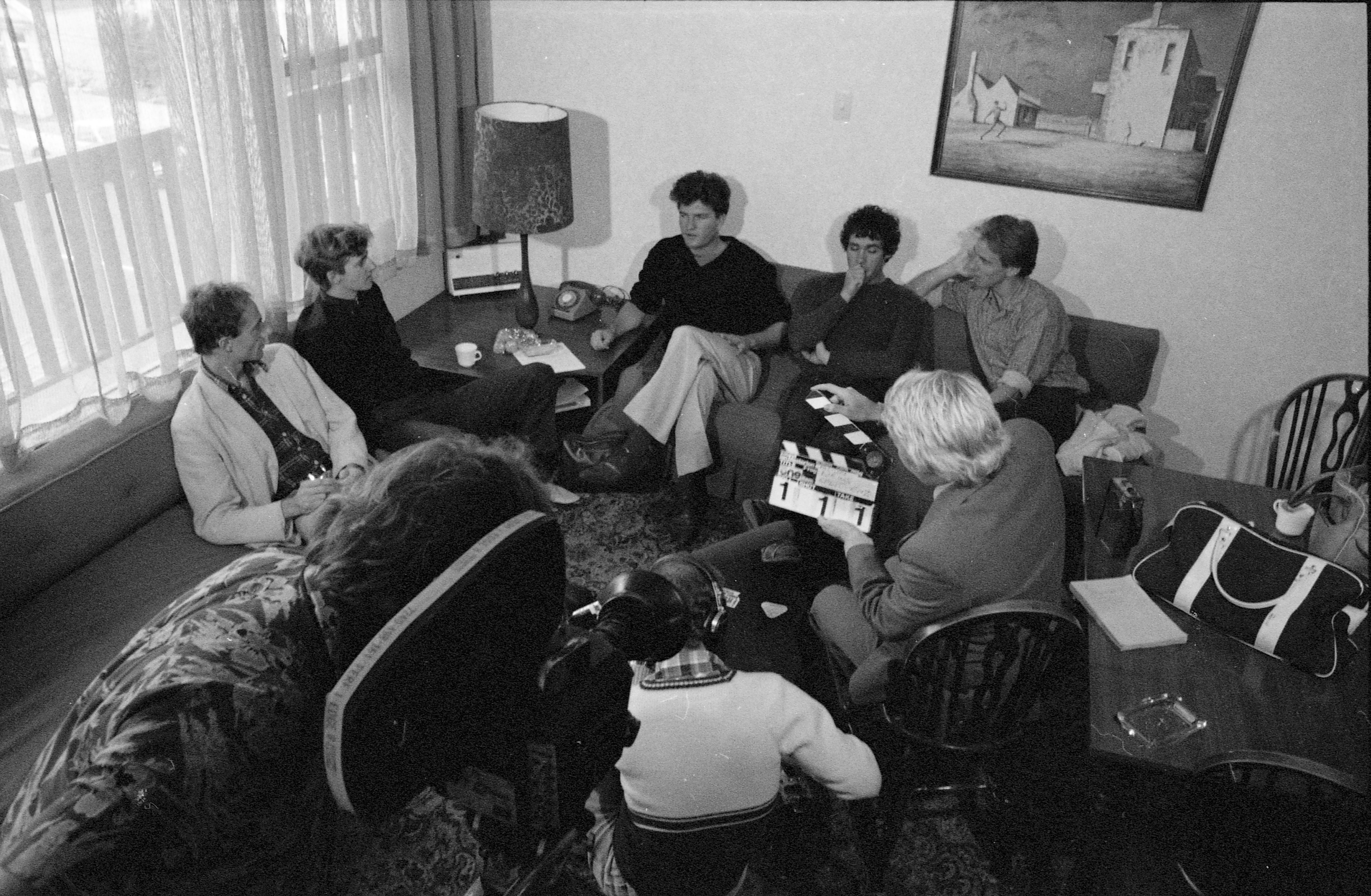
Members of Split Enz being interviewed in 1980

Phil Judd and Mike Chunn left the band in 1977. Tim Finn's brother, Neil Finn, flew over from New Zealand to England and joined as Judd's replacement on 7 April 1977, while English bassist Nigel Griggs replaced Chunn. Over time, as well as being the band's guitarist, Neil Finn became their co-lead singer and a key songwriter, both alongside his brother Tim. Split Enz's third album, Dizrythmia, was recorded at London's AIR Studios with producer, and former Beatles engineer, Geoff Emerick, from June to July 1977. The album was released in August 1977. The beginning of 1978 saw Rob Gillies leave the band and Phil Judd briefly re-join. His return only lasted a few weeks, after which the remaining members continued as a six-piece. Judd went on to form the successful new wave band the Swingers, whose biggest hit, "Counting the Beat", would reach No. 1 in both New Zealand and Australia in 1981.

By the summer of 1978, Split Enz had no agent, no manager, and no UK or US record contract, having been dropped by Chrysalis. The New Zealand Arts Council gave the band a grant of $5,000. The grant money was used to book studio time in Luton, England, where the band recorded demos that later became known as the "Rootin' Tootin' Luton Tapes". One of the songs from those sessions was "I See Red". Released as a single later that year, "I See Red" marked a significant move away from the band's early progressive/art rock style, towards high-energy, guitar-based power pop. While "I See Red" did not chart in the UK, where it was released on Illegal Records, it did bring the band critical attention. The single peaked at No. 15 in New Zealand.

The group moved back to New Zealand for Christmas 1978. Just after Christmas, there was a serious setback when their equipment was destroyed in a suspicious fire at a rehearsal studio. Using borrowed equipment, Split Enz played what proved to be a pivotal concert, stunning friends and fans alike with a legendary performance at the second Nambassa Festival in January 1979. The band released their fourth album, Frenzy, in 1979. At the end of that year, the band signed to A&M Records in the UK and US.

True Colours, released in 1980, further marked the band's shift to a power-pop style. The hit single "I Got You" reached No. 1 in Australia, New Zealand and Canada, No. 12 in the UK and No. 53 in the US. True Colours reached No. 1 on the album charts in Australia and New Zealand and made the Top 40 in both the UK and the US.

Split Enz's next album, 1981's Waiata, released as Corroboree in Australia, reached No. 1 in Australia and New Zealand. After the album's completion, Malcolm Green departed, and the band continued as a five-piece, with Noel Crombie moving from percussionist to drummer. The follow-up album, 1982's Time and Tide, reached No. 1 in Australia, New Zealand, and Canada. One of the album's songs, "Six Months in a Leaky Boat", was listed as the fifth-best New Zealand song of all time in the 2001 Australasian Performing Right Association, but the song became controversial in the UK because it was perceived as a criticism of the Falklands War.

After releasing Conflicting Emotions in 1983, the band became a six-piece again with the addition of Australian drummer Paul Hester, while Crombie returned to his previous role of percussionist. In the spring of 1984, Tim Finn left the band for a solo career, following the success of his first solo album, Escapade, the previous year. This left the band with no original members from its founding as Split Ends. Neil Finn assumed the role of band leader and main songwriter, but felt uncomfortable continuing the band without either of its founders Tim Finn or Phil Judd. It was decided their next album, See Ya 'Round, would be their last. Following the album's release, Tim Finn re-joined for a farewell tour, dubbed the "Enz with a Bang!" tour. Split Enz played their final show on 6 December 1984 at Logan Campbell Centre in Auckland, after which they officially split.

=== Crowded House ===
Neil Finn and Paul Hester went on to form a new band called the Mullanes with bassist Nick Seymour. They had changed their name to Crowded House by the time their self-titled first album was released in 1986, going on to achieve worldwide success. Eddie Rayner also worked with the band as a producer and session musician on assorted studio recordings and live dates, although declined the offer to become a full band member, citing family commitments. Tim Finn joined Crowded House as a fourth member from 1989 to 1991, during which time the band recorded and released their third album, Woodface.

=== Reunions ===
In 1986, two years after Split Enz broke up, they reunited for a Greenpeace benefit concert. That was followed by a pair of concerts in Australia in 1989/1990. The first of those performances was scheduled for 28 December 1989 at the Newcastle Worker's Club. However, the club was virtually destroyed that morning by an earthquake. The band instead appeared at a benefit concert in February 1990 which raised funds to support the town's recovery.

On 10 December 1992, the band gave a one-off performance at the Wynyard Tavern in Auckland, exactly 20 years to the day of their first public appearance at the same venue. The band followed with a 20th anniversary tour in 1993, during which they played at Christchurch, Wellington, and Auckland, supported by The Holy Toledos. The line-up for this tour was the same as the group's final live line-up from the Enz With A Bang tour: Finn, Finn, Rayner, Griggs, Hester and Crombie. The band gave two concerts in Auckland on 30 and 31 December 1999, appeared on several TV shows during 2002 to celebrate their 30th anniversary and the release of the Split Enz DVD, and performed at their induction into the ARIA Hall of Fame in 2005. Two more reunion tours followed in 2006 and 2008, followed by a one-off reunion performance on 14 March 2009, as part of the Sound Relief festival.

The band headlined the Christchurch Electric Avenue Festival in February 2026, marking their first performance together in nearly two decades. For this reunion, the band consisted of Tim and Neil Finn, Noel Crombie, and Eddie Rayner, joined by Matt Eccles on drums and James Milne on bass. The "Forever Enz" tour of New Zealand and Australia took place in May 2026, kicking off at Hamilton's Claudelands Arena on 2 May. The band played three nights in Melbourne, two in Sydney, and their final concert of the "Forever Enz" tour of New Zealand and Australia was held at the Adelaide Entertainment Centre in Adelaide, South Australia, on 25 May 2026. Vika and Linda Bull were the opening act of the concert.

=== Legacy ===
Split Enz had ten albums (including seven studio albums) reach the top 10 of the Official New Zealand Music Chart. They have had eight songs listed in the APRA Top 100 New Zealand Songs of All Time, more than any other band.

== Current members ==
- Tim Finn – vocals, acoustic guitar, piano (1972–1984, 1986–2009, 2025–present)
- Eddie Rayner – keyboards, piano, backing vocals (1974–1984, 1986–2009, 2025–present)
- Noel Crombie – percussion, drums, backing vocals (1974–1984, 1986–2009, 2025–present)
- Neil Finn – vocals, guitar, mandolin (1977–1984, 1986–2009, 2025–present)
- James Milne – bass, backing vocals (2025–present)
- Matt Eccles – drums, backing vocals (2025–present)

== Discography ==
Studio albums

- Mental Notes (1975)
- Second Thoughts (1976, titled Mental Notes outside Australasia)
- Dizrythmia (1977)
- Frenzy (1979)
- True Colours (1980)
- Waiata (1981, titled Corroboree in Australia)
- Time and Tide (1982)
- Conflicting Emotions (1983)
- See Ya 'Round (1984)

== Awards and nominations ==
=== ARIA Music Awards ===
The ARIA Music Awards is an annual awards ceremony that recognises excellence, innovation, and achievement across all genres of Australian music. They commenced in 1987. Split Enz were inducted into the Hall of Fame in 2005.

Year	Nominee / work	Award	Result
2005	Split Enz	ARIA Hall of Fame	Inductee

=== TV Week / Countdown Awards ===
Countdown was an Australian pop music TV series on national broadcaster ABC-TV from 1974 to 1987. It presented music awards from 1979 to 1987, initially in conjunction with magazine TV Week. The TV Week / Countdown Awards were a combination of popular-voted and peer-voted awards.

Year	Nominee / work	Award	Result
1980	True Colours	Best Australian Album	Nominated
1980	True Colours	Most Popular Australian Record	Nominated
1980	True Colours	Best Australian Record Cover Design	Nominated
1980	"I Got You"	Best Single Record	Won
1980	Split Enz	Most Outstanding Achievement	Nominated
1980	Split Enz	Most Popular Group	Nominated
1980	Neil Finn (Split Enz)	Best Recorded Song Writer	Nominated
1981	Split Enz	Most Popular Group	Nominated
1981	Neil Finn (Split Enz)	Best Australian Songwriter	Nominated
1981	Neil Finn (Split Enz)	Most Popular Male Performer	Nominated
1982	Time and Tide	Best Australian Album	Won
1982	"Six Months in a Leaky Boat"	Best Australian Single	Nominated
1982	Split Enz	Most Popular Group	Won
1983	Split Enz	Most Popular Group	Nominated

== Bibliography ==
- Chunn, Mike. Stranger Than Fiction: The Life and Times of Split Enz. GP Publications, 1992. ISBN 1-86956-050-7
- Chunn, Mike. Stranger Than Fiction: The Life and Times of Split Enz (revised ebook edition). Hurricane Press, 2013. ISBN 978-0-9922556-3-3
- Dix, John. Stranded in Paradise: New Zealand Rock and Roll, 1955 to the Modern Era. Penguin Books, 2005. ISBN 0-14-301953-8
- Green, Peter. Letters to My Frenz. Rocket Pocket Books, 2006. ISBN 0-9579712-3-0
- Green, Peter, and Goulding, Mark, Wings Off Flies. Rocket Pocket Books, 2002. ISBN 0-9579712-2-2
