= Malcolm Green (musician) =

British drummer (born 1953)

- Born: January 25, 1953 (age 73); England
- Genres: Rock, new wave
- Occupations: Drummer, music producer
- Instrument: Drums

Malcolm Green (born 25 January 1953) is an English-born drummer best known as a member of New Zealand band Split Enz from 1976 to 1981.

Green replaced Emlyn Crowther as Split Enz's drummer in London in 1976, winning an audition over ex-Sparks drummer Dinky Diamond. Green had formerly played with Love Affair, The Honeycombs (both of them long after their run of 1960s hits), and Octopus. He was joined in Split Enz by Octopus bassist Nigel Griggs, who replaced Mike Chunn.

Green was sacked from Split Enz in early 1981 after disagreements with frontman Tim Finn over the rejection of Green's offered songwriting contributions (the band never recorded or released any songs by Green). Green released a non-charting solo single, "Follow Me", shortly after his departure from the group. He subsequently settled in Sydney, Australia, where he produced music at his own home studio. He also drummed for and acted as a mentor to Sydney band Gethsemane.

In 2005, Green accepted an invitation to play with Split Enz at its induction into the ARIA Hall of Fame in Australia. In 2006, he rejoined Split Enz for its Australian reunion tour, sharing drumming duties with Noel Crombie. Green did not, however, take part in Split Enz's reunion tour of New Zealand in 2008, during which drumming duties were handled by Michael Barker.

In 2014, Green returned to Britain to be closer to his elderly father.

== Bibliography ==
- Chunn, Mike, Stranger Than Fiction: The Life and Times of Split Enz, GP Publications, 1992. ISBN 1-86956-050-7
- Chunn, Mike, Stranger Than Fiction: The Life and Times of Split Enz, (revised, ebook edition), Hurricane Press, 2013. ISBN 978-0-9922556-3-3
