= Noel Crombie =

New Zealand percussionist

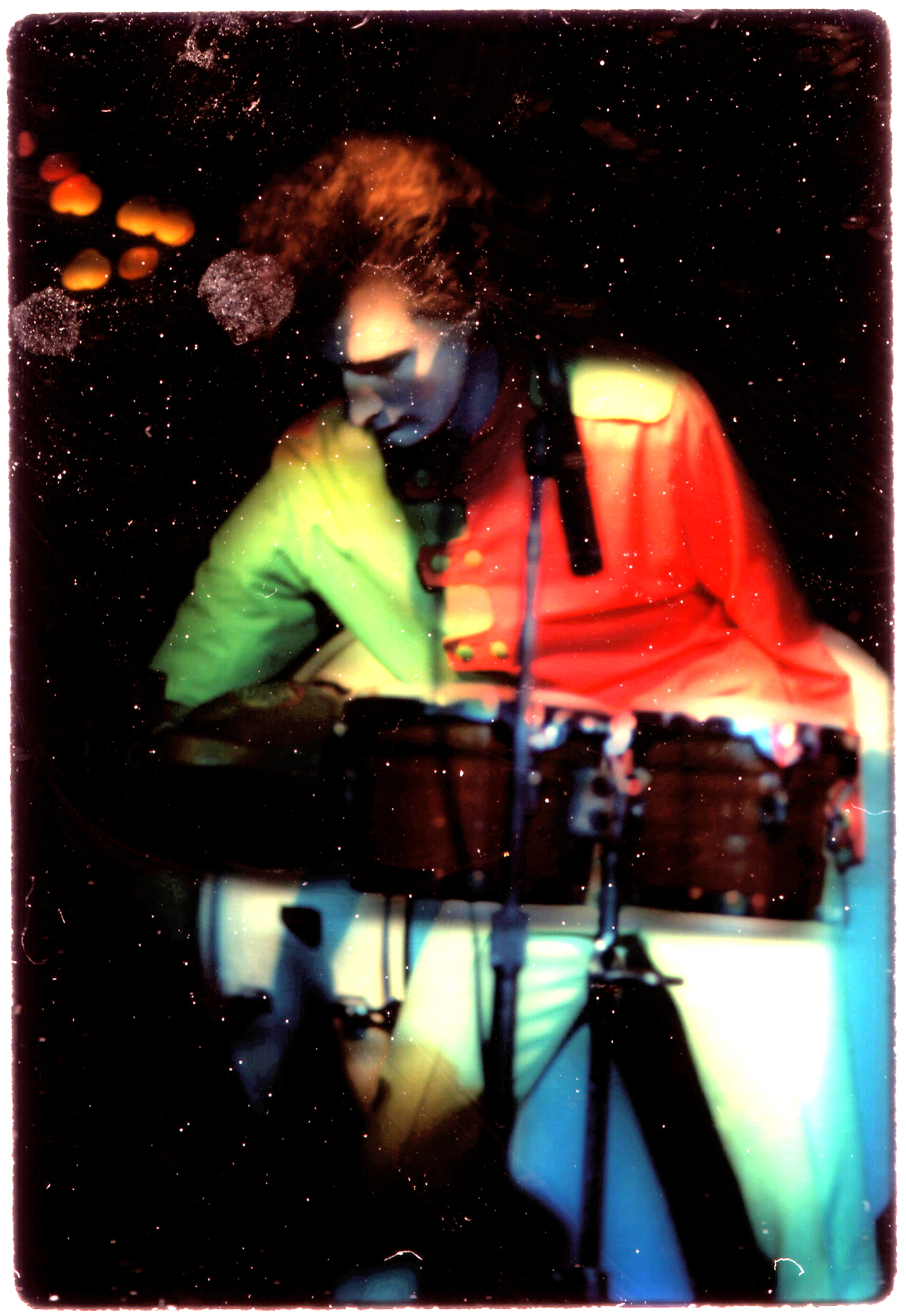
- Crombie at True Colours Tour

Background information
- Born: 17 April 1953 (age 73); Wellington, New Zealand
- Origin: Auckland, New Zealand
- Genre: Art rock
- Occupations: Musician; costume designer; album cover designer; director
- Instruments: Percussion; drums
- Member of: Forenzics
- Formerly of: Split Enz; Schnell Fenster

Geoffrey Noel Crombie (born 17 April 1953) is a New Zealand percussionist and member of the band Split Enz. He fulfilled multiple roles including costume and hair designer, singer, album cover designer, and music video director. Prior to Split Enz, Crombie worked as a postal assistant and was also an artist. He attended Mana College and then moved to Auckland to study art at Elam School of Fine Arts.

For the album Time and Tide, Crombie took over the role of drummer, though a year later returned to percussion, with Paul Hester becoming Split Enz's drummer. He is particularly remembered for playing spoon solos during Split Enz live shows.

After Split Enz disbanded, Noel formed the band Schnell Fenster with Phil Judd, Eddie Rayner and Nigel Griggs (all Split Enz alumni), and Michael den Elzen. Rayner left before the first album was released.

In 1988 the members of Schnell Fenster collaborated with Wendy Matthews, Michael Harris, Louis McManus, Vika Bull and Lisa Edwards under the name 'Noel's Cowards' for the movie Rikky and Pete.

Crombie has released one solo single, "My Voice Keeps Changing on Me", in 1983 while Split Enz took a break. Tim Finn was the only other band member to have a solo release during this break. According to Crombie he had to either release the single or pay for the studio time.

In 1996, Crombie assisted Crowded House by designing the stage set design for their final concert, Farewell to the World at the Sydney Opera House.

Crombie lives with his wife Sally whom he works with as a freelance designer. They designed the set for ABC-TV's musical quiz program Spicks and Specks.

== Bibliography ==
- Chunn, Mike, Stranger Than Fiction: The Life and Times of Split Enz, GP Publications, 1992. ISBN 1-86956-050-7
- Chunn, Mike, Stranger Than Fiction: The Life and Times of Split Enz, (revised, ebook edition), Hurricane Press, 2013. ISBN 978-0-9922556-3-3
