= Nigel Griggs =

British-born bass guitarist

- Born: Nigel Griggs; 18 August 1949 (age 76); Hatfield, England
- Genres: Rock, pop, funk
- Occupations: Musician, producer, songwriter
- Instruments: Bass guitar, vocals
- Years active: 1968–present

Nigel Griggs (born 18 August 1949) is an English musician, best known as bass guitarist in the band Split Enz. He is the brother of Paul Griggs from the 1970s vocal group Guys 'n' Dolls.

== Biography ==
A professional musician since 1963, Griggs has played in a number of bands, notably The Cortinas and Octopus, 1963–1971, with his brother Paul Griggs.

Nigel Griggs joined Split Enz in 1977 at the same time Neil Finn did, at the recommendation of the band's then-drummer and close friend of Griggs, Malcolm Green. Griggs stayed with the Enz until their 1984 split. His songwriting credits with the band include "Dirty Creature", co-written with Neil Finn and Tim Finn.

After the Enz split, Griggs joined fellow former Enz members Noel Crombie, Eddie Rayner, and Phil Judd in the band Schnell Fenster, alongside guitarist Michael den Elzen .

In 1996, when Crowded House split up and released their greatest hits album Recurring Dream, frontman Neil Finn approached Griggs to put together a collection of the band's greatest live performances, to append selected copies of Recurring Dream.

In 2002, Griggs released a solo album, Sleeper, through the Split Enz fanclub, Frenz of the Enz.

Griggs has participated in most of Split Enz's reunions, but is not part of their 2026 reunion tour.
