= Eddie Rayner =

New Zealand musician (born 1952)

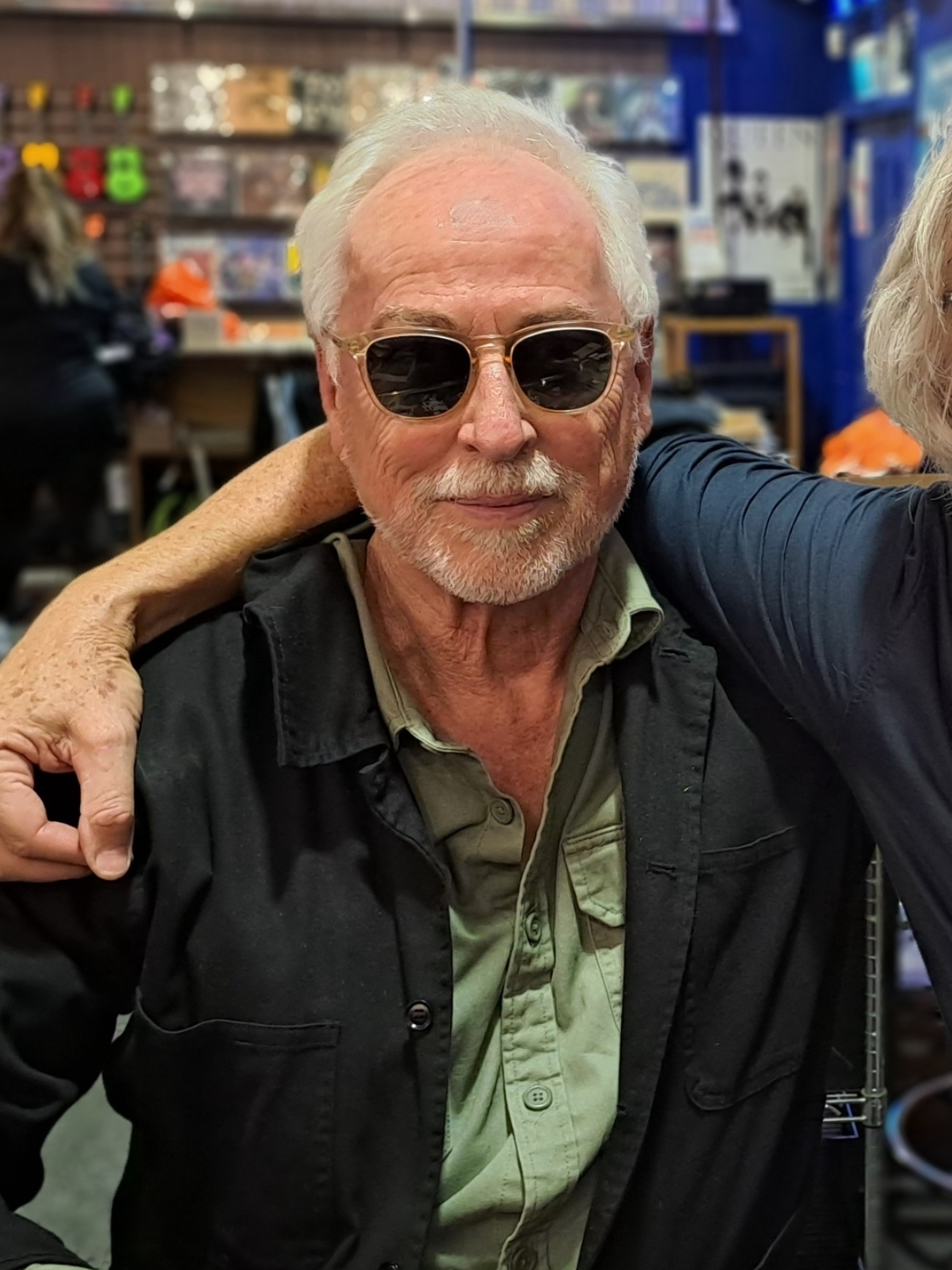
- Rayner in 2023

Background information
- Born: Anthony Edward Charles Rayner; 19 November 1952 (age 74); Lower Hutt, Wellington, New Zealand
- Genres: Rock; pop
- Occupations: Musician; composer; record producer
- Instrument: Keyboards

Anthony Edward Charles Rayner (born 19 November 1952) is a New Zealand musician who spent ten years as a keyboardist in the band Split Enz. He has also played in the groups Orb, Space Waltz, Crowded House, the Makers, The Angels in 1986-1987 and 801.

== Biography ==
Rayner was born in Lower Hutt, New Zealand, in 1952.

Rayner has released two solo albums. The first, Horse, was an instrumental offering released in 1995, recorded entirely at Rayner's home studio in Melbourne, Australia. The second was entitled Play it Straight, a play on a Philip Judd Split Enz song called "Play it Strange" that was a particular favourite of Rayner's during the mid- to late-1970s. The song was not released at the time but was played live when Judd rejoined the band in 1978. Play it Straight consisted of re-arranged and re-recorded versions of material gleaned from other New Zealand composers.

Rayner's keyboard talents were a notable part of the Split Enz sound. Paul McCartney caught one of their shows in 1979 and became a fan of the band, eventually inviting Rayner to play keyboards on his sixth solo album, Press to Play, which was released in 1986. Rayner has also produced material for many artists including Models, Margaret Urlich, Rikki Morris, Margot Smith, and The Exponents, as well as two Enzso recordings with Split Enz members, Dame Kiri Te Kanawa and the New Zealand Symphony Orchestra.

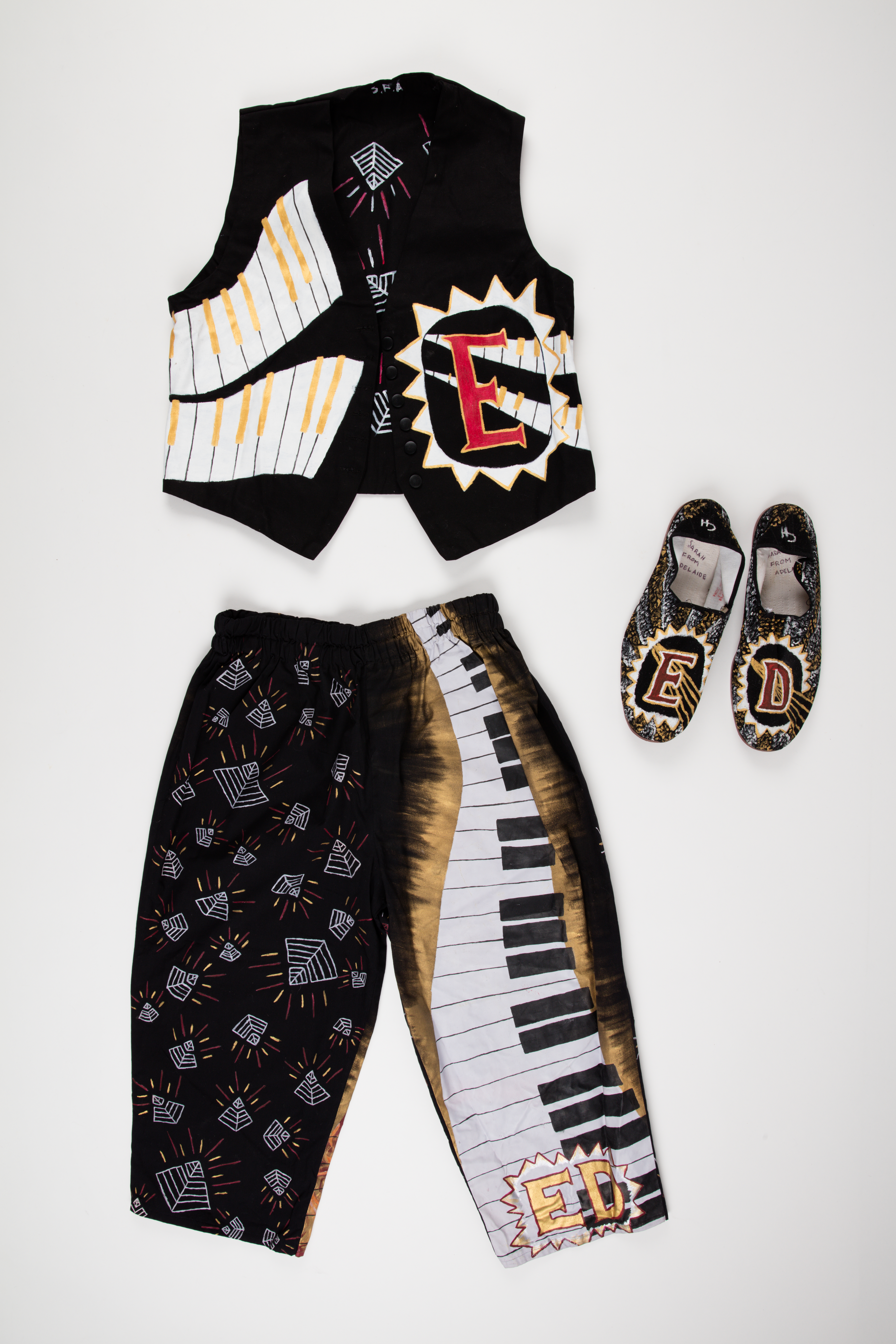
Crowded House stage costume designed by Sarah from Adelaide for Eddie Rayner

During the late 1990s Eddie Rayner decided to take the Split Enz songs to an orchestral setting. This sparked the idea for the Enzso project. Along with his synth, the New Zealand Symphony Orchestra, some Newland Singers and some former members of Split Enz, he created orchestral versions for Split Enz songs. The project ended between late 1999 and early 2000.

Recently he has acted as musical director for television show New Zealand Idol, and participated in reunions of Split Enz and Space Waltz. He is also a member of the 1960s cover band The Con-Rays. He has also recorded with Double Life, whose other members are guitarist Adrian Stuckey, Mark Dennison (sax, flute and clarinet), and drummer Patrick Kuhtze.

In 2022, Rayner collaborated with Tim Finn on a project called Forenzics. The resulting album, Shades and Echoes, used elements from early Split Enz songs combined with Rayner's jams with Double Life.

Rayner has performed Split Enz songs along with other ex-Split Enz members, such as a 2013 tour that included other ex-members Mike Chunn, Geoff Chunn, Emlyn Crowther, and Wally Wilkinson. Vocalists on that tour included The X Factor victor Jackie Thomas, contestant Tom Batchelor, and guest vocalists Annie Crummer, Rima Te Wiata, Rikki Morris and Jesse Sheehan.

Eddie's son Harley Rayner is a member of dub band Mt Eden.

== Instruments ==
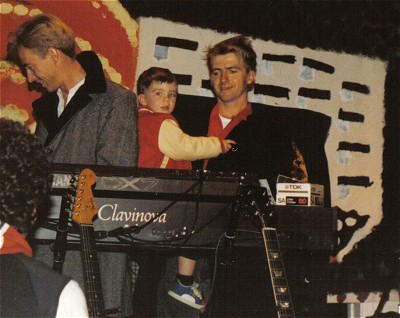
Rayner (left) with Neil Finn holding his son Liam Finn in April 1987 during one of Crowded House's US tours.

During the career of Split Enz, Rayner used a wide, changing array of keyboards. In the band's early progressive rock incarnation keyboards he used included grand piano, organ, clavinet and a Mellotron, but his mainstays during the band's most popular phase were a Yamaha CP-80 electro-acoustic piano, a Yamaha CS-80 synthesizer and a Prophet 5. When he played keyboards for Crowded House on tour during the late 1980s, he was seen to be using a Yamaha DX7 and a Yamaha Clavinova. Later, during Split Enz reunion tours, Rayner used a Yamaha Motif, Ensoniq TS12 and a Clavia Nord Wave.

== See also ==
- Grand Central Band
