= History Never Repeats – The Best of Split Enz =

Greatest hits album by Split Enz
- Released: 1987
- Recorded: 1976–1984
- Genre: Rock
- Length: 39:36 (US, 1987); 57:00 (NZ/AU, 1989); 60:48 (NZ/AU, 2002)
- Labels: Mushroom (Australasia); A&M (international)

Split Enz chronology
The Split Enz Collection 1973-1984 (1986)	History Never Repeats – The Best of Split Enz (1987)	Oddz and Enz (1992)

Professional ratings
Review scores
Source	Rating
AllMusic	4.5/5 stars
Robert Christgau	B−

History Never Repeats – The Best of Split Enz is a compilation of hits by New Zealand rock band Split Enz. Initially released in the US in 1987, then in New Zealand and Australia in 1989, the album has been through many variations and reissues over the years.

== Track listings ==
=== US version (1987) ===
Released by the band's Northern Hemisphere record label A&M Records, this version included the band's hits on the label. It was re-packaged in 2002 as The Best of Split Enz – The Millennium Collection as part of Universal Music's "20th Century Masters" budget-priced series.

No.	Title	Writer(s)	Original album	Length
1.	"I Got You"	Neil Finn	True Colours (1980)	3:31
2.	"Hard Act to Follow"	Tim Finn	Waiata (1981)	3:17
3.	"Six Months in a Leaky Boat"	T. Finn; Split Enz	Time and Tide (1982)	4:27
4.	"What's the Matter with You"	N. Finn	True Colours (1980)	3:08
5.	"One Step Ahead"	N. Finn	Waiata (1981)	2:53
6.	"I See Red"	T. Finn	Frenzy (1979)	3:16
7.	"Message to My Girl"	N. Finn	Conflicting Emotions (1983)	4:02
8.	"History Never Repeats"	N. Finn	Waiata (1981)	3:00
9.	"I Hope I Never"	T. Finn	True Colours (1980)	4:33
10.	"Dirty Creature"	T. Finn; N. Finn; Nigel Griggs	Time and Tide (1982)	4:03
11.	"Poor Boy"	T. Finn	True Colours (1980)	3:26
Total length:				39:36

=== Original NZ/AUS version (1989) ===
The version released in New Zealand and Australia features a different track listing that includes the hits in those two countries.

No.	Title	Writer(s)	Original album	Length
1.	"Give It a Whirl"	Tim Finn; Neil Finn	Frenzy (1979)	2:52
2.	"My Mistake"	T. Finn; Eddie Rayner	Dizrythmia (1977)	3:02
3.	"I See Red"	T. Finn	Frenzy	3:16
4.	"Late Last Night" (single version)	Phil Judd	Second Thoughts (1976)	4:05
5.	"I Got You"	N. Finn	True Colours (1980)	3:29
6.	"Shark Attack"	T. Finn	True Colours	2:57
7.	"Poor Boy"	T. Finn	True Colours	3:24
8.	"I Hope I Never"	T. Finn	True Colours	4:32
9.	"History Never Repeats"	N. Finn	Waiata (1981)	2:59
10.	"One Step Ahead"	N. Finn	Waiata	2:51
11.	"Dirty Creature"	T. Finn; N. Finn; Nigel Griggs	Time and Tide (1982)	4:03
12.	"Pioneer"	Rayner	Time and Tide	1:30
13.	"Six Months in a Leaky Boat"	T. Finn; Split Enz	Time and Tide	4:23
14.	"Strait Old Line"	N. Finn	Conflicting Emotions (1983)	4:00
15.	"Message to My Girl"	N. Finn	Conflicting Emotions	4:00
16.	"Charlie" (live in Auckland, 1984)	T. Finn	Dizrythmia	5:37
Total length:				57:00

=== NZ/AUS reissue (2001) ===
Remastered version with re-sequenced track listing.

No.	Title	Writer(s)	Original album	Length
1.	"History Never Repeats"	Neil Finn	Waiata (1981)	2:59
2.	"Dirty Creature"	N. Finn; Tim Finn; Nigel Griggs	Time and Tide (1982)	4:03
3.	"I See Red"	T. Finn	Frenzy (1979)	3:16
4.	"My Mistake"	T. Finn; Eddie Rayner	Dizrythmia (1977)	3:02
5.	"I Got You"	N. Finn	True Colours (1980)	3:29
6.	"Shark Attack"	T. Finn	True Colours (1980)	2:57
7.	"One Step Ahead"	N. Finn	Waiata (1981)	2:51
8.	"Pioneer"	Rayner	Time and Tide (1982)	1:30
9.	"Six Months in a Leaky Boat"	Tim Finn; Split Enz	Time and Tide (1982)	4:23
10.	"Poor Boy"	T. Finn	True Colours (1980)	3:24
11.	"I Hope I Never"	T. Finn	True Colours (1980)	4:32
12.	"Message to My Girl"	N. Finn	Conflicting Emotions (1983)	4:00
13.	"Strait Old Line"	N. Finn	Conflicting Emotions (1983)	4:00
14.	"Late Last Night"	Phil Judd	Second Thoughts (1976)	4:03
15.	"Charlie" (live in New Zealand 1993)	T. Finn	Dizrythmia (1977)	5:37
16.	"Give It a Whirl"	T. Finn; N. Finn	Frenzy (1979)	2:52
Total length:				56:58

Notes
Track 14: Single version used on original 1989 issue; album version used here.
Track 15: 1984 live version used on original 1989 issue; 1993 live version used here.

=== NZ/AUS 30th anniversary edition (2002) ===
Remastered version with same re-sequenced track listing as 2001 reissue, plus bonus track "I Walk Away" and white cardboard slipcase.

No.	Title	Writer(s)	Original album	Length
1.	"History Never Repeats"	Neil Finn	Waiata (1981)	2:59
2.	"Dirty Creature"	N. Finn; Tim Finn; Nigel Griggs	Time and Tide (1982)	4:03
3.	"I See Red"	T. Finn	Frenzy (1979)	3:16
4.	"My Mistake"	T. Finn; Eddie Rayner	Dizrythmia (1977)	3:02
5.	"I Walk Away"	N. Finn	See Ya 'Round (1984)	3:50
6.	"I Got You"	N. Finn	True Colours (1980)	3:29
7.	"Shark Attack"	T. Finn	True Colours (1980)	2:57
8.	"One Step Ahead"	N. Finn	Waiata (1981)	2:51
9.	"Pioneer"	Rayner	Time and Tide (1982)	1:30
10.	"Six Months in a Leaky Boat"	T. Finn; Split Enz	Time and Tide (1982)	4:23
11.	"Poor Boy"	T. Finn	True Colours (1980)	3:24
12.	"I Hope I Never"	T. Finn	True Colours (1980)	4:32
13.	"Message to My Girl"	N. Finn	Conflicting Emotions (1983)	4:00
14.	"Strait Old Line"	N. Finn	Conflicting Emotions (1983)	4:00
15.	"Late Last Night"	Phil Judd	Second Thoughts (1976)	4:03
16.	"Give It a Whirl"	T. Finn; N. Finn	Frenzy (1979)	2:52
17.	"Charlie" (live in New Zealand 1993)	T. Finn	Dizrythmia (1977)	5:37
Total length:				60:48

Notes
Track 15: Single version used on original 1989 issue; album version used here.
Track 17: 1984 live version used on original 1989 issue; 1993 live version used here.

== Charts ==
Chart performance for History Never Repeats – The Best of Split Enz
Chart (1990)	Peak position
Australian Albums (ARIA)	62
New Zealand Albums (RMNZ)	10
Chart (1996)	Peak position
New Zealand Albums (RMNZ)	9

== Certifications and sales ==
Certifications and sales for History Never Repeats – The Best of Split Enz
Region	Certification	Certified units/sales
Australia (ARIA)	Gold	35,000^{^}
New Zealand (RMNZ)	5× Platinum	75,000^{^}
^{^} Shipments figures based on certification alone.
