= Rear Enz =

Compilation album of rarities by Split Enz
- Released: 1992 (as part of Split Enz 1980–1984 box set)
- Recorded: 1979–1984
- Genre: Art rock, progressive rock, new wave
- Length: 39:11

Split Enz chronology
Oddz and Enz (1992)	Rear Enz (1992)	The Best of Split Enz (1993)

Professional ratings
Review scores
Source	Rating
AllMusic	4.5/5 stars

Rear Enz is a 1992 album of rarities released by New Zealand rock music group Split Enz, comprising b-sides, demos and a non-album single ranging from 1980 to 1984. It was released exclusively as part of the Split Enz 1980–1984 box set, which also includes True Colours, Waiata/Corroboree, Time and Tide, Conflicting Emotions, and See Ya 'Round.

== Track listing ==
1. "Firedrill" (Tim Finn, Neil Finn, Eddie Rayner) - B-side of "Six Months in a Leaky Boat", produced by Hugh Padgham and Split Enz and released May 1982, a gold single - 3:55
2. "Your Inspiration" (Neil Finn) - KAJ Studio Demo recorded at Sing Sing Studios Melbourne April 1984 - 3:49
3. "Parasite" (Tim Finn) - B-side of "Strait Old Line" - Recorded at Paradise Studios Sydney and released October 1983, co-produced by Eddie Rayner and Hugh Padgham - 3:37
4. "Next Exit" (Tim Finn) - Single released March 1983, recorded at AAV Studios Melbourne and never released on a Split Enz album - 3:40
5. "Over Drive" (Rayner) - B-side of "I Walk Away" - An Eddie Rayner instrumental released September 1984, produced and mixed by Split Enz and Jim Barton - 3:43
6. "Serge" (Neil Finn), Recorded at AAV 1984 and produced by Split Enz. Engineered and mixed by Jim Barton - 3:35
7. "In the Wars" (Tim Finn) - B-side of "One Step Ahead", recorded at AAV Melbourne and released November 1980. Produced and engineered by David Tickle - 3:06
8. "Love & Success" (Neil Finn) - KAJ Studio Demo recorded at Sing Sing Studios Melbourne April 1984, the original version of "I Walk Away" - 3:04
9. "Big Heart" (Tim Finn) - KAJ Studio Demo recorded at Sing Sing Studios Melbourne April 1984 - 3:42
10. "Mr. Catalyst" (Tim Finn) - KAJ Studio Demo recorded at Sing Sing Studios Melbourne April 1984 - 3:38
11. "Remember When" (Tim Finn) - B-side of "Next Exit" single, produced by Tim Finn and released March 1983. Recorded at Harlequin Studios New Zealand - 3:15
