= Enz of an Era =

Enz Of An Era

Compilation album by Split Enz
- Released: November 1982
- Recorded: 1976–1982
- Genre: Rock
- Length: 48:12
- Label: Mushroom

Split Enz chronology
Time and Tide (1982)	Enz Of An Era (1982)	Conflicting Emotions (1983)

Enz of an Era was a compilation by New Zealand rock band Split Enz. Released to mark the band's 10th anniversary, and composed of tracks selected by members of the band, the album was released in New Zealand and Australia only. The album was followed up by two "Enz Of An Era" 10th anniversary concerts in early 1983, where the then-current line-up of the band - Tim Finn, Neil Finn, Eddie Rayner, Noel Crombie and Nigel Griggs - were joined by former members Mike Chunn, Rob Gillies and Emlyn Crowther.

== Track listing ==
Side one
No.	Title	Writer(s)	Original release	Length
1.	"History Never Repeats"	Neil Finn	Waiata (1981)	2:58
2.	"My Mistake"	Tim Finn; Eddie Rayner	Dizrythmia (1977)	3:00
3.	"I Got You"	N. Finn	True Colours (1980)	3:29
4.	"Late Last Night"	Phil Judd	Second Thoughts (1976)	4:03
5.	"Poor Boy"	T. Finn	True Colours (1980)	3:27
6.	"Dirty Creature"	N. Finn; T. Finn; Nigel Griggs	Time and Tide (1982)	4:01
7.	"I See Red"	T. Finn	Frenzy (1979)	3:15
Total length:				24:13

Side two
No.	Title	Writer(s)	Original release	Length
8.	"Six Months in a Leaky Boat"	T. Finn; Split Enz	Time and Tide (1982)	3:49
9.	"One Step Ahead"	N. Finn	Waiata (1981)	2:51
10.	"Matinee Idyll (129)"	T. Finn; Judd	Second Thoughts (1976)	2:57
11.	"Another Great Divide"	T. Finn; Rayner; Judd; Robert Gillies	Non-album single (1976)	3:38
12.	"Bold as Brass"	T. Finn; Rayner; Judd; Gillies	Dizrythmia (1977)	3:29
13.	"I Hope I Never"	T. Finn	True Colours (1980)	4:33
14.	"Give It a Whirl"	N. Finn; T. Finn	Frenzy (1979)	2:52
Total length:				24:09 48:12

== Charts ==
=== Weekly charts ===
Chart (1982–83)	Peak position
Australian Album (Kent Music Report)	8
New Zealand Albums (RMNZ)	1

=== Year-end charts ===
Chart (1983)	Position
New Zealand Albums (RMNZ)	32

== Certifications and sales ==
Region	Certification	Certified units/sales
Australia (ARIA)	Platinum	50,000^{^}
New Zealand (RMNZ)	Platinum	15,000^{^}
^{^} Shipments figures based on certification alone.
