= The Living Enz =

Live album by Split Enz
- Released: December 1985
- Recorded: 1982, 1984
- Genre: rock music
- Label: Mushroom Records
- Producers: Eddie Rayner & Nigel Griggs

Split Enz chronology
See Ya 'Round (1984)	The Living Enz (1985)	The Split Enz Collection 1973-1984 (1986)

Professional ratings
Review scores
Source	Rating
Allmusic	2.5/5 stars

The Living Enz was the first live album released by New Zealand rock band Split Enz. Primarily recorded in Melbourne, Australia during the band's 1984 Enz with a Bang farewell tour, it also includes some material from the Auckland shows of that tour, plus recordings from the band's 1982 Time and Tide tour.

== Track listing ==
The track lengths listed on the label of the record itself account only for the lengths of the songs, and do not take into account banter with the crowd and other transitions in between songs. The track runtimes below reflect the full lengths of the tracks.

Disc 1

1. "I Walk Away" (Neil Finn) – 4:43
2. "One Step Ahead" (N. Finn) – 3:34
3. "Bold as Brass" (Tim Finn, Robert Gillies) – 5:34
4. "Ninnie Knees Up" (Noel Crombie) – 3:39
5. "I See Red" (T. Finn) – 4:15
6. "Message to My Girl" (N. Finn) – 4:27
7. "I Hope I Never" (T. Finn) – 4:52
8. "Dirty Creature" (T. Finn, Nigel Griggs, N. Finn) – 5:57
9. "Hard Act to Follow" (T. Finn) – 3:08
10. "Time for a Change" (Phil Judd) – 3:57

Disc 2

1. "Strait Old Line" (N. Finn) – 4:16
2. "Walking Through the Ruins" (T. Finn) – 6:41
3. "Pioneer" (Eddie Rayner) – 2:01
4. "Six Months in a Leaky Boat" (T. Finn, Split Enz) – 5:23
5. "Take a Walk" (N. Finn) – 4:20
6. "Small World" (T. Finn) – 4:57
7. "Lost for Words" (T. Finn, Griggs) – 3:42
8. "Years Go By" (N. Finn, Rayner) – 4:17
9. "Charlie" (T. Finn) – 5:47

== Personnel ==
- Tim Finn: vocals & keyboards
- Neil Finn: guitar & vocals
- Eddie Rayner: keyboards
- Noel Crombie: percussion & drums (Lead vocals on "Ninnie Knees Up") (guitar freak out)
- Nigel Griggs: bass guitar
- Paul Hester: drums & vocals (on all tracks except CD 2 tracks 5, 6 & 7)

== Production ==
- Produced by Eddie Rayner & Nigel Griggs

CD 1

- Recorded at Festival Hall, Melbourne, Australia, November 1984

CD 2
Tracks 1, 2 & 3

- Recorded at Festival Hall, Melbourne, Australia, November 1984

Tracks 5, 6 & 7

- Recorded at Capitol Theatre, Sydney, Australia, July 1982

Tracks 4, 8 & 9

- Recorded at Logan Campbell Centre, Auckland, New Zealand, December 1984

== Charts ==
Chart (1985/86)	Peak position
Australia (Kent Music Report)	88
New Zealand Albums (RMNZ)	9

== Certifications ==
Region	Certification	Certified units/sales
New Zealand (RMNZ)	Gold	7,500^{^}
^{^} Shipments figures based on certification alone.
