= Oddz and Enz =

Oddz And Enz

Compilation album of rarities by Split Enz
- Released: 1992 (as part of Split Enz 1972–1979 box set)
- Recorded: 1975–1979
- Genre: Art rock, progressive rock
- Length: 53:19

Split Enz chronology
History Never Repeats – The Best of Split Enz (1987)	Oddz And Enz (1992)	Rear Enz (1992)

Oddz and Enz is a 1992 album by Split Enz, released exclusively as part of the Split Enz 1972–1979 box set. Composed mainly of live recordings during the Mental Notes period, the album also contains two non-album singles, a b-side and a demo recording. The other albums included in the box set are Mental Notes, Second Thoughts, Dizrythmia, Frenzy, and The Beginning of the Enz.

== Track listing ==
1. "129 (Matinee Idyll)" - Live (Phil Judd, Tim Finn) - Ormond Hall (Reefer Cabaret), Melbourne December 30th 1975 - 3:50
2. "Another Great Divide" (Judd, Finn, Eddie Rayner, Robert Gillies) - Single, January 1977, recorded at Trident Studios UK and released on the Enz of an Era album - 3:36
3. "Lovey Dovey" - Live (Judd, Finn) - Ormond Hall (Reefer Cabaret), Melbourne December 30th 1975, originally released on the A Reefer Derci live LP (various artists) - 3:37
4. "Things" (Neil Finn) - Single, October 1979, never included on any Split Enz album, recorded at Richmond Recorders Melbourne and mixed at AAV - 2:39
5. "Amy (Darling)" - Live (Judd, Finn) - Ormond Hall (Reefer Cabaret), Melbourne December 30th 1975, originally released on the A Reefer Derci live LP - 5:09
6. "Jolted" (Tim Finn) - Demo, Harlequin Studios New Zealand 1978 - 2:35
7. "Under the Wheel" - Live (Judd, Finn) - Ormond Hall (Reefer Cabaret), Melbourne December 30th 1975 - 7:26
8. "Two of a Kind" (Tim Finn) - B-side of "Next Exit" single, recorded at Music Farm Studios NSW 1978. Produced by Tim Finn - 3:40
9. "True Colours (Let's Rock)" - Live (Judd) - Auckland New Zealand 1976, remixed by Eddie Rayner 1992 - 5:57
10. "Nightmare Stampede" - Live (Judd) - Auckland New Zealand 1976, remixed by Eddie Rayner 1992 - 14:39
