= Beginning of the Enz =

Compilation album by Split Enz
- Released: December 1980
- Recorded: 1976–1977
- Genres: Progressive rock, art rock
- Length: 39:28
- Label: Chrysalis

Split Enz chronology
| True Colours (1980) | Beginning of the Enz (1980) | Waiata (1981) |

Beginning of the Enz is a compilation album by New Zealand rock group Split Enz. Released in the UK by Chrysalis Records, it compiles tracks from the albums Second Thoughts (1976) and Dizrythmia (1977), as well as the non-album single "Another Great Divide" (1977). Despite its almost identical title, the album bears a completely different track listing to the 1979 Split Enz album The Beginning of the Enz, which comprised non-album singles and demos from 1973 to 1974.

== Track listing ==
All tracks on side one were originally released on Dizrythmia in 1977, except for "Another Great Divide" as a non-album single in 1976.

All tracks on side two were originally released on Second Thoughts in 1976.

Side one
| No. | Title | Writer(s) | Length |
|---|---|---|---|
| 1. | "My Mistake" | Tim Finn; Eddie Rayner | 2:58 |
| 2. | "Crosswords" | Finn | 3:23 |
| 3. | "Bold as Brass" | Finn; Robert Gillies | 3:27 |
| 4. | "Another Great Divide" | Finn; Rayner; Gillies; Phil Judd | 3:38 |
| 5. | "Charlie" | Finn | 5:28 |
| Total length: | | | 18:54 |

Side two
| No. | Title | Writer(s) | Length |
|---|---|---|---|
| 6. | "Late Last Night" | Judd | 4:02 |
| 7. | "Stranger Than Fiction" | Finn; Judd | 7:06 |
| 8. | "Time for a Change" | Judd | 4:02 |
| 9. | "Walking Down a Road" | Finn; Judd | 5:24 |
| Total length: | | | 20:34 39:28 |
