= A Night in Heaven =

1983 film by John G. Avildsen

- Theatrical release poster
- Directed by: John G. Avildsen
- Written by: Joan Tewkesbury
- Produced by: Gene Kirkwood; Hawk Koch
- Starring: Christopher Atkins; Lesley Ann Warren; Robert Logan
- Cinematography: David L. Quaid
- Edited by: John G. Avildsen
- Music by: Jan Hammer
- Distributed by: 20th Century Fox
- Release date: November 18, 1983
- Running time: 83 minutes
- Country: United States
- Language: English
- Budget: $6 million
- Box office: $5.5 million (US)

A Night in Heaven is a 1983 American romantic drama film directed by John G. Avildsen, starring Christopher Atkins as college student Rick Monroe and Lesley Ann Warren his professor Faye Hanlon. The film's screenplay was written by Joan Tewkesbury. Film critics widely panned the film, but the film itself became better known for Bryan Adams' chart-topping single "Heaven".

== Plot ==
Outspoken and overconfident Rick Monroe is a jock and a popular guy at a community college in Titusville, Florida. At the end of his final report for his class, Rick cracks a joke and his prim and proper speech professor, Faye Hanlon, is not amused. After chiding him for his joke, she decides to flunk him and make him take the course over again.

Faye is going through a slump in her marriage to Whitney Hanlon, a rocket scientist who has just been laid off from NASA. Visiting from Chicago, Faye's free-spirited sister Patsy takes her to a male strip club to cheer her up. The show features a performer called "Ricky the Rocket", who is none other than Faye's student Rick. This is the same place where Rick works on the side as a male stripper to pay for his fees. When he notices Faye in the crowd, he gives her a very special lap dance, kissing her in the process.

The next day, Faye and Rick run into each other at a school function. Initially, Rick is interested only in convincing Faye to allow him another chance at his final and is rebuffed. He realizes that she is attracted to him and begins flirting. Faye arranges to meet Patsy near her hotel, only to discover that she has been deceived into seeing another performance by "Ricky the Rocket".

Since Patsy has to return home a day early, she turns over use of her hotel room to Faye, who calls Whitney and lies that she and Patsy are staying at Patsy's hotel together. Coincidentally, Rick's mother Mrs. Johnson works in the same hotel, and while visiting his mother, Rick runs into Faye again; they return to Faye's room and have sex. Faye must leave and in her absence, Rick invites his girlfriend Slick Ferguson to the room where she has sex with him as well. Faye catches them in the shower and, humiliated, escapes; she realizes that she has been deceived.

Returning home from an unsuccessful job interview, Whitney discovers that Patsy has gone home. Whitney travels to the hotel, where he catches Rick as the latter is exiting. He kidnaps Rick at gunpoint, takes Rick to a skiff at a small dock, and forces him to strip. Rick looks helplessly at Whitney, who gets angry because his orders were not followed exactly, and Rick sobbingly complies. Whitney threatens Rick repeatedly, but ultimately only shoots holes in the skiff, leaving a naked Rick aboard as it sinks in the middle of the river.

Faye returns home to find Whitney waiting for her; she apologizes, and he forgives her. At the end, the couple talk about their problems and resolve them.

== Cast ==
- Christopher Atkins as Rick Monroe
- Lesley Ann Warren as Faye Hanlon
- Robert Logan as Whitney Hanlon
- Deborah Rush as Patsy
- Deney Terrio as Tony
- Sandra Beall as Slick Ferguson
- Alix Elias as Shirley
- Carrie Snodgress as Mrs. Johnson
- Amy Lyndon as Eve
- Joseph Gian as Pete
- Linda Lee Cadwell as Ivy
- Andy García as T.J.

== Production ==
Development on the film began in 1980 at United Artists. The story, which was originally titled Ladies' Night, was conceived by choreographer Deney Terrio and was said to be set in the world of male exotic dancers. In 1981, it was announced Joan Tewkesbury would write the screenplay. As part of her research, Tewkesbury spent time at male strip clubs in Florida. Principal photography was reported to begin in January 1982 in Orlando, but production was delayed until that August with the announcement Nicolas Roeg would helm the film, and 20th Century Fox taking over distribution duties from United Artists. John G. Avildsen replaced Roeg as the director.

Filming began on January 19, 1983, in Orlando and Miami and lasted until late March. The film's title was changed from Ladies' Night to Heaven, the name of the club where Rick Monroe (Christopher Atkins) dances, and was eventually titled A Night in Heaven.

== Soundtrack ==
The original music score is composed by Jan Hammer, and the soundtrack features two songs that would later become huge pop hits. "Heaven", co-written and performed by Bryan Adams, would become Adams' first American number one song on the Billboard Hot 100 when it was re-released in 1985 (it originally charted high on the Mainstream Rock chart shortly after the film's release). In addition, the song "Obsession", performed on the soundtrack by its co-writers, Holly Knight and Michael Des Barres, would be covered and released as a single by the band Animotion on their self-titled album, who turned the song into a top ten hit in early 1985. The film also featured the song "Dirty Creature" by New Zealand/Australian group Split Enz.

== Reception ==
=== Critical response ===
A Night in Heaven received largely negative reviews from critics, who cited its confusing plot and unresolved story lines. Roger Ebert wrote, "I’ve rarely seen a movie with more interior evidence of compromise than A Night in Heaven. You can sit in this brief, unsatisfying feature and put your finger on the places where important scenes are missing. Afterward, you can ask a lot of questions that the movie should have answered." He added the film starts off "by talking about love and fidelity, quitting a job for ethical reasons, and, in the words of the song, looking, for love in all the wrong places", but ultimately "doesn't pay off on any of them".

The film's incoherent narrative and abrupt character turns led critics to surmise that the film underwent significant cuts or changes during production. Ebert argued, "The director, John Avildsen, is a serious and good director; his credits include Rocky, Joe, Save the Tiger and Neighbors. It is impossible to believe this is the movie he wanted to make." In addition, he called attention to the mismarketing of the movie and how it "plays up the sex angle", though the film comes to focus more on the Hanlons' marital woes and Whitney (Robert Logan)'s midlife crisis. In his review, Vincent Canby of The New York Times wrote "all boredom breaks loose", and similarly to Ebert, posited "whether what is on the screen is what [Tewkesbury] wrote".

Tim Brayton of Alternate Ending wrote, "Avildsen is not without an eye for capturing the sweaty fatigue of environments, and that trick serves him well at multiple points throughout this movie, but it’s mostly just spackling a respectable gloss on a tawdry scenario in a tawdry milieu." He concluded: "it’s an outright joke to pretend that we can cobble together the dog-ends of ignored subplots into a treatise on economic tension in the early years of the Reagan presidency. It’s not sordid enough to be decent junk...and other than offering the unusual sight of male objectification in a Hollywood studio picture, there’s nothing about it that justifies so much as a sidelong glance."

Though the film was mostly maligned, the scene where Faye Hanson (Lesley Ann Warren) encounters Rick at the strip club was described as "a scene of considerable erotic effectiveness" by Ebert. Brayton praised Warren's performance and said the scene is "the most human, interesting material in the film, and it’s largely wasted, but Warren deserves a lot of credit for the effort."

In an interview, Tewkesbury admitted producers made numerous changes to her script. Avildsen later said the narrative incoherence came from his desire for the film to be about marital forgiveness after infidelity, but Tewkesbury was unable to write the scenes that would emphasize this message. He said the film "was really terrible. I knew it... I have absolutely no defense for it. I'd almost be willing to give people their money back."

Audiences polled by CinemaScore gave the film an average grade of "D+" on an A+ to F scale.

=== Box office ===
The film was a box-office bomb, grossing just over $5.5 million on a $6 million budget.

=== Accolades ===
Atkins won the 1983 Golden Raspberry Award for Worst Actor at the 4th Golden Raspberry Awards.

== Bibliography ==
- Powell, Larry; Garrett, Tom (2013). "A Night in Heaven". The Films of John G. Avildsen: Rocky, The Karate Kid and Other Underdogs. McFarland. pp. 124–130. ISBN 978-0786490479.
