= Obsession (Michael Des Barres & Holly Knight song) =

1983 song by Holly Knight and Michael Des Barres

Single by Michael Des Barres & Holly Knight

from the album A Night in Heaven
- B-side: "A Woman's Weapon"
- Released: November 1983 (first release); 1984 (re-release)
- Recorded: 1983
- Genre: Synth-pop; new wave
- Length: 5:44 (extended version); 3:56 (single/album version); 2:50 (video version)
- Label: A&M
- Songwriters: Holly Knight; Michael Des Barres
- Producer: Mike Chapman

Music video
- "Obsession" Video on YouTube

"Obsession" is a 1983 song by Holly Knight and Michael Des Barres, written and recorded in 1983. This version was played in the romantic drama film A Night in Heaven (1983), during a scene in which Christopher Atkins bumps and grinds in Lesley Ann Warren's face in sync with the rhythm of the song. The song was featured on the film's soundtrack and was also featured in the theatrical trailer to the erotic romantic drama film 9½ Weeks (1986), starring Mickey Rourke and Kim Basinger.

== Background ==
In 1983, co-writer Michael Des Barres, who was recovering from a heroin addiction, wanted to write a song about obsession that would appeal to a broad audience, and he decided to focus on romantic obsession instead of drug addiction. His producer Mike Chapman arranged for him to collaborate with Holly Knight, who was also signed to Chapman's publishing company. The lines "Like a butterfly, a wild butterfly / I will collect you and capture you" were inspired by The Collector (1965), a psychological horror film that Des Barres had watched about a man who kidnaps a beautiful woman. Knight would often practice or write riffs on the bass E-string of her guitar, which spawned the bass rhythm of "Obsession".

== Animotion version ==
"Obsession"
- U.S. 7-inch vinyl

Single by Animotion

from the album Animotion
- B-side: "Turn Around"
- Released: October 1984
- Genre: Synth-pop; new wave
- Length: 5:34 (album version); 3:58 (single version)
- Label: Mercury
- Producer: John Ryan

Animotion singles chronology
"Obsession" (1984)	"Let Him Go" (1985)

Music video
- "Obsession" on YouTube

The Los Angeles-based synth-pop band Animotion recorded a version of the tune for their eponymous debut studio album, released in 1984 as an album track and the first single in 1985. This version became a success, and it remains Animotion's biggest hit. It became a worldwide success and the band's first US Billboard Hot 100 top-ten single, peaking early the following year after being remixed to sound more like its predecessor from 1983.

Animotion's version is included in the 2002 video game Grand Theft Auto: Vice City on the fictional in-game new wave radio station "Wave 103" as well as in a strip club in the game called "The Pole Position Club". It has also been used as the theme song for World Wrestling Federation's Saturday Night's Main Event (aired on NBC as the introduction theme from May 1985–Jan 1988) and Fashion Television Channel, as well as MTV's House of Style. The song has been used as the opening theme for the internationally syndicated Canadian program FT – FashionTelevision since it premiered in 1986. The Animotion version was also featured in 1985 episodes of the daytime soap operas Days of Our Lives and Guiding Light. It also featured in the 2016 video game Call of Duty: Infinite Warfare as a part of the soundtrack to the zombies mode map "Zombies in Spaceland".

The song is featured in the 1989 video Don Cherry's Rock'em Sock'em Hockey.

It was also featured prominently in the 2018 Australian film The Second, the first feature film ever produced by an Australian streaming service (Stan). The movie, about a troubling incident in the past of a successful novelist, used the song throughout to highlight the themes of jealousy, envy, and most obviously obsession.

The song features in the American Dad! episode "Shell Game" (2018).

Various artists have covered the song, including the Azoic in 2004 and the Sugababes. Karen O from the Yeah Yeah Yeahs recorded a version that was used as the theme song for the drama television miniseries Flesh and Bone.

The song is featured in a scene in the horror thriller film Fresh (2022), in which Sebastian Stan's character dances to the song while preparing human meat for consumption.

The song is used in a teaser trailer for the Ti West film MaXXXine (2024).

The WWE (formerly World Wrestling Federation) used the song again as its introduction theme for the returning Saturday Night's Main Event which aired via simulcast on NBC and Peacock on December 14, 2024.

The music video features the Animotion band members—focusing mostly on the two lead vocalists, Bill Wadhams and Astrid Plane—dressed in various costumes (such as Mark Antony and Cleopatra) while lip-syncing and dancing to the song next to a swimming pool and inside Castillo del Lago, a luxury house in the Hollywoodland neighborhood of Beachwood Canyon in Hollywood, California.

== Music video ==
The music video features the duo lip-syncing while clips intersperse from the film A Night in Heaven. The clips mostly show the two characters Rick (Christopher Atkins) and Faye (Lesley Ann Warren) dancing and flirting in the clips.

== Track listings ==
=== Michael Des Barres & Holly Knight ===
12" release (A&M Records, AMX 183)

1. "Obsession" - 5:40
2. "A Woman's Weapon" - 3:50

7" release (A&M Records, AM 183)

1. "Obsession" - 3:50
2. "A Woman's Weapon" - 3:50

=== Animotion ===
12"
Mercury / 880 266-1 (US), PH3412 (UK)

1. "Obsession (Dance Remix)" - 6:00
2. "Obsession (Special Dub Mix)" - 5:30

7" release (Mercury / 880 266-7)

1. "Obsession" - 3:58
2. "Turn Around" - 3:54

=== Sugababes ===
1. "Obsession" - 3:51

== Charts ==
=== Weekly charts ===
Weekly chart performance for "Obsession"
Chart (1985)	Peak position
Australia (Kent Music Report)	12
Austria (Ö3 Austria Top 40)	17
Belgium (Ultratop 50 Flanders)	34
Canada Top Singles (RPM)	7
Europe (European Top 100 Singles)	10
Europe (European Airplay Top 50)	15
Ireland (IRMA)	6
Netherlands (Dutch Top 40 Tipparade)	13
Netherlands (Single Top 100)	42
New Zealand (Recorded Music NZ)	10
South Africa (Springbok Radio)	9
UK Singles (Official Charts)	5
US Billboard Hot 100	6
US 12-inch Singles Sales (Billboard)	3
US Dance/Disco Club Play (Billboard)	35
US Cash Box Top 100 Singles	6
West Germany (GfK)	8

Weekly chart performance for "I Engineer" / "Obsession" (remix)
Chart (1986)	Peak position
US 12-inch Singles Sales (Billboard)	22
US Dance/Disco Club Play (Billboard)	27

=== Year-end charts ===
Year-end chart performance for "Obsession"
Chart (1985)	Position
Australia (Kent Music Report)	77
Canada Top Singles (RPM)	59
UK Singles (Gallup)	73
US Billboard Hot 100	56
US 12-inch Singles Sales (Billboard)	14
US Cash Box Top 100 Singles	53
West Germany (GfK)	69

== Sugababes version ==
"Obsession"

Song by Sugababes

from the album Taller in More Ways
- Recorded: 10 October 2005
- Studio: D.A.R.P. Studios, Atlanta & Home Recordings; (London, England)
- Genre: Electronic rock; synth-pop
- Length: 3:52
- Label: Island
- Songwriters: Holly Knight; Michael Des Barres
- Producer: Dallas Austin

English girl group Sugababes covered "Obsession" for their fourth studio album Taller in More Ways (2005). Group member Heidi Range initially recorded it as a demo with Ashley Hamilton, although the Sugababes later decided to record it as a group. It was produced by Dallas Austin, one of the album's primary producers. The cover is similar to the original and had a polarizing effect on critics; some criticised it as mediocre, while others called it one of the album's standout tracks. The Sugababes performed it on their tours in support of Taller in More Ways and Overloaded: The Singles Collection (2006).

=== Background and production ===
The Sugababes' version of "Obsession" was produced by Dallas Austin, who collaborated with the Sugababes on various tracks on the album. Group member Heidi Range initially recorded "Obsession" as a demo with Ashley Hamilton, although the Sugababes later decided to record it as a group. They spoke to Austin about their desire to record the song, and according to Range, "he was made up, because it’s one of his favourite songs." "Obsession" was mixed by Jeremy Wheatley at TwentyOne Studios, London, with assistance from Richard Edgeler. It was engineered collectively by Rick Shepphard, Graham Marsh (producer), Ian Rossiter and Owen Clark. Tony Reyes provides background vocals for the song. "Obsession" was recorded at DARP Studios, in Atlanta & Home Recordings, London. It derives from the genres of synthpop and electronic rock. K. Ross Hoffman of AllMusic described it as "sugary synth pop". Talia Kraines of BBC called the cover an "exact reworking" of the original. The instrumentation consists of an electric guitar, bass guitar, drums and keys. Alex Roginski of the Sydney Morning Herald noted that the song "thumps out analog synth and the glittering chord progressions of a 1980s nightclub".

=== Critical reception ===
The Sugababes' cover of "Obsession" had a polarizing effect on critics. Harry Rubenstein of The Jerusalem Post felt that the group added nothing new to the track and instead stuck to a "straight up" cover, which he considered disappointing. Nick Southall of Stylus Magazine regarded it as a "pleasant but unspectacular cover". A journalist from The Scotsman considered it a "less engaging non-song" and criticized the group's decision to cover it. Alexis Petridis of The Guardian felt that the Sugababes' version "sands off the edges rather than amps up the lunacy", and concluded: "what's left is like 1980s night at karaoke". On the positive side, BBC's Talia Kraines named it the album's standout pop track. Similarly, Peter Robinson of The Observer described the "spirited gambol" as one of the album's highlights. Anna Britten from Yahoo! Music thought that the cover was even better than the original, and appreciated the "gorgeous, perfumed menace on the song's subject" which she felt resembled Sin City's "gun-toting Valkyrie-hookers". Simon Price of The Independent praised the song as "instant pop", and a writer from The Liverpool Daily Post & Echo considered it a "brilliantly seductive reworking" of the original.

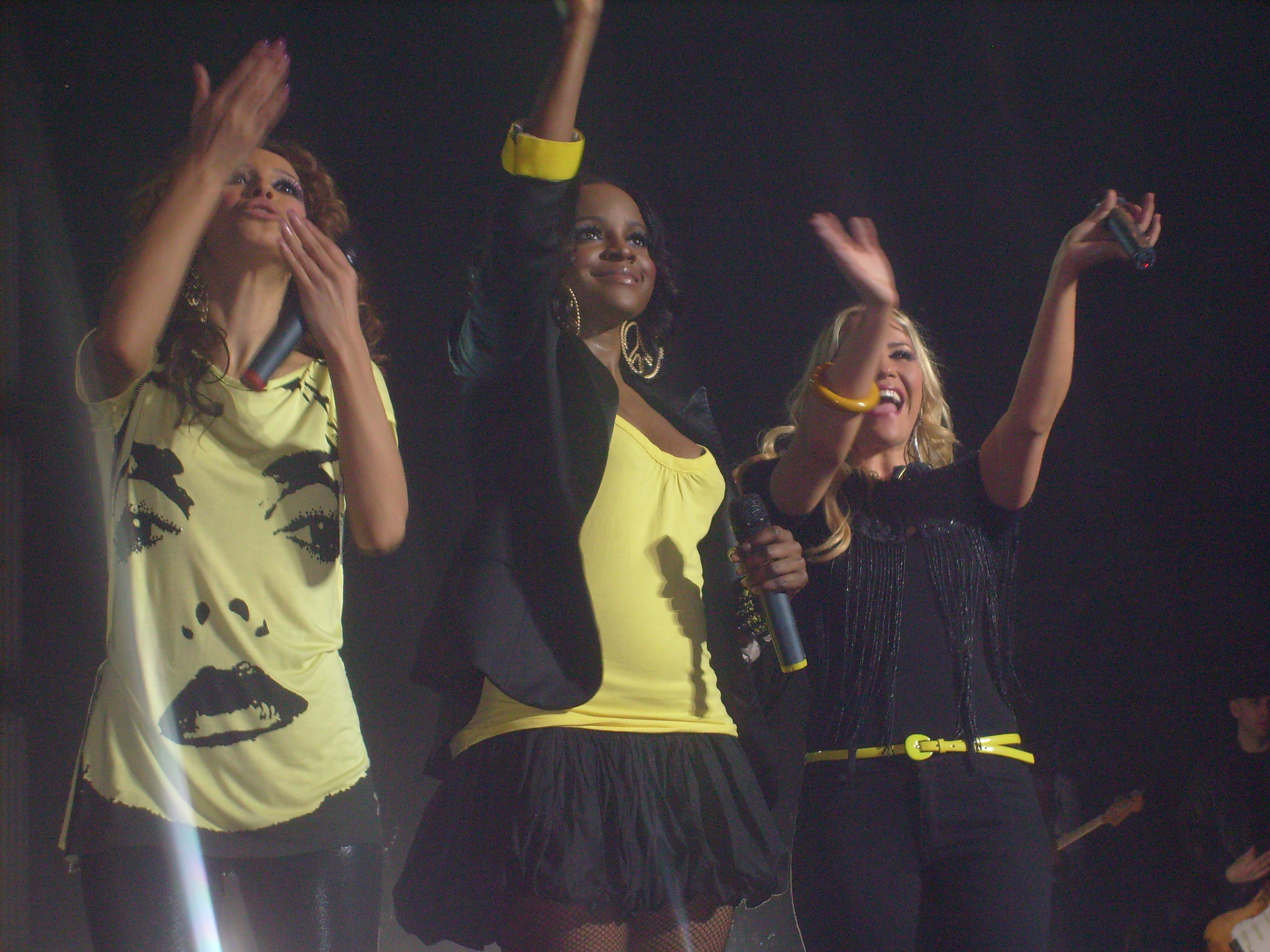
The Sugababes performed "Obsession" on the tours for Taller in More Ways and Overloaded.

=== Live performances ===
"Obsession" was included in the set list for the Sugababes' tour supporting Taller in More Ways. It was one of three tracks from the album that was not released as a single to be performed on the tour. Gurdip Thandi of Birmingham Mail regarded the song's performance at the NIA Academy as "polished". "Obsession" was also included in the set list for their 2007 tour in support of Overloaded: The Singles Collection, the group's 2006 greatest hits album.

=== Credits and personnel ===
Recording

- Recorded at DARP Studios, Atlanta & Home Recordings, London

Personnel

- Songwriting – Holly Knight, Michael Des Barres
- Production – Dallas Austin
- Engineering – Rick Shepphard
- Assistant recording engineering – Graham Marsh (producer), Ian Rossiter, Owen Clark
- Mixing – Jeremy Wheatley for 365 Artists at TwentyOne Studio, London
- Guitar and bass guitar – Tony Reyes
- Drums and keys – Dallas Austin
- Background vocals – Tony Reyes

Credits adapted from the liner notes of Taller in More Ways, Universal Island Records.
