= Royal Herbert Hospital =

- Royal Army Medical Corps
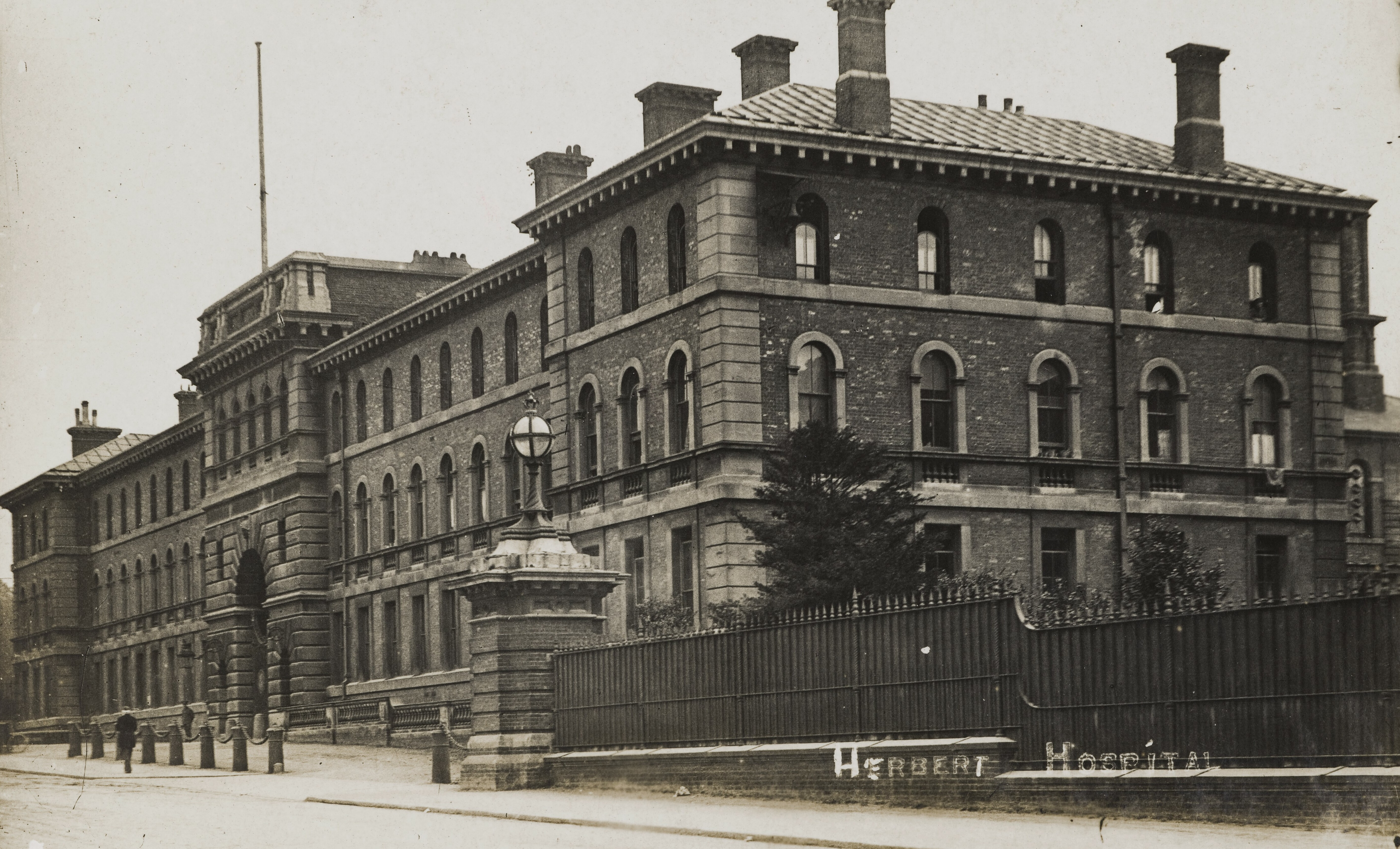
- Royal Herbert Hospital: the gatehouse block

- Location within Greenwich

Geography
- Location: Shooter's Hill, London, England, United Kingdom
- Coordinates: 51.4708°N 0.0507°E

Organisation
- Care system: Military

History
- Founded: 1865
- Closed: 1977

Links
- Lists: Hospitals in England

Initially the Herbert Hospital, renamed in 1900, the Royal Herbert Hospital was built as a restorative facility for British veterans of the Crimean War, and remained a military hospital until 1977. It was situated in southeast London, on the south side of Woolwich Common, on the western slopes of Shooter's Hill, in the Royal Borough of Greenwich. Today the former hospital buildings form a residential development known as the Royal Herbert Pavilions.

== History ==
The hospital was built on the authority of Sidney Herbert, responsible for sending Florence Nightingale to the Crimea, leader of War Office reforms after this campaign, and passionate about health care and reducing military mortality rates from diseases and ill-treated war wounds. Designed by chief architect Sir Douglas Galton (of the Royal Engineers), the hospital is notable for the design inputs of Nightingale (Galton's aunt and his cousin by marriage). It opened on 1 November 1865 and in the following year Jane Catherine Shaw Stewart, Nightingale's colleague, became responsible for the nurses until she was obliged to stand down after accusations of bullying.

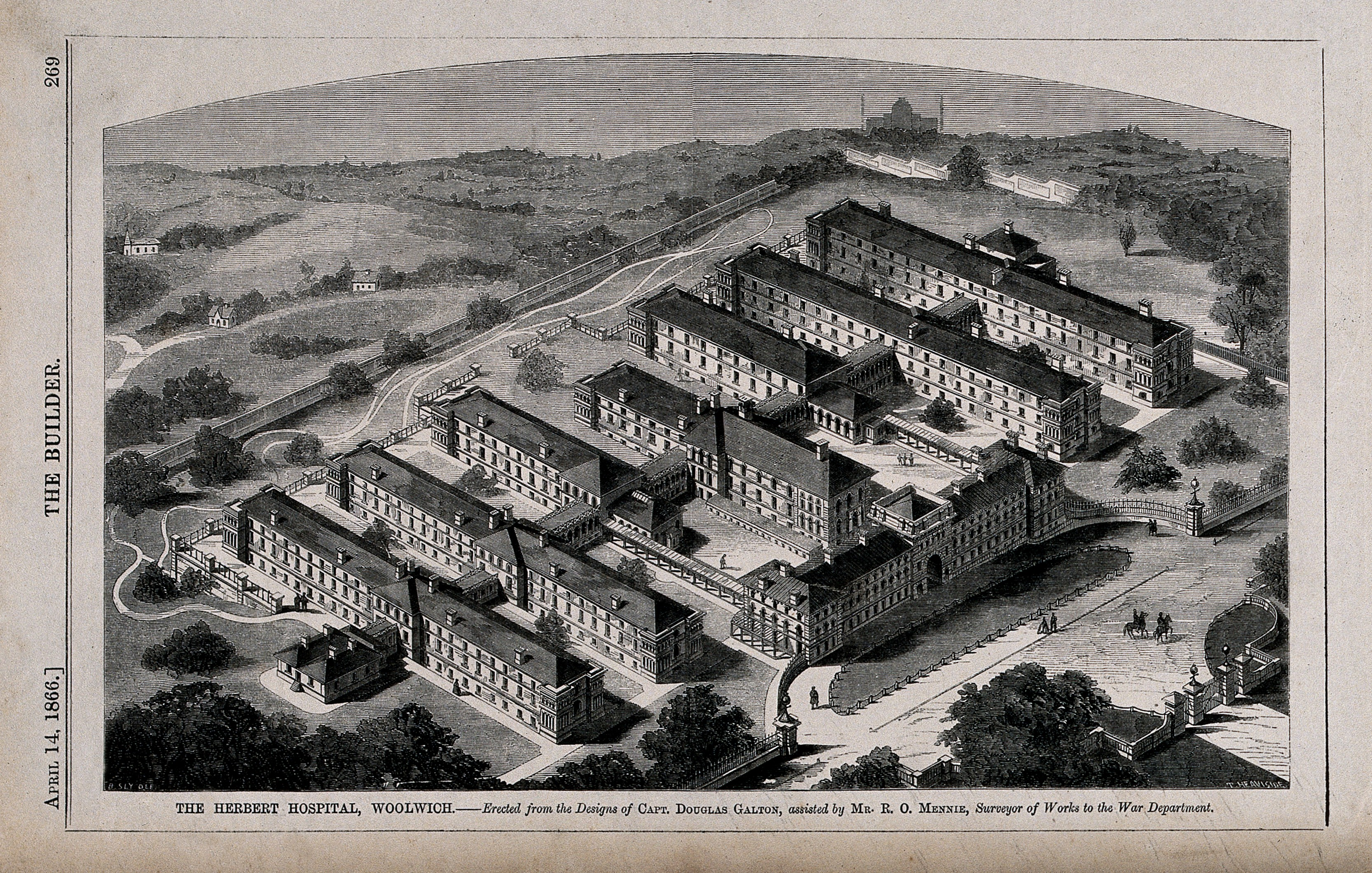
Aerial view showing pavilion layout, 1866

It utilised a new approach to open planning, and was based on the revolutionary 'pavilion' design whereby each ward was connected to a central corridor to maximise daylight and fresh air intake. Nightingale explained:

"All the wards are raised on basements, those at the lower end of the ground are so lofty as to afford excellent accommodation… Every ward has a large end window, commanding beautiful views."

Enclosed in 19 acres of landscaped gardens, and sitting adjacent to Woolwich Common and the ancient Oxleas Woods, the hospital quickly became a design figurehead for dozens more hospitals, both public and military. The revolutionary construction methods included the use of cavity wall construction, fireproof floors, and a system for heating incoming fresh air. Proving an appropriate response to Nightingale's reflection that:

"no ward is in any sense a good ward in which the sick are not at all times supplied with pure air, light and a due temperature. These are the results to be obtained from hospital architecture."

The building work of the hospital cost £209,139 and the land purchase was £6,394.

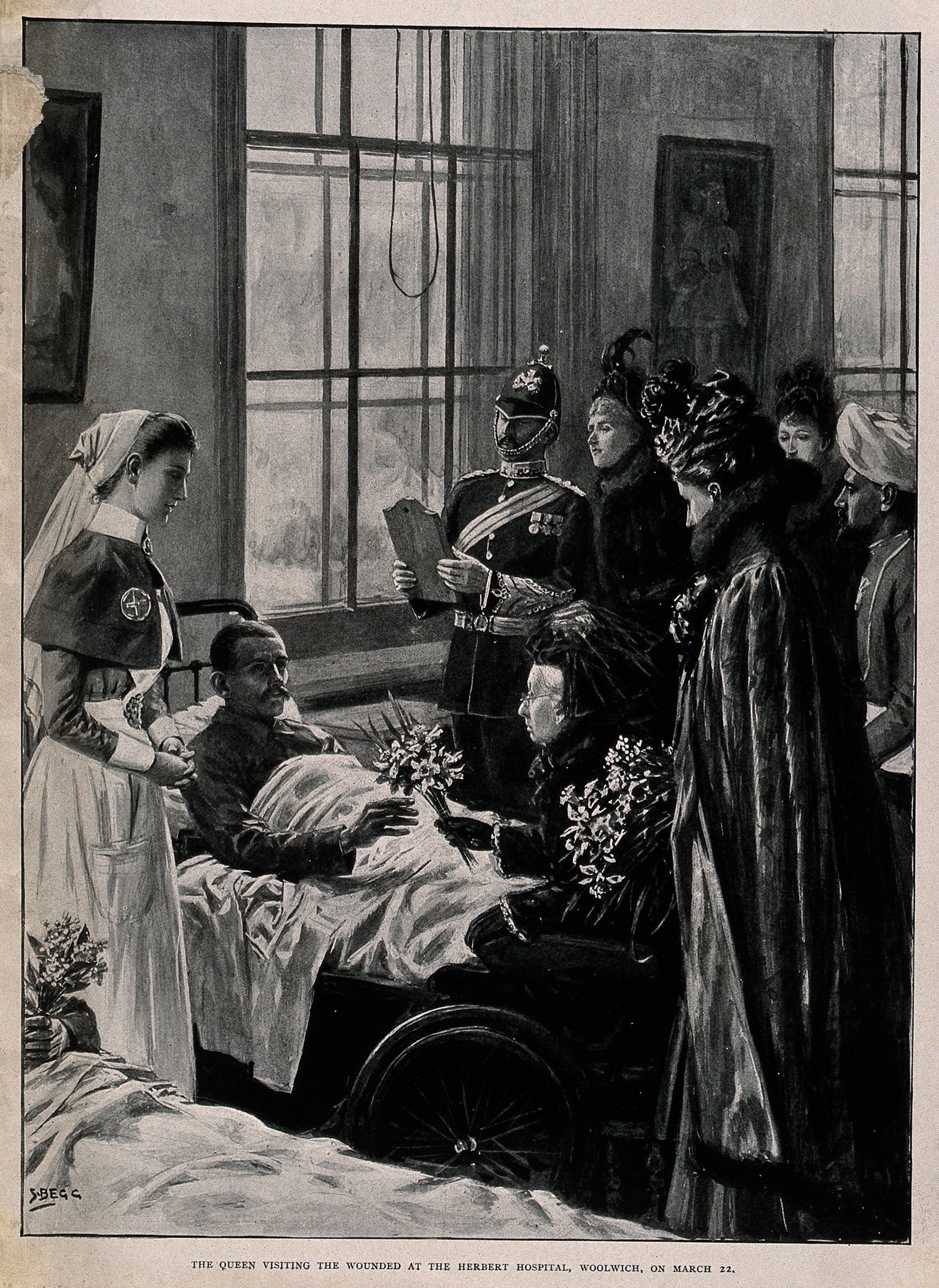
Queen Victoria's visit in March 1900

The hospital was considered to be such a leap forward in design and patient treatment that a new Commission of 1883 congratulated it as "one of the best of the modern great hospitals". In 1900 Queen Victoria visited soldiers in the hospital who had been injured in the Boer War, and granted her Royal Patronage. Three years later, in 1903, King Edward VII and Queen Alexandra visited when the queen opened a new nursing department.

== World War service ==
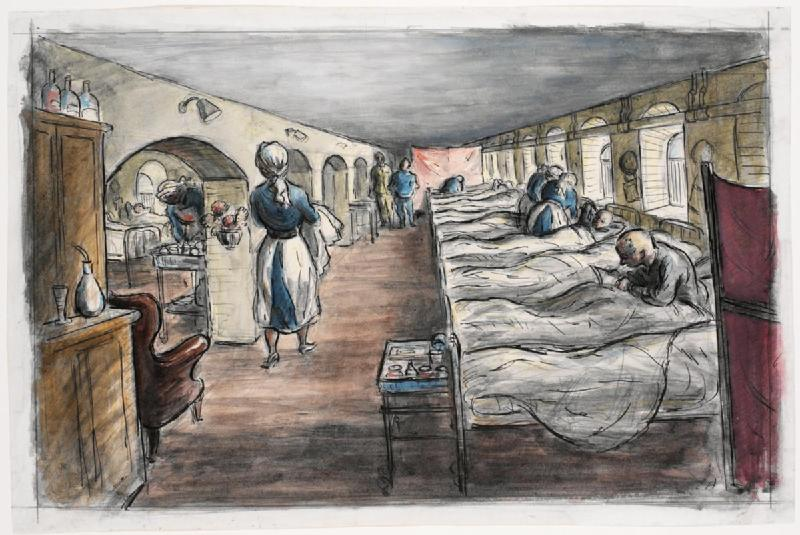
Basement Ward, 1941: watercolour by official war artist Edward Ardizzone

The Royal Herbert Hospital was actively involved in the care of the wounded from the First World War and the Second World War. During the first, it was the location of Enid Bagnold's A Diary Without Dates when Bagnold was a V.A.D. there. During World War Two, the Royal Herbert Military Hospital admitted civilian patients when the nearby Royal Arsenal was bombed by the German Luftwaffe. Any downed pilots and navigators were taken as prisoners of war (POWs) and treated for their injuries at the Royal Herbert, where a separate Luftwaffe officers and NCOs ward was set up.

The hospital provided orthopaedic, general surgical and medical wards for army personnel and their families. At its peak the hospital had 15 wards which accommodated 650 beds. This included a guardroom and prison ward for 28 army prisoners.

== Closure and redevelopment ==
Before it closed the hospital had become the Army's main orthopaedic centre and contained the Army schools for physiotherapy, x-rays, and medical clerks' and nurses' preliminary training. The hospital closed in 1977 and for a period of time became derelict.

In 1986, American new wave band Animotion filmed the music video for their single "I Engineer" and Kate Bush filmed the video for "Experiment IV" in the then abandoned hospital.

Demolition was thought likely, but as a Grade II listed building in the Woolwich Common Conservation Area it was preserved. In 1990, the empty and disused site was purchased by a property developer and developed into 228 luxurious flats and apartments called the Royal Herbert Pavilions. Completed in 1995, today's site incorporates a leisure club, private bar, tennis courts, swimming pool and outdoor nature reserve.

Opposite the hospital, the Royal Army Medical Corps Officers' Mess was built in 1909; renamed Victoria House, it was sold by the Ministry of Defence in 2013.

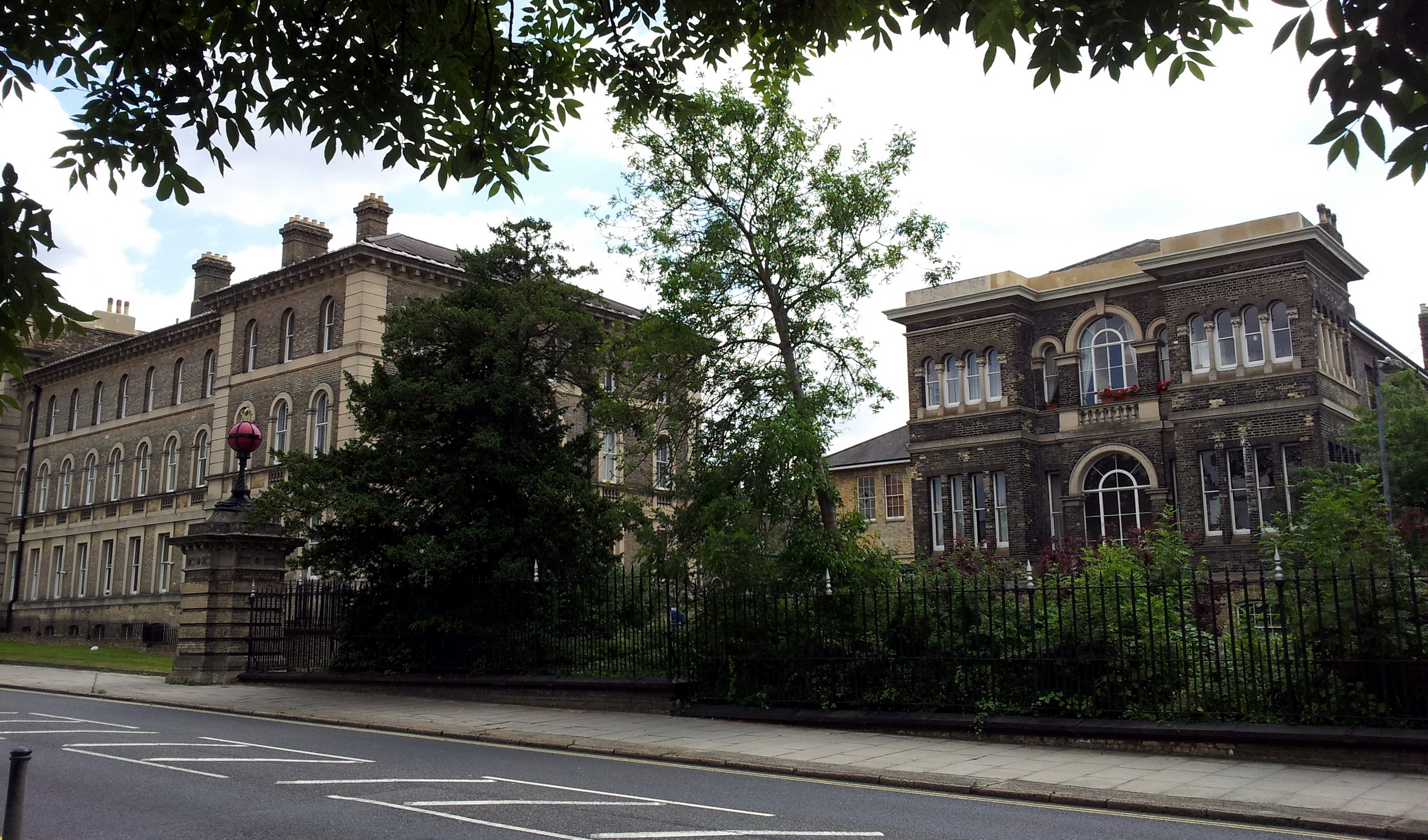
Shooters Hill Road façade

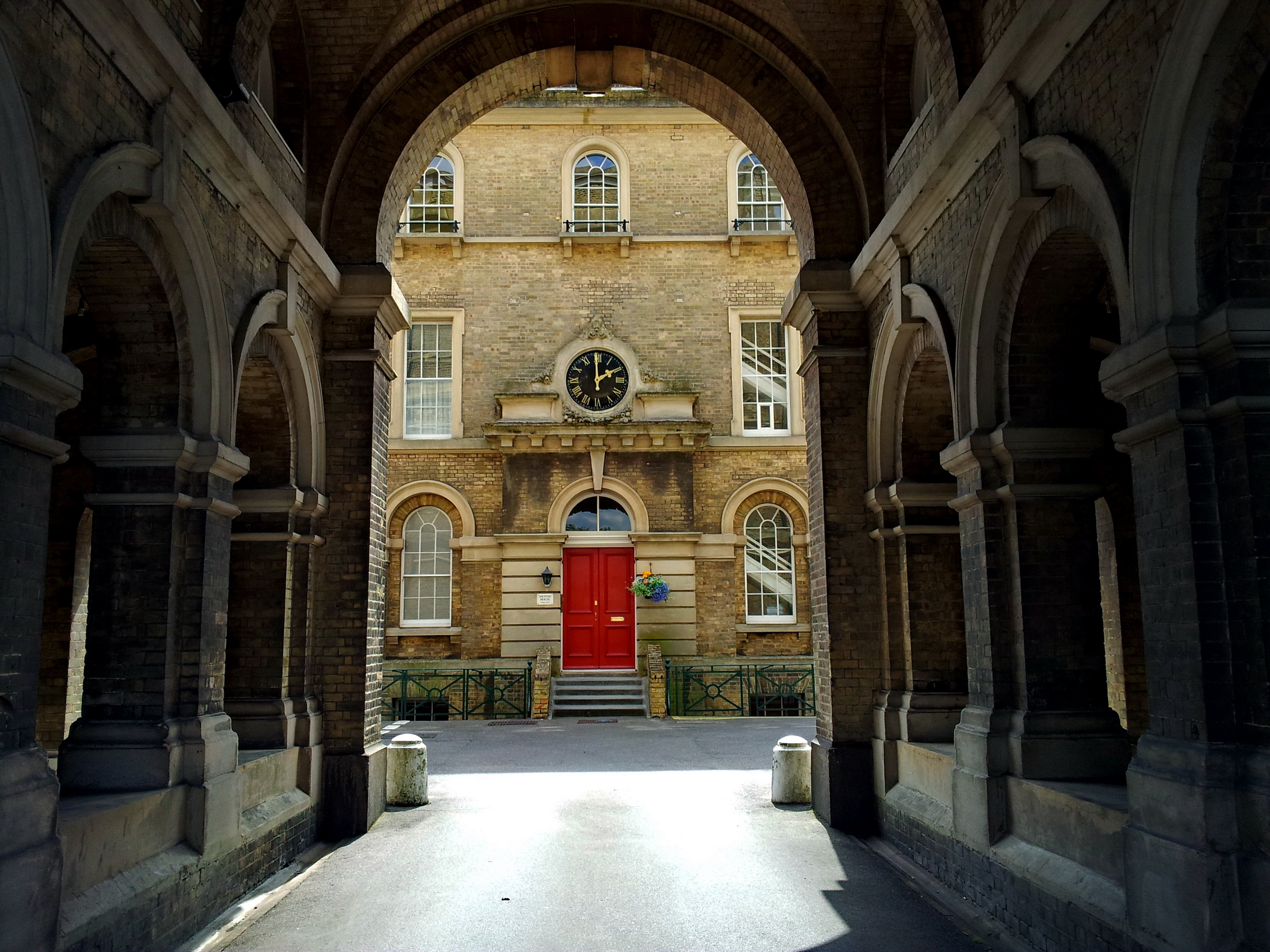
Main entrance gate

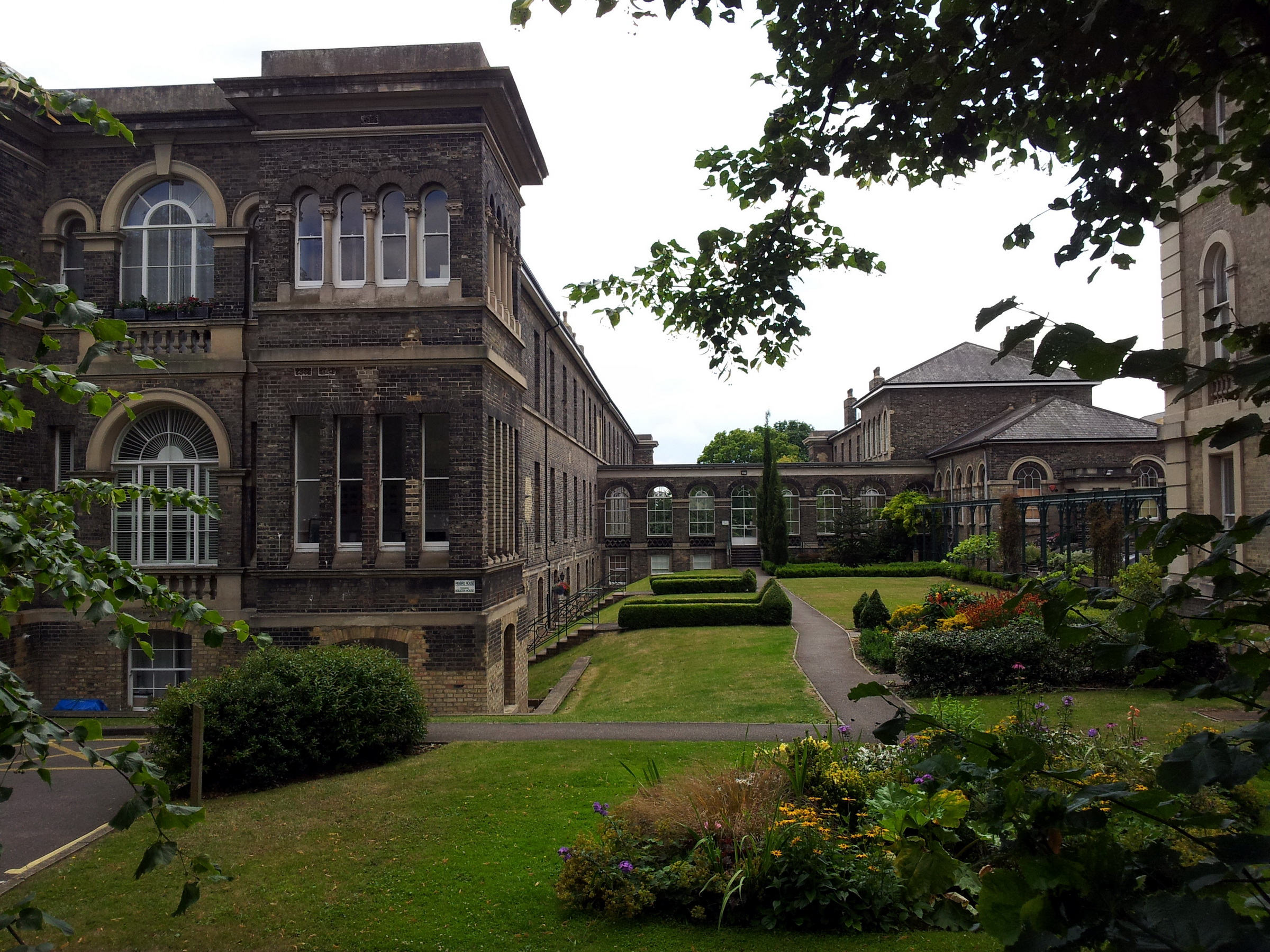
Pavilions and gardens

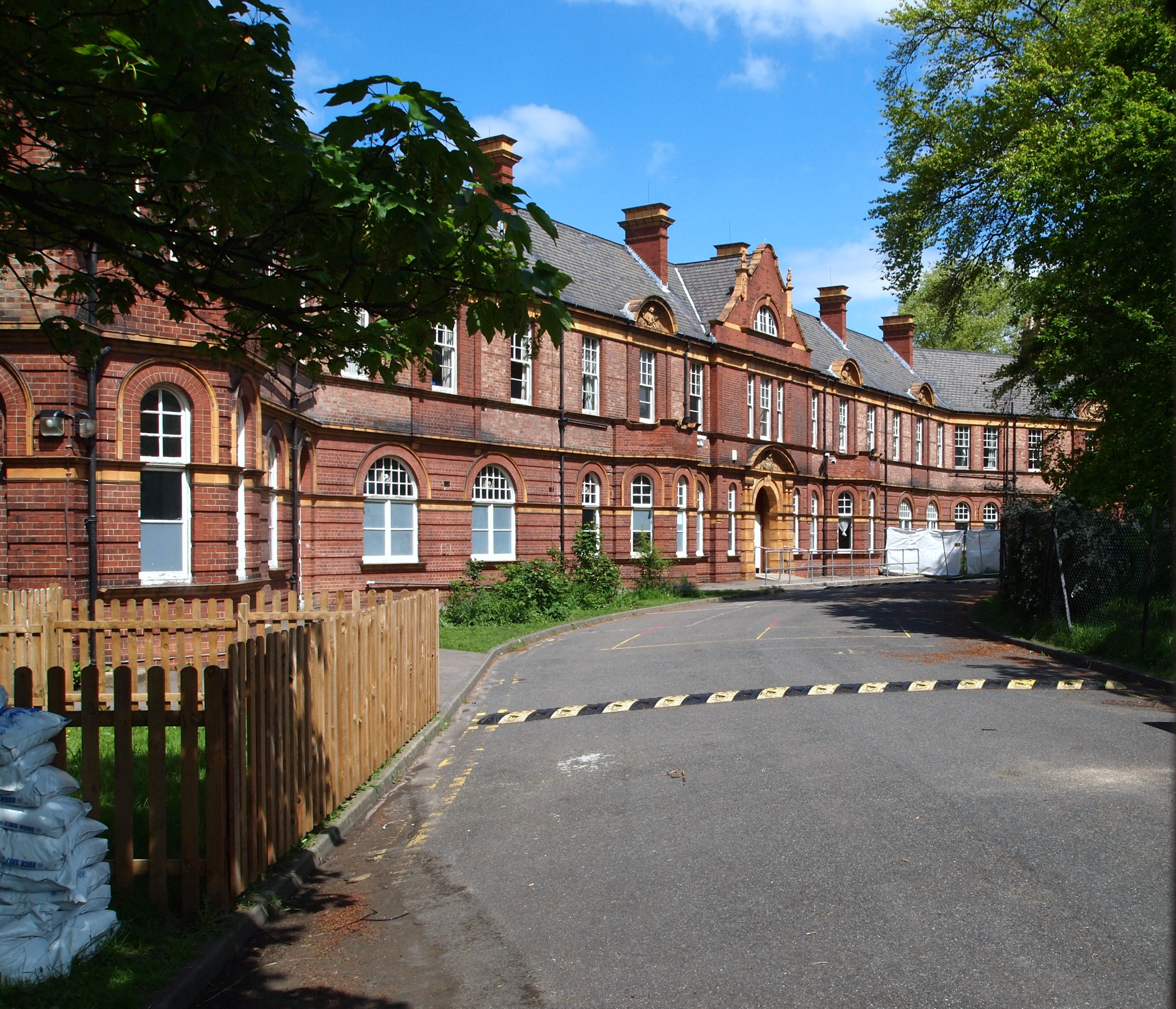
Victoria House
