= FashionTelevision =

Television series

- Also known as: FT
- Genre: Magazine Format
- Created by: Jay Levine
- Starring: Jeanne Beker
- Theme music composer: Animotion
- Opening theme: "Obsession"
- Country of origin: Canada
- Original language: English

Production
- Producer: Howard Brull
- Editors: Luke McCarty, Tharanga Ramanayake
- Running time: 22 mins
- Production company: CHUM Limited

Original release
- Network: Citytv (1985–2007); CTV / Fashion Television (2008–2012)
- Release: 1985 – 2012

FashionTelevision, also known as FT, is a Canadian-produced special interest show focusing on fashion. The show, created by Jay Levine in 1985, was last hosted by Jeanne Beker. Production of the broadcast ended on April 11, 2012.

The program was originally a local production of CITY-TV Toronto, the original Citytv station. Its popularity there led it to eventually be carried across Canada on various channels owned by CHUM Limited, the station's owner, later spawning its own specialty cable channel, Fashion Television. The show was also broadcast in syndication for many years on VH1, E! and sister network style in the United States, and it continues to air in many parts of Europe, making Beker a very recognizable person in the fashion world.

The show's theme song was "Obsession" by the group Animotion.

CTV's parent company, CTVglobemedia, bought out CHUM in June 2007. CityTV, which remained the nominal producer of the show throughout its history, was sold to Rogers Communications; however, because CTVglobemedia kept the spin-off channel, it was also entitled to the rights to the show itself. FT's terrestrial broadcasts moved from Citytv to the CTV network in January 2008.

On April 11, 2012, host Jeanne Beker broke the news on Twitter by saying "This dream is over: After 27 glorious years, FT production ceased today."
