= See Ya 'Round =

Studio album by Split Enz
- Released: 22 November 1984
- Studio: AAV Studios (Melbourne)
- Genre: New wave
- Length: 43:02
- Label: Mushroom
- Producers: Jim Barton; Split Enz

Split Enz chronology
Conflicting Emotions (1983)	See Ya 'Round (1984)	The Living Enz (1985)

Singles from See Ya 'Round
- 1. "I Walk Away" Released: September 1984; 2. "One Mouth Is Fed" Released: 1984

Professional ratings
Review scores
Source	Rating
AllMusic	2.5/5 stars

See Ya 'Round is the ninth and final studio album by Split Enz. It was released in 1984 following the departure of founding member Tim Finn, whose solo career had officially taken off the year before. Remaining songwriter Neil Finn, claiming to be a little daunted by the prospect of leading his older brother's band, subsequently announced that this would be the final Split Enz studio recording. Since he only had an EP's worth of material ready, the record was filled out by lightweight, experimental contributions from each of the other band members, as well as "Kia Kaha", which had been previously released as a non-album B-side to "Message to My Girl", the second single from their previous album Conflicting Emotions. In interviews, Neil has revealed that the original EP was to have been the first five tracks on the album ("Breakin' My Back" through "Years Go By").

Neil Finn's demos from this era included an early version of the future Crowded House hit, "Something So Strong" (at this point a ballad), as well as prototypes for "I Walk Away" (known as "Love and Success" and "Your Inspiration"), and "Can't Carry On". Tim Finn had also recorded a collection of demos at Sing Sing Studios for the next Enz album, but his departure ensured that they would remain unreleased.

The album's lead single, "I Walk Away", had a low-budget video clip which features the band protruding their faces through theatrical costume cut-outs, much like on the artwork of the album. The song was also released on a 12" single, featuring an of-its-era extended remix. Neither single nor album were released in the US, because after most copies of 1983's Conflicting Emotions ended up in bargain bins, the American label A&M would not risk another potential Split Enz failure and dropped them from the roster. "I Walk Away" was later re-recorded (with a different verse) and included on the US issue of the first Crowded House album, as it was new to US audiences. Originally intended as a goodbye to Split Enz, and supposedly reflecting Neil's uncertainty of venturing away from the security of the band, key parts of the song were rewritten for the Crowded House album.

See Ya 'Round was initially released only in Australia and New Zealand, charting at #29 and #5, respectively. A later release in Canada featured a grey border on the cover instead of an orange one.

After an appearance on Countdown and the release of "One Mouth Is Fed" as a follow-up single, the band decided to end with a proper goodbye and beckoned Tim Finn back for one final "Enz With a Bang!" tour. It was on this tour that Neil met future Crowded House bassist and collaborator, Nick Seymour. After the last date on the tour in December 1984, Split Enz officially broke up. A live album was released a year later featuring songs from the three Melbourne shows of this tour and the 1982 "Time and Tide" tour.

== Track listing ==
All tracks are written by Neil Finn except where noted.

Side one
No.	Title	Writer(s)	Length
1.	"Breakin' My Back"		3:53
2.	"I Walk Away"		3:48
3.	"Doctor Love"		4:15
4.	"One Mouth Is Fed"		3:24
5.	"Years Go By"	N. Finn; Eddie Rayner	4:11
6.	"Voices"		3:30
Total length:			23:01

Side two
No.	Title	Writer(s)	Length
7.	"The Lost Cat" (instrumental)	Rayner	5:45
8.	"Adz"	Nigel Griggs	4:07
9.	"This Is Massive"	Paul Hester	3:24
10.	"Kia Kaha"		3:36
11.	"Ninnie Knees Up"	Noel Crombie	3:09
Total length:			20:01 43:02

Bonus track on 2006 re-release
No.	Title	Writer(s)	Length
12.	"Next Exit"	Tim Finn	3:15

- The first edition of the 2006 re-release accidentally includes "Mr. Catalyst", a Tim Finn song, while the packaging is incorrectly labelled as "Next Exit", which does not appear on the album. "Mr. Catalyst" was first released on the 1992 rarities album Rear Enz, while "Next Exit" was released as a non-album single in 1983 prior to the release of Conflicting Emotions, and was originally recorded with extra verses during the Luton sessions. The standard edition of the 2006 re-release properly includes "Next Exit" as listed on the packaging.

== Personnel ==
Personnel as listed in the album's liner notes are:

=== Split Enz ===
- Neil Finn – lead vocals, backing vocals, guitar
- Eddie Rayner – keyboards, synthesizer, backing vocals
- Noel Crombie – percussion, backing vocals, cover design, drums (10, 12), lead vocals (11)
- Nigel Griggs – bass guitar, backing vocals; all instruments and vocals (8)
- Paul Hester – drums, backing vocals, lead vocals (9)

=== Additional musicians ===
- Wilbur Wilde – saxophone (6)
- Bob Venier – flugelhorn (7)
- Tim Finn — vocals, piano and guitar (10, 12)

=== Production ===
- Jim Barton — producer, engineer
- Doug Brady — engineer
- Peter Thompson — assistant engineer
- Graeme Webber — cover photograph
- Dave Jeffries — cover artwork

== Charts ==
Chart (1984)	Peak position
Australia (Kent Music Report)	29
New Zealand Albums (RMNZ)	5

== Certifications ==
Region	Certification	Certified units/sales
New Zealand (RMNZ)	Platinum	15,000^{^}
^{^} Shipments figures based on certification alone.
