= Strange Behavior (album) =

Studio album by Animotion
- Released: February 17, 1986
- Studio: Oasis Recording Studios (North Hollywood, California); Ocean Way Recording (Hollywood, California); Encore Studios (Burbank, California)
- Genre: Synthpop, new wave
- Length: 39:14
- Label: Casablanca Records 826691
- Producer: Richie Zito

Animotion chronology
Animotion (1984)	Strange Behavior (1986)	Animotion (Room to Move) (1989)

Professional ratings
Review scores
Source	Rating
AllMusic	2/5 stars

Strange Behavior is an album by Animotion released by Casablanca Records. It was the last album to be released by Casablanca before the record label folded.

The single "I Engineer" hit #2 in Germany and #6 in Switzerland in 1986. The single "I Want You" hit #27 in Germany and #84 in the United States. The album went to #21 in Switzerland and reached #71 on the Billboard 200 chart.

== Track listing ==
1. "I Want You" (Rick Neigher, Bill Wadhams) – 4:35
2. "I Engineer" (Mike Chapman, Holly Knight, Bernie Taupin) – 4:13
3. "Strange Behavior" (Don Kirkpatrick, Randy Sharp) – 3:55
4. "Stealing Time" (Sue Shifrin, Wadhams) – 3:54
5. "Anxiety" (John Davis, Kirkpatrick, Dennis Morgan) – 4:11
6. "Out of Control" (Greg Smith, Louie Stone) – 3:28
7. "Stranded" (Smith, Stone) – 3:19
8. "The Essence" (Wadhams) – 4:06
9. "One Step Ahead" (Smith, Stone) – 3:36
10. "Staring Down the Demons" (Kirkpatrick, Sharp) – 4:12

== Personnel ==
Animotion

- Astrid Plane – vocals
- Bill Wadhams – vocals, keyboards, guitars
- Greg Smith – keyboards, gang vocals
- Don Kirkpatrick – guitars, gang vocals
- Charles “Char” Ottavio – bass guitar, gang vocals
- Jim Blair – drums, percussion

Additional personnel

- Gary Chang – synthesizers
- Tad Wadhams – fretless bass
- Mike Baird – drums

Production

- Richie Zito – producer, arrangements
- Animotion – arrangements
- Michael Frondelli – engineer (1)
- David Leonard – engineer (2–10), mixing
- Brian Reeves – engineer (2–10)
- David Concors – additional engineer
- Peggy Leonard – additional engineer
- Howie Weinberg – mastering at Masterdisk (New York City, New York)
- Matthew Rolston – photography
- Bill Levy – art direction
- Vigon/Seireeni – art direction

== Charts ==
The album spent 14 weeks on the U.S. Billboard pop albums chart, peaking at No. 71 in April 1986.

Chart (1986)	Peak position
Swiss Hitparade	21
US Billboard Top Pop Albums	71

Singles

Year	Single	Chart	Peak position
1986	"I Engineer"	US	76
1986	"I Engineer"	US Dance	27
1986	"I Engineer"	AUT	19
1986	"I Engineer"	GER	2
1986	"I Engineer"	SWI	6
1986	"I Want You"	US	84
1986	"I Want You"	GER	27
