= Let Him Go (song) =

Single by Animotion

from the album Animotion
- B-side: "Holding You" (7") "Let Him Go (Dub Mix)" (12")
- Released: May 1985
- Genre: Eurodisco
- Length: 3:58 (7"); 6:04 (12"); 4:16 (album version)
- Label: Mercury
- Songwriter(s): Bill Wadhams
- Producer(s): John Ryan

Animotion singles chronology
"Obsession" (1984)	"Let Him Go" (1985)	"I Engineer" (1986)

"Let Him Go" is a 1985 song by American synthpop band Animotion from their self-titled debut album. The song was their second single to reach the top 40 in the United States on the Billboard Hot 100, the first being "Obsession". The song also reached number 41 in Germany and number 78 in the United Kingdom. The song, in both 7" and 12" edits, appeared on the band's greatest hits album 20th Century Masters: The Best of Animotion.

== Charts ==
Chart (1985)	Peak position
Germany (Official German Charts)	41
UK (OCC)	78
US (Billboard Hot 100)	39
