= Never Ceases to Amaze Me =

Single by Split Enz

from the album Time and Tide
- B-side: "I See Red (Live)"
- Released: September 1982
- Genre: Pop, rock
- Length: 3:06
- Label: Mushroom Records
- Songwriter: Tim Finn

Split Enz singles chronology
"Six Months in a Leaky Boat" (1982)	"Never Ceases to Amaze Me" (1982)	"Hello Sandy Allen" (1982)

"Never Ceases to Amaze Me" is a song by New Zealand art rock group Split Enz. It was released in September 1982 as the third single from their album, Time and Tide.

The music video was shot in a zoo and featured band leader Tim Finn as a groundskeeper, showing the rest of the band, who have emerged from a futuristic spacecraft in Starfleet-style uniforms, around the zoo.

== Track listing ==
Released as 7" vinyl record in Australia only.

1. "Never Ceases to Amaze Me"
2. "I See Red (Live)"

== Personnel ==
- Tim Finn - vocals, piano
- Neil Finn - vocals, guitar
- Noel Crombie - drums, percussion
- Nigel Griggs - bass
- Eddie Rayner - percussion, keyboards

== Charts ==
Chart (1982)	Peak position
Australia (Kent Music Report)	50
