= I Don't Wanna Dance (Split Enz song) =

Single by Split Enz

from the album Waiata
- B-side: "Shark Attack (Live)"; "What's The Matter With You (Live)"
- Released: June 1981
- Recorded: 1980
- Genre: Pop, rock
- Length: 3:35
- Label: Mushroom Records
- Songwriter: Tim Finn
- Producer: David Tickle

Split Enz singles chronology
"History Never Repeats" (1981)	"I Don't Wanna Dance" (1981)	"Hard Act To Follow" (1981)

"I Don't Wanna Dance" is a song written by Tim Finn and recorded by Split Enz. It was released in June 1981 as the third single from their album, Waiata. Lead vocals were by Finn; his voice constantly changes throughout the song.

== Track listing ==
Australia/New Zealand 7"

1. "I Don't Wanna Dance"
2. "Shark Attack (Live)"
3. "What's the Matter With You (Live)"

U.S. promo 12"

1. "I Don't Wanna Dance"
2. "Hard Act To Follow"
3. "History Never Repeats"

== Personnel ==
- Tim Finn – vocals
- Neil Finn – vocals, guitar
- Noel Crombie – percussion
- Malcolm Green – drums
- Nigel Griggs – bass
- Eddie Rayner – vocals, keyboards

== Charts ==
Chart (1981)	Peak position
Australia (Kent Music Report)	65
