= The Best of Split Enz =

Greatest hits album by Split Enz
- Released: 1993
- Recorded: 1976–1983
- Genre: Rock

Split Enz chronology
Rear Enz (1992)	The Best of Split Enz (1993)	Anniversary (1994)

The Best of Split Enz is a greatest hits album by New Zealand rock band Split Enz. Featuring tracks recorded from 1976–1983, the album was only released in the UK, the Netherlands, and the US.

== Track listing ==
Track listing adapted from Amazon.

1. "Titus" [1976 version] 3:15 (Phil Judd)
2. "Late Last Night" [album version] 4:04 (Phil Judd)
3. "129 (Matinee Idyll)" [1976 version] 2:56 (Phil Judd/Tim Finn)
4. "Lovey Dovey" [1976 version] 3:08 (Phil Judd/Tim Finn)
5. "Time for a Change" [1976 version] 4:06 (Phil Judd)
6. "Crosswords" 3:24 (Tim Finn)
7. "Charley" 5:29 (Tim Finn)
8. "Another Great Divide" 3:40 (Phil Judd/Tim Finn/Eddie Rayner/Robert Gillies)
9. "Bold as Brass" 3:29 (Tim Finn/Robert Gillies)
10. "My Mistake" 3:01 (Tim Finn/Eddie Rayner)
11. "I See Red" [faded out version] 3:14 (Tim Finn)
12. "I Got You" 3:29 (Neil Finn)
13. "One Step Ahead" 2:53 (Neil Finn)
14. "History Never Repeats" 2:58 (Neil Finn)
15. "Six Months in a Leaky Boat" [A&M 7" edit] 3:14 (Tim Finn/Split Enz)
16. "Message to My Girl" 3:58 (Neil Finn)
