= I Engineer =

1986 single by Animotion

Single by Animotion

from the album Strange Behavior
- B-side: "The Essence"
- Released: 1986
- Length: 4:04
- Label: Mercury
- Songwriters: Mike Chapman, Bernie Taupin, Holly Knight
- Producer: Richie Zito

Animotion singles chronology
"Let Him Go" (1985)	"I Engineer" (1986)	"I Want You" (1986)

Audio
- "I Engineer" on YouTube

"I Engineer" is a song by American synth-pop band Animotion. Following its release, the song became a commercial success in German-speaking Europe and South Africa but was less successful elsewhere.

== Music video ==
The video for "I Engineer" was shot in Blackheath, England, in the abandoned Royal Herbert Hospital. There are also scenes crossing London Bridge, with the iconic building of the Financial Times newspaper in the background and people walking towards the city.

== Track listings ==
7-inch single

1. "I Engineer" – 4:02
2. "The Essence" – 4:06

12-inch single

1. "I Engineer" (remix) – 5:53
2. "I Engineer" (dub version) – 5:08
3. "Obsession" (remix) – 7:30

== Charts ==
=== Weekly charts ===
Chart (1986)	Peak position
Austria (Ö3 Austria Top 40)	19
Europe (European Hot 100 Singles)	79
South Africa (Springbok Radio)	4
Switzerland (Schweizer Hitparade)	6
US Billboard Hot 100	76
US 12-inch Singles Sales (Billboard) with "Obsession" (remix)	22
US Dance/Disco Club Play (Billboard) with "Obsession" (remix)	27
West Germany (GfK)	2

=== Year-end charts ===
Chart (1986)	Position
West Germany (Media Control)	19

== Cover versions ==
- 2002: 2 DJ's & One - I Engineer
- 2008: Bangbros - I Engineer
