= Fashion Television (TV channel) =

Defunct Canadian television channel

Coordinates: 43.649701°N 79.390233°W

- Country: Canada
- Broadcast area: Nationwide
- Headquarters: Toronto, Ontario

Programming
- Picture format: 480i (SDTV)

Ownership
- Owner: CHUM Limited (2001–2007); CTVglobemedia (2007–2011) (CTV Limited); Bell Media (2011–2021)

History
- Launched: September 7, 2001
- Closed: February 21, 2021

Fashion Television, also known as Fashion Television Channel, was a Canadian English language specialty channel owned by Bell Media.

It was originally established in 2001 by CHUM Limited as a brand extension of the Citytv series FashionTelevision, airing programming related to fashion, modelling, photography, art, architecture and design. Under Bell Media ownership and after the cancellation of its namesake, the network abandoned its original format and shifted primarily to airing Bell Media library programming with little relevance to its original format.

Amid declining investments in the channel, Fashion Television shut down along with BookTelevision on February 21, 2021.

== History ==
On November 24, 2000, CHUM Limited was granted approval by the Canadian Radio-television and Telecommunications Commission (CRTC) to launch Fashion Television: The Channel, described as "a national English-language specialty television service dedicated to fashion, beauty, style, art, architecture, photography and design."

The channel was launched on September 7, 2001, as FashionTelevisionChannel.

In July 2006, Bell Globemedia (later called CTVglobemedia) announced that it would purchase CHUM for an estimated $1.7 billion CAD. The sale was approved by the CRTC in June 2007, and the transaction was completed on June 22, 2007, with the Citytv stations were being sold to Rogers Media on October 31, 2007.

BCE (a minority shareholder in CTVglobemedia) announced on September 10, 2010, that it planned to re-acquire 100% interest in CTVglobemedia for a total debt and equity transaction cost of $3.2 billion CAD. The deal which required CRTC approval, was approved on March 7, 2011 and closed on April 1 of that year, at which time CTVglobemedia was renamed Bell Media.

The FashionTelevision series ended production in 2012, but repeats of that program and related series continued to air on the channel for a time. Along with BookTelevision, the channel later abandoned its original format and began to primarily air reruns of library programming from other Bell Media networks with little relevance to fashion. The channel ceased investments in original Canadian programming and was rarely promoted by Bell. In January 2021, the CRTC approved a request by Bell to revoke Fashion Television and BookTelevision's licenses, stating that it planned to shut both channels down on February 21.

== See also ==
- FashionTV
- Luxe.tv
- World Fashion Channel
