= Animotion (album) =

Studio album by Animotion
- Released: November 23, 1984
- Recorded: 1983
- Studios: Artisan Sound Recorders, Bill Schnee Studios, Sound City Studios, The Village Recorder
- Genres: Synth-pop; new wave
- Length: 39:56
- Label: Mercury
- Producer: John Ryan

Animotion chronology
Animotion (1984)	Strange Behavior (1986)

Singles from Animotion
- 1. "Obsession" Released: October 1984 & January 1985; 2. "Let Him Go" Released: May 1985

Professional ratings
Review scores
Source	Rating
AllMusic	4/5 stars

Animotion is the self-titled debut studio album from Los Angeles synth-pop sextet Animotion. It was released in 1984 on Mercury Records and features the group's biggest hit single, "Obsession".

Later in 1984, the album was released in Canada as The Language of Attraction, omitting the song "Turn Around".

== Canadian release ==
The album was released in Canada with the title The Language of Attraction. The song "Turn Around" was not included on this version, and "Run to Me" (track #8 on the original version) was moved up track 4 in its place. By the time of The Language of Attraction's release, keyboardist Greg Smith was listed as an official band member in the credits, while Paul Antonelli is simply listed as an "additional musical contributor."

== Chart performance ==
The album spent 17 weeks on the US Billboard 200 album charts and reached its peak position of number 28 in May 1985.

== Track listing ==
All songs written by Bill Wadhams, except where noted.

1. "Obsession" (Michael Des Barres, Holly Knight) – 5:34
2. "Let Him Go" – 4:16
3. "Everything's Leading to You" – 4:42
4. "Turn Around" – 3:54
5. "Fun Fun Fun" – 3:44
6. "Tremble" (Jason Ball) – 4:32
7. "Holding You" – 4:40
8. "Run to Me" (Rick Neigher, Wadhams) – 4:13
9. "Open Door" (Don Kirkpatrick, Wadhams) – 4:05

== Personnel ==
Animotion

- Astrid Plane – vocals
- Paul Antonelli – keyboards
- Bill Wadhams – guitars, vocals
- Don Kirkpatrick – guitars
- Charles “Char” Ottavio – bass guitar
- Frenchy O'Brien – drums, percussion

Additional personnel

- Gary Chang – synthesizers
- Greg Smith – keyboards
- Holly Knight – Fairlight programming
- Stevie Fryette – guitars
- Dennis Belfield – bass guitar
- Jeff Stern – drums

Production

- John Ryan – producer
- Jeff Harris – recording
- Bob Schaper – engineer, mixing
- Chris Minto – engineer
- Russ Bracher – assistant engineer
- Tim Dennen – assistant engineer
- Greg Fulginiti – mastering at Artisan Sound Recorders ( Hollywood, California)
- Shannon Pasternak – album coordinator
- Bill Levy – art direction
- Steeleworks – design
- Richard E. Aaron – photography
- Larry Ross – management
- Track 1 published by Pacific Island Publishing c/o Career Music & Makiki Publishing c/o Arista Music Inc. Tracks 2-5, 7 & 9 published by Big Wad. Track 6 published by Zone R Music/Big Wad. Track 8 published by Big Wad & Vogue Music c/o The Welk Music Group.
