= Time and Tide (Split Enz album) =

Studio album by Split Enz
- Released: April 1982
- Genre: New wave
- Length: 40:49
- Label: Polydor
- Producers: Hugh Padgham; Split Enz

Split Enz chronology
Waiata (1981)	Time and Tide (1982)	Enz of an Era (1982)

Singles from Time and Tide
- 1. "Dirty Creature" Released: March 1982; 2. "Six Months in a Leaky Boat" Released: May 1982; 3. "Never Ceases to Amaze Me" Released: September 1982

Professional ratings
Review scores
Source	Rating
AllMusic	4.5/5 stars

Time and Tide is the seventh studio album by the New Zealand new wave band Split Enz, released in April 1982. Recorded in Sydney starting the prior December, it topped the charts in New Zealand and Australia and won Best Australian Album at the Countdown Australian Music Awards. The album was re-released in a remastered edition in 2006, alongside the rest of the Split Enz catalogue. Of the ten albums in the remaster series, Time and Tide was one of four not to include any bonus tracks, the others being Second Thoughts, The Beginning of the Enz and Conflicting Emotions.

== Track listing ==
Side one
No.	Title	Writer(s)	Length
1.	"Dirty Creature"	Neil Finn; Tim Finn; Nigel Griggs	3:58
2.	"Giant Heartbeat"	N. Finn; Griggs	3:52
3.	"Hello Sandy Allen"	N. Finn	3:47
4.	"Never Ceases to Amaze Me"	T. Finn	3:06
5.	"Lost for Words"	N. Finn; T. Finn; Griggs	2:57
6.	"Small World"	T. Finn	3:31
Total length:			21:11

Side two
No.	Title	Writer(s)	Length
7.	"Take a Walk"	N. Finn	3:29
8.	"Pioneer" (instrumental)	Eddie Rayner	1:29
9.	"Six Months in a Leaky Boat"	T. Finn; Split Enz	4:14
10.	"Haul Away"	T. Finn	2:25
11.	"Log Cabin Fever"	N. Finn	4:31
12.	"Make Sense of It"	N. Finn; T. Finn; Griggs; Rayner; Noel Crombie	3:30
Total length:			19:38 40:49

== Personnel ==
Personnel as listed in the album's liner notes are:

=== Split Enz ===
- Tim Finn – vocals, piano
- Neil Finn – vocals, guitar
- Noel Crombie – drums, percussion, cover photography
- Nigel Griggs – bass guitar
- Eddie Rayner – keyboards, percussion

=== Production ===
- Hugh Padgham — engineering, production
- David Price — engineering
- Ian Cooper, Howard Grey — mastering
- Jeff Ayeroff — art direction

== Charts ==
=== Weekly charts ===
Weekly chart performance for Time and Tide
Chart (1982)	Peak position
Australian Albums (Kent Music Report)	1
Canadian Albums (RPM)	4
New Zealand Albums (RMNZ)	1
UK Albums (OCC)	71
US Top LPs & Tape (Billboard)	58

=== Year-end charts ===
Year-end chart performance for Time and Tide
Chart (1982)	Position
Australian Albums (Kent Music Report)	8
Canadian Albums (RPM)	38
New Zealand Albums (RIANZ)	3

== Certifications and sales ==
Certifications and sales for Time and Tide
Region	Certification	Certified units/sales
Australia (ARIA)	2× Platinum	140,000^{^}
Canada (Music Canada)	Platinum	100,000^{^}
New Zealand (RMNZ)	2× Platinum	30,000^{^}
^{^} Shipments figures based on certification alone.

== See also ==
- List of Top 25 albums for 1982 in Australia
