= Next Exit (song) =

Single by Split Enz
- B-side: "Two of a Kind" / "Remember When"
- Released: March 1983
- Genre: Pop, rock
- Length: 3:40
- Label: Mushroom
- Songwriter(s): Tim Finn

Split Enz singles chronology
"Hello Sandy Allen" (1982)	"Next Exit" (1983)	"Strait Old Line" (1983)

"Next Exit" is a song by New Zealand art rock group Split Enz. It was written by Tim Finn and released as a non-album single in Australia in March 1983.

An earlier version of "Next Exit", together with one of its B-sides ("Remember When"), was originally recorded as a demo during the Rootin Tootin Luton Tapes sessions in 1978.

== Track listing ==
1. "Next Exit" – 3:40
2. "Two of a Kind" – 3:41
3. "Remember When" – 3:15

== Personnel ==
- Neil Finn – vocals, guitar, piano
- Tim Finn – vocals, guitar, piano, keyboards
- Noel Crombie – vocals, percussion
- Nigel Griggs – vocals, bass guitar
- Eddie Rayner – keyboards and machines

== Charts ==
Chart performance for "Next Exit"
Chart (1983)	Peak position
Australia (Kent Music Report)	47
