= I Walk Away =

Single by Split Enz

from the album See Ya 'Round
- Released: September 1984
- Recorded: 1984
- Genre: Pop, rock
- Length: 3:49
- Label: Mushroom Records
- Songwriter(s): Neil Finn
- Producer(s): Jim Barton, Split Enz

Split Enz singles chronology
"I Wake Up Every Night" (1984)	"I Walk Away" (1984)	"One Mouth Is Fed" (1984)

"I Walk Away" is a song written by Neil Finn, and originally recorded by Finn's group Split Enz. It was released in September 1984 as the lead single from their final studio album See Ya 'Round, and was a chart hit in New Zealand and Australia.

Finn's next group, Crowded House, re-recorded the song for the North American version of their self-titled debut album of 1986. (See Ya 'Round was not issued in the U.S., and therefore the song "I Walk Away" was new to U.S. audiences.) "I Walk Away" was not included on the original Australian/NZ release of Crowded House, but all later re-issues of the album in all countries include "I Walk Away" as a standard track. The Crowded House version of the song is slightly rewritten from the original Split Enz version, and features a different verse.

Finn sings both the Split Enz and Crowded House versions of "I Walk Away", and Paul Hester (who was a member of both groups) was the drummer on both.

== Reception ==
Reviewing the Crowded House version, Junkee said, "There's something zeitgeisty about this one — it feels like U2 at their hungriest, propulsive and urgent in its delivery. Hester puts on a showcase of tension and release, while Seymour holds down the low-end and Finn executes some truly underrated guitar work."

== Track listing ==
=== 12" vinyl ===
Side A

1. "I Walk Away (Extended Version)"

Side B

1. "Doctor Love"

=== 7" vinyl ===
1. "I Walk Away" 3:49
2. "Over Drive" 3:43

== Personnel ==
- Neil Finn - vocals, guitar
- Eddie Rayner - keyboards, synthesizer, backing vocals
- Noel Crombie - percussion
- Nigel Griggs - bass
- Paul Hester - drums

== Charts ==
Chart (1984)	Peak position
Australia (Kent Music Report)	45
New Zealand (Recorded Music NZ)	13
