= The Beginning of the Enz =

Compilation album by Split Enz
- Released: November 1979
- Recorded: 1973–1974
- Genres: Folk rock, progressive rock
- Length: 29:33
- Label: Mushroom

Split Enz chronology
Frenzy (1979)	The Beginning of the Enz (1979)	True Colours (1980)

The Beginning of the Enz is a compilation album from the New Zealand rock group Split Enz. It contains non-album singles and demos that pre-date the band's first album Mental Notes. Three of these songs, "129", "Lovey Dovey" and "Spellbound", were later re-recorded and included on Mental Notes and Second Thoughts.

The album reached number 35 in New Zealand, but did not chart in Australia.

An unrelated compilation album, Beginning of the Enz (dropping "The" from the title), was released in the UK in 1980 by Chrysalis Records.

== Track listing ==
All tracks are written by Phil Judd and Tim Finn, except for "Malmsbury Villa" by Judd.

Side one
No.	Title	Original release and year	Length
1.	"Split Ends"	B-side of single "For You" (recorded and released in 1973)	1:49
2.	"For You"	Single (recorded and released in 1973)	3:50
3.	"129"	B-side of single "Sweet Talkin' Spoon Song" (recorded and released in 1973); re-released as "Matinee Idyll (129)" on Second Thoughts	2:49
4.	"Home Sweet Home"	B-side of single "No Bother to Me" (recorded in 1973, released in 1975)	3:43
5.	"Sweet Talkin' Spoon Song"	Single (recorded and released in 1973)	3:24
Total length:			15:35

Side two
No.	Title	Original release and year	Length
6.	"No Bother to Me"	Single (recorded in 1974, released in 1975)	3:11
7.	"Malmsbury Villa"	Demo (recorded in 1974), previously unreleased	2:49
8.	"Lovey Dovey"	Demo (recorded in 1974); re-recorded and re-released on Second Thoughts	3:23
9.	"Spellbound"	Demo (recorded in 1974); re-recorded and re-released on Mental Notes	4:35
Total length:			13:58 29:33

- This version of "Spellbound" has Tim Finn on lead vocals, compared to the album version which has Phil Judd singing lead.

== Personnel ==
=== Split Enz ===
- Tim Finn — vocals, piano
- Phil Judd — vocals, guitar, mandolin
- Mike Chunn — bass guitar
- Miles Golding — violin (1-2)
- Mike Howard — flute (1-2)
- Div Vercoe — drums (2)
- Paul "Wally" Wilkinson — guitar (3-9)
- Geoff Chunn — drums (3-9)
- Rob Gillies — saxophone (3), trumpet (6-9)
- Eddie Rayner — keyboards (6-9)

== Charts ==
Chart (1979–80)	Peak position
New Zealand Albums (RMNZ)	35
