= Animotion =

American synth-pop band

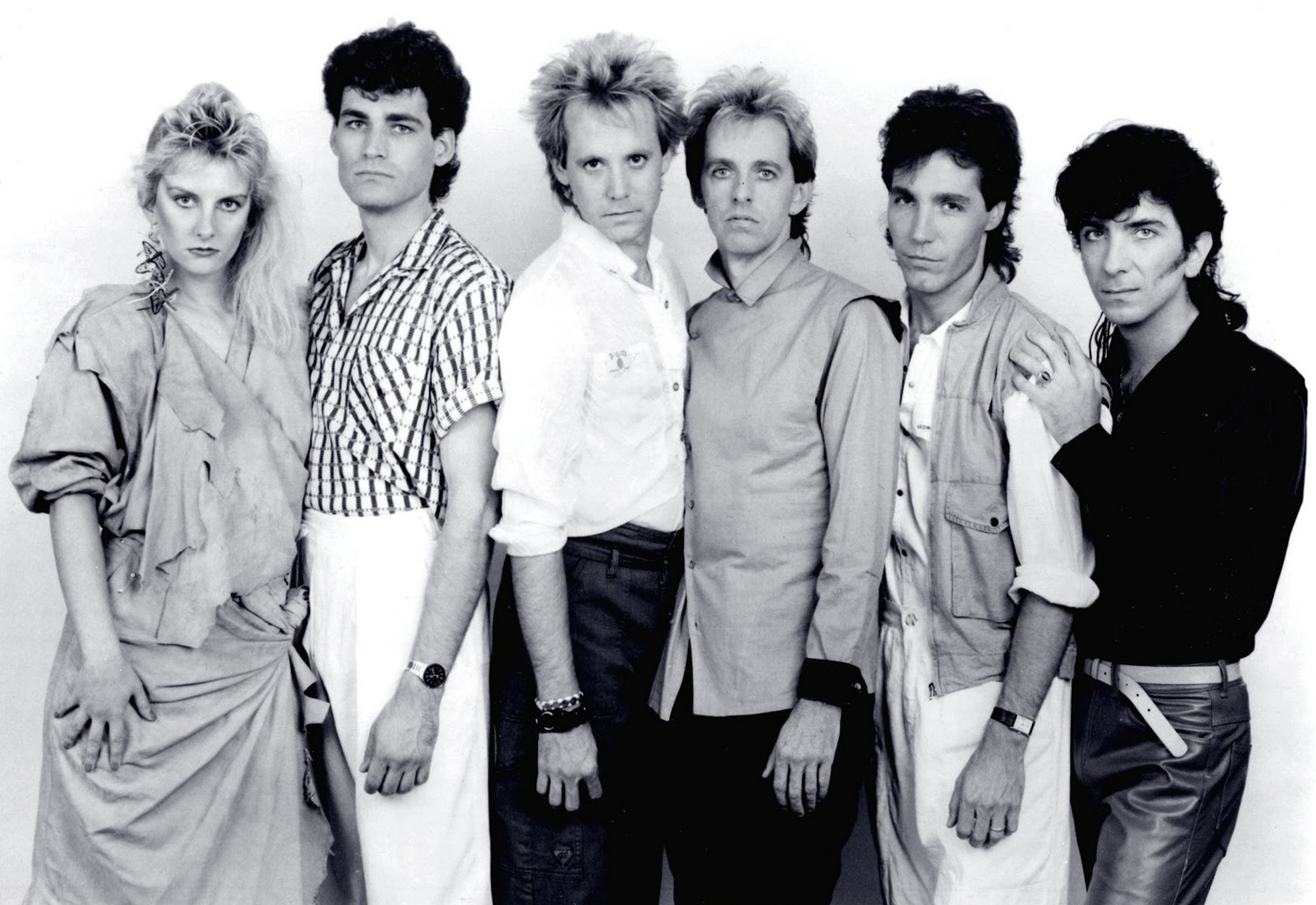
- Animotion, c. 1984

Background information
- Origin: Los Angeles, California, U.S.
- Genres: New wave; synth-pop
- Years active: 1983–1990; 2001–present
- Labels: Mercury; Polydor; Invisible Hands Music
- Members: Astrid Plane; Bill Wadhams; Don Kirkpatrick; Greg Smith; Jim Blair; Chris Wadhams
- Past members: Paul Antonelli; Charles (aka: Char) Ottavio; David O'Brien (deceased); Kevin Rankin; Paul Engemann; Cynthia Rhodes
- Website: animotion.band

Animotion is an American synth-pop band from Los Angeles, California, best known for the songs "Obsession", "Let Him Go", "I Engineer", and "Room to Move". Formed in 1983 from the remnants of a retro science-fiction band called Red Zone, the band emerged during the height of the new wave and synth-pop movement, combining electronic instrumentation with rock influences. They signed a record deal with Mercury Records in 1984 and released four studio albums.

Their self-titled debut album, Animotion (1984), featured "Obsession", which became a major international hit, reaching the top 10 on the Billboard Hot 100 and charting in multiple countries. The band followed up with albums such as Strange Behavior (1986) and Animotion (1989), but underwent several lineup changes, including the departure of founding members Astrid Plane and Bill Wadhams.

After disbanding in the early 1990s, Animotion reunited in 2001 with several of its original members and has continued to perform live. Their first studio album in 27 years, Raise, came out in the UK in 2016 and in the US in 2017 as Raise Your Expectations.

== History ==
=== Formation and rise (1983–1986) ===
Animotion was founded by four former members of Los Angeles-based band Red Zone and the lead singer of the Billy Bond band. Both Red Zone and the Billy Bond Band would play at the popular music venue Madame Wong's and knew of each other. A manager who heard that Red Zone were considering breaking up suggested that Billy Bond Band vocalist Bill Wadhams look into working with them, and particularly their vocalist Astrid Plane. After Wadhams demonstrated some of his original material to the group, the two parties decided to form a new band with the name "Animotion" suggested by Astrid to convey energy and motion.

The initial line-up was made up of dual lead vocalists in Wadhams and Plane, keyboardist Paul Antonelli, bassist Charles Ottavio, and drummer David "Frenchy" O'Brien. With Wadhams already handling some guitar duties, lead guitarist Don Kirkpatrick was brought into the band to supplement their sound. The now-six-piece lineup recorded their 1984 self-titled debut album, further augmented by session keyboardist Greg Smith. Released near the end of the year, a single from this album, "Obsession", written by hit American songwriter Holly Knight and noted British singer/actor Michael Des Barres (who originally cut the song themselves as "Knight and Des Barres" for the 1983 movie A Night in Heaven), became a worldwide success and the band's first US Billboard Hot 100 Top Ten single, peaking early the following year. The follow-up single from this album, "Let Him Go", also cracked the US Top 40 after being remixed to sound more like its predecessor.

Following the departures of Antonelli and O'Brien, Smith became an official member of the band, along with new drummer Jim Blair, prior to the recording of the follow-up album, Strange Behavior (1986). While several singles were released from this album, its success in the US paled in comparison to the debut album, whereas the band had much more success in Germany, Austria, Switzerland and South Africa, thanks to the LP's single "I Engineer", another Holly Knight composition which was co-written with Bernie Taupin and Mike Chapman. "I Engineer" reached the Top 20 (and sometimes as high as the Top 5) in those countries. During 1986 and 1987 Animotion toured extensively, appearing alongside such performers as Phil Collins, Depeche Mode, Eurythmics, Genesis, Howard Jones, INXS, and Simply Red.

=== Departures and decline (1987–1990) ===
In the midst of recording their third album, Animotion went through personnel changes, as all three of the remaining founding members (Ottavio, Plane, and Wadhams) departed, along with Blair. The split was not amicable; Ottavio and Plane (who by this point were a couple, and later married) were fired from the band at the behest of the management, while Wadhams' departure was the culmination of a refusal of the record label to allow him to continue to write songs for the band (on their first album he had served as principal songwriter and, along with Kirkpatrick and Smith, had performed the same role on the second), a condition which he felt uncomfortable with.

Actress/dancer/singer Cynthia Rhodes replaced Plane as female lead singer, and former solo artist/Device member Paul Engemann replaced Wadhams as the male lead for Animotion's second self-titled album, informally known as "Room to Move" (due to the success of this song) to distinguish it from their first LP. Incidentally, Engemann's former band, Device, had also included Holly Knight (co-writer of "Obsession"). Of the earlier lineup, only Kirkpatrick and Smith stayed on to record the album with Rhodes and Engemann, and the label brought in outside writers for the songs. The single "Room to Move", a remake of a song from Climie Fisher's 1988 album Everything, was featured in the movie My Stepmother Is an Alien and peaked at number 9 on the Billboard Hot 100 in May 1989, the band's second top 10 hit in the US. However, the album itself did not crack the top 100 on the charts, and Animotion broke up soon afterwards.

=== Reformation (2001–present) ===
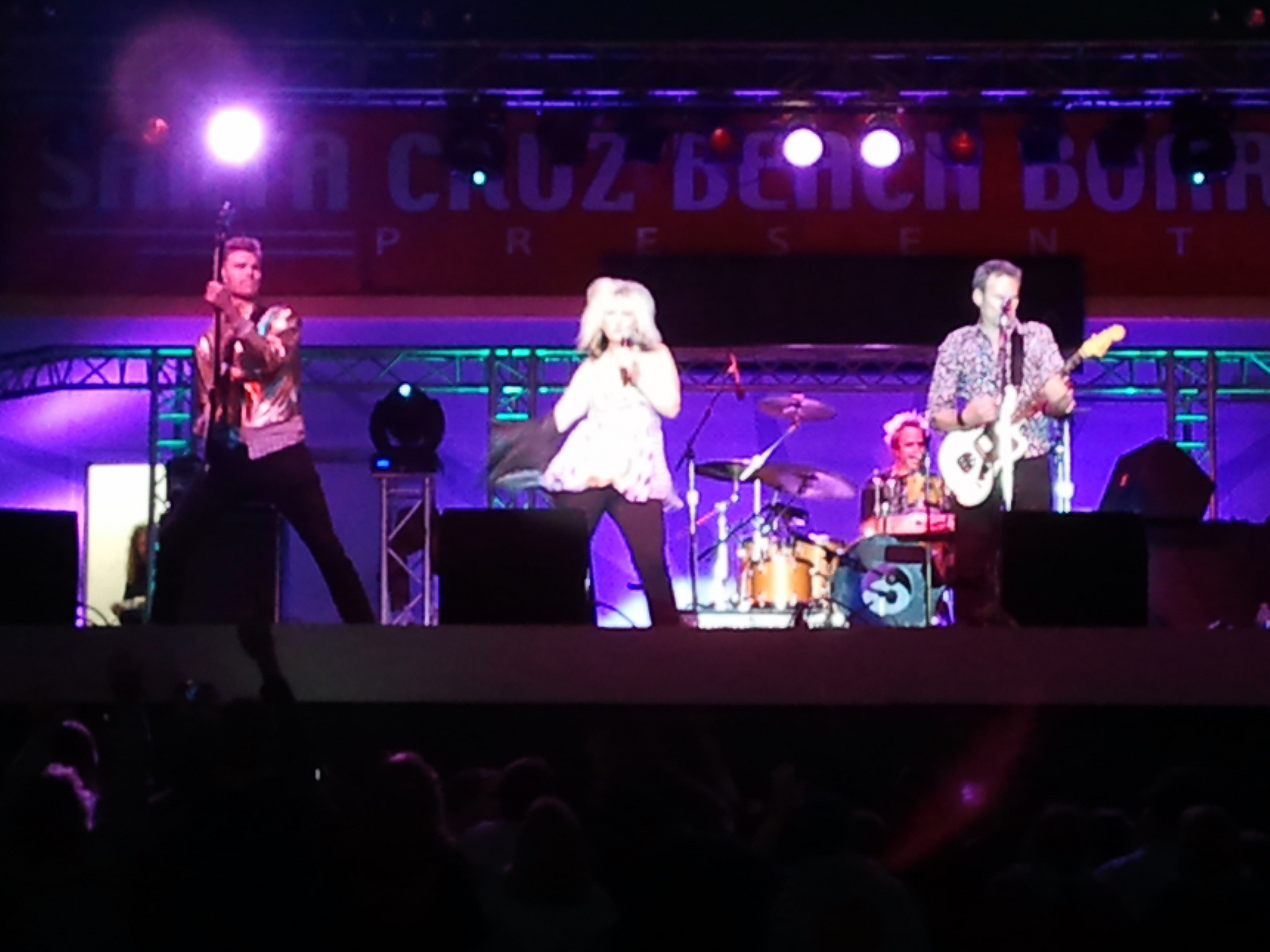
Animotion performing at Santa Cruz Beach Boardwalk, July 27, 2012

Several of the original members reunited on February 8, 2001, in response to a request from Alex Hart and radio station KNRK in Portland, Oregon, performing for a sold-out crowd. Plane, Wadhams, Kirkpatrick, and Smith have continued to perform as Animotion since this time; with drummer Kevin Rankin joining them in 2002, and Bill's son Chris Wadhams joining as bass player in 2011. Don Kirkpatrick also plays in Rod Stewart's band. When he is unavailable, Portland, Oregon guitarist Kevin Hahn serves in the position. They have performed many shows with A Flock of Seagulls, Wang Chung, Berlin and the Motels in recent years.

In the summer of 2005, Ottavio made a guest appearance alongside Plane and Wadhams who appeared as Animotion in the American version of the TV show Hit Me Baby One More Time, performing their hit "Obsession" and a cover of Dirty Vegas' "Days Go By".

In 2014, Wadhams heard a remix of "Obsession" by a Colorado DJ named Joman. After reaching out to the DJ, Joman offered to remix new material from the band. Wadhams sent a recording of "Raise" and the remixed product was used to obtain a record deal with Invisible Hands Music in London. After 26 years, the band—featuring core members Plane, Wadhams, Kirkpatrick, and Smith—released a new album entitled Raise, which was released in 2016 in the UK and a month later on January 20, 2017 (as Raise Your Expectations) in the US. Joman's rendition of "Raise" along with Animotion's classic "Let Him Go" are featured on the album. A music video, directed by producer Chuck Kentis' son Noah, was made for the song "Last Time"; it features a mix of live-action and animated elements. The album cover was created by Jay Vigon, who created Animotion's original logo and the logo for Prince's film Purple Rain.

The band's original drummer, David "Frenchy" O'Brien (born May 23, 1947, in Worcester, Massachusetts), died on January 13, 2019, at age 71.

In January 2023, a US show was announced: the band played at the Cruel World Festival in Pasadena, California on May 20, 2023.

== Personnel ==
=== Members ===
Current members

- Astrid Plane – lead vocals (1983–1988, 2001–present)
- Bill Wadhams – lead vocals, guitars (1983–1988, 2001–present)
- Don Kirkpatrick – lead guitars (1983–1990, 2001–present)
- Greg Smith – keyboards (1985–1990, 2001–present)
- Jim Blair – drums (1985–1988, 2017–present)
- Chris Wadhams – bass (2011–present)
- Wyatt Blair – bass/guitar (2018–present)

Touring musician

- Kevin Hahn – lead guitars (2003–present; substitute for Don Kirkpatrick)

Former members

- Paul Antonelli – keyboards (1983–1985)
- David "Frenchy" O'Brien – drums (1983–1985; died 2019)
- Charles "Char" Ottavio – bass (1983–1988; guest appearance – 2005, 2022)
- Kevin Rankin – drums (2002–2016)
- Paul Engemann – lead vocals (1988–1990)
- Cynthia Rhodes – lead vocals (1988–1990)

=== Line-ups ===
1983	1983–1985	1985–1988	1988–1990
Astrid Plane – lead vocals; Bill Wadhams – lead vocals, guitars; Paul Antonelli – keyboards; Charles Ottavio – bass; David "Frenchy" O'Brien – drums	Astrid Plane – lead vocals; Bill Wadhams – lead vocals, guitars; Don Kirkpatrick – lead guitar; Paul Antonelli – keyboards; Charles Ottavio – bass; David "Frenchy" O'Brien – drums	Astrid Plane – lead vocals; Bill Wadhams – lead vocals, guitars; Don Kirkpatrick – lead guitar; Greg Smith – keyboards; Charles Ottavio – bass; Jim Blair – drums	Paul Engemann – lead vocals; Cynthia Rhodes – lead vocals; Don Kirkpatrick – lead guitar; Greg Smith – keyboards
1990–2001	2001–2002	2002–2011	2011–present
Disbanded	Astrid Plane – lead vocals; Bill Wadhams – lead vocals, guitars; Don Kirkpatrick – lead guitar; Greg Smith – keyboards	Astrid Plane – lead vocals; Bill Wadhams – lead vocals, guitars; Don Kirkpatrick – lead guitar; Greg Smith – keyboards; Kevin Rankin – drums	Astrid Plane – lead vocals; Bill Wadhams – lead vocals, guitars; Don Kirkpatrick – lead guitar; Greg Smith – keyboards; Wyatt Blair – bass/guitar; Chris Wadhams – bass; Jim Blair – drums

== Discography ==
=== Studio albums ===
Year	Album details	Peak chart positions			
Year	Album details	US	SWI	CAN	GER
1984	Animotion: Release date: 1984; Label: Mercury Records	28	—	21	—
1986	Strange Behavior: Release date: February 1986; Label: Casablanca Records	71	21	—	19
1989	Animotion (Room to Move): Release date: February 21, 1989; Label: Polydor Records	110	—	—	—
2016	Raise Your Expectations: Release date: December 2, 2016; Label: Invisible Hands Music	—	—	—	—
—	"—" denotes releases that did not chart				

+ The band's self-titled debut album was re-titled The Language of Attraction for its Canadian release (which also omitted the song "Turn Around")

=== Compilation albums ===
Year	Album details
1996	Obsession: The Best of Animotion: Release date: April 16, 1996; Label: Mercury Records
2006	20th Century Masters: The Best of Animotion: Release date: March 21, 2006; Label: Universal Records

=== Singles ===
Year	Single	Peak chart positions												Certifications (sales threshold)	Album
Year	Single	US CB	US	US AC	US Dan	CAN	AUT	GER	NZ	SWI	UK	SA	NL	Certifications (sales threshold)	Album
1984	"Obsession"	6	6	—	35	7	17	8	10	—	5	9	42	CAN: Gold	Animotion
1985	"Let Him Go"	35	39	—	—	—	—	41	—	—	78	—	—		Animotion
1986	"I Engineer"	—	76	—	27	—	19	2	—	6	—	4	—		Strange Behavior
1986	"I Want You"	74	84	—	—	—	—	27	—	—	—	—	—		Strange Behavior
1989	"Room to Move"	12	9	46	—	11	—	—	34	—	87	—	—		Animotion (Room to Move)
1989	"Calling It Love"	54	53	—	—	—	—	—	—	—	—	—	—		Animotion (Room to Move)
"—" denotes releases that did not chart
