= History Never Repeats =

Single by Split Enz

from the album Waiata
- B-side: "Holy Smoke"
- Released: March 1981
- Recorded: AAV Studios, Melbourne, 1980
- Genre: New wave
- Length: 3:00
- Label: Mushroom Records
- Songwriter: Neil Finn
- Producer: David Tickle

Split Enz singles chronology
"One Step Ahead" (1980)	"History Never Repeats" (1981)	"I Don't Wanna Dance" (1981)

"History Never Repeats" is a single written by Neil Finn and recorded by Split Enz. It was released in March 1981 as the second single from their album, Waiata. The song remains one of their most popular. It was also used as the title of two compilation albums by the band.

The guitar bridge in this song, played by Neil Finn, was originally featured in an old Phil Judd song, "Bergen Aan Zee". The band only played the latter song live.

The video was the 12th to be played by MTV upon its launch in 1981. In 2001 the song was voted by members of APRA as the 57th-best New Zealand song of the 20th century.

== Reception ==
Bernard Zuel said "History Never Repeats" was "a synth pop song that forgot to get rid of guitars."

== Track listings ==
=== Australasian release ===
1. "History Never Repeats" – 3:00
2. "Holy Smoke"

=== International release ===
Released in the UK, the Netherlands, Spain and Portugal with different artwork and track listings.

UK/Portugal track listing

1. "History Never Repeats" – 3:00
2. "Shark Attack (Live)"
3. "What's The Matter With You (Live)"

Netherlands/Spain track listing

1. "History Never Repeats" – 3:00
2. "What's the Matter with You (Live)"

== Personnel ==
- Neil Finn – vocals, guitar
- Tim Finn – vocals
- Noel Crombie – percussion
- Malcolm Green – drums
- Nigel Griggs – bass
- Eddie Rayner – vocals, keyboards

== Charts ==
=== Weekly charts ===
Chart (1981)	Peak position
Australia (Kent Music Report)	4
New Zealand (Recorded Music NZ)	5
UK Singles Chart	63
US Mainstream Rock	33

=== Year-end charts ===
Chart (1981)	Position
Australia (Kent Music Report)	49
