= Mental Notes (Split Enz album) =

Studio album by Split Enz
- Released: 31 July 1975
- Recorded: May–June 1975
- Studio: Festival Studios (Sydney)
- Genre: Progressive rock
- Length: 44:12
- Labels: White Cloud (New Zealand); Mushroom (Australia)
- Producers: David Russell; Split Enz

Split Enz chronology
| Mental Notes (1975) | Second Thoughts (1976) |

Professional ratings
Review scores
| Source | Rating |
|---|---|
| AllMusic | 4.5/5 stars |

Mental Notes is the debut album by New Zealand band Split Enz. The album cover was painted by band member Phil Judd. Original vinyl copies featured Judd saying "Make a mental note" in the runout groove of the record's second side (after the final track "Mental Notes"), causing the phrase to be looped perpetually on manual turntables until the stylus is removed.

== Recording ==
Bassist Mike Chunn later complained about the "totally unsympathetic treatment we'd had when we were recording in Australia. The engineer in Sydney thought we couldn't tune our guitars and that we were unprofessional and he just showed total disinterest right through."

Much of the material derived from Tim Finn's and Phil Judd's fascination with the work of the English writer and artist Mervyn Peake – notably "Spellbound", the epic track "Stranger Than Fiction" (their concert centrepiece), and "Titus", named after the hero of Peake's Gormenghast trilogy.

== Track listing ==
All tracks are written by Phil Judd and Tim Finn except where noted.

Side one
| No. | Title | Length |
|---|---|---|
| 1. | "Walking Down a Road" (*) | 5:26 |
| 2. | "Under the Wheel" | 7:50 |
| 3. | "Amy (Darling)" | 5:18 |
| 4. | "So Long for Now" | 3:19 |
| Total length: | | 21:53 |

Side two
| No. | Title | Writer(s) | Length |
|---|---|---|---|
| 5. | "Stranger Than Fiction" (*) | | 6:58 |
| 6. | "Time for a Change" (*) | Judd | 3:46 |
| 7. | "Maybe" | | 2:59 |
| 8. | "Titus" (*) | Judd | 3:02 |
| 9. | "Spellbound" | | 5:00 |
| 10. | "Mental Notes" | Judd | 0:34 |
| Total length: | | | 22:19 44:12 |

Bonus tracks on 2006 remaster
| No. | Title | Length |
|---|---|---|
| 11. | "129" (live) | 3:03 |
| 12. | "Lovey Dovey" (live) | 3:22 |

Track notes

- Songs which were re-recorded for the album Second Thoughts are denoted with an asterisk (*).
- This version of "Spellbound" has Phil Judd singing lead vocals. A 1974 demo version, found on The Beginning of the Enz album, has Tim Finn singing lead.

== Personnel ==
Personnel as listed in the album's liner notes are:

=== Split Enz ===
- Tim Finn — vocals, piano
- Phil Judd — vocals, acoustic and electric guitars, mandolin, cover artwork
- Eddie Rayner — acoustic and electric pianoes, Mellotron, synthesizer, organ, Clavinet
- Wally Wilkinson — lead guitar
- Mike Chunn — bass guitar, piano (track 8)
- Emlyn Crowther — drums
- Noel Crombie — percussion

=== Production ===
- Richard Batchens — engineer
- David Russell — producer
- Graeme Webber — artwork

== Charts ==
| Chart (1975) | Peak position |
|---|---|
| Australia (Kent Music Report) | 35 |
| New Zealand Albums (RMNZ) | 7 |
