= Late Last Night =

Single by Split Enz

from the album Second Thoughts
- B-side: "Time for a Change"
- Released: April 1976
- Recorded: 1976
- Genre: Progressive rock
- Length: 4:06
- Label: Mushroom Records
- Songwriter: Phil Judd
- Producer: Phil Manzanera

Split Enz singles chronology
"Maybe" (1975)	"Late Last Night" (1976)	"Matinee Idyll" (1976)

"Late Last Night" was a single originally recorded by New Zealand band Split Enz in Australia in 1976. Written by Phil Judd, it was accompanied by the band's first promotional video clip. The single was a minor hit on the Australian Top 100, reaching number 93.

The song was re-recorded in London later the same year for the album Second Thoughts.

== Track listings ==
=== Australia/New Zealand release ===
1. "Late Last Night" 4:06
2. "Time for a Change" (live) 4:05

=== Netherlands release ===
1. "Late Last Night" (re-recording) 4:06
2. "Titus" 3:14

== Personnel ==
- Tim Finn - vocals
- Phil Judd - vocals, guitars, mandolin
- Mike Chunn - bass
- Noel Crombie - percussion
- Emlyn Crowther - drums
- Robert Gillies - saxophone, trumpet
- Eddie Rayner - keyboards

== Charts ==
Chart (1976)	Peak position
Australia (Kent Music Report)	93
