= Dirty Creature =

Single by Split Enz

from the album Time and Tide
- B-side: "Make Sense of It"
- Released: March 1982
- Genre: Pop, rock
- Length: 4:02
- Label: Mushroom Records
- Songwriter(s): Tim Finn, Nigel Griggs, Neil Finn

Split Enz singles chronology
"Iris" (1981)	"Dirty Creature" (1982)	"Six Months in a Leaky Boat" (1982)

"Dirty Creature" is a song by New Zealand art rock group Split Enz. It was released in March 1982 as the lead single from their album Time and Tide.

Tim Finn had been suffering from panic attacks at the time, and co-wrote the song as a relief for his condition.

== Track listing ==
1. "Dirty Creature" 4:02
2. "Make Sense of It" 3:40

== Personnel ==
- Tim Finn – vocals, piano
- Neil Finn – vocals, guitar
- Noel Crombie – drums, percussion
- Nigel Griggs – bass
- Eddie Rayner – percussion, keyboards

== Charts ==
=== Weekly charts ===
Weekly chart performance for "Dirty Creature"
Chart (1982)	Peak position
Australia (Kent Music Report)	6
New Zealand (Recorded Music NZ)	3

=== Year-end charts ===
Year-end chart performance for "Dirty Creature"
Chart (1982)	Position
Australia (Kent Music Report)	60
