= Conflicting Emotions =

Studio album by Split Enz
- Released: November 1983
- Studio: Paradise Studios (Sydney)
- Genre: New wave
- Length: 42:23
- Label: Polydor
- Producers: Hugh Padgham; Eddie Rayner

Split Enz chronology
Enz of an Era (1982)	Conflicting Emotions (1983)	See Ya 'Round (1984)

Singles from Conflicting Emotions
- 1. "Strait Old Line" Released: October 1983; 2. "Message to My Girl" Released: January 1984

Professional ratings
Review scores
Source	Rating
AllMusic	3/5 stars

Conflicting Emotions is the eighth studio album by New Zealand art-rock band Split Enz.

In contrast to the recording of their previous album Time and Tide (1982), which had been a happy time for Split Enz, the band have cited the sessions for Conflicting Emotions as the beginning of their breakup. As recording began, Tim Finn had just released a successful solo album, Escapade, and was focused on promoting it. As a result, six of the ten songs on the album are written and sung by Neil Finn.

The rumored resentment over Tim Finn's successful solo career was worsened by his desire to downplay drummer/percussionist Noel Crombie during the sessions, by bringing in former Beach Boy Ricky Fataar, who had played on Escapade, to play drums on "Message to My Girl", and using a drum machine on most other tracks. Hence, although Crombie is credited as drummer/percussionist on the album liner notes, he actually contributed very little drumming. Neil Finn said at the time of recording, "These drum machine things that are going around at the moment. We thought it was high time we utilised one and we've been very careful with it." Neil later expressed regret over the downplaying of Crombie during the sessions, and grew to dislike the sound and feel of the drum machine on the album.

Eddie Rayner at this point started to use the Yamaha DX7 synthesizer which can be heard on many tracks. The 'guitar' solo on "Strait Old Line" is actually Rayner on the DX7.

Before taking to the road for the Conflicting Emotions tour, Crombie moved back to his original percussionist role in the band, and they advertised for a new drummer, hoping an injection of new blood would revitalize them. Paul Hester answered the call, joining Split Enz in time to feature in the video clip for "Message to My Girl".

The album cover art was painted by former Split Enz frontman Phil Judd, while the back cover was painted by Noel Crombie.

== Track listing ==
All tracks are written by Neil Finn except where noted.

Side one
No.	Title	Writer(s)	Length
1.	"Strait Old Line"		4:03
2.	"Bullet Brain and Cactus Head"		3:59
3.	"Message to My Girl"		4:04
4.	"Working Up an Appetite"	Tim Finn	4:08
5.	"Our Day"		4:57
Total length:			21:11

Side two
No.	Title	Writer(s)	Length
6.	"No Mischief"		4:15
7.	"The Devil You Know"		3:35
8.	"I Wake Up Every Night"	T. Finn	4:46
9.	"Conflicting Emotions"	T. Finn	4:30
10.	"Bon Voyage"	T. Finn	4:06
Total length:			21:12 42:23

== Personnel ==
Personnel as listed in the album's liner notes are:

=== Split Enz ===
- Neil Finn – vocals, guitar, piano
- Tim Finn – vocals, guitar, piano, keyboards
- Noel Crombie – vocals, percussion, drums, back cover artwork
- Nigel Griggs – vocals, bass guitar
- Eddie Rayner – keyboards, Yamaha DX7 and machines, production, engineering

=== Additional musicians ===
- Ricky Fataar – drums (track 3)

=== Production ===
- Hugh Padgham — production, engineering
- David Price — engineering
- Phil Judd — front cover artwork
- Karen McGregor — artwork

== Charts ==
=== Weekly charts ===
Chart (1983–84)	Peak position
Australian Albums (Kent Music Report)	13
Dutch Albums (Album Top 100)	18
New Zealand Albums (RMNZ)	3
US Billboard 200	137

=== Year-end charts ===
Chart (1984)	Position
New Zealand Albums (RMNZ)	42

== Certifications ==
Region	Certification	Certified units/sales
Australia (ARIA)	Gold	35,000^{^}
New Zealand (RMNZ)	Platinum	15,000^{^}
^{^} Shipments figures based on certification alone.
