= Strait Old Line =

Single by Split Enz

from the album Conflicting Emotions
- B-side: "Parasite"
- Released: October 1983
- Recorded: 1983
- Genre: Pop, rock
- Length: 4:03
- Label: Mushroom Records
- Songwriter: Neil Finn

Split Enz singles chronology
"Next Exit" (1983)	"Strait Old Line" (1983)	"Message to My Girl" (1984)

"Strait Old Line" is a song by New Zealand group Split Enz, released in October 1983 as the lead single from their album Conflicting Emotions.

Neil Finn described the song as, "about ambition, temptation, being distracted, following your nose and not letting anything get in your way". The jazz guitar solo halfway through the song is actually Eddie Rayner playing a guitar preset on a Yamaha DX7 synthesizer.

In order to achieve the slow motion effect in the music video, the band members mimed with their instruments while the song was played back at double speed.

== Track listing ==
1. "Strait Old Line" - 4:03
2. "Parasite" - 3:37

== Personnel ==
- Neil Finn - vocals, guitar, piano
- Tim Finn - vocals, guitar, piano, keyboards
- Noel Crombie - vocals, percussion, drums
- Nigel Griggs - vocals, bass
- Eddie Rayner - keyboards and machines

== Charts ==
Chart (1983/84)	Peak position
Australia (Kent Music Report)	42
New Zealand (Recorded Music NZ)	15
