= One Step Ahead (Split Enz song) =

Single by Split Enz

from the album Waiata (aka Coroborree)
- B-side: "In the Wars"
- Released: November 1980
- Recorded: AAV Studios, Melbourne, 1980
- Genre: New wave, rock
- Length: 2:52
- Label: Mushroom
- Songwriter: Neil Finn
- Producer: David Tickle

Split Enz singles chronology
"Poor Boy" (1980)	"One Step Ahead" (1980)	"History Never Repeats" (1981)

"One Step Ahead" is a song by New Zealand art rock group Split Enz. It was released November 1980 as the lead single from their sixth studio album Waiata.

After Split Enz's dissolution in 1984, singer and composer Neil Finn continued to perform "One Step Ahead" with his next group Crowded House, in particular, the group performed the song live at their 1987 concert in Daytona known as Spring Break '87.

The single's B-side, "In the Wars" was recorded in the Waiata recording sessions, but it was not originally released as a track on the album, though it was later appended as track twelve in the album's 2006 re-release.

== Music video ==
The video clip for the song was one of the first ever videos screened on MTV. In a documentary for Radio New Zealand, Neil Finn expressed surprise at the song's success, stating that it "hasn't got a proper chorus".

The video starts with Neil Finn walking down a blue and red staircase and continuing to walk through a hallway with different coloured walls and shadows of what seems to be other members of the band playing instruments. He then enters a room with the five members.

The video clip for "One Step Ahead" has keyboardist Eddie Rayner performing "Marche sur place", the pantomime illusion walk created by Decroux and Barrault (seen in the 1945 French film Children of Paradise) that is the technique Michael Jackson would base his moonwalk on in 1983.

== Track listings ==
1. "One Step Ahead" – 2:51
2. "In the Wars" – 3:32

== Personnel ==
- Neil Finn – vocals and guitar
- Tim Finn – backing vocals
- Noel Crombie – percussion
- Eddie Rayner – keyboards
- Malcolm Green – drums
- Nigel Griggs – bass guitar

== Charts ==
=== Weekly charts ===
Weekly chart performance for "One Step Ahead"
Chart (1980–1981)	Peak position
Australia (Kent Music Report)	5
Canada (CBC) (Note: The single reached 16 on the CHUM Chart, 17 on the CBC Singles Chart, and 17 on the RPM Top Singles Chart.)	17
New Zealand (Recorded Music NZ)	6
US Bubbling Under Hot 100 Singles	104

=== Year-end charts ===
Year-end chart performance for "One Step Ahead"
Chart (1981)	Position
Australia (Kent Music Report)	42
New Zealand (RIANZ)	45

== External resources ==
- "One Step Ahead" Music video on YouTube
