= Six Months in a Leaky Boat =

Single by Split Enz

from the album Time and Tide
- B-side: "Fire Drill"
- Released: May 1982
- Genre: Pop, rock
- Length: 4:21 (album version); 3:48 (single version); 3:14 (US single version)
- Label: Mushroom Records
- Songwriters: Tim Finn, Split Enz
- Producers: Hugh Padgham, Split Enz

Split Enz singles chronology
"Dirty Creature" (1982)	"Six Months in a Leaky Boat" (1982)	"Never Ceases to Amaze Me" (1982)

Music video
- "Six Months in a Leaky Boat" on YouTube

"Six Months in a Leaky Boat" is a song by New Zealand art rock group Split Enz. It was released in May 1982 as the second single from the group's album Time and Tide.

The song became a top-10 hit in Australia, New Zealand, and Canada, and was voted the fifth-best New Zealand song ever in the 2001 Australasian Performing Right Association list. Its chart performance was less successful in the United Kingdom, owing to its release during the Falklands War. Despite being recorded before the outbreak of the conflict, some in Britain considered the song to be veiled criticism of the war with Argentina. The song was removed from many radio playlists in the United Kingdom, including the BBC, because it was considered that references to "leaky boats" were inappropriate during the naval action in the war.

At the 1982 Countdown Music Awards, the song was nominated for Best Australian Single.

== Music video ==
The video, shot in a studio, shows band members dressed in nautical gear and performing the song while piloting a sailboat through stormy weather; in the third minute, the band members spot Māori artists performing traditional Māori poi dance on a sandy, sunny beach, and come ashore to dance with them.

== Track listing ==
Australian/NZ 7" single

1. "Six Months in a Leaky Boat" (edited version) – 3:53
2. "Fire Drill" – 3:53

US/European 7" single

1. "Six Months in a Leaky Boat" – 3:05
2. "Make Sense of It" – 3:30

== Personnel ==
- Tim Finn – vocals, piano
- Neil Finn – vocals, guitar
- Noel Crombie – drums, percussion
- Nigel Griggs – bass
- Eddie Rayner – keyboards, percussion

== Charts ==
=== Weekly charts ===
Chart (1982)	Peak position
Australia (Kent Music Report)	2
Canada (RPM) (Note: The single reached 3 on the CHUM Chart, 7 on the CBC Singles Chart, and 7 on the RPM Top Singles Chart.)	7
New Zealand (Recorded Music NZ)	7
UK Singles Chart	83
US Bubbling Under Hot 100 Singles	104
US Cash Box Top 100	81

=== Year-end charts ===
Chart (1982)	Position
Australia (Kent Music Report)	18
Canada (CHUM Top 100)	40

== Certifications ==
Region	Certification	Certified units/sales
New Zealand (RMNZ)	Platinum	30,000^{‡}
^{‡} Sales+streaming figures based on certification alone.

== Covers ==
- "Six Months in a Leaky Boat" was covered by Australian indie rock band Little Birdy, and appears on the 2005 compilation album She Will Have Her Way. They also played the song during their set at the Sydney Sound Relief concert.
- The song was performed by Ted Leo and released on Tell Balgeary, Balgury Is Dead in 2003. He also occasionally performs the song live. A version recorded with a full band was released on the Sharkbite Sessions EP.
- Australian children's entertainers The Wiggles covered this song on their album/video, It's a Wiggly, Wiggly World, with Tim Finn singing back-up and appearing in the video, but with the lyrics significantly altered to be about Captain Feathersword.
- Tim Finn himself covered a Māori language version of the track ("Ono Marama Takerehāia") in 2022 for the Waiata / Anthems project.

== Legacy ==
The song was voted the fifth-best New Zealand song of all time in 2001 by members of APRA.

The song was used as the funeral song for explorer, environmentalist and sailor Sir Peter Blake, sung by Tim Finn with acoustic guitar, at Blake's service.
