= Waiata (album) =

- New Zealand release

Studio album by Split Enz
- Released: March 1981
- Recorded: 1980
- Studio: AAV Studios (Melbourne)
- Genre: New wave
- Length: 37:36 (1981 release); 41:22 (2006 release)
- Labels: Mushroom, Polydor (Australia & New Zealand); A&M (International)
- Producer: David Tickle

Split Enz chronology
Beginning of the Enz (1980)	Waiata (1981)	Time and Tide (1982)

Alternative cover
- Australian release (Corroboree)

Alternative cover
- International release

Singles from Waiata
- 1. "One Step Ahead" Released: November 1980; 2. "History Never Repeats" Released: March 1981; 3. "I Don't Wanna Dance" Released: June 1981

Professional ratings
Review scores
Source	Rating
AllMusic	3.5/5 stars
Robert Christgau	C+
The New Rolling Stone Record Guide	3./5 stars

Waiata, released as Corroboree in Australia, is the sixth studio album by New Zealand new wave band Split Enz, released in March 1981. Waiata is the Māori term for song and singing, while corroboree is an Aboriginal term. According to Noel Crombie the intention was to name the album using a word from the natives of every country it was released in. This did not go ahead and the only country to adopt this change was Australia. The original New Zealand title was retained on international releases.

The songs "History Never Repeats" and "One Step Ahead" were among the first music videos aired on MTV when the cable television channel launched in the United States in 1981.

== Track listings ==
All tracks are written by Tim Finn except where noted.

Side one
No.	Title	Writer(s)	Length
1.	"Hard Act to Follow"		3:17
2.	"One Step Ahead"	Neil Finn	2:52
3.	"I Don't Wanna Dance"		3:34
4.	"Iris"	N. Finn	2:50
5.	"Wail" (instrumental)	Eddie Rayner	2:49
6.	"Clumsy"		3:29
Total length:			18:51

Side two
No.	Title	Writer(s)	Length
7.	"History Never Repeats"	N. Finn	3:00
8.	"Walking Through the Ruins"		4:15
9.	"Ships"	N. Finn	3:01
10.	"Ghost Girl"		4:26
11.	"Albert of India" (instrumental)	Rayner	4:03
Total length:			18:45 37:36

=== 2006 remaster ===
The 2006 remaster featured an alternate track listing and the bonus track "In the Wars", the B-side of the single release of "One Step Ahead".

2006 remaster for digital and CD releases
No.	Title	Writer(s)	Length
1.	"Hard Act to Follow"		3:21
2.	"History Never Repeats"	N. Finn	2:59
3.	"I Don't Wanna Dance"		3:34
4.	"One Step Ahead"	N. Finn	2:51
5.	"Walking Through the Ruins"		4:07
6.	"Wail" (instrumental)	Rayner	2:49
7.	"Iris"	N. Finn	2:51
8.	"Clumsy"		3:32
9.	"Ghost Girl"		4:39
10.	"Ships"	N. Finn	3:03
11.	"Albert of India" (instrumental)	Rayner	4:03
12.	"In the Wars"		3:33
Total length:			41:22

== Personnel ==
Personnel as listed in the album's liner notes are:

=== Split Enz ===
- Tim Finn – vocals
- Neil Finn – vocals, guitar
- Noel Crombie – percussion
- Malcolm Green – drums
- Nigel Griggs – bass
- Edward Rayner – vocals, keyboards

=== Production ===
- David Tickle — engineering, production
- Scott Hemming — engineering

== Charts ==
=== Weekly charts ===
Chart (1981)	Peak position
Australia (Kent Music Report)	1
Canada (RPM)	17
New Zealand Albums (RMNZ)	1
US Top LPs & Tape (Billboard)	45

=== Year-end charts ===
Chart (1981)	Peak position
Australia (Kent Music Report)	10
New Zealand Albums (RMNZ)	3
Canadian Albums (RPM)	67

== See also ==
- List of Top 25 albums for 1981 in Australia

== Certifications and sales ==
Region	Certification	Certified units/sales
Australia (ARIA)	3× Platinum	210,000^{^}
Canada (Music Canada)	Platinum	100,000^{^}
^{^} Shipments figures based on certification alone.
