= Second Thoughts (album) =

Studio album by Split Enz
- Released: August 1976 (AUS & NZ); September 1976 (UK); January 1977 (US)
- Recorded: April–May 1976
- Studio: Basing Street
- Genre: Progressive rock
- Length: 41:48
- Labels: Mushroom (AUS/NZ); Chrysalis (overseas)
- Producer: Phil Manzanera

Split Enz chronology
Mental Notes (1975)	Second Thoughts (1976)	Dizrythmia (1977)

Alternative cover
- European / North American release (Mental Notes)

Professional ratings
Review scores
Source	Rating
AllMusic	4/5 stars

Second Thoughts is the second studio album by New Zealand art rock band Split Enz. It was recorded in London with Roxy Music's guitarist Phil Manzanera producing the album.

The band's first album Mental Notes had not originally been released outside Australasia, therefore Second Thoughts was the band's first album release in Europe and North America. In both territories, the album was titled Mental Notes and featured a different album cover, which was a reworked version of the original Mental Notes cover. In the reworked cover, Wally Wilkinson's image was replaced with that of Robert Gillies, and some band members were shown with newer haircuts: Phil Judd was now bald, and Tim Finn had his sides shaved.

== Track listing ==
All tracks are written by Phil Judd and Tim Finn except where noted.

Side one
No.	Title	Writer(s)	Length
1.	"Late Last Night"	Judd	4:03
2.	"Walking Down a Road" (*)		5:22
3.	"Titus" (*)	Judd	3:15
4.	"Lovey Dovey" (†)		3:06
5.	"Sweet Dreams"	Judd	5:04
Total length:			20:50

Side two
No.	Title	Writer(s)	Length
6.	"Stranger Than Fiction" (*)		7:07
7.	"Time for a Change" (*)	Judd	4:05
8.	"Matinee Idyll"		2:56
9.	"The Woman Who Loves You" (†)		6:50
Total length:			20:58 41:48

Bonus track on Europe and North America release
No.	Title	Writer(s)	Length
10.	"Mental Notes"	Judd	0:34

Track notes

- "Late Last Night" was initially a non-album single in April 1976 (in-between Mental Notes and Second Thoughts), the song was re-recorded for Second Thoughts.
- Tracks denoted with an asterisk (*) are re-recordings of songs that first appeared on Mental Notes. Tracks denoted with a cross (†) were recorded during the Mental Notes sessions but were not included on that album, and were re-recorded for Second Thoughts.
- A 1974 demo of "Lovey Dovey" was released on the 1979 album The Beginning of the Enz.
- "Matinee Idyll", under its original title "129", had been the B-side of the band's second single "Sweet Talkin' Spoon Song" in 1973, and was re-recorded for Second Thoughts. The original version appears on The Beginning of the Enz.
- The Europe and North America release includes "Mental Notes" as a bonus track.

== Personnel ==
Personnel as listed in the album's liner notes are:

=== Split Enz ===
- Phil Judd – vocals, guitars, mandolin
- Edward Rayner – keyboards
- Mike Chunn – bass, piano (track 3)
- Tim Finn – vocals, piano (track 6)
- Noel Crombie – percussion
- Robert Gillies – saxophone, trumpet
- Emlyn Crowther – drums

=== Additional musicians ===
- Miles Golding – violin (tracks 6, 8)
- Ian Sharp – cello (8)

=== Production ===
- Phil Manzanera – production
- Rhett Davies – recording and mixing
- Guy Bidmead — mixing
- John Prew – cover photography

== Charts ==
Chart (1976)	Peak position
Australia (Kent Music Report)	25
New Zealand Albums (RMNZ)	18
