= Chris Gough =

Chris Gough is the managing director of Mana Music and Native Tongue, a music publishing company with offices in Australia and New Zealand. Writers signed to Native Tongue include Don McGlashan, David Long and Philip Judd.

Before starting Mana Music Publishing in 1990, he was a journalist, owned a studio, managed bands such as Schnell Fenster and The Makers and was a music supervisor.

"It was no small fortuity for the band [Schnell Fenster] to have accrued management in the form of Chris Gough, who also runs Melbourne's Platinum Studios where they could work at will." – Schnell Fenster: Tying Up Loose Enz, Rolling Stone, September 1988

== Music Supervision ==
=== Films ===
Chris Gough was music supervisor on the following:

- Heavenly Creatures (1994)
- Muriel's Wedding (1994)
- River Street (1996)
- Mr. Reliable (1996)
- Heaven (1998)
- Amy (1998)
- Two Hands (1999)
- No. 2 (2006)
- Sione's Wedding (2006)

He is credited as music co-ordinator on the following:

- The Big Steal (1990)
- Braindead (1992)
- The Last Tattoo (1994)
- Bread & Roses (1994)

=== TV ===
- SeaChange (1998)
- The Strip (2002–2004)
- CrashBurn (2003)
