= The Big Steal (1990 film) =

- Theatrical poster
- Directed by: Nadia Tass
- Written by: David Parker
- Produced by: David Parker; Nadia Tass; Bryce Menzies; Tim White
- Starring: Ben Mendelsohn; Claudia Karvan; Steve Bisley; Marshall Napier; Damon Herriman
- Cinematography: David Parker
- Edited by: Peter Carrodus
- Music by: Chris Gough; Philip Judd
- Distributed by: Hoyts Distribution
- Release date: 20 September 1990
- Running time: 99 minutes
- Country: Australia
- Language: English
- Budget: $2.3 million
- Box office: $2,351,628 (Australia)

The Big Steal, working title Mark Clark Van Ark, is a 1990 Australian teen comedy film set in Melbourne, Australia, directed by Nadia Tass and starring Ben Mendelsohn, Claudia Karvan, and Steve Bisley. David Parker was the scriptwriter and cinematographer. The film won three Australian Film Institute awards.

== Plot ==
18-year-old Danny Clark, a young man living in Footscray, a suburb of Melbourne, is looking to increase his cool factor in order to secure the affections of Joanna.

Danny offers to take Joanna out for a ride in a Jaguar as a way to impress her, but his actual vehicle is a 1963 Nissan Cedric which Danny knows is not 'cool'. In need of a Jaguar in a hurry, Danny decides to trade the Nissan Cedric for a more impressive car.

Gordon Farkas, a crooked used car salesman, tricks Danny into buying a 1973 Jaguar XJ6. The Jaguar engine, true to form, blows up. After a confrontation which culminates with Joanna leaving Danny, an investigation of the engine reveals it has been swapped by Gordon Farkas. Danny sets about seeking justice and winning back Joanna's affections.

Danny and friends trick Gordon while his car is parked in a multi-storey car park, and put the blown up engine in Gordon's Jaguar. Gordon, drunk, drives off without realising. He is arrested for going through a red light and for being drunk. Danny now has a perfect 4.2 l Jaguar to impress Joanna, which he does briefly when her parents are away for the weekend, until they return and surprise them with a new car for Joanna, and Danny flees.

Everything unravels when Gordon mistakenly believes that Joanna's father has stolen his Jaguar engine and steals that car in error, defacing it, later getting his comeuppance. Various car chases result in Gordon failing to catch Danny and his friends, as well getting violently beatin' up by Mr. Johnson's friends, and a postscript shows Gordon serving five years in Pentridge prison for 37 offences against the Motor Traders Act, then moved to Queensland intending to start a business there after his release, Danny and Joanna getting married later that year, and his friends in their ideal jobs in computing and car sales, While Danny's parents got their beloved Nissan Cedric back and Joanna's parents spent years avoiding them.

== Cast ==
- Ben Mendelsohn as Danny Clark
- Claudia Karvan as Joanna Johnson
- Steve Bisley as Gordon Farkas
- Marshall Napier as Desmond Clark
- Damon Herriman as Mark Jorgensen
- Angelo D'Angelo as Vangeli Petrakis
- Tim Robertson as Desmond Johnson
- Maggie King as Edith Clark
- Sheryl Munks as Pam Schaeffer
- Lise Rodgers as Mrs. Johnson
- Frankie J. Holden as Frank
- Mark Hennessy as Jimmy
- Roy Edmunds as George
- Reg Gorman as Neighbour

== Production ==
The film was originally known as Mark Clark Van Ark. There were problems raising the money so Tass and Parker mortgaged their house with ANZ Bank, as they did with their first film. Tim White, who had also collaborated on the two previous Tass/Parker films Malcolm (1986) and Rikky and Pete (1988) co-produced the film.

The movie was shot from 6 November to 22 December 1989.

Cars appearing in the film included:

- 1973 Jaguar XJ6
- 1963 Nissan Cedric
- 1974 HJ Monaro GTS coupe
- 1989 Nissan Pintara
- 1973 Chevrolet Caprice Classic
- 1972 Volvo 144

== Soundtrack ==
Music was by Chris Gough and Philip Judd.

The film includes songs by Philip Judd and Tim Finn, the Makers, Schnell Fenster, Boom Crash Opera, Mental As Anything, Bang The Drum, the Breaknecks, Big Storm, and the Front Lawn.

== Box office ==
The Big Steal grossed $2,351,628 at the box office in Australia.

== Awards ==
| Award | Category | Subject | Result |
|---|---|---|---|
| AACTA Awards (1990 AFI Awards) | Best Film | Nadia Tass | Nominated |
| AACTA Awards (1990 AFI Awards) | Best Film | David Parker | Nominated |
| AACTA Awards (1990 AFI Awards) | Best Screenplay, Original or Adapted | David Parker | Won |
| AACTA Awards (1990 AFI Awards) | Best Actor | Ben Mendelsohn | Nominated |
| AACTA Awards (1990 AFI Awards) | Best Actress | Claudia Karvan | Nominated |
| AACTA Awards (1990 AFI Awards) | Best Supporting Actor | Steve Bisley | Won |
| AACTA Awards (1990 AFI Awards) | Best Supporting Actress | Maggie King | Nominated |
| AACTA Awards (1990 AFI Awards) | Best Original Music Score | Philip Judd | Won |
| AACTA Awards (1990 AFI Awards) | Best Sound | Dean Gawen | Nominated |
| AACTA Awards (1990 AFI Awards) | Best Sound | John Wilkinson | Nominated |
| AACTA Awards (1990 AFI Awards) | Best Production Design | Paddy Reardon | Nominated |

== Home media ==
The Big Steal was released on DVD by Umbrella Entertainment in October 2003. The DVD is compatible with all region codes and includes special features such as the original theatrical trailer, Umbrella Entertainment trailers, original cast audition tapes, interviews with Nadia Tass, David Parker, Ben Mendelsohn, Claudia Karvan and Steve Bisley as well as audio commentary by Nadia Tass and David Parker.

Umbrella Entertainment released The Big Steal on Blu-ray in September 2021. The Blu-ray is compatible with all region codes, retains the extra features from the DVD release, and includes a new audio commentary by David Parker, moderated by film buff Paul Harris.
