= Ok Alright a Huh Oh Yeah =

Ok Alright A Huh Oh Yeah

Studio album by Schnell Fenster
- Released: July 1991
- Genre: Rock
- Length: 45.57
- Label: Atlantic
- Producer: Schnell Fenster

Schnell Fenster chronology
The Sound of Trees (1988)	Ok Alright A Huh Oh Yeah (1991)

Professional ratings
Review scores
Source	Rating
Allmusic	2.5/5 stars

Ok Alright A Huh Oh Yeah is the second and final album by Schnell Fenster. It was released only in Australia and New Zealand. The album peaked at number 117 in July 1991

== Track listing ==
- All tracks by Schnell Fenster unless otherwise noted
1. "Ok Alright A Huh Oh Yeah"
2. "Happy Feet" (music: Judd)
3. "Fun City" (music: Den Elzen)
4. "Hot Body" (music: Den Elzen, Judd)
5. "Fire Ball"
6. "Heroes Let You Down"
7. "Rebecca" (music: Den Elzen, Judd)
8. "Same Boat"
9. "Buried Alive"
10. "Vivid Imagination"
11. "Black Flower"

== Personnel ==
Schnell Fenster

- Phil Judd - guitar, keyboards, vocals; drum programming on "Happy Feet", trumpet on "Heroes Let You Down"
- Nigel Griggs - bass guitar, backing vocals
- Noel Crombie - drums, percussion, backing vocals
- Michael den Elzen - guitars, keyboards, drum programming, backing vocals; bass on "Fun City"

with:

- Venetta Fields - backing vocals

== Charts ==
Chart (1991)	Peak position
Australian Albums (ARIA Charts)	117
