= Sue-Anne Webster =

Australian magician, actor and writer

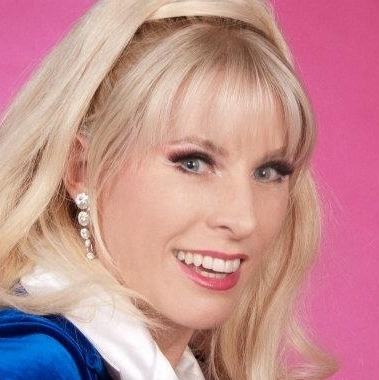
- Born: Sydney, Australia
- Occupations: Magician, illusionist, publisher, producer
- Spouse: Geoffrey McSkimming (author)
- Website: www.9diamondspress.com/magic

Sue-Anne Webster is an Australian magician, actor and writer who has been recognised internationally for her contributions to the art of magic.

== Biography ==
Sue-Anne Webster trained as an actor at The Australian Playhouse Studio and The Actor's Centre in Sydney, and was Assistant Director at the Australian Broadcasting Corporation for programs including Beatbox and the mini-series Tusitala. She has performed as an actor on television programs including Real Life, The Masters, and several television commercials. She has performed as an illusionist on television programs including The Price Is Right, Location Location Amazing Homes, StarStruck, Today, Mornings with Kerri-Anne, Good Morning Australia with Bert Newton, Fox Morning News (USA), Top Billing (South Africa), The 23rd FISM World Championships of Magic Stockholm 2006 (UK), WB Kids, ETV (Hong Kong), and Nadia Tass's Australian feature film Matching Jack (2010).

Theatrical and magical shows which Sue-Anne Webster has created and directed include: Cunning Stunts, Dreams & Illusions, Magic Unlimited's Best Show Ever, Wizards of Aus, Illusionarium, and Private Eye.

In addition, Webster is one of two living Australian magicians to be included in the book Dictionnaire de la Prestidigitation covering the world history of the art of magic, and is the only Australian to be included in Historias de Magas Antiguas y Modernas, an international history book of prominent female magicians throughout history. Webster is the founder and first president of the Australian Institute of Magic.

In 2001, Sue-Anne Webster and Tim Ellis were voted Most Valuable Performers by their peers at the close up magic convention Fechter's Finger Flicking Frolic in Batavia, New York. In 2005 was the duo were nominated Lecturers of the Year by the Academy of Magical Arts at The Magic Castle in Hollywood.

Webster has frequently worked as a consultant on magic for television including The Panel and Blue Heelers.

== Author ==
From 2010 to 2012, Webster wrote a regular magic column in the NSW School Magazine, the oldest literary magazine for children in the world. Her writings in the magic world include contributions to Magic Magazine and Genii. She has also had many articles published in New Idea, Reader's Digest, That's Life! and Australian Geographic. Her magic book, Astounding: Quick, Slick Magic Tricks, was published in 2017.

== I Dream of Jeannie ==
Webster is also the official I Dream of Jeannie 'Jeannie' lookalike for www.IDreamOfJeannie.com and is recognised internationally for her uncanny characterisation. In 2009, she presented an 'I Dream of Jeannie Tribute Show' at the Melbourne Magic Festival.

== Theatre ==
She premiered two shows in 2008, one for The Melbourne International Comedy Festival Illusionarium with Ellis & Webster and The Wizards of Aus at The Melbourne Magic Festival, and many more shows including Ellis in Wonderland (2009), Illusionarium 2010 and I Dream of Jeannie solo (2010), Once Upon A Time..., and Secrets (2011), Phyllis Wong and the Forgotten Secrets of Mr Okyto magic performances at promotional appearances with author and husband Geoffrey McSkimming.

== Publishing ==
In 2016 she co-founded 9 Diamonds Press which publishes tales of magic, mystery, adventure and verse. Her magic book, Astounding: Quick, Slick Magic Tricks, was published in 2017. Sue-Anne also produces the book trailers and graphic designs for titles published by 9 Diamonds Press.

Sue-Anne is the magic consultant for the Phyllis Wong time detective novels which feature a young girl magician. This series is popular worldwide and Sue-Anne lends her experience to the authenticity of the magic depicted in the stories.

== Awards and honours ==
- Queen's Scout Award (1981)
- Nominated Lecturers of the Year (with Tim Ellis) - The Magic Castle, Hollywood (2005)
- Guinness World Record (with team of Melbourne magicians) - World's Longest Magic Show, 75 hours (2004)
- Best Stage Magic Act in Australia - National Australian Magic Convention (2004)
- Most Valuable Participants (with Tim Ellis) - Fechter's Finger Flicking Frolic, New York (2001)
- Silver Medal, Stage Magic - National Australian Magic Convention (1999)
- Best Actress Award, Ignite Film Festival (2008)
- Best Actress Award, Ignite Film Festival (2010)

== Published works ==
- AMM 2000 - Monthly National Magazine, Co Editor with Tim Ellis(2000)
- Ellis in Wonderland - Lecture Notes (2000)
- 24 Years of Living Next Door to Ellis (2001)
- Have You Ever Thought About School Tours? - Lecture Notes (2001)

== Videos & DVDs ==
- Ellis in Wonderland (2004)
- 24 Years of Living Next Door to Ellis (2004)
- Runaround Sue (2004)
- Ellis & Webster's Cunning Stunts (2006)
- Ellis & Webster's Most Amazing Magic Volume 1
- Ellis & Webster's Most Amazing Magic Volume 2
