= Tim Ellis (magician) =

Australian magician

- Born: Melbourne
- Occupations: Magician, illusionist, publisher, producer
- Website: www.timellismagic.com

Tim Ellis is an Australian performer, author and lecturer in the world of magic and illusion.

== Biography ==
Ellis was born in Melbourne. He began performing magic at the age of nine after his grandfather gave him a magic set as a gift. At the age of 14 he was the youngest magician ever admitted to The Magic Circle of Victoria and two years later won four out of their five annual awards. In 1980, he won the title 'Best Under 18 Magician of Australia'.

In 1986, he created and produced 'National Magic Week', a ten-day festival of the magical arts which was presented annually for the next nine years. In 1989, Ellis made national headlines when he locked himself in a crate, sealed it with chains, and was dropped into the Yarra River to promote Magic Week.

Ellis produced and edited Australian Magic Monthly, a national publication for magicians which came out monthly for 100 issues, while writing a regular column on the Australian magic scene for the international Genii.

Ellis was married to Kristina Todorovich from 1990 to 1998.

Ellis created 'MagicSports' a form of improvised magic games based on Keith Johnstone's 'Theatre Sports'.

In 1992 he bought Australia's oldest magic shop, 'Bernard's Magic Shop' which he owned for several years.

In 1994 he was awarded second place in 'Micro Magic' at the FISM World Magic Championship in Yokohama, Japan. This followed the 'Special Prize of the Jury' he was awarded at the 1991 FISM in Lausanne, Switzerland for his 'Six Card Rap'.

Ellis was married to Sue-Anne Webster from 1998 to 2011. Ellis performed as a guest artist at the FISM World Championship of Magic, performing in the Close Up Gala in 2000 and the Stage Gala in 2003. In 2001, Ellis and Webster were voted 'Most Valuable Performers' by their peers at the close up magic convention 'Fechter's Finger Flicking Frolic' in Batavia, New York.

Ellis sat on the jury at the FISM World Championship of Magic in 2003 at Den Haag, in 2006 at Stockholm, and 2009 in Beijing. In 2004 Ellis and Webster produced three magic teaching DVDs, and together with a team of Melbourne magicians they set a new Guinness World Record for the world's longest magic show by performing non-stop for 75 hours at Luna Park, Melbourne, Australia. The previous record was 24 hours. In the same year Ellis produced the 29th Australian Convention of Magicians.

In 2007 Ellis was diagnosed with Asperger syndrome.

After the 2007 show Poker in the Face, Ellis presented two shows for the 2008 Melbourne International Comedy Festival Illusionarium with Ellis & Webster and Something About Needles & Razorblades. Later that year he performed The Wizards of Aus at The Melbourne Magic Festival. The 2009 Festival saw his new shows AspyCadabra, and Ellis in Wonderland performed with Sue-Anne Webster. The 2010 Festival saw two new shows Escape From Reality and Illusionarium 2010 and in 2011 they premiered Once Upon A Time... 2012 his solo shows The Mad Hatter's Magical Tea Party and Timeless Magic followed by three new shows in 2013 The Mad Hatter's History of Hattery, As Seen on TV and In Dreams. In 2014 he presented the improvised show Magic vs Music: The Audience Always Wins and 1 Defining Moment as well as Immaculate Deceptions for the Bally On High Festival. At the 2015 Melbourne Magic Festival he presented The Mad Hatter: Return to Wonderland and the poker themed show Full House, as well as producing MagicSports which won the Melbourne International Comedy Festival Award for 'Funniest Show'. At the 2016 Festival he presented This Is Magic and an updated version of In Dreams. For 2017 This Is Magic returned and his popular character from Young Talent Time was resurrected in the show Professor Googalfitz Explains it All. In 2018 the Festival moved to the Melba Spiegeltent and Tim teamed with Carisa Hendrix to present the show World of Wizards and also performed The Late Night Magic, Comedy & Something Ellis Hour and Spellbinder at The Laneway Theatre. In 2019 he presented The Mad Hatter's Magical Tea Party and As Seen on TV. Due to the Coronavirus Pandemic, the 2020 Melbourne Magic Festival was cancelled and Tim spent most of the year performing 50 shows via Zoom.

Tim is the artistic director and founder of the Melbourne Magic Festival and as of July 2022 president of The Australian Institute of Magic.

He has performed on television programs including Midday, Good Morning Australia, The Daryl Somers Show, Young Talent Time, Hey Hey It's Saturday, Sunrise, and The Today Show. He also appears in Nadia Tass's feature film Matching Jack (2010).

== Works ==
=== Stage shows ===
Year	Show	Dates	Notes
1981-84	The Magic Club - A Musical Magical	1981 to 1984	An ensemble cast of teenage magicians performed at various Melbourne theatres
1984	Magic Unlimited	1984	School show toured for the Victorian Arts Council
1987	Illusion: The Ultimate Fantasy	October	Caulfield Arts Centre
1987	The Wind In The Willows	Jan to Mar	The Australian Shakespeare Company in the Melbourne Botanical Gardens
1989	Spellbinder	1989	School show toured for the Victorian Arts Council
1989	The Greatest Show At The Show	September	With Peter Gray and Christof at the Royal Melbourne Show
1989	Cunning Stunts	Four Month Season	The Comedy Cafe, Melbourne
1990	Pure Magic	Jan to Feb	A close up magic show at The Victorian Arts Centre
1991	Dreamweaver	1991	School show toured for the Victorian Arts Council
1993	Dreams & Illusions	December	Pitrone's Cabaret Restaurant, Melbourne
1994	Pure Magic	1994	School show toured for the Victorian Arts Council
1995	International Stars of Magic	1995	Burswood Casino, Perth
1998	Dreams & Illusions	1998	Capers Dinner Theatre, Melbourne
1999-2000	Magic Unlimited's Best Show Ever	1999 to 2000	School Show toured throughout Victoria and Tasmania
2000	Cunning Stunts	April	Melbourne International Comedy Festival
2004	Magic Concert	2004	With Eun Gyeol Lee in Seoul, South Korea
2007	Poker In The Face	April	Melbourne International Comedy Festival
2008	Something About Needles & Razorblades	April	Melbourne International Comedy Festival
2008	Illusionarium	April	Melbourne International Comedy Festival
2008	The Wizards of Aus	Sep 22 to Oct 4	The Melbourne Magic Festival
2008	Something About Needles & Razorblades	October	The Melbourne Magic Festival
2009	Aspycadabra	July 8 to 11	The Melbourne Magic Festival
2009	Ellis in Wonderland	June 29 to July 4	The Melbourne Magic Festival
2010	Two Out Of A Hat	September	Northcote Kids Festival
2010	Wow Magic On Earth	March	Hong Kong
2010	Illusionarium 2010	June 28 to July 10	The Melbourne Magic Festival
2010	Escape From Reality	July 7 to 10	The Melbourne Magic Festival
2011	Something About Needles & Razorblades	May	IMX, Las Vegas
2011	Something About Needles & Razorblades	July	The Melbourne Magic Festival
2011	Once Upon A Time	July 4 to 16	The Melbourne Magic Festival
2012	Timeless Magic	July 3 to 11	The Melbourne Magic Festival
2012	The Mad Hatter's Magical Tea Party	July 2 to 15	The Melbourne Magic Festival
2013	The Mad Hatter's History of Hattery	July 1 to 6	The Melbourne Magic Festival
2013	As Seen On TV	July 8 to 12	The Melbourne Magic Festival
2013	In Dreams	July 8 to 13	The Melbourne Magic Festival
2014	Magic vs Music	June 30 to July 5	The Melbourne Magic Festival
2014	1 Defining Moment	July 8 to 11	The Melbourne Magic Festival
2014	Immaculate Deceptions	Nov to Dec	The Bally On High Festival
2015	Full House	July 7 to 11	The Melbourne Magic Festival
2015	The Mad Hatter - Return To Wonderland	June 29 to July 3	The Melbourne Magic Festival
2016	MagicSports	April	The Melbourne International Comedy Festival
2016	This Is Magic!	July 4 to 8	The Melbourne Magic Festival
2016	In Dreams	July 5 to 9	The Melbourne Magic Festival
2017	This Is Magic!	July 4 to 8	The Melbourne Magic Festival
2017	Professor Googalfitz Explains It All	July 3 to 7	The Melbourne Magic Festival
2017-2018	Pure Magic	August to February	The Laneway Theatre
2018	Spellbinder	Feb to August	The Laneway Theatre
2018	World of Wizards	July 3 to 6	The Melbourne Magic Festival
2018	The Late Night Comedy, Magic & Something Ellis Hour	July 10 to 14	The Melbourne Magic Festival
2019	Aspycadabra	March to December	The Laneway Theatre
2019	Astonishment	April to December	The Laneway Theatre
2019	As Seen On TV	July 2 to 6	The Melbourne Magic Festival
2019	The Mad Hatter's Magical Tea Party	July 8 to 13	The Melbourne Magic Festival
2020	Out of Nothing. Something.	Feb to December	The Laneway Theatre
2021	The Laneway Theatre Experience.	Feb to December	The Laneway Theatre
2022	The Magic Menu. Live	Feb to December	The Laneway Theatre
2022	Magicsports vs Theatresports.	July	The Melbourne Magic Festival
2023	Dreamers.	Feb to December	The Laneway Theatre
2023	The Mad Hatter's Magical Tea Party.	July	The Melbourne Magic Festival
2024	The Magic Box.	Feb to December	The Laneway Theatre
2024	These Are A Few Of My Favourite Tricks	July	The Melbourne Magic Festival
2024	Timeless Magic	July	The Noosa Alive Festival

=== Published works ===
Year	Format	Title	Notes
1989-98	Monthly National Magazine	Australian Magic Monthly	Editor and publisher
1992	Monthly Club Magazine	The Magic Circular	Editor
1992	Lecture Notes	The Secret Diary of Tim Ellis	
1993	Teaching Video	Cunning Stunts	
1993-95	Teaching Videos - 18 Volumes	Bernard's Teaching Video Series	Producer
2000	Monthly National Magazine	AMM 2000	Editor and Publisher
2000	Lecture Notes	Ellis in Wonderland	
2001	Lecture Notes	24 Years of Living Next Door To Ellis	
2001	Lecture Notes	Runaround Sue	
2002	Paperback Book	The Two Of Us	Profiled in one chapter
2004	Teaching DVD	Ellis in Wonderland	
2004	Teaching DVD	24 Years of Living Next Door to Ellis	
2004	Teaching DVD	Runaround Sue	
2004	Paperback Book	Eun Gyeol Lee's Book of Magic (First Ever Korean Language Magic Book)	Contributor
2005	Trick	The Tim Card Poker Deal	
2006	Teaching DVD	Ellis & Webster's Cunning Stunts	Bar bets and easy magic for the public
2006	Performance DVD	Ellis & Webster's Most Amazing Magic Volume 1	
2006	Performance DVD	Ellis & Webster's Most Amazing Magic Volume 2	
2006	Hardcover Book	Dictionnaire de la prestidigitation by Jean de Merry & André Ciocca	Profiled in one chapter
2007	Paperback Book	Deception Downunder by Brian McCullagh	Profiled in one chapter
2010	Paperback Book	Magic's Most Amazing Stories by Ivan Amodei	Contributor
2011	Hardcover Book	Timeless Magic	
2012	Paperback Book	Bamboozlers Volume 3 by Diamond Jim Tyler	Contributor
2014	Paperback Book	Who Is Magic Babe Ning by Ning Cai	Contributor
2015	Hardcover Book	The Bammo Ten Card Deal Dossier by Bob Farmer	Contributor
2016	Hardcover Book	Locked by Jim Kleefeld	Contributor
2018	Trick	iDrop by Tim Ellis	Released by Vanishing Inc.

== Awards and honours ==
- Excellence in Magic Award - Melbourne Magic Festival (2017)
- Guinness World Record (with team of Melbourne magicians) – World's Longest Magic Show, 85 hours (2016)
- Melbourne International Comedy Festival Award (for MagicSports) – Melbourne Magic Festival (2015)
- Nominated Lecturers of the Year (with Sue-Anne Webster) – The Magic Castle, Hollywood (2005)
- Guinness World Record (with team of Melbourne magicians) – World's Longest Magic Show, 75 hours (2004)
- Most Valuable Participants (with Sue-Anne Webster) – Fechter's Finger Flicking Frolic, New York (2001)
- Second place, Close Up Magic – FISM World Magic Championships – Yokohama, Japan (1994)
- Special Prize of the Jury – FISM World Magic Championships – Lausanne, Switzerland (1991)
- Best Stage Magic in Australia – National Australian Magic Convention (1990)
- Best Trick – National Australian Magic Convention (1986 & 1990)
- Best Close Up Magician in Australia – National Australian Magic Convention (1986)
- Best Close Up Magician – Ballarat, Newcastle, and Adelaide Magic Conventions (1989)
- Best Card Magician – Adelaide Magic Conventions (1989)
- Teenage Champion Magician of Australia – National Australian Magic Convention (1980)
- Harmony Trophy – Magic Circle of Victoria (1978, 1979)
- Ron Kreyt's Shield for Close Up Magic – Magic Circle of Victoria (1979)
- Improver's Trophy – Magic Circle of Victoria (1979)
- Librarian's Trophy – Magic Circle of Victoria (1979)
