= Sally Patience =

Australian actress

Sally Patience is an Australian actress and one of the country's most prominent voice-over artists. She was born in Melbourne and grew up in the city's south eastern suburbs. She attended the Victorian College of the Arts where she trained as a dancer. Sally Patience worked in the dance field for several years before moving into acting and ultimately voice-over work where she continues to work today.

== Double Take ==
The Double Take shows began in Sydney in 1986 and was part of the dub parody genre in which ostensibly serious films were deliberately re-voiced in a satirical or spoof-like manner. Well-known examples of this genre include the 1960s Jay Ward TV series Fractured Flickers and Woody Allen's What's Up, Tiger Lily? (1966).

Double Take performances featured distinctly Australian voicings (often with exaggerated "Ocker" and ethnic Australian accents) and many local humorous references and the films that the Double Take team sent up were presented in their entirety with scripts were carefully tailored to follow the original sequencing of the movies. Double Take scripts were developed by Des Mangan and Lisa Sweeney and Sally Patience joined much later to become a contributor who provided voices for the films.

Mangan and Patience later gained a strong following around Australia with Double Take shows, which were performed live in a cinema, after Mangan and Sweeney had established the troupe's reputation. Typically seated at the back of the auditorium, using microphones plugged into the cinema's sound system, the Double Take team performed live comedic voice-overs of movies such as the 1935 American science fiction Western movie The Phantom Empire starring Gene Autry, "the Singing Cowboy", the 1953 American film noir crime drama film Dance Hall Racket, the 1968 American B-grade sci-fi film The Astro-Zombies, and the 1965 Italian low-budget 'Sword and Sandal' epic Ercole, Sansone, Maciste e Ursus gli invincibili (i.e., Hercules, Samson, Maciste, and Ursus: the Invincibles). Of necessity much of their voice-over performance was tightly scripted, but working live also allowed the team scope to occasionally insert topical jokes and references.

== Hercules Returns ==
The Double Take show was taken to a new level in the feature film Hercules Returns. Sally Patience played a major role in the movie by contributing to its script and by providing the bulk of the female voices for the film.

The managers of the Hercules Returns project purchased the rights to both the original Ercole film and Mangan's script, hired cinematographer and film maker David Parker to help write a story to wrap around the Double Take routine. The film was Parker's first as a director and the project came in on time and on budget at a cost of less than A$1 million, and shooting was completed in just eight days.

On release of the film Urban Cinefile reported that -

Des Mangan and Sally Patience have travelled the country - and some of the world - performing their unique show, Double Take, to great acclaim. And good houses; they've grossed over a million dollars to date, with shows in all capital cities. It was launched in Sydney in 1986, in a modest sort of way, but two years ago the show settled as a resident of Melbourne.

They put words into people's mouths; new words that LOOK as though they belong on the screen, but in fact have jumped from Des Mangan's rampant, ribald, risky and often riotous imagination.

Similarly, the Mark Takacs in his review of Hercules Returns on the Internet Movie Data Base comments that -

"I've done it. You've probably done it. You're sitting up late one night watching an incredibly *bad* movie of some sort, and you start throwing in your own versions of the lines -- "Don't shoot me yet, I need to flex first!", things like that.

Well, the team "Double Take" (Des Mangan and Sally Patience) has turned this concept into a hilarious and profitable business. It started March 1986 at an underground cinema in Sydney, Australia when they rescripted and redubbed Astro Zombies live to a forty-person audience. A few months later they were playing in Sydney's arthouse theatre, sold out five hours before the show, and turned away 600 people.

Now director David Parker and producer Philip Jaroslow brings the "Double Take" team to the movies with Hercules Returns. There's really only maybe fifteen or twenty minutes of "wrapper" -- the rest of the film is the old Italian movie with double takes redubs and occasional shots of the chaos going on in the projection booth as the characters bustle to provide the live dialogue.

The movie was quite a hit at the `93 Seattle Film Festival, and the audience I saw it with was laughing out loud throughout the movie. The general style makes me want to use adjectives like "madcap" and "zany"; it's certainly not a dark or intellectual comedy. The humor is definitely adult: Hercules grabs the queen's daughter, Labia, which prompts the queen to say "Get your hands off my Labia!" The original incredibly bad Italian sets (really fake looking leftover stuff) also adds to the fun."

The lead actors who appeared on screen in Hercules Returns were well known to local Australian audiences. Bruce Spence has been one of the country's most prominent stage and screen actors since the early 1970s. Mary Coustas was a member of the popular "Wogs Out of Work" team, where she created her Greek-Australian character "Effie", and she co-starred in the popular TV sitcom Acropolis Now. David Argue was well known from his many live comedy, TV and film appearances. Director David Parker has had a long association with writer-director Nadia Tass and they have collaborated on many popular films including Malcolm. Hercules Returns is also notable as the last screen credit for veteran actor Frank Thring (who performed the voice of Zeus) and there are also cameo appearances by Australian film critics David Stratton, Margaret Pomeranz and Ivan Hutchinson.

Ironically, the 'real' stars of the film, Des Mangan and Sally Patience, do not appear on screen in the movie and their voice-overs are instead mimed by Argue, Spence and Coustas. When revoiced for the sound track for the film The voice over artists Included argue who provided Diolouge for a character. Mathew king voiced Frank thring, several other characters, and another voice over artist; assorted characters . Des mangan had originally written the Screen play for he and Patience. But after being auditioned by parker, It was recast with actors.

== Other screen appearances ==
Sally Patience has appeared in a number of other screen roles including as a backing singer in the Australian film Billy's Holiday and in the television drama Dog's Head Bay as Dimity Todd.

== Current work ==
Sally Patience has since become one of Australia's best known voice-over artists and she regularly works on major national and local advertising campaigns.

== See also ==
- Hercules Returns
- Voice-over
