= Amy (1997 film) =

- Poster
- Directed by: Nadia Tass
- Written by: David Parker
- Produced by: Nadia Tass; David Parker
- Starring: Alana De Roma; Rachel Griffiths; Ben Mendelsohn; Nick Barker
- Cinematography: David Parker
- Edited by: Bill Murphy
- Music by: Philip Judd
- Production companies: Cascade Films; Film Victoria
- Distributed by: Roadshow Home Video; Village Roadshow; World Wide Motion Pictures Corp.
- Release dates: 12 September 1997 (Athens); 27 August 1998
- Running time: 104 minutes
- Country: Australia
- Language: English
- Box office: A$599,724 (Australia)

Amy is a 1997 Australian film written by David Parker and directed by Nadia Tass, starring Alana De Roma in the title role, Rachel Griffiths, Ben Mendelsohn, and Nick Barker.

== Plot ==
Amy's (Alana De Roma) father, Will Enker (Nick Barker), was a popular rock musician accidentally electrocuted while performing on stage. The psychological trauma leaves Amy selectivley mute. At the age of eight she is brought by her mother, Tanya (Rachel Griffiths), to Melbourne to diagnose the reasons for her continued silence. Amy befriends her neighbor, Robert (Ben Mendelsohn), and while social workers try desperately to get her to speak and go to school, she makes the choice to communicate again and begins to sing along to Robert's rock songs after three years of silence. Her mother works out her own emotional issues with the help of a therapist.

== Cast ==
- Alana De Roma as Amy Enker
- Rachel Griffiths as Tanya Rammus
- Ben Mendelsohn as Robert Buchanan
- Nick Barker as Will Enker
- Susie Porter as Anny Buchanan
- Kerry Armstrong as Sarah Trendle
- Jeremy Trigatti as Zac Trendle
- William Zappa as Bill Trendle
- Torquil Neilson as Luke Lassiter
- Sullivan Stapleton as Wayne Lassiter
- Elena Maya as Flamenco Dancer
- Fernando Mira as Spanish Dancer/Waiter
- Mary Ward as Mrs. Mullins
- Jeremy Kewley as Maurice Reitman
- Charles 'Bud' Tingwell as Country Doctor
- Grant Piro as PC Franklin
- Bobby Bright as Busker
- Sarah Carter as Carousel Receptionist
- Janet Andrewartha as Singing Receptionist
- David Mason as Paparazzi
- Steve Brown as Leon
- Kim Gyngell as Wax Stevens
- Frank Gallacher as Dr. Urquhart
- Malcolm Kennard as Brian Cosgrove
- Jan Friedl as Susan Hammett
- Osvaldo Maione as Franco Rammus
- Dino Marnika as Mike Cialino
- Marco Chiappi as Greg Barton
- Robert Meldrum as Brad Duffy
- Adriano Cortese as Manny Cortex
- Victoria Eagger as Jeanette Chandler
- Martin Copping as Groupie

== Production ==
The story developed from a concept inspired by the Man of La Mancha and the screenplay was developed by Tass' husband David Parker. The project that took eleven years to complete due to financial problems and a difficult search for the perfect "Amy". At one stage, the role of Robert was offered to Michael Jackson but he turned it down.

== Release ==
The film first screened at the Athens International Film Festival on 12 September 1997, and had its Australian premiere 27 August 1998. It was screened at multiple film festivals from 1998 through 2003, before its television debut in Italy on 14 October 2004.

== Reception ==
When it was released, Amy received rave reviews and many awards and nominations. The film also received criticism as it was sometimes felt to be dated and imprecise in its references to Amy's plight. In France and the U.S., the film was a hit, apparently receiving standing ovations at some theatres.

The film received approval from Lawrence van Gelder of The New York Times when he offered that "A couple of good performances, linked to a crowd-pleasing but predictable story marred by some slapdash construction await audiences..." and "Warm of heart, modest in polish, 'Amy' provides satisfactions that must be balanced against its flaws."

The Seattle Post-Intelligencer was less forgiving when they opined that "although the film is a decidedly mixed bag, it's blessed by solid performances from a top-notch cast", that it "feels dated and imprecise", and is "not able to make up its mind whether it wants to be slapstick or a heart-wrenching drama."

On Rotten Tomatoes, the film has an approval rating of 43%, based on reviews from 14 critics. On Metacritic, the film has a score of 40 out of 100, based on reviews from 8 critics, indicating "mixed or average reviews".

=== Box office ===
Amy took $599,724 at the box office in Australia.

== Awards and nominations ==
The film won the Prix de la Jeunesse at the 1999 Cannes International Film Festival, and also won the Le Prix Cinecole, an award judged by teachers from across France, which award was presented by the French Minister for Education and Culture. It was announced that Amy would be included in the senior high school curriculum in France.

- 1998, Asia-Pacific Film Festival
  - Grand Jury Award for outstanding contribution to humanity, Nadia Tass
- People's Choice Awards
  - Favourite Australian Movie
- 1998, Heartland Film Festival
  - Crystal Heart Award, Nadia Tass & David Parker
- 1998, Australian Film Institute
  - AFI Award nomination for Best Original Screenplay, David Parker
- 1998, Brisbane International Film Festival
  - Most Popular Film audience selection
- 1998, Australian Cinematographers Society
  - Gold (shared) for Feature Productions Section, David Parker
- 1998, Australian Film Institute
  - AFI Award nomination for Best Performance by an Actress in a Leading Role, Rachel Griffiths
- 1999, Cannes International Film Festival
  - Prix de la Jeunesse, Nadia Tass
  - Le Prix Cinecole, Nadia Tass
- 1999, Creteil Festival de Femmes
  - Prix de Jeunesse
  - Prix du Jury Graine de Cinephage
- 1999, Giffoni Film Festival
  - Bronze Gryphon for Best Actress, Alana De Roma
  - Golden Gryphon, Nadia Tass
- 1999, Oulu International Children's Film Festival nomination for Starboy Award, Nadia Tass
- Laon International Film Festival For Young People
  - Best Film
  - Prix du Jury International Jeune Public
- 1999, Australian Cinematographers Society
  - Award of Distinction for Feature Productions Cinema, David Parker
  - Nominated for Featured Productions Cinema
- 1999, Young Artist Awards
  - nomination for Young Artist Award for Best Performance in a Feature Film - Young Actress Age Ten or Under, Alana De Roma
- 2000, Carrousel international du film de Rimouski
  - Audience Camério, Nadia Tass
  - Camerio Best Feature
  - Camerio Grand Public
  - Camerio Best Actress, Alana de Roma
  - Camerio Best Actor, Ben Mendelsohn
- 2000, Paris Film Festival
  - Public Prize, Nadia Tass

== Reviews ==
- Variety: Amy review by David Rooney
- eFilmCritic: Amy (2001) review by Jimmie Reardon
- Haro-Online: Amy review
- Steve Baker's Film Review: review

== See also ==
- Cinema of Australia
