= The Sound of Trees =

Studio album by Schnell Fenster
- Released: October 1988
- Studio: Platinum Studios, Melbourne
- Genre: Rock
- Length: 44.12
- Label: Atlantic
- Producer: Schnell Fenster; Clive Langer, Alan Winstanley on "Love-Hate Relationship", "That's Impossible" and "This Illusion"

Schnell Fenster chronology
| The Sound of Trees (1988) | Ok Alright a Huh Oh Yeah (1991) |

Professional ratings
Review scores
| Source | Rating |
|---|---|
| AllMusic | 4/5 stars |

The Sound of Trees is the first album by Schnell Fenster, released in 1988.

== Track listing ==
All lyrics by Philip Judd; all music by Schnell Fenster

1. "Whisper"
2. "Love-Hate Relationship"
3. "Sleeping Mountain"
4. "That's Impossible"
5. "This Illusion"
6. "Lamplight"
7. "The Sound of Trees"
8. "White Flag"
9. "Long Way Down"
10. "Skin the Cat"
11. "Run-a-Mile"
12. "Never Stop"

== Personnel ==
Schnell Fenster

- Philip Judd - guitar, keyboards, vocals; trumpet on "Lamplight" and "Never Stop"
- Nigel Griggs - bass guitar
- Noel Crombie - drums, percussion
- Michael den Elzen - guitars, guitar synthesizer, keyboards
- Schnell Fenster - backing vocals

with:

- The Brasstards - brass on "Love-Hate Relationship" and "This Illusion"

Technical

- Alan Winstanley, Chris Corr, Clive Martin, Ian McKenzie, Paul Kosky - engineer

== Charts ==
| Chart (1988) | Peak position |
|---|---|
| Australian Albums (ARIA Charts) | 82 |
