= Tim White (New Zealand producer) =

New Zealand film producer

Timothy White, usually credited as Tim White, is a New Zealand-born film producer who has produced and executive produced many films in both Australia and New Zealand. He produced his first film in the late 1970s, while still at film school, and later became known in Australia for his collaborations with husband-and-wife filmmakers Nadia Tass and David Parker, beginning with Malcolm in 1986. He went on to produce and executive produce many Australian, New Zealand, and international productions, mostly theatrically-released feature films but also telemovies and TV series. Recent work includes The Furnace (2020) and Gracie Otto's the musical comedy Seriously Red (2022).

== Early life and education ==
Timothy White was born in the town of Fairlie on the South Island of New Zealand.

He graduated from the Ilam School of Fine Arts at the University of Canterbury in Christchurch, New Zealand. It was there that he met Vincent Ward.

While still at Ilam, New Zealand author Janet Frame agreed to let Ward and White (as director/producer team) to adapt one of her novels. This became A State of Siege. The screenplay of the 52-minute film was written by Frame herself, co-written by White. The story is described as that of "a retired art teacher dealing with isolation and loneliness, culminating in a stormy, terrifying night". The film was released in 1978. White later took a print of the film to Europe and managed to sell it to a number of distributors.

He then won a producing fellowship to train at 20th Century Fox in Hollywood.

== Career ==
=== Producer ===
==== Film ====
In 1982 White co-produced (with Robert Le Tet) the psychological horror film Next of Kin, shot in Australia, while working in a commercial production company run by advertising director Tony Williams. White returned to New Zealand to be first assistant director on Ward's debut feature film Vigil (1984).

This was followed by Strikebound, a drama based on the 1937 Korumburra miners' strike in Victoria. The film, released in 1984, was co-produced with Miranda Bain, directed by Richard Lowenstein, and edited by Jill Bilcock. It was nominated for many AFI Awards, including Best Film, and winning Best Achievement in Production Design.

White collaborated with the husband-and-wife filmmakers Nadia Tass and David Parker, on their first and perhaps best known film, the award-winning 1986 comedy Malcolm, as well as Rikky and Pete (1988), and The Big Steal (1990), which were both very successful too.

Other film credits as producer include Celia (1989); Death in Brunswick (1990; written by NZ satirist John Clarke), starring Sam Neill; Spotswood (1991), starring Anthony Hopkins and Russell Crowe; and Eight Ball (1992). For Map of the Human Heart (1992), directed by his friend and collaborator Vincent Ward, White worked with a multinational cast and crew, filming in locations around Europe and in the Arctic. He also co-produced Angel Baby (1995); New Zealand romance film Broken English (1996); Cosi (1996), starring Toni Collette and Rachel Griffiths; and Oscar and Lucinda (1997), directed by Gillian Armstrong and starring Ralph Fiennes and Cate Blanchett.

In late 1996, White became founding head of a co-production venture between Fox and Mel Gibson, called Fox-Icon, based at Fox Studios Australia in Sydney. The company failed to produce a single film, shutting down in December 1999, but during this time White personally executive produced two films (Strange Fits of Passion and Two Hands). Gibson was the founder-owner of Icon Productions (est. 1989).

He co-produced the 2003 comedy crime thriller film Gettin' Square, starring Sam Worthington and David Wenham. In 2005 he co-produced New Zealand/Fijian director Toa Fraser's film No. 2, which won the World Cinema Audience Prize at Sundance. He followed this with another New Zealand film, directed by Robert Sarkies – Out of the Blue (2006), as co-producer with Steven O'Meagher.

In 2009 White co-produced Australian director Scott Hicks' 2009 film The Boys Are Back, starring Clive Owen, and then executive produced (Note: According to IMDb.) the 2010 New Zealand-South Korean fantasy action film The Warrior's Way (shot in New Zealand), starring Kate Bosworth, Danny Huston, and Geoffrey Rush. In 2012 he again teamed up with Sarkies to produce the NZ drama film Two Little Boys.

He produced Australian director Julius Avery's debut feature film, Son of a Gun (2014), starring Ewan McGregor and Alicia Vikander; and the sci fi thriller, I Am Mother (2019), starring Hilary Swank and Rose Byrne.

White co-produced the 2020 drama The Furnace (2020), set in outback Western Australia in 1897 and starring David Wenham, with Tenille Kennedy. In 2022 he co-produced the musical comedy film Seriously Red, directed by Gracie Otto and featuring many of the hits of Dolly Parton.

==== TV series ====
In 1992 he co-produced, with David Parker and Michael Wearing, the three-part multinational TV drama series Stark, written by Ben Elton and directed by Nadia Tass.

=== Executive producer ===
==== Film ====
White has also executive produced several films, including two Australian films released in 1999: Strange Fits of Passion (1999) and Gregor Jordan's Two Hands, starring Heath Ledger and Bryan Brown, under his own name. After being appointed head of the Australian branch of British production company Working Title Films, White executive produced another of Jordan's films, the 2003 Ned Kelly, starring Heath Ledger, Geoffrey Rush, Orlando Bloom, and Naomi Watts.

He also executive produced Julia Leigh's 2001 erotic drama Sleeping Beauty; executive producer on the 2011 film Mr. Pip, starring Hugh Laurie, which premiered in New Zealand in October 2013.

White served as an executive producer on NZ director James Napier Robertson's debut feature The Dark Horse (2014); and on Robert Sarkies drama telemovie based on a true story, Consent: The Louise Nicholas Story, which won a New Zealand Film Award.

==== TV series ====
On television, he executive produced (along with Steven O'Meagher and others) the 2010 New Zealand TV drama series This Is Not My Life. Directed by Sarkies and Peter Salmon, it won Best Drama Programme in the 2011 Aotearoa Film and Television Awards.

In 2020 he executive produced the drama television miniseries written by Eleanor Catton, The Luminaries (based on her 2013 novel of the same name, and commissioned by BBC Television).

== Awards and nominations ==
- 1986: Winner, AFI Award for Best Film for Malcolm
- 1995: Winner, AFI Award for Best Film, for Angel Baby
- 1999: Winner, AFI Award for Best Film, for Two Hands
- 2008: Winner, Best Film, in the New Zealand Film Awards, for Out of the Blue
