= Sheryl Munks =

Australian actress

- Born: 1965 (age 60–61)
- Occupation: Actress
- Years active: 1986–2001
- Known for: Prisoner (1986); Acropolis Now (1989–1992); The Big Steal (1990); The Man from Snowy River (1994–1996)

Sheryl Munks (born 1965) is an Australian actress, known for her role in television serials.

== Career ==
Munks is known for her role as inmate Michelle 'Brumby' Tucker in the prison soap opera Prisoner in 1986. She had a recurring role as Sophie in comedy series Acropolis Now from 1989 to 1992. She then played a main role in the adventure drama series The Man from Snowy River as Emily McGregor from 1994 to 1996.

She also had guest roles in several series, including The Flying Doctors, Blue Heelers, Neighbours, A Country Practice and Stingers.

She played Pam Schaeffer in 1990 feature film The Big Steal alongside Ben Mendelsohn and Claudia Karvan.

Munks is also a voiceover artist, who has voiced many television and radio commercials for well-known clients such as Beacon Lighting, Sportsgirl, Lexus and Melbourne Food and Wine Festival.

Additionally, she is a wedding celebrant, and is a former dancer of classical ballet, jazz ballet and tap, as well as a dance instructor.

== Personal life ==
Munks is married with two sons. She was married at Montsalvat in Eltham, outside of Melbourne.

== Filmography ==
=== Television ===
Year	Title	Role	Notes
1986	Prisoner	Michelle 'Brumby' Tucker (recurring role)	TV series
1987	In Between	Angie	TV miniseries, 4 episodes
1987	Neighbours	Chrissie Adams (guest role)	TV series, 5 episodes
1988	A Country Practice	Annie Smart	TV series, 2 episodes: "Sparring Partners: Parts 1 & 2"
1988; 1990	The Flying Doctors	Roxanne / Sue	TV series, 2 episodes: "Roxanne", "Small Mercies"
1990	Skirts	Mrs Williams	TV series, 1 episode
1989–1992	Acropolis Now	Sophie (recurring role)	TV series, 9 episodes
1994	Janus	Simone	TV series, episode: "Without Prejudice"
1994–1996	The Man from Snowy River	Emily McGregor (main role)	TV series, 63 episodes
1994; 1999	Blue Heelers	Tracey Danites / Carol Wickham	TV series, 2 episodes: "The Final Season", "Perfect Match"
1997	The Balanced Particle Freeway	Esmeralda the Cat	TV film
1998	State Coroner	Heather O'Connor	TV series, episode: "Sunday in the Country"
1999	Stingers	Leanne Kanter	TV series, episode: "The Long Haul"
2021	Talking Prisoner	Self	Podcast series, 1 episode

=== Film ===
Year	Title	Role	Notes
1990	In Too Deep	Girl on street	
1990	The Big Steal	Pam Schaeffer	Feature film
1991	Holidays on the River Yarra	Valerie	Feature film
1993	Hercules Returns	Voice	Feature film
2001	Mallboy	Pam	Feature film
