= The Makers (Australian band) =

Australian band

- Origin: Melbourne, Victoria, Australia
- Genres: Rock pop
- Years active: 1988–1992
- Labels: Mana/WEA, Warner
- Past members: Brian Baker; Eddie Rayner; Michael Barker

The Makers were an Australian band formed by ex-Split Enz keyboardist, Eddie Rayner, and musician and singer, Brian Baker. The duo formed in 1988 after recording the tracks for a feature film, Rikky and Pete. The self-titled debut album The Makers released in 1990, provided three singles. The second album, Hokey Pokey, was released in 1992 with two further singles. They toured Australia in 1991 supporting the B-52's.

== History ==
The Makers were formed in 1988 in Melbourne by Brian Baker (ex-the Ones) on lead vocals, lead guitar and programming; and Eddie Rayner (ex-the Wanx, Split Enz) on keyboards, keyboard bass, synthesisers and programming. Baker and Rayner had met in 1985 when the latter produced the Ones' debut single, "Heart" (1986). Rayner then worked in England on Paul McCartney's album, Press to Play (August 1986), before connecting with fellow Split Enz alumni, Noel Crombie, Nigel Griggs and Phil Judd in the Wanx (which were renamed Schnell Fenster) in 1987. Rayner left before they recorded their first album.

Upon return to Australia Rayner collaborated with Baker to co-write the musical score for a feature film, Rikky and Pete (1988), directed by Nadia Tass. Crombie and Judd, using fellow Schnell Fenster members, formed Noel's Cowards which contributed to the film's soundtrack. The Makers released their debut self-titled album in July 1990 on the Mana record label and distributed by WEA. In the studio Baker and Rayner co-produced the album with hired session musicians and Hugh Padgham as mixer. The Makers provided four singles, "Big Picture" (April 1990), "New Kind of Blue" (August 1990)and "Daylight" (October 1990) and "Simple Things" (March 1991).

In the following year the group were joined by Michael Barker on drums and toured Australia in support of the United States band, the B-52's. The Makers second studio album, Hokey Pokey, was released in June 1993 by Warner Music Australasia. It provided two singles, "From Now On" (March 1992) and "Perfect Crime" (June 1993). The group disbanded soon after as both Baker and Rayner pursued solo careers. Baker's second solo album, Prague Radio (2004) included two tracks co-written with Rayner, "It's All Love" and "Head in the Clouds".

== Discography ==
=== Studio albums ===
Title	Details	Peak chart positions
Title	Details	AUS
The Makers	Released: July 1990; Format: CD; Label: Mana Music (170962–1)	104
Hokey Pokey	Released: June 1993; Format: CD; Label: Mana Music (450990792–2)	—

=== Singles ===
List of singles, with selected chart positions
Year	Title	Peak chart positions	Album
Year	Title	AUS	Album
1990	"Big Picture"	82	The Makers
1990	"New Kind of Blue"	131	The Makers
1990	"Daylight"	—	The Makers
1991	"Simple Thing"	—	The Makers
1992	"From Now On"	—	Hokey Pokey
1993	"Perfect Crime"	—	Hokey Pokey
