= Michael den Elzen =

Australian musician (born 1962)

Michael den Elzen (born 1962) is a musician and music producer based in Melbourne, Australia. He has performed for over 30 years with many well-known Australian and New Zealand artists, principally as a guitarist, and has contributed music for several Australian movie soundtracks.

== Early career ==
Den Elzen spent his early life in Boort and Mansfield (Victoria) and started playing guitar at about 10 years of age. At the age of 15, he was performing in Melbourne with the band Expresso Bongo, who made it to the finals of the Channel 9 TV talent competition "Safeway New Faces". He co-founded local bands Notorious Gentlemen and The U-Boats, and did recording studio session work. At age 19, he joined Broderick Smith for his first solo album and toured in his band for about three years. He went on to perform with Venetta Fields; with Tim Finn as a guitarist on his 1985 Big Canoe tour; and with Stephen Cummings on his "This Wonderful Life" album, and Australian and US tours.

In the mid 80s, den Elzen formed Melbourne band Schnell Fenster with ex-Split Enz members Phil Judd, Nigel Griggs and Noel Crombie. They released two albums, "The Sound of Trees" and "OK Alright A Huh Oh Yeah" and toured in Australia and New Zealand.

== 1990s ==
After the breakup of Schnell Fenster, den Elzen played on and co-produced Deborah Conway's 1991 successful String of Pearls album. He went to America to perform for Peter Case on Six-Pack of Love. The band on the album includes producer and keyboardist Mitchell Froom, bassist Bruce Thomas (Elvis Costello and The Attractions) and drummer Gary Mallaber (Van Morrison, Steve Miller Band).

He recorded and toured as bass player and musical director with Tim Finn on Finn's 1993 album Before and After; and toured and recorded with Richard Pleasance; and then toured and recorded with Melbourne band Rebecca's Empire for their Way of All Things album.

At the end of the 1990s, he joined Australian rock outfit Deadstar co-producing their final album Somewhere Over The Radio.

== Soundtracks ==
Den Elzen started composing music for films in the 80s, the first being As The Mirror Burns (1990 release date). He worked with Phil Judd and Schnell Fenster on the soundtrack for the movie Rikky and Pete (1988), and was also involved with Phil Judd on the soundtrack for The Big Steal (1990) and Mr. Reliable (1996). Three Schnell Fenster songs feature in the Jane Campion film Sweetie (1989).

He did the soundtrack to David Batty's Rodeo Road (1999) which led to producing, recording, and co-writing the music for the TV series Bush Mechanics (2001) in Yuendumu about 300 km north-west of Alice Springs, and the soundtracks to other David Batty films, Sisters, Pearls and Mission Girls (2003) and Taylor Made (2003), as well as the TV series Inventions From The Shed (2005), all aired on the ABC.

Den Elzen also worked on a project with painter and artist David Munro called Birdbrain, whose music was used in the TV series The Secret Life of Us and in the film Ghosts of the Civil Dead (1988). Other composer credits include Trespass (2001), Beyond Sorry (2004), Bush Bikes (2003), Us Mob (2005) and Aurukun-Voices From The Cape (2008) by David Vadiveloo, Case 442 (2005) by C.A.A.M.A., Going Bush (2006) by SBS TV, Marree Man (2007), the series Halal Mate (2007) (for which he was nominated in the category of "Best Music for a Documentary" at the 2008 APRA-AGSC Screen Music Awards), That's Australia (2007), Desert Heart (2007), Wedding Makers (2008), Coniston (2012), Kabelbel (2013), Black As series 1-4 (2016-2022) and Truck Hunters (2018-2020) (Ten Network) by Rebel Films, Artists at Work – David Frazer (2007), IOU – Lloyd Rees (2007) and Tom Moore – Glassorama (2008) by Tony Wyzenbeek at ABC TV, the SBS series Love's Harvest (2007) by Brian McKenzie and Rebel Films, and God Is A Wandjina (2021) by Paul Bell (Feral Films) for Compass (ABC TV). Michael also collaborated with Justin Marshall on the soundtrack for the second series of The Art Life (2008) by Frank Haines Films, which aired on ABC TV.

== Other work ==
He produced, recorded and played most instruments on Take Me to the Place by Tess McKenna after collaborating on a song for the film soundtrack to Curtains for My Cabin and played guitars on March also by Tess McKenna – year uncertain since dates are not given on the album, and on her 2019 release Before You Wandered In . He played guitar and recorded with David Bridie and has also written and performed with Renée Geyer, Mark Seymour and Pound System. Other artists Michael has recorded with include Zulya Kamalova (he is also accredited with mixing her album Tales of Subliming), Margaret Urlich, Diana Aniad, Bollywood Prog Metal band; BaK and Mimori Yusa (Japan). Michael also mixed tracks for Kim Salmon & The Surrealists including I Won't Tell from the album Ya Gotta Let Me Do My Thing, and has a musical credit on the film The Man Who Sued God.

Den Elzen has visited far north-western South Australia (Anangu Pitjantjatjara Yankunytjatjara / APY Lands) over the years to record songs by local musicians promoting awareness of issues to do with health and well-being, supported by Nganampa Health Council in Alice Springs. The resulting CDs are called UPK2 Tilun Tilun Ta (2003), UPK3 Kunma Piti-la (2004), UPK4 Ulkiyala (2005) and UPK5 Katji Kuta-la (2011).

In 2017 he released the album Music For Listening And Relaxation with former band-mate Rebecca Barnard. An eclectic soundscape featuring Rebecca's haunting vocals, Michael produced and co-wrote the songs, and played all the instruments apart from some acoustic guitar by Barnard. Michael continues to work on film sound production. He is accredited with audio-post production and music composition on the SBS series Halal Mate, Kabelbel, Maree Man, Black As, Truck Hunters and audio-post production for Little J and Big Cuz. He is currently composing for another project.
