= Death in Brunswick =

- DVD cover
- Directed by: John Ruane
- Written by: Boyd Oxlade, John Ruane
- Produced by: Timothy White
- Starring: Sam Neill; Zoe Carides; John Clarke
- Cinematography: Ellery Ryan
- Edited by: Neil Thumpston
- Music by: Phil Judd; Peter Volaris
- Distributed by: Roadshow Entertainment (Australia)
- Release dates: 8 November 1990 (London Film Festival); 25 April 1991 (Australia)
- Running time: 109 minutes (or 100 min)
- Country: Australia
- Languages: English; Turkish; Greek
- Budget: $2.2 million
- Box office: $2,725,169 (Australia)

Death in Brunswick is a 1990 Australian black comedy/romance starring Sam Neill, Zoe Carides, and John Clarke. It is based on the 1987 comic novel of the same name by Boyd Oxlade. At the APRA Music Awards of 1991, "Death in Brunswick" won Film Score of the Year.

== Plot ==
Set and filmed in Brunswick, a Melbourne suburb, it deals with a humble chef, Carl, who gets a job at a sleazy nightclub owned by Yanni Voulgaris. He begins a relationship with Greek-Australian barmaid Sophie (Zoe Carides), which soon brings him into trouble with his employers and her strict father. His drug-dealing Turkish-Australian co-worker, Mustafa, is beaten up by the bouncer Laurie. Thinking Carl informed on him, Mustafa attacks Carl who accidentally stabs and kills him.

Carl calls his friend, Dave, a grave digger, and they bury Mustafa. This leads to one of the most famous scenes in the film—Dave's idea that they bury the body in the opened grave of a woman whose husband will be buried above her the following day. Dave expects the coffin of the deceased to be comparatively empty, given how long it has been since she died. When he finds that the rate of decomposition is not what he expects, he begins to stomp and crush her body to make some room.

Mustafa's wife and son later come to the restaurant and ask Carl if they know what happened to Mustafa. Carl denies any knowledge and is wracked with guilt. Carl gives his pay to Mustafa's wife, even though Dave tells him that it might make him suspect.

Sophie tells Carl she is engaged to marry Yanni, and does not want to see him anymore. He tries to see her at the nightclub, but she leaves with her father. Moments later the Turks firebomb the nightclub, but Laurie sees Carl leaving and blames him.

Later Mustafa's son sees him at a pool with Sophie. Knowing that Sophie is also having a relationship with one of the Greek owners, Mustafa's Turkish friends confront Carl. Believing Laurie to be responsible for Mustafa's disappearance, they get their revenge and behead him.

Carl leaves his job and is later comforted in church when he imagines seeing Mustafa, who offers him a friendly handshake. After his domineering mother suffers a stroke and is left a quadriplegic, Carl marries Sophie, despite her father's protests and the final scene from their wedding is reminiscent of the Last Supper.

== Cast ==
- Zoe Carides as Sophie Papafagos
- John Clarke as Dave
- Yvonne Lawley as Mrs Fitzgerald
- Sam Neill as Carl Fitzgerald
- Nicholas Papademetriou as Yanni Voulgaris
- Deborah Kennedy as June
- Doris Younane as Carmel
- Boris Brkic as Laurie
- Daniel Pollock

== Production ==
The film was produced by New Zealand producer Timothy White, and the original music score was composed and produced by New Zealand-born musician Phil Judd. Neil Thumpston edited the film.

It was shot from 15 January to 5 March 1990, with Ellery Ryan as cinematographer.

== Reception ==
David Stratton and Margaret Pomeranz, film critics for The Movie Show, awarded the film four-and-a-half stars out of five. Stratton described the film as "a black comedy which isn't afraid to take risks, to shift moods, to push to the limit".

Sydney Morning Herald film critic Rob Lowing praised the performances of Sam Neill, Zoe Carides, and John Clarke. Lowing described the film as "a gem of a black comedy and certainly the best that Australia has produced in years".

== Box office ==
Death in Brunswick grossed $2,725,169 at the box office in Australia, which is equivalent to $5,490,566 in 2021 dollars. It was the second highest-grossing Australian film of the year behind Green Card.

== Awards ==
At the APRA Music Awards of 1991, the score for Death in Brunswick, written by Phil Judd, won Film Score of the Year.

== See also ==
- Cinema of Australia
