= David Parker (director) =

Australian filmmaker

- Born: 1947 (age 77–78)
- Occupations: Cinematographer; film producer; screenwriter; film director
- Years active: 1983–present
- Organization: Cascade Films
- Known for: Filmmaking with Nadia Tass
- Notable work: Malcolm (1986); The Big Steal (1990)
- Spouse: Nadia Tass

David Parker (born 1947), commonly known as Parker is an Australian cinematographer, film producer, screenwriter, and film director. He has made many films with his wife Nadia Tass through their company Cascade Films, including Malcolm (1986), Rikky and Pete (1988), The Big Steal (1990), Amy (1997), and The Menkoff Method (2016).

== Early life and education ==
David Parker was born in 1947 in Brisbane, Queensland. His father, who was a teacher, actor, and musician, played the organ in Brisbane cinemas on weekends, accompanied by David. As he played before and after the B film, Parker never got to see the main features. His father was a founding member of a theatre company in Brisbane called Twelfth Night Theatre. His mother was a nursing sister who worked during World War II, and lived through the fall of Singapore in 1942.

As a child, Parker enjoyed mechanical things – designing and building things – as well as photography. He started a degree in mechanical engineering at Queensland University, but when he found that it was not just about building gadgets, took up a mining job in Mount Isa just to make some money. There he met a man from Melbourne who was going to the photography school in Melbourne, and Parker applied for and was accepted at the school. He did a three-year course there, but could not get work immediately afterwards, so stayed in Melbourne, initially renting a studio and doing wedding and portrait photography.

He is commonly known simply as "Parker".

== Career ==
=== Film ===
One of Parker's clients at his first photography studio was the national magazine TV Times, for which he became the Melbourne photographer, and this became his pathway into the entertainment industry. He worked on TV series such as Homicide and then, his first role as stills photographer on a film, on Raw Deal, a 1977 Australian Western. He was stills photographer on films for around 10 years, as well as other photography, including rock 'n' roll, theatre, and ballet. During the 1970s he shot stills of many local and international musicians, including the Beatles, ABBA, AC/DC, Skyhooks, and (his favourites) Mondo Rock.

He was first asked to be cinematographer on a short film by Tony Mahood, who was assistant director. In 1984, Parker was stills photographer on the film The Coolangatta Gold, when actor Colin Friels encouraged him to try his hand at writing for film.

Parker's first major film was Malcolm (1986), which he shot, co-wrote, and produced. He says he was inspired by Charlie Chaplin's films, with a lot of physical comedy and "a lot of heart". The film was co-written and directed by Nadia Tass. After discussions with Fox and Warner Bros in the US, Hoyts bought the rights to the film after witnessing the hugely positive audience reception in Australia.

Other films written by Parker were Rikky and Pete, The Big Steal (1990), Amy (1997), and Matching Jack (2010, with Lynne Renew).

Films produced by Parker include The Big Steal, Rikky and Pete, Hotel de Love, Irresistible, 'Amy, Matching Jack, and The Gates of Hell. He also produced Stark – (a BBC mini-series written by Ben Elton) and Fatal Honeymoon (for Lifetime TV in 2013). Parker co-produced the film Kath and Kimderella.

In the 1990s, Parker directed television commercials, notably the "I'd Like To See That" AFL Campaign, and for Vodafone with Michael Richards.

Parker directed Hercules Returns, which was screened at both Venice and Sundance Film Festivals in 1994, and later became a cult hit. He also directed Diana & Me (1997), and The Menkoff Method (2016), in collaboration with Tass. He has said that his directing style is different from Tass; his particular skill is in the storytelling part rather than refining nuances in actors' performances. The Menkoff Method stars Noah Taylor as a Russian workplace expert, who took time off from filming Game of Thrones to participate. Parker described the film as an "anti-bank" satire.

Films shot by Parker include Malcolm, Rikky and Pete, The Big Steal, Pure Luck, Amy, Mr. Reliable, Matching Jack, John Doe, and Kath and Kimderella. Parker's TV cinematography includes The Outsiders (Francis Ford Coppola's offshoot series of the movie); Stark; Felicity, Samantha, The Miracle Worker (2000), Child Star (2001), Custody, Catalina Trust, Lea to the Rescue, and Fatal Honeymoon.

Films produced by Parker include Hotel de Love (1996) for Village Roadshow, and Irresistible (2006) with Susan Sarandon and Emily Blunt.

In 2020, during the COVID-19 pandemic in Australia, he made a short comedy film with Tass, starring the two of them and their son John Tass-Parker, called Isolation Restaurant, which was made available for free on Facebook. He said in an interview that year that he had in the past worked on some very good films but also some "dreadful" ones, "generally very cynical exercises in financing" which were used as tax breaks.

=== Stage ===
Parker wrote the libretto for the 2002 musical theatre production of The Lion, The Witch and The Wardrobe, an adaptation of C.S. Lewis' novel, directed by Tass. The musical earned nominations in the Helpmann Awards for the Best Direction in a Musical as well as Best Presentation for Children awards in April 2003.

He did other theatre work with Tass, including stage lighting, which he particularly enjoys.

== Other roles ==
Parker served as a Commissioner on the Australian Film Commission from 1992 to 1995.

He was a board member of Film Victoria from 2011 to 2019, and sat on its Evaluation Advisory Committee.

== Recognition and awards ==
In 1986, Parker and Tass won the Byron Kennedy Award for their "fiercely independent approach to film making".

Other awards won by Parker include:

- Winner, Gold ACS award for cinematography, for Rikky and Pete
- 1986: Winner, AFI Award for Best Original Screenplay, for Malcolm
- 1986: Co-winner (with Tass), of the AFI Award for Best Film, for Malcolm
- 1998: Winner, AFI Award for Best Original Screenplay, for Amy
- Winner, Cannes Junior award, for Amy
- Winner, Milan International Film Festival awards for both Best Picture and Best Screenplay, for Matching Jack

== Film studios ==
Parker is married to director Nadia Tass, and together they established Cascade Films in 1983, a Melbourne-based production company which has produced many acclaimed feature films and television programs.

Parker and Tass also owned and operated the Melbourne Film Studios in Port Melbourne from 1989 until 2009. Many internationally successful films and TV series were shot in these studios prior to the Docklands Studios Melbourne opening in 2004.
