= Boyd Oxlade =

Australian author and screenwriter

- Born: 8 May 1943; Sydney, New South Wales, Australia
- Died: 24 January 2014 (aged 70)
- Education: Xavier College
- Alma mater: Monash University
- Writing career
- Notable work: Death in Brunswick

Boyd John Michael Oxlade (8 May 1943 – 24 January 2014) was an Australian author and screenwriter, best known for his novel Death in Brunswick, and the adapted screenplay, which he co-wrote.

Oxlade was born in Sydney, and received a Jesuit education in Ireland and at Xavier College in Melbourne, and then studied at Monash University.

He lived in Carlton North and worked as a nightclub cook and a gravedigger at Melbourne General Cemetery (which influenced some of the situations in his novel), then moved to Hobart for six years before returning to Melbourne. After a nine-year period of unemployment, he wrote the novel Death in Brunswick in the hope of making some money. The book was published by William Heinemann Australia in 1987, and the 1991 film adaptation—which Oxlade co-wrote with the film's director, John Ruane, and which starred Sam Neill, Zoe Carides and John Clarke—became a cult hit.

Oxlade died of cancer on 24 January 2014, aged 70. At the time of his death, he was working on a novel Ron Elms, the Flying Butcher of Alamein, a reworking of a screenplay he had written several years earlier.
