= Lindy Davies =

Australian performance and film consultant (born 1946)

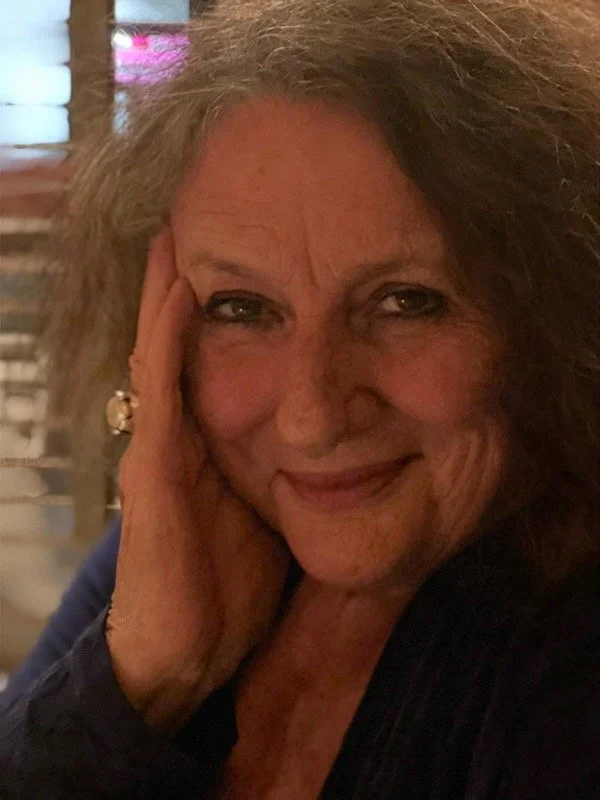
- Davies, 2024
- Born: 29 August 1946 (age 80); Melbourne Victoria, Australia
- Occupations: Performance consultant; film consultant
- Website: lindydavies.com

Lindy Davies (born 29 August 1946) is an Australian actress. She works in various roles in theatre, film and television, and is well known for creating an approach to performance for the intuitive actor. She was the head of drama at the former Victorian College of the Arts for over 11 years until 2007, and worked as a performance consultant on films including Afterglow (1997) and Away From Her (2006) with Julie Christie. In 1985, Davies won the AFI (AACTA) Award for Best Supporting Actress for the 1986 film Malcolm. As an actress, she also played Ruth Ballinger in the Australian soap opera Prisoner

== Career ==
Born in Melbourne, Victoria, Davies has influenced many actors, including Cate Blanchett, Harriet Walter, and Julie Christie. She directed Blanchett in Electra at the National Institute of Dramatic Art in 1992, and worked with Christie as a consultant on the Dennis Potter TV series Karaoke (1996) and the films Hamlet (1996), Afterglow (1997), Away From Her (2006) and Glorious 39 (2009).

Davies, who has said that intuition is the defining principle of her process. has conducted master classes for actors, writers and directors at the Canadian Film Centre from 2010 - 2025 and continues to offer intensives for actors, directors, and writers throughout the world.

=== As director ===
- National Theatre of Slovenia: Scenes From an Execution
- National Theatre of Slovenia: The Changeling
- Moscow Maly Theatre, Old Times.
- Wyndham's Theatre West End, Old Times (with Julie Christie, Leigh Lawson and Harriet Walter).
- Theatr Clwyd, Old Times (with Julie Christie and Leigh Lawson)
- Chichester Festival Theatre, Hedda Gabler (with Harriet Walter, Nicholas Le Prevost and Phyllida Law)
- Chichester Festival Theatre, Suzannah Andler (with [ulie Christie)
- Sydney Theatre Company, Three Days of Rain, A Month in the Country (Opera House), Old Times
- Bell Shakespeare Company:, As You Like It (Opera House);
- Belvoir St Company B, Scenes from an Execution (nominated for a Sydney Theatre Award for Best Director)
- State Theatre Company of South Australia, Room to Move
- Playbox, Fool for Love
- Victorian College of the Arts, The Rover, A Midsummer Night's Dream, Women Beware Women (Middleton/Barker), The Cherry Orchard, Three Sisters, Lysistrata.
- National Institute of Dramatic Art, A Midsummer Night's Dream; Electra; Miss Sarah Sampson.
- Pram Factory: Calling For Help
- La Mama: Calling For Help
- Open Stage: Marat Sade; Ride Across Lake Constance; The Birthday Party

=== Performance consultant ===
Lindy Davies has developed an approach to performance: a process; which is an intuitive imaginative connection to language, space and transformation.

She has worked as a Performance Advisor/Consultant on many films, including:

- Sarah Polley's Away from Her with Julie Christie.
- Davies also worked with Julie Christie on Neverland and Troy.
- Alan Rudolph's Afterglow with Julie Christie.
- Sally Potter's The Tango Lesson.
- Kenneth Branagh's Hamlet with Julie Christie.
- Dennis Potter's Karaoke with Julie Christie.
- Michael Whyte's The Railway Stationman with Julie Christie.
- Pat O'Connor's Fools of Fortune with Julie Christie.
- Australia: includes Looking For Alibrandi, Radiance, The Leaving of Liverpool, Talk, MDA.
- Indivision Lab 2009 AFC Consultant alongside Christine Vachon, Susanne Bier and Claudia Karvan.
- Screen Australia 2011 Flash Black Performance Workshop for Indigenous Directors.

=== Actor training ===
- From November 1995 to January 2007, Lindy Davies was the Head of the School of Drama at the former Victorian College of Arts in Melbourne, Victoria, Australia.
- Davies created an integrated curriculum for the training of Actors, Directors, Writers, Theatre-Makers, Designers and Technical Practitioners at the School of Drama of the former Victorian College of the Arts in Melbourne.
- From 1979 to 1982, she held the position of Head of Acting at the Victorian College of Arts.
- From 1970 to 1978, she was a lecturer in drama at Melbourne State College.

== Actress ==
- Malcolm (AACTA Award for Best Supporting Actress)
- Belvoir St Company B, Scenes from an Execution (Galactea), (nominated for a Critic's Circle Award for Best Actress)
- N.I.D.A. Company, Vassa (Vassa) (nominated for a Critic's Circle Award for Best Actress)
- State Theatre Company of South Australia, The Seagull (Arkadina) Who's Afraid of Virginia Woolf? (Martha), Wild Honey (Anna Petrovna).
- Hunter Valley Theatre Company, Who's Afraid of Virginia Woolf? (Martha), Condor Award for Best Actress.
- New Work: Lyndal Jones: Prediction Piece; Nan Hassall: Biennale Piece; Jenny Kemp: The White Hotel.
- Playbox, Upside Down at the Bottom of the World (Frida), World is Made of Glass (Magda), Buried Child (Haley).
- Rex Cramphorn's Actor's Development Stream, Antony and Cleopatra,(Cleopatra) Britannicus (Agrippina), Hamlet (Gertrude) Not Suitable for Adults (Kate).
- La Mama, Mishka and Nomagava.(Mishka); Thoughts on Meeting A Friend; Halewyn; Tombstone.
- The Pram Factory, Marvellous Melbourne; Marvellous Melbourne II; Chicago Chicago; Don's Party.
- La Mama Experimental Theatre Company: Calm Down Mother; Comings and Goings; Birth of Space; I Don't Know Who to Feel Sorry For; Dimboola, Halewyn.

== Awards ==
- Malcolm (AACTA Award for Best Supporting Actress)
- Sidney Myer Performing Arts Award - A special citation for her contribution to performing arts in Australia.
- Recipient of the Monash University Distinguished Alumni Award for inspirational leadership and significant contribution to the theory and practice of drama.
