= Stark (TV series) =

- Written by: Ben Elton
- Directed by: Nadia Tass
- Starring: Ben Elton; Jacqueline McKenzie; Colin Friels; Deborra-Lee Furness; Derrick O'Connor; Bill Wallis; Bill Hunter
- Theme music composer: Colin Towns
- Countries of origin: United Kingdom; Australia
- Original language: English
- No. of episodes: 3

Production
- Producers: David Parker; Michael Wearing; Timothy White
- Running time: 158 mins

Original release
- Network: ABC TV
- Release: 11 August – 12 August 1993
- Network: BBC2
- Release: 8 December – 22 December 1993

Stark is a 1993 British-Australian television serial, based on the bestselling 1989 novel Stark by comedian Ben Elton. The three-episode series, directed by Nadia Tass, was an international coproduction between the British Broadcasting Corporation and the Australian Broadcasting Corporation. It starred Ben Elton and Jacqueline McKenzie.

== Synopsis ==
The story is a comedic telling of an action adventure, based on Ben Elton's bestselling 1989 novel Stark.

== Cast ==
- Ben Elton as CD (Colin Dobson)
- Jacqueline McKenzie as Rachel O'Donoghue
- Colin Friels as Sly Morgan
- Deborra-Lee Furness as Chrissie
- Derrick O'Connor as Zimmerman
- Bill Wallis as Walter
- Bill Hunter as Ocker Tyron
- John Neville as Lord De Quincey
- Colette Mann as Dixie
- Anne Scott-Pendlebury as Sly's secretary
- David Argue as Gordon Gordon
- Marshall Napier as Private Detective
- Michael Veitch as TV Presenter
- Gus Mercurio as Larry

== Production ==
The budget for the series was A$7 million, with most of the money coming from the BBC. Elton wrote the script adapted from his own novel, as well as taking the starring role as the "whinging Pom", CD.

Nadia Tass directed the series. David Parker, Michael Wearing, and Timothy White were co-producers. Wearing also executive produced, along with Jill Robb. Ken Sallows edited the film. Laurence Eastwood was responsible for production design.

Stark is an Australia/United Kingdom co-production.

Although Stark is primarily set in Western Australia, the series was filmed in two other Australian states: Victoria and South Australia. Desert scenes, which make up much of the later episodes, were filmed in and around Coober Pedy.

== Broadcast ==
Stark was first aired by the ABC in Australia over two nights on 11 and 12 August. The first and second episodes were edited together into one movie-length episode. The third episode aired as the second and final episode in Australia. The series aired in the United Kingdom on BBC2 on Wednesday nights from 8–22 December.

== Differences between the series and the novel ==
The main changes from the plot of the novel were the extent of the Stark Consipiracy's plan, and the ending. In the novel, Rachel escapes from Stark just prior to the launch. The Star Arks land at their moon-base and the conspirators are quickly consumed by their own greed, selfishness and hatred, with Sly eventually committing suicide.

In the series, Lord de Quincy intends to scuttle a fleet of 'leper ships' carrying toxic waste, to actually hasten the extinction of the human species. Sly boards the rocket with Rachel, who has fallen in love with him, and the pair stage a mutiny, and are killed when the Star Arks are shot down by the United States Air Force. In an interview included on the DVD edition, Elton states that this change was suggested by producer Michael Wearing, who was concerned that the novel lacked a "jeopardy point".

Several of the main characters' names are changed in the series: Sly Moorcock was renamed Sly Morgan. Lord Playing is renamed Lord De Quincey.
