= The Balanced Particle Freeway =

- Written by: Carole Wilkinson
- Directed by: Paul Moloney
- Starring: Damien Bodie; Trudy Hellier; Peter Hosking; Sheryl Munks; Anne Phelan; John Flaus
- Music by: Garry McDonald; Laurie Stone
- Country of origin: Australia
- Original language: English

Production
- Producers: Zelda Rosenbaum; Oscar Whitbread
- Cinematography: Zenon Sawko
- Editor: Ray Daley
- Running time: 92 minutes

Original release
- Release: 1997

The Balanced Particle Freeway is a 1997 Australian TV movie starring Damien Bodie.

== Cast ==
- Molly McCaffrey as Lili
- Damien Bodie as Bede
- Trudy Hellier as Helen
- Doug Bowles as Drew
- Peter Hosking as Mizuchi / Spud
- Sheryl Munks as Esmerelda the Cat
- Anne Phelan as Highest Tree
- John Flaus as Zeppa

== Synopsis ==
Two children Lili and Bede discover (with the help of Mizuchi, a magical dragon), a Balanced Particle Freeway which sends them on some escapades around the world.
