= Sorting Out Rachel =

Australian comedy play

- Original language: English
- Written by: David Williamson
- Genre: comedy

Premiere
- Date: 2018
- Place: Ensemble Theatre, Sydney

Sorting Out Rachel is an Australian comedy play by David Williamson. It premiered in 2018 directed by Nadia Tass. Tass said the play is "a debate about our responsibility to indigenous communities. And it's set against a family backdrop where the characters are complex and where each of the characters fear losing their entitlement."

== Plot ==
A wealthy man has to break the news to his family that he has a secret daughter, much to his discomfort.
