= Fernando Mira =

Honduran footballer and manager

Personal information
- Full name: Fernando Manuel Mendes Mira
- Date of birth: 20 April 1962 (age 64)
- Place of birth: Cartaxo, Portugal
- Height: 1.72 m (5 ft 8 in)
- Position: Defender

Senior career*
Years	Team	Apps	(Gls)
1980–1981	Ouriquense		
1981–1982	Cartaxo		
1982–1984	União de Santarém		
1984–1985	Estarreja	3	(0)
1985–1988	Cartaxo		
1988–1991	União de Almeirim		
1991–1992	Torres Novas	30	(1)
1992–1994	Sporting de Pombal		

Managerial career
- 1996–2002: Naval (assistant)
- 2002: Naval
- 2002–2004: Naval (assistant)
- 2004: Naval
- 2004: Naval (interim)
- 2006: Naval (assistant)
- 2006–2007: Naval
- 2007: Naval (interim)
- 2007–2009: Naval (assistant)
- 2009: Naval (interim)
- 2009–2010: Naval (assistant)
- 2010–2011: Naval (interim)
- 2011–2015: Naval (assistant)
- 2015–2016: Naval
- 2017: Trofense
- 2021–: Vida
- * Club domestic league appearances and goals

Fernando Manuel Mendes Mira (born 20 April 1962) is a Portuguese former footballer and football manager.
