= Schnell Fenster =

New Zealand rock band

- Also known as: The Wanx, Noel's Cowards
- Origin: Melbourne, Victoria, Australia
- Genres: Pop/rock
- Years active: 1986–1992
- Labels: EMI; WEA; Atlantic
- Spinoff of: Split Enz
- Past members: Noel Crombie; Michael den Elzen; Nigel Griggs; Phil Judd; Eddie Rayner

Schnell Fenster were a New Zealand rock band formed in Melbourne, Australia in 1986 by Noel Crombie on drums and percussion, Nigel Griggs on bass guitar and backing vocals, Phil Judd on lead vocals and guitar, and Eddie Rayner on keyboards and piano – who were all former members of New Zealand-formed rock group, Split Enz. Fellow founder, Michael den Elzen on lead guitar had worked with Tim Finn Band, another band formed by a Split Enz alumnus. Judd's band were briefly named The Wanx: but Rayner soon left and they changed their name to faux-German for "quick window", because it "appealed to [their] perversity". The group formed the core members of Noel's Cowards, a short-term ensemble, whose sole output was six tracks for the soundtrack of a feature film, Rikky and Pete, in 1988. Schnell Fenster released two studio albums, The Sound of Trees (1988) and Ok Alright a Huh Oh Yeah (1990), before disbanding in 1992. At the ARIA Music Awards of 1989 they were nominated for Breakthrough Artist – Album for The Sound of Trees, Breakthrough Artist – Single for "Whisper" and Best Cover Art for Judd's graphic art.

== History ==
Schnell Fenster (schnelles Fenster is German for "fast window") were formed in Melbourne as a pop, rock group in 1986 by Noel Crombie on drums and percussion (ex-Split Enz, the Slaughtermen), Michael den Elzen on lead guitar (ex-Broderick Smith Band, Tim Finn Band, Stephen Cummings Band), Nigel Griggs on bass guitar and backing vocals (ex-Octopus, Steve Hillage's Khan [both in England], Split Enz), Phil Judd on lead vocals and guitar (ex-Split Enz, Suburban Reptiles, the Swingers) and Eddie Rayner on keyboards and piano (ex-Orb, Split Enz, Space Waltz). The band claimed the name to be derived from "the nickname given to an experimental steam locomotive built in the 1930s. It reached incredible speeds but was declared unsafe", but there exists no written testimony for the validity of that anecdote beyond that statement in the article. Rayner left soon after its formation to join the Rock Party and later was a touring member of Crowded House – another Split Enz-related group.

Laurence Boswell of The Canberra Times interviewed Crombie in August 1987; Boswell asserted, "For me, Noel personified the intersection of music and art on the fringe. He was an essential ingredient of the Split Enz magic – in sound, performance and image. His percussion was perfection, his spoon solos bedazzled, and those haircuts and clothes!" For Crombie the group "began as a kind of a hobby — 'an enthusiasts' band'. As rehearsals developed the music into full-fledged songs, the decision was made to work towards recording an album. Live gigs will be a rarity until the album is released." He continued, "after a year, we're keen to get into a studio. We've got a lot of songs together and we're keen to get them recorded."

In August 1987 Crombie indicated they were working on the soundtrack for a feature film, Rikky and Pete (1988). Rayner was "working on the film as well, doing the underscore." (see The Makers) Noel's Cowards, formed as a studio-only ensemble, consisted of the extant Schnell Fenster members, plus Wendy Matthews (vocals), Michael Harris (fiddle), Louis McManus (mandolin), Vika Bull and Lisa Edwards (backing vocals). They provided six "country-tinged" tracks for Rikky and Pete and the related single, "Fingers Crossed", in 1988. Schnell Fenster's track, "Run a Mile", was also used on the soundtrack.

Schnell Fenster released their debut studio album, The Sound of Trees, in September 1988 via EMI Records/Warner Music Australasia for the Australasian market and Atlantic Records, internationally. The music was composed by all four members with lyrics written by Judd. They had signed with EMI in January of that year after, "it became evident that actual songs were emerging from these [jam] sessions, the band started recording demo tapes." The album was co-produced by the group with English producers, Clive Langer and Alan Winstanley, at Platinum Studios, Melbourne. It peaked in the ARIA top 100.

Another The Canberra Times reporter, Kathryn Whitfield opined that the album's, "music is bizarre, though not extraordinary. It is similar in parts to those weird wonders produced by the Cure. These off-beat ditties are all over the place like a dog's dinner, with synthesised gurgles crashing about the seemingly opium-induced lyrics... coupled with the high-pitched whining vocals of Judd, it is more than one person should have to bear."

Boswell and Whitfield's fellow journalist, Amanda Lynch, described the group's debut single, "Whisper" (August), which "has a subtle Split Enz feel to it but in general, the music of Schnell Fenster is very different. It lacks the clarity and energetic enthusiasm that was the Split Enz trademark." "Whisper" peaked in top 60 in Australia and top 50 in New Zealand.

At the ARIA Music Awards of 1989 the group were nominated for Breakthrough Artist – Album for The Sound of Trees, Breakthrough Artist – Single for "Whisper" and Best Cover Art for Judd's graphic art. The album had provided two further singles, "Love-Hate Relationship" (late 1988) and "This Illusion" (1989). The band performed across Australia to promote their material and then toured New Zealand in 1989, as a support act for Crowded House. Renewed interest in Split Enz had led to an American album release later that year, but with no tour and little record company support, it did not chart there.

Schnell Fenster's second album, Ok Alright a Huh Oh Yeah, was released in 1990. It was produced by the group and included Venetta Fields on backing vocals. They had recorded it at Metropolis Music and Effects Platinum, Atlanta. AllMusic's Chris Woodstra observed, "Though the songs aren't quite as strong as those on the debut [album, it] is still a solid, well produced effort, worthwhile for longtime Split Enz fans." Crombie's worsening tinnitus led to cessation of touring, and Schnell Fenster disbanded in 1992. Woodstra related how former members were, "playing a more active role behind the scenes in the music business."

== Members ==
Schnell Fenster

- Noel Crombie – drums and percussion (1986–92)
- Michael den Elzen – lead guitar, guitar synth, fretless guitar, keyboards (1986–92)
- Nigel Griggs – bass guitar, backing vocals (1986–92)
- Phil Judd – guitar, trumpet, keyboards, lead vocals (1986–92)
- Eddie Rayner – keyboards, piano (1986)

Noel's Cowards

- Vika Bull – backing vocals (1988)
- Noel Crombie – drums (1988)
- Michael den Elzen – guitar (1988)
- Lisa Edwards – backing vocals (1988)
- Nigel Griggs – bass guitar (1988)
- Michael Harris – violin (1988)
- Phil Judd – guitar (1988)
- Wendy Matthews – lead vocals (1988)
- Louis McManus – mandolin (1988)

== Discography ==
=== Albums ===
List of albums, with selected details and chart positions
Title	Details	Peak chart positions
Title	Details	AUS
The Sound of Trees	Released: October 1988; Label: EMI/WEA; Catalogue: CDP790929, 9031-71157-2, 820912	82
Ok Alright a Huh Oh Yeah	Released: July 1991; Label: WEA; Catalogue: 9031-72264-2	117

=== Singles ===
List of singles, with selected chart positions
Title	Year	Peak chart positions		Album
Title	Year	AUS	NZ	Album
"Whisper"	1988	56	42	The Sound of Trees
"Love-Hate Relationship"	1988	83	46	The Sound of Trees
"This Illusion"	1989	152	—	The Sound of Trees
"Ok Alright a Huh Oh Yeah"	1990	88	—	Ok Alright a Huh Oh Yeah
"Heroes Let You Down"	1991	132	—	Ok Alright a Huh Oh Yeah
"—" denotes a recording that did not chart or was not released in that territory.

=== Other appearances ===
- Rikky and Pete (soundtrack, 1988): – "Run a Mile" (by Schnell Fenster); "Fingers Crossed", "Cold Shoulder", "In the Dark", "Tears of Joy", "Just Like You", "Hard to Believe" (by Noel's Cowards).
- Sweetie (soundtrack, 1989): – "Whisper", "This Illusion", "That's Impossible" (by Schnell Fenster)
- The Big Steal (soundtrack, 1990): – "Fun City" (by Schnell Fenster)
- Various Artists: Other Enz: Split Enz & Beyond (compilation album, 1999): – "Fingers Crossed", "Just Like You", "Cold Shoulder" (by Noel's Cowards with Wendy Matthews); "Whisper", "Ok Alright a Huh Oh Yeah" (by Schnell Fenster)

== Awards and nominations ==
=== ARIA Music Awards ===
The ARIA Music Awards is an annual awards ceremony that recognises excellence, innovation, and achievement across all genres of Australian music. They commenced in 1987.

Year	Nominee / work	Award	Result	Ref.
1989	The Sound of Trees	Breakthrough Artist – Album	Nominated	
1989	"Whisper"	Breakthrough Artist – Single	Nominated	
1989	Phil Judd for Schnell Fenster The Sound of Trees	Best Cover Art	Nominated	
