= Malcolm (film) =

1986 Australian film by Nadia Tass

- Australian DVD cover
- Directed by: Nadia Tass
- Written by: David Parker
- Produced by: David Parker; Nadia Tass; Tim White
- Starring: Colin Friels; John Hargreaves; Lindy Davies; Chris Haywood; Bud Tingwell
- Cinematography: David Parker
- Edited by: Ken Sallows
- Music by: Paul Coppens; Simon Jeffes
- Production company: Cascade Films
- Distributed by: Hoyts Distribution
- Release date: 18 July 1986
- Running time: 90 minutes
- Country: Australia
- Language: English
- Budget: A$1 million
- Box office: $3.48 million (Australia)

Malcolm is a 1986 Australian crime comedy film, written by the husband-and-wife team of David Parker and Nadia Tass, and directed by Nadia Tass (in her debut feature film as director). The film stars Colin Friels as Malcolm, a tram enthusiast who becomes involved with a pair of would-be bank robbers. His co-stars are Lindy Davies and John Hargreaves. The film won the 1986 Australian Film Institute Award for Best Film, and seven other AFI awards including Best Original Screenplay and Best Director.

== Plot ==
At the start of the film, Malcolm is working for the Metropolitan Transit Authority (then operator of Melbourne's trams). Malcolm, who has autism (see "Development & Production" section below), is obsessed with trams, but he is also a mechanical genius whose modest inner-city cottage is fitted with a variety of remarkable gadgets. When his boss (Bud Tingwell) discovers that Malcolm has built himself a cut-down tram during work time and using work materials, and has taken it out on the tracks, Malcolm is sacked. With his mother dead and no other income, the local shop-owner advises him to take in a boarder, Frank (John Hargreaves). Frank's brassy girlfriend Judith (Lindy Davies) soon moves in with him, and Frank reveals that he is a petty criminal who has recently been released from prison. Despite their differences, the trio develop an awkward friendship.

When Malcolm learns of Frank and Jude's plans to stage a robbery, he decides to use his technical ingenuity to help them. In his first demonstration, he shows Frank the "getaway car" he has built, which splits into two independently powered halves, and they use this to successfully elude police after Frank steals some cash from a bank customer. For his next demonstration, Malcolm stages a near-successful hold-up of a payroll delivery, using a radio-controlled model car and trailer, fitted with a video camera, a speaker, and a gun loaded with blanks with which to threaten the guards. Frank walks in on Malcolm's bedroom "control centre" while the robbery is in progress; joining in, he helps Malcolm to steal the cash, although it is eventually lost when the planned getaway route (through a street drain) proves too small and the bag of cash is knocked off the trailer.

The trio then devises an audacious plot to steal the weekly $250,000 cash delivery from a major bank, and Malcolm collaborates with Frank and Jude to create a set of ingenious inventions. They plant a set of armed, remote-controlled motorised robot rubbish bins inside the bank, which are then secretly manoeuvered up to an overhead walkway between the two bank buildings. When the guards cross the walkway with the cash on a trolley, they are bailed up by the robot bins. With Frank's specially modified Ford Transit delivery van, stationed below, a spring-loaded arm fitted with a hammer swings up, breaks the glass of the walkway window, and the robots push the cash into a chute fitted into the roof of the van. The trio then make their escape, stopping in a lane to disguise the van as an ice-cream truck; they also set loose a Ned Kelly-like dummy in a radio-controlled wheelchair, armed with two shotguns, which they send out as a decoy for the police while they make their escape. They manage to elude the pursuing police, but they are nearly caught when two officers on a routine patrol pull up beside them and ask them for an ice-cream. Frank speeds away, with the police in hot pursuit, and they now employ their backup getaway plan. They dump the van in a suburban street and decamp on foot, but when the police arrive moments later and scan the area for the fugitives, they see only the back of a tram, pulling away into the distance. However, when we see the front of the tram, it is revealed to be Malcolm's custom-made mini-tram, with the trio and their loot aboard.

In the final scene, Frank is leaving a bank in Lisbon, Portugal (another city with a major tram network) where he has just deposited the proceeds of the Melbourne robbery. He then meets up with Malcolm and Jude at a local cafe, and as the film concludes they lay plans for another daring heist.

== Cast ==
- Colin Friels as Malcolm
- Bud Tingwell as Tram Depot Supervisor
- John Hargreaves as Frank Baker
- Lindy Davies as Judith
- Chris Haywood as Willy
- David Johnston as News Reporter
- Denise Scott as Willy's Wife
- Ian McFadyen as Model Shop Salesman
- Heather Mitchell as Barmaid
- Mike Bishop as Armed Guard
- Peter Hosking as Bank Nightwatchman

== Development and production ==
David Parker wrote the screenplay, filmed, and co-produced the film with Nadia Tass, who also directed. They collaborated with New Zealand producer Tim White, who was associate producer on the film. Parker had never written a script before and he did it while working on location of Burke and Wills as a stills photographer. Raising money was very difficult. Channel Seven agreed to provide $175,000 as a presale, Film Victoria came in for $100,000, and the rest of the movie was raised from Parker and Tass mortgaging their house and via a piece of tax legislation known as 10BA.

All of the gadgets in Malcolm's house and the ingenious inventions used in the robbery sequences were devised by writer Parker.

The character of Malcolm was inspired – according to the film's closing credits – by Tass' late brother, John Tassopoulos, who died after suffering an epileptic seizure after being hit by a car in 1983. As portrayed by Friels, Malcolm exhibits many traits that are characteristic of someone with high-functioning autism or Asperger syndrome, including deep-focus, obsessive personal interests, poor social skills, an unusual gait, and a reluctance to make eye contact. The character, Malcolm Hues, is phonetically the exact same name as a classmate of David Parker's. The only difference is in the spelling of the last name. This individual also demonstrated inventiveness and idiosyncratic behaviour, but was never mentioned or credited.

=== Filming locations ===
The scenes of the exterior of Malcolm's house were filmed at 23 Napoleon Street, Collingwood. The house has since been demolished and redeveloped with apartments. The interior scenes were filmed at a house in John Street, Flemington, an inner city suburb of Melbourne.

A façade was constructed in Napoleon Street for the exterior scenes of the Milk Bar. The interior scenes were filmed at the former milk bar located on Peel Street near Napoleon Street.

The Leinster Arms Hotel, located in Gold Street, Collingwood, was used for filming the inside scenes at the pub Frank often frequents.

The scenes of the headquarters of the fictional Anglo Swiss Bank were filmed at two locations. The building where Frank and Judith deliver a number of ashtrays is the Commonwealth Bank in Collins Street near the intersection with Queen Street. All signage related to the Commonwealth Bank was removed for the purpose of filming.

The overhead bridge featured in the robbery of the bank is located at the William Angliss TAFE, on La Trobe Street.

The tram depot featured in the beginning of the film is the former South Melbourne tram depot which was located on Kingsway at the corner of Dorcas Street (and is now a BMW dealer). Kew tram depot features briefly in a dawn scene of a tram depot, prior to Malcolm taking his own tram for a test run. The foreman's office in which Malcolm is sacked is located in the body shop at Preston Workshops. The scene in which Malcolm, Frank and Judith switch from a getaway van to Malcolm's tram was filmed near the Workshops in Miller Street, Thornbury.

=== Vehicles ===
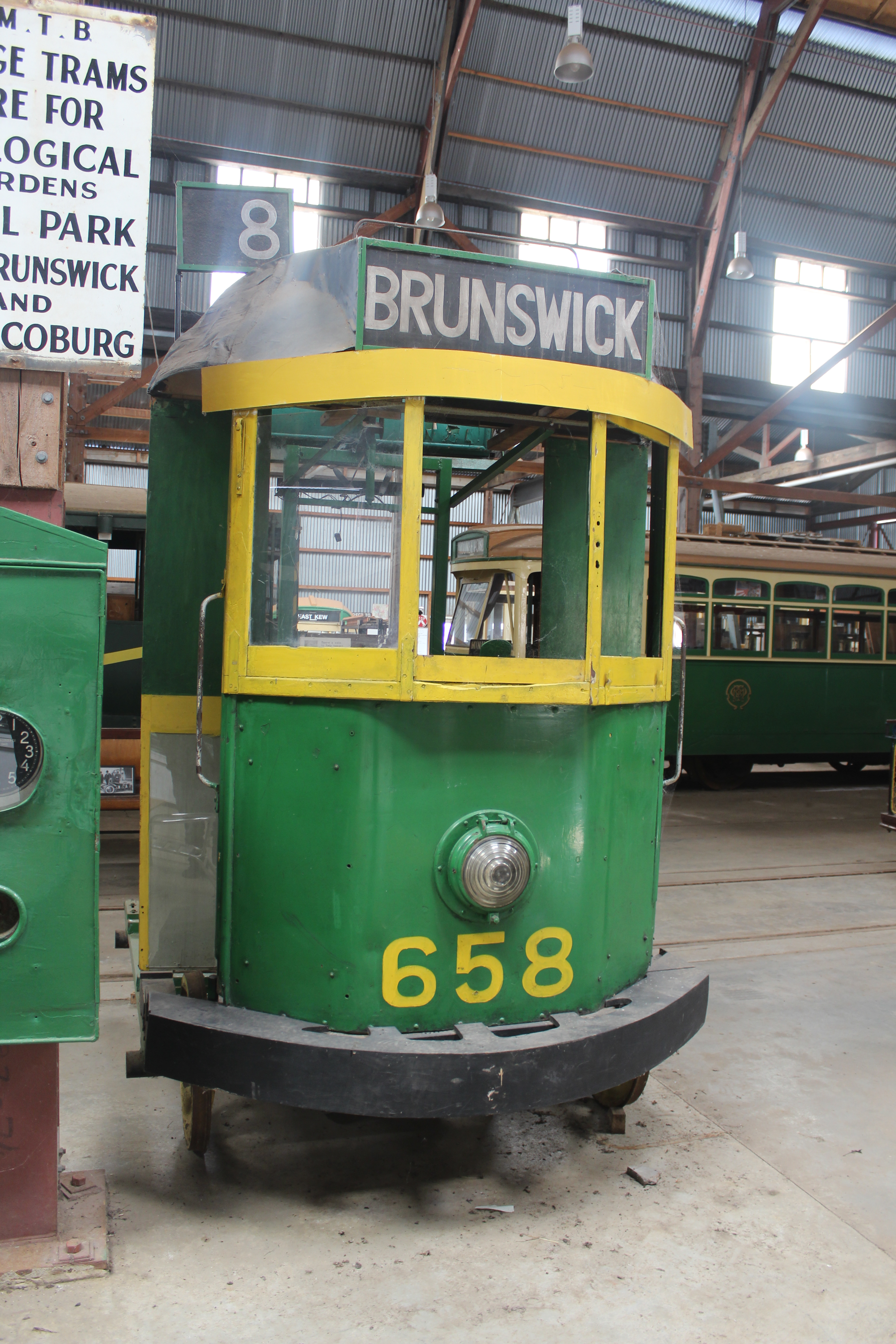
The tram from the film Malcolm, at the Tramway Museum Society of Victoria's museum

The model tram that Malcolm "built" ran on a motorbike engine, the rest having been put together by Ian McClay. A wooden pole was used to simulate the power input pole. After the film was completed, the tram was donated to the Tramway Museum Society of Victoria.

The split car gag was achieved with three different Honda Zs. One was tricked up with two motorbikes bought from Albert Park Golf Club - these were the split cars that the stunt riders drove in the movie. The second car was used for the actors on a caravan base towed behind a tracking vehicle generously donated for the job by Sydney grip, Ray Brown. The third car remained as a driveable - pre-split car. It is now housed in Cascade Films Foyer in South Melbourne. The drivable split car is now stored at the National Film and Sound Archive, Canberra.

The remote-controlled car used by Malcolm to rob his first bank is a Tamiya Sand Scorcher, model number 58016.

All the remote control cars, including the ashtrays, were built by David Parker, Tony Mahood and Ian McClay. The split cars were built by Tony Mahood, Steve Mills (from Ted's Camera Store) and David Parker.

The staged television news item which screens during the movie, detailing Malcolm's failed remote-control payroll robbery was read by Channel Ten Melbourne news reader David Johnston.

== Music ==
The music used in the film was composed by Simon Jeffes and performed by him and fellow members of the Penguin Cafe Orchestra.

== Reception ==
=== Box office ===
Malcolm grossed AU$3,482,129 at the box office in Australia, indicating it was a box office success, having made back more than three times its budget.

=== Critical response ===
On Rotten Tomatoes, the film has 3 positive reviews and 1 negative review, indicating an approval rating of 75%. The vast majority of critics both modern and contemporary had a glowing reception of the film, indicating critical acclaim. A regular point of praise, was the film's lead character, Malcolm's characterisation.

Walter Goodman of The New York Times wrote: "Malcolm is likable, albeit a touch slow, and the same can be said of the new Australian comedy that bears his name." In the Los Angeles Times, critic Sheila Benson wrote a commendatory review saying "Now from Australia we have just such a delight -- "Malcolm", a dazzlingly inventive, tender and utterly unpretentious comedy.

Desson Howe of The Washington Post wrote a negative review: "The story line meanders like a sunstroked wallaby, the hackneyed characters fail to interact logically or even interestingly, and the gadgets are just so many mildly diverting toys."

In a modern review, Luke Buckmaster from The Guardian hailed "Malcolm", stating, "this quaint and endearing film.... neatly establishes its antihero as a screwy genius who moves to his own mechanically engineered beat" and concluding, "Malcolm is a clever and oddly warming oddity: a crime caper in which nobody gets their comeuppance and which doesn't condescend, nor turns a blind eye to the peculiarities of its lead character."

=== Accolades ===
Award	Category	Subject	Result
AACTA Awards (1986 AFI Awards)	Best Direction	Nadia Tass	Won
AACTA Awards (1986 AFI Awards)	Best Film	Nadia Tass	Won
AACTA Awards (1986 AFI Awards)	Best Film	David Parker	Won
AACTA Awards (1986 AFI Awards)	Best Original Screenplay	David Parker	Won
AACTA Awards (1986 AFI Awards)	Best Actor	Colin Friels	Won
AACTA Awards (1986 AFI Awards)	Best Supporting Actor	John Hargreaves	Won
AACTA Awards (1986 AFI Awards)	Best Supporting Actress	Lindy Davies	Won
AACTA Awards (1986 AFI Awards)	Best Editing	Ken Sallows	Won
AACTA Awards (1986 AFI Awards)	Best Sound	Craig Carter	Won
AACTA Awards (1986 AFI Awards)	Best Sound	Paul Clark	Won
AACTA Awards (1986 AFI Awards)	Best Sound	Dean Gawen	Won
AACTA Awards (1986 AFI Awards)	Best Sound	Roger Savage	Won
AWGIE Award	Best Writing in a Feature Film - Original	David Parker	Won

== Home media ==
Malcolm was released on DVD by Umbrella Entertainment in November 2001. The DVD is compatible with all region codes and includes special features, such as the trailer, a photo montage, location map, the press kit, a Popcorn Taxi Q&A, More Malcolm Gizmos and audio commentary with Nadia Tass and David Parker. In 2021, Umbrella Entertainment released a region-free Blu-ray of Malcolm, retaining the special features from the DVD release and adding exclusive new features.
