= Hercules Returns =

- Poster
- Directed by: David Parker
- Written by: Des Mangan
- Produced by: Philip Jaroslow
- Starring: David Argue; Michael Carman; Mary Coustas; Bruce Spence
- Cinematography: David Connell
- Edited by: Peter Carrodus
- Music by: Phil Judd
- Production company: Phim Productions
- Distributed by: Roadshow Film Distributors
- Release date: 1993
- Running time: 82 minutes
- Country: Australia
- Language: English

Hercules Returns is a 1993 Australian comedy film directed by David Parker, starring David Argue, Michael Carman, Bruce Spence and Mary Coustas. The film has become a cult film in Australia and other countries. It has been released in DVD format (Region 4, format 16:9).

It was the first feature directed by David Parker although he had written and produced a number of other films.

== Synopsis ==
Film buff Brad McBain, a frustrated employee of Australia's largest cinema chain, The Kent Corporation, quits his job and decides to set up and re-open the Picture Palace, a palatial disused cinema in St Kilda, Melbourne, to show classic old films in the old-fashioned style.

As a gimmick he chooses the last picture that the cinema featured, Samson and His Mighty Challenge (an Italian film, originally released in 1964 as Ercole, Sansone, Maciste e Ursus: gli invincibili). When the print arrives at the grand gala opening they discover that it is in unsubtitled Italian, and Brad suspects that his old boss, Sir Michael Kent, has in some way sabotaged the delivery so that McBain can fail at his achievement and keep Kent's business running successfully.

This calls for desperate measures and McBain, his projectionist Sprocket and his publicist Lisa are forced to improvise voice-overs for the entire film with hilarious results. Kent also attends the screening, hoping to see it fail. As he realises that the crowd is enjoying the film, he storms up to the projection box. He and McBain fight just as the film reaches its climax; McBain breaks the fourth wall several times so that the fight in the projection box corresponds with the fight on the screen. Kent is knocked out, and the film is a huge success.

== Cast ==
- David Argue as Brad McBain
- Michael Carman as Sir Michael Kent
- Mary Coustas as Lisa
- Bruce Spence as Sprocket
- Des Mangan as voices of Hercules, Samson, Machismo, Ursus, Testiculi
- Sally Patience as voices of Labia, Muriel, Fanny, Delilah
- Matthew King as voice of Charlie
- Frank Thring as voice of Zeus

== Background and production ==
Hercules Returns is a screen adaptation of the popular Australian live comedy show Double Take, conceived and performed by Des Mangan with Sally Patience. The Double Take show, which began in Sydney in 1986, is part of the "dub parody" genre, similar to What's Up, Tiger Lily?, in which ostensibly serious films are deliberately re-voiced in a satirical or spoof manner.

Mangan and Patience gained a strong following around Australia with their Double Take shows, which were performed live in a cinema. Typically seated at the back of the auditorium, using microphones plugged into the cinema's sound system, the Double Take team performed live comedic voice-overs of movies such as the 1935 American science fiction Western movie The Phantom Empire starring Gene Autry, "the Singing Cowboy", the 1953 American film noir crime drama film Dance Hall Racket, the 1968 American B-grade sci-fi film The Astro-Zombies, and the 1965 Italian low-budget 'Sword and Sandal' epic Ercole, Sansone, Maciste e Ursus gli invincibili (i.e., Hercules, Samson, Maciste, and Ursus: the Invincibles).

The film version came about after businessman Phil Jaroslow saw a ''Double Take performance of Hercules Returns in Melbourne. He was so impressed that he purchased the rights to both the original Ercole film and Mangan's script, hired cinematographer and filmmaker David Parker to help write a story to wrap around the Double Take routine, and financed the project with his own funds. Although it was his first film as a producer and Parker's first as a director, the project came in on time and on budget at a cost of less than A$1 million, and shooting was completed in just eight days.

Mark Hartley, in his first film credit, was "music video director" for the film. David Connell was cinematographer, Phil Judd composed the music, and Peter Carrodus edited the film. The film was shot in 1992.

The film was the last screen credit for veteran actor Frank Thring (who performed the voice of Zeus), and there are also cameo appearances by Australian film critics David Stratton, Margaret Pomeranz, and Ivan Hutchinson. Mangan and Patience do not appear on screen and their voice-overs are mimed by Argue, Spence, and Coustas.

== Release ==
The film had its world premiere at Sundance Film Festival on 28 January 1993, before screening at the Seattle International Film Festival, Washington Film Festival, and Venice Film Festival later that same year.

Hercules Returns was released in Australian cinemas on 16 September 1993. It was subsequently selected for screening at the Denver Film Festival and Helsinki International Film Festival in 1994, and in 1995 screened at San Diego International Film Festival.

== Box office ==
Hercules Returns grossed A$318,788 at the box office in Australia.

== Reception ==
Hercules Returns received mixed reviews from critics at the time of its release; some praised the humour, while others criticised the plot and structure. However, the film has since gained a cult following. As of 2019, it had an audience rating of 95% on review aggregator website Rotten Tomatoes.

== ARIA Music Awards ==
The ARIA Music Awards are a set of annual ceremonies presented by Australian Recording Industry Association (ARIA), which recognise excellence, innovation, and achievement across all genres of the music of Australia. They commenced in 1987.

Year	Nominee / work	Award	Result	Ref.
1994	Hercules Returns	Best Comedy Release	Nominated	

== See also ==
- Cinema of Australia
