= Gregor Zupanc =

Serbian film and television director

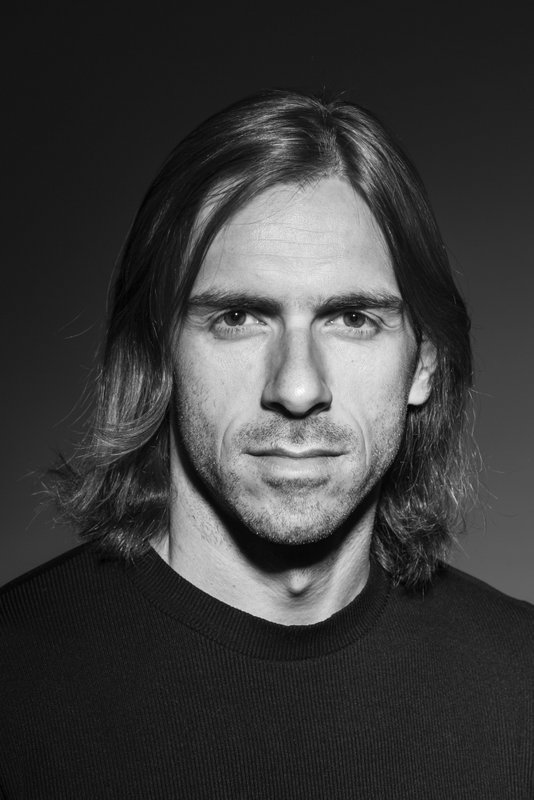
- Born: 5 July 1976 (age 49); Belgrade, PR Serbia, FPR Yugoslavia
- Occupations: director, writer, music video director, tv producer.
- Years active: 1997–present
- Notable work: Pećina, Mediteran, Moj lični pečat, Radiovizija

Gregor Zupanc (born 5 July 1976) is a Serbian film and television director.

== Career ==
His feature film Mediteran was shown at the Independent Film Festival in Los Angeles in December 2008 and premiered domestically in 2009.

In 2011, he co-directed the drama series Igrač which aired on RTS.

In 2012 and 2013, Zupanc created and produced Moj Lični Pečat, an educational series which presents stories by famous people in the realm of art, culture and science.

In the fall of 2015, RTS began airing the mini-series Radiovizija directed by Zupanc. The series focuses on the stories of famous Belgrade residents based on the archives of Radio Belgrade.

== Filmography ==
- Ka. K. (1998) – produced by RTS
- Rez (1999) – produced by Dunav Film
- Osnivači Slavije (1999) – produced by Dunav film
- Pećina (The Cave) (1999) – produced by Dunav film
- Ulicom Sedam Mladih (2003) – produced by RTS
- Personal and Other Stories from Belgrade and Pristina (2011) – supported by the Open Society Foundations
- Lestvica (The Scale) (2005) – produced by RTS
- Mediteran (2008) – produced by the Akademski Filmski Centar (AFC)

== Television ==
- Igrač (2011)
- Radiovizija (2014–15)
