= Rikky and Pete =

1988 Australian movie by Nadia Tass

- Film poster
- Directed by: Nadia Tass
- Written by: David Parker
- Produced by: David Parker; Nadia Tass; Tim White
- Starring: Stephen Kearney; Nina Landis; Tetchie Agbayani; Bill Hunter; Bruno Lawrence; Bruce Spence; Lewis Fitz-Gerald; Dorothy Alison; Don Reid
- Cinematography: David Parker
- Edited by: Ken Sallows
- Music by: Eddie Rayner; Brian Baker; Phil Judd (songs)
- Production companies: Film Victoria; Cascade Films
- Distributed by: United Artists (MGM/UA Communications)
- Release date: 1988
- Running time: 101 minutes
- Country: Australia
- Language: English
- Budget: A$4million
- Box office: A$1,071,875 (Australia)

Rikky and Pete is a 1988 Australian film directed by Nadia Tass, written by David Parker, and starring Stephen Kearney and Nina Landis.

== Plot ==
Rikky Menzies is an out-of-work geologist and aspiring singer. Her brother Pete Menzies is a misfit inventor. To find peace of mind and escape the ire of Police Sergeant Whitstead, they travel the outback of Australia until they reach the desert mining town of Mount Isa and its own zany individualists.

== Cast ==
- Stephen Kearney as Pete Menzies
- Nina Landis as Rikky Menzies
- Tetchie Agbayani as Flossie
- Bill Hunter as Whitstead
- Bruno Lawrence as Sonny
- Bruce Spence as Ben
- Lewis Fitz-Gerald as Adam
- Dorothy Alison as Mrs. Menzies
- Don Reid as Mr. Menzies
- Peter Cummins as Delahunty
- Peter Hehir as Desk Sergeant
- Ralph Cotterill as George Pottinger
- Roderick Williams as Holy Joe
- Denis Lees as Fingers
- Robert Baxter as Truckyard Man
- Alan Hopgood as Laughing uncle
- Christopher Mayer as Eureka Tavern drinker

== Production ==
Rikky and Pete was directed by Nadia Tass, written by David Parker, and produced jointly by both, co-produced by New Zealand producer Tim White.

While United Artists provided $3 million of the budget, the rest of the money raised privately in Australia through 10BA. Shooting took place in Melbourne and Broken Hill.

== Reception ==
=== Box office ===
Rikky and Pete grossed A$1,071,875 at the box office in Australia, which is equivalent to $2,014,185 in 2009 dollars.

== Soundtrack ==
Most of the songs on the album were written and/or performed by alumni of Split Enz and their later bands Crowded House, The Makers, and Schnell Fenster.

Rikky and Pete – Original Motion Picture Soundtrack
No.	Title	Writer(s)	Performer(s)	Length
1.	"Pete's Theme" (a.k.a. "Rikky and Pete (Theme)")	Anthony Edward Rayner, Brian Baker	The Makers	1:51
2.	"Recurring Dream" (originally by the Mullanes)	Neil Finn, Paul Hester, Craig Hooper, Nick Seymour	Crowded House	2:52
3.	"Rikky's Sample"	Rayner, Baker	The Makers	0:42
4.	"Fingers Crossed"	Phil Judd	Noel's Cowards	2:38
5.	"Cold Shoulder"	Judd	Noel's Cowards	2:29
6.	"In the Dark"	Judd	Noel's Cowards	2:56
7.	"Tears of Joy"	Judd	Noel's Cowards	2:50
8.	"Just Like You"	Judd	Noel's Cowards	2:28
9.	"Hard to Believe"	Judd	Noel's Cowards	2:51
10.	"Pete's Ride"	Rayner, Baker	The Makers	1:46
11.	"As Good as It Gets"	Rayner, Baker	The Makers	1:10
12.	"Run a Mile"	Noel Crombie, Michael den Elzen, Nigel Griggs, Judd	Schnell Fenster	3:02
13.	"Return to Melbourne"	Rayner, Baker	The Makers	1:02
14.	"Perfect World"	Chris Stockley	Blue Healers	2:43
15.	"Couldn't Happen to a Nicer Guy"	Rayner, Baker	The Makers	1:08
16.	"Last Call for Love"	Keith Glass	Keith Glass and the Honky Tonks	2:39
17.	"How Many More Moves"	Glass	Keith Glass and the Honky Tonks	3:31
18.	"Hell of a Job"	Glass	Keith Glass and the Honky Tonks	3:51
19.	"Whitstead"	Rayner, Baker	The Makers	1:25
Total length:				43:45

Credits:
