= Matching Jack =

- Australian poster
- Directed by: Nadia Tass
- Screenplay by: Lynne Renew; David Parker
- Story by: Lynne Renew
- Produced by: Richard Keddie; David Parker; Nadia Tass
- Starring: Jacinda Barrett; James Nesbitt; Tom Russell; Kodi Smit-McPhee; Richard Roxburgh
- Cinematography: David Parker
- Edited by: Mark Warner
- Music by: Paul Grabowsky
- Production company: Cascade Films
- Distributed by: 20th Century Fox
- Release date: 19 August 2010
- Running time: 103 minutes
- Country: Australia
- Language: English
- Box office: $258,011

Matching Jack is a 2010 Australian drama film directed by Nadia Tass from a screenplay by Lynne Renew and David Parker, based on an unfilmed script by Renew entitled Love and Mortar.

== Plot ==
Life seems idyllic for Marisa and her son, Jack, until a poor performance at a school soccer match ends with Jack in hospital and Marisa trying to find her husband, David, who is interstate at a conference. In fact, David is planning to leave Marisa for his current mistress, Veronica, with his phone off and not a care in the world.

Jack is diagnosed with leukaemia and the only possibility of a cure is if David has had a child from one of his many flings who could be a bone marrow donor. Marisa looks back through his diaries, figures when he could have been having affairs, and goes out door knocking. Unsuspecting women face a desperate mother as Marisa searches high and low for possibilities and the full scale of David's infidelity is revealed.

Meanwhile, Jack befriends Finn, a young Irish boy in the next bed. He has been travelling the world with his father, Connor. Initial disdain turns to mutual respect as both Marisa and Connor find their own ways to deal with their respective sons' illnesses. Whilst during this as David convinces a now pregnant Veronica to keep the child hoping it will be a viable donor for Jack, at the same time Marisa comes across Janice, whose defiantly rebellious fifteen-year-old daughter Kerry might just be David's daughter making her an older paternal half-sister and therefore a life saver for Jack. But although Kerry (overjoyed on having a possible sibling and to be a notable protective and supporting big sister) is more than keen to help her supposedly new found younger brother, her mother Janice has other ideas on giving her consent for helping Jack.

== Cast ==
- Jacinda Barrett as Marissa
- James Nesbitt as Connor, an Irish sailor
- Tom Russel as Jack, Marissa's son
- Kodi Smit-McPhee as Finn, Connor's son, who befriends Jack
- Richard Roxburgh as David, Marissa's unfaithful husband
- Julia Harari as Young Doctor
- Yvonne Strahovski as Veronica, David's pregnant mistress
- Alexandra Schepisi as Janice, a previous fling of David
- Nicole Gulasekharam as Kerry, Janice's rebel teenage daughter and possible half sister to Jack
- Gareth Yuen as Radiologist
- Amanda Muggleton as Home Nurse
- Julia Blake as Cleo
- Krista Vendy as Angela
- Daniela Farinacci as Ange
- Jane Clifton as Finn's doctor
- Cameron Nugent as Constable
- Jane Allsop as Marianne
- Victoria Eagger as Nurse Brackston

== Production ==
Matching Jack was directed by Nadia Tass and David Parker. The screenplay by Lynne Renew was based on an unfilmed script by Renew entitled Love and Mortar.

The hospital used for shooting the film was the old Royal Women's Hospital in Carlton, Melbourne.

The film was produced by Tass and Parker's studio Cascade Films, in association with the film investment agencies Film Victoria and Screen Australia. It was filmed on location in Melbourne in 2009.

== Release ==
Matching Jack premiered at the 2010 Melbourne International Film Festival. It also screened at Palm Beach International Film Festival, Cleveland International Film Festival, Belfast Film Festival, Internationales Filmwochenende Wurzburg (Wurzburg, Germany), Tiburon International Film Festival (Tiburon, California), and Newport Beach Film Festival (California). It was also screened in the out of competition section of the 10th Pune International Film Festival, in Pune, India.

20th Century Fox distributed it to 185 national screens in August 2010, the widest Fox release of an Australian film since 2008's Australia.

== Reception ==
Matching Jack opened at number eight at the Australian box office on its opening weekend, taking $258,011.

The film won Best Picture, Best Director and Best Screenplay at the 2011 Milan International Film Festival. Matching Jack was also honoured with Cannes Cinephile Prix de Jury Bel Age at the 2011 Cinephiles festival at Cannes in May 2011.

== Reviews ==
The film holds a score of 69% on Rotten Tomatoes.

Reviewers' comments included: Leonard Maltin: "A deeply emotional film, clearly made with tender loving care. Kodi Smit-McPhee gives an utterly remarkable performance in a cast full of fine actors".

David Stratton, The Australian: "Wonderfully acted and scripted… Smit-McPhee, particularly, brings grace, dignity and child-like optimism to his character, and he is heart-breakingly impressive as Finn".

David Tiley, Screenhub: "A terrific, passionate, sobby, craftful heartgrabber, a grown up film about a vast and honest emotional arc".

Jim Schembri, The Sydney Morning Herald: "It's a no-holds-bar emotional slam dunk as a young mother (superbly played by Jacinda Barrett) desperately searches for a bone marrow match for her son from among the illegitimate children fathered by her promiscuous husband (Richard Roxburgh). A beautiful, moving, unashamedly melodramatic film that rouses tears and joy in equal measure."
