= Phil Judd =

New Zealand musician

- Born: Philip Raymond Judd; 20 March 1953 (age 73); Hastings, New Zealand
- Genres: Rock; pop; vaudeville; alternative
- Occupations: Musician; producer; artist; singer; songwriter
- Instruments: Guitar; mandolin; ukulele; vocals
- Years active: 1972–present
- Formerly of: Split Enz, Schnell Fenster, The Swingers
- Website: www.philjudd.com

Philip Raymond Judd (born 20 March 1953) is a New Zealand singer-songwriter known for being one of the founders of the bands Split Enz and The Swingers.

== Split Enz ==
In 1972, Judd and Tim Finn founded the band Split Enz. Initially a folk band, they slowly moved towards a progressive/art rock style. In their early years, the band was known for its eccentric behaviour, wacky clothes, makeup and crazy hairstyles. During the initial stages, all the band members adopted their middle names, with the exception of Phil Judd, the only member from that era to use his first name.

While the other members of the group had hairstyles that were out of the ordinary, Judd chose to shave his head after the release of the first album Mental Notes. After the second album Second Thoughts was released, tension arose between Judd and Tim Finn. Judd left the band shortly after the release of the non-album single "Another Great Divide" in early 1977, to be replaced by Finn's younger brother Neil Finn.

After leaving Split Enz, Judd spent the rest of 1977 writing songs and recording demos. At the beginning of 1978, he was approached by Tim Finn to rejoin the band. Split Enz toured in 1978 with two lead guitarists in Judd and Neil Finn, who got along well. During this time the band played some new songs by Judd that won favour with the audience, including "Play It Strange", which keyboardist Eddie Rayner later named as a song he particularly liked, and regretted that Split Enz never recorded it.

Later that year, Judd once again left the group. It was after this time that Split Enz moved towards a more mainstream pop/new wave style, which led to their greatest international success.

== After Split Enz ==
After leaving Split Enz, Judd became involved with Auckland punk band The Suburban Reptiles. He produced their second single, "Saturday Night Stay at Home", and performed live with them. He was also briefly a member of Chris Knox's band The Enemy. Out of the remnants of The Suburban Reptiles he formed The Swingers with future Midnight Oil band member Bones Hillman and Buster Stiggs. The band went through a couple of lineup changes, but managed to release a No. 1 song in New Zealand and Australia, "Counting The Beat". The song was used in the 1990s on commercials for DEKA chain of general merchandise stores, and was also used for the New Zealand TV3 Slogan "There aint no place I'd rather be" in 2011. The Swingers also wrote songs for Gillian Armstrong's 1982 New Wave musical Starstruck.

After The Swingers broke up in 1982, Judd recorded the Private Lives solo album, released by Mushroom Records in 1983. It would be 24 years before he released his next solo album. In the US, selections from Private Lives were released as a five-track EP called The Swinger.

In 1986 Tim Finn contacted Judd to write some songs for his new album Big Canoe. It would have been the first time they were to write together since Split Enz. According to Finn, instead of writing, the two spent most of the time drinking and catching up on old times and wrote no material. Instead, Judd played guitar on the album.

== Schnell Fenster ==
In the late 1980s, Judd was a member of Schnell Fenster alongside former Split Enz members Nigel Griggs, Noel Crombie and Eddie Rayner, as well as guitarist Michael den Elzen. Rayner left the project soon after it began.

The debut album The Sound of Trees was a moderate success, but after Noel Crombie developed tinnitus, the band was unable to tour extensively to support the album. A second album, OK Alright A Huh Oh Yeah, was released in Australia and New Zealand in 1991 after which the group broke up.

== Film and television soundtracks ==
Judd has since worked in film and television. He was involved in recording movie soundtracks, such as The Big Steal; Death in Brunswick for which he won an AFI award; Rikky and Pete, Amy, and Mr Reliable. He also wrote music for television programs such as Good Guys Bad Guys, Stingers and Sky Trackers.

== Split Enz reunite without Judd ==
Judd has been reported as feeling bitter about not being invited to join Split Enz on their 2006 reunion tour. In an interview on community radio program Living in the Land of Oz, Judd said that Neil Finn wanted him to "get up and do two or three songs or at least be involved somehow" but this did not happen at either of the Melbourne concerts. On stage with the Enz in 2006, Tim Finn claimed that his relationship with Judd is "complicated".

Around the time of the Enz tour, Judd and Tim Finn had decided to get together with former Enz violinist Miles Golding for a few recording sessions dubbed 3 of a Kind. With the success of the Finn Brothers' latest album and the resurgence of interest in Split Enz, Tim Finn was offered a chance to release another solo album through EMI and took it. This left no time for any side projects and the project has not come to fruition.

== Solo work since 2006 ==
In 2006, Judd worked with Australian band Pinky Tuscadero, producing their EP Look Your Best.

He has released seven solo albums in the 21st century, as well as a collaboration with Roger Grierson as the UNthinkables.

== Visual art ==
Judd is also a highly skilled painter and his surrealistic portrayal of Split Enz for the band's 1975 Mental Notes album won a music industry award for best cover design. He has continued to paint over the years and has work in the National Gallery of Victoria.

== Personal life ==
In 1992, Judd was diagnosed with bipolar disorder. He suffered a stroke in 2004 which damaged his spleen.

Judd was convicted in March 2009 of stalking three sisters in his Melbourne neighbourhood. He received a 12-month suspended sentence. On 1 January 2010, Judd was jailed for two weeks for violating a restraining order brought against him by his ex-wife during a dispute over custody of their young son.

== Discography ==
=== Albums ===
List of albums, with selected details
Title	Details
Private Lives (titled The Swinger in the US)	Released: 1983; Format: LP, Cass; Label: Mushroom (L 37992)
Death in Brunswick	Released: 1991; Format: CD; Label: EastWest (903174188-2); Note: Soundtrack
Mr. Phudd & His Novelty Act	Released: 2006; Format: CD, Digital; Label: Mana Music
Love Is a Moron	Released: December 2008; Format: CD, Digital; Label: Native Tongue Music Publishing
Play It Strange	Released: 2014; Format: CD, Digital; Label: Phil Judd
Unique	Released: 2016; Format: CD, Digital; Label: Phil Judd
Flightless Bird	Released: 2019; Format: CD, Digital; Label: Phil Judd
Planet Sublime	Released: 2021; Format: CD, Digital; Label: Phil Judd
My Life as a Ghost	Released: 2023; Format: Digital; Label: Phil Judd

== Films ==
- Starstruck (1982) – music, actor (one of the Swingers)
- Rikky and Pete (1988) – songs, actor
- The Big Steal (1990) – music
- Death in Brunswick (1991) – music
- Eight Ball (1992) – music
- Hercules Returns (1992) – music
- "Environmental" (1994) (short) – music
- Mr. Reliable (1996) – music
- Amy (1998) – music

== TV ==
- Sky Trackers (1994) – music (with others)
- Good Guys Bad Guys (1997) – music, including theme
- Stingers (1998) – music, including theme

Music for several Melbourne Theatre Company plays 1989–1993 including Miss Bosnia, Cosi and Summer of the Aliens, directed by Nadia Tass.

Lyricist for The Lion The Witch & The wardrobe songs, A touring musical production 2001–2003.

== Awards and nominations ==
=== ARIA Music Awards ===
The ARIA Music Awards is an annual awards ceremony held by the Australian Recording Industry Association. They commenced in 1987.

Year	Nominee / work	Award	Result	Ref.
1992	Death in Brunswick	Best Original Soundtrack, Cast or Show Album	Nominated	
