= Nadia Tass =

Australian theatre and film director and producer

- Born: Nadia Tassopoulos c. 1959; Lofoi, Florina, Macedonia, Greece
- Occupations: Film director, theatre director, and film producer
- Years active: 1979–present
- Organization: Cascade Films
- Known for: Filmmaking with David Parker; Theatre direction
- Notable work: Malcolm (1986); The Big Steal (1990)
- Spouse: David Parker

Nadia Tass (born Tassopoulou or Tassopoulos; c. 1959), is an Australian theatre and film director and film producer. She mostly makes films with her writer-producer husband David Parker, through their production company Cascade Films. Tass is known for the films Malcolm (1986) and The Big Steal (1990), as well as an extensive body of work in the theatre, both in Australia and internationally.

== Early life and education ==
Nadia Tassopoulou (or Tassopoulos) was born in the village of Lofoi, near Florina, in Macedonia, northern Greece. Aged eight, she moved with her parents to Melbourne, Australia, in 1966. Her original surname is Tassopoulos. She has some Russian heritage.

She had her first acting role aged 14, in the police drama series Division 4.

Tass studied psychology at the University of Melbourne, and while there became interested in theatre, including works by students at the Victorian College of the Arts (VCA). After doing some theatre directing, she went to film school to learn technical aspects of filmmaking. In the 1980s she took a course in the Stanislavski method of acting, in Yugoslavia, and also later attended a film school in New York City.

== Career ==
=== Acting ===
Tass started her career acting in the first season of the television drama series Prisoner in 1979, playing Tessa Zervos, returning in 1983 to play a solicitor. She started directing works in Melbourne theatres around the same time. She has said that she loves working with actors, and her acting experience and training has informed her directing style.

=== Filmmaking ===
Tass has made many films with her husband and business partner, filmmaker David Parker, who has written, co-produced, and shot many of her films. They established Cascade Films in 1983, and co-produce their films.

Her debut feature film as a director was Malcolm, which she co-wrote with Parker. After Australian distributors were uninterested in the film, Tass, Parker, and collaborator Tim White took it to the United States, where there was a bidding war for it. Released in 1986, the film proved to be a critically acclaimed and box-office hit, winning 21 international awards and 8 Australian Film Institute Awards, including Best Film and Best Director.

In 1988, with the backing of United Artists in the US, Tass directed and co-produced the comedy Rikky and Pete, which was again successful around the world. The following year, she directed and produced The Big Steal (released in 1990), which won three and was nominated for six AFI Awards, as well as being an international hit.

Other feature film works by Tass include Mr. Reliable (1996), which won three AFI Awards; and Amy (1997), starring Rachel Griffiths and Ben Mendelsohn, which won 23 international awards.

Her first and only theatrical film directed in the United States was Pure Luck, produced for Universal Pictures and starring Martin Short and Danny Glover. It was released in August 1991.

In 1993, she produced the TV miniseries Stark, based on the bestselling novel by Ben Elton, which was later also released as a film.

From the 2000s, Tass directed several telemovies in the US, including The Miracle Worker (2000), Child Star: The Shirley Temple Story (2001), Undercover Christmas (2004), and Felicity: An American Girl Adventure (2005). Child Star: The Shirley Temple Story was an American Broadcasting Company TV film production of Shirley Temple's autobiography of the same name. Filmed by Parker, the film stars Ashley Rose Orr as Temple, Emily Anne Hart as teen Shirley, Connie Britton, Colin Friels, and Hinton Battle. It was filmed in Port Melbourne. She directed Fatal Honeymoon, a 2012 telemovie, produced by US cable channel Lifetime, starring Harvey Keitel. Tass has directed films and TV series for the BBC, CBS, Disney, Universal Studios, and Warner Bros.

Matching Jack, about a mother's search for a potential donor for her son with leukaemia, was shot by Parker. It premiered at the Melbourne International Film Festival in July 2010.

Oleg: The Oleg Vidov Story (2021), written by Cory Taylor, Gregor Zupanc, and Vidov, is a feature documentary about the Russian actor and filmmaker Oleg Vidov ("the Russian Robert Redford"), who defected from the USSR and went to the US in 1985, after being targeted by the Russian government led by Leonid Brezhnev. The film is narrated by Scottish actor Brian Cox, with Costa Ronin playing Oleg in flashbacks, and features interviews and archival footage with Walter Hill, Amanda Plummer, Arnold Schwarzenegger, Alexander Mitta, Milena Dravic, Mikhail Baryshnikov, and others. It had its world premiere at the Moscow International Film Festival in April 2021, and its Australian premiere at Cinefest OZ in Perth in August 2021. Tass had been friends with Vidov in the US, and owing to her Slavic heritage felt some connection to Russian culture, and both wanted to show some of the richness of that culture, but also the "criminals" who led the USSR. The film was screened on SBS TV and streamed on SBS On Demand from June 2021.

She has said about the process of filmmaking with her husband:

What it takes is a lot of knowledge and fastidiousness and dedication, and working with actors who are equally as dedicated… I just needed to make sure to lay out what we're gonna do, and then together we just create, and therein lies the joy.

=== Theatre direction ===
Tass has an extensive history of successful theatre direction with a diverse range of works, including both classical and contemporary theatre at La Mama, the Pram Factory, Playbox, the Melbourne Theatre Company, and the Open Stage Theatre at the University of Melbourne. Early works include productions of The Merchant of Venice, Macbeth, numerous plays by Euripides including Medea, and by Aristophanes including Lysistrata, Chekhov's The Birds, Three Sisters, and Blood Wedding by Federico Garcia Lorca. In later work, Tass directed This Effing Lady by Maureen Sherlock at the Brunswick Ballroom (2021) and Wicked Sisters by Alma De Groen for Griffin Theatre in Sydney (2020).

Tass' 2002 musical theatre production of The Lion, The Witch and The Wardrobe, an adaptation of C.S. Lewis' novel with the script written by Parker, toured Australia. It was well-reviewed, and garnered her a Helpmann Award nomination for Best Direction of a Musical.

In 2016, Tass directed the Ensemble Theatre production of Jane Cafarella's e-baby for its Sydney premiere.

In 2016 Tass directed Disgraced by Ayad Akhtar for the Melbourne Theatre Company (MTC), Extinction by Hannie Rayson for Red Stitch/GPAC, and The Book Club for AKA in London and Melbourne. Also in 2016, she directed an adaptation by Annie Baker of Uncle Vanya by Chekhov, for Red Stitch. Parker did the stage lighting for the production.

In 2018 Tass directed David Williamson's Sorting Out Rachel for Sydney's Ensemble Theatre, followed by Marisa Smith's Sex and Other Disturbances for Portland Stage in Maine, US; and Ear to the Edge of Time by Alana Valentine at The Seymour Centre in Sydney.

She directed Fern Hill by Michael Tucker for New Jersey Rep in 2018 and 2019 in Philadelphia and New York City.

Also in 2019, she directed Masterpieces of the Oral and Intangible Heritage of Humanity by Heather McDonald, a Pulitzer Prize finalist, for Signature Theatre in Washington, D.C.

== Other roles ==
Tass has presented masterclasses around the world. She regularly lectures at the Victorian College of the Arts (Melbourne), and at Deakin University, where she is an adjunct professor, and has taught at Beijing Normal University, Yunnan University, Wuhan University, Chongqing University, and Beijing Film Academy.

She has been a member of the board of the Australian Directors' Guild, and is a member of several professional associations, including the Directors Guild of America; the Screen Producers Association of Australia; the Australian Film Institute; and the Australian Academy of Cinema and Television Arts (AACTA). She is also patron of the ATOM Awards.

Tass has been appointed to the juries of many film festival juries, including:

- Hawaii International Film Festival – for judging of main awards 1988
- St Tropez Film Festival – head of jury 2008
- Asian Festival of First Films – 2008
- Pune International Film Festival – head of jury 2012
- Directors Guild of America (DGA) – documentary jury 2021
- Cinefest Oz – jury chair 2021
- AACTA – International chapter juror annually

== Honours and recognition ==
Tass' films have earned over 70 international awards and 23 Australian Film Institute (AFI) nominations, while garnering nine wins including Best Film and Best Director. Her films that have awards and nominations include, most notably, Malcolm (1986); Amy (1997); The Miracle Worker (2000); and Matching Jack (2010).

In theatre, The Lion, The Witch and The Wardrobe (2003) earned a nomination for Best Direction of a Musical in the Helpmann Awards.

In 2017, The Big Steal was screened at the Melbourne International Film Festival as part of Pioneering Women, a section dedicated to Australian women filmmakers of the 1980s and early 1990s.

In 1986 Tass was the second female director, after Gillian Armstrong in 1979, to win the AFI Award for Best Director (for Malcolm).

In 2024, Pure Luck was voted no. 2 in IGN's "Top 10 Buddy Cop Movies of All Time".

=== Personal awards ===
She has also been honoured with several personal awards, including:

- Film Victoria Screen Leader Award for Outstanding Leadership, Achievement and Service to the Screen Industry (2014)
- Byron Kennedy Award, with David Parker, "for their fiercely independent approach to filmmaking" (1986)
- Australian Hellenic Award for Excellence (1987)
- Hellenic Award for the Arts (1999)

=== Retrospectives ===
Tass has had the breadth of her film work presented internationally as retrospective events, including:

- American Cinematheque in Los Angeles (2012), which travelled across the US
- New Delhi, India (1997)
- Cape Town and Johannesburg, South Africa (1994)
- Moscow Film Festival, Russia (1990)
- Hawaii International Film Festival

== Filmography (as director) ==
=== Feature films ===
- Malcolm (1986)
- Rikky and Pete (1988)
- The Big Steal (1990)
- Pure Luck (1991)
- Stark (1993) (feature cut)
- Mr. Reliable (1996)
- Amy (1997)
- Samantha: An American Girl Holiday (2004)
- Felicity: An American Girl Adventure (2005)
- Matching Jack (2010)
- Fatal Honeymoon (2012)
- Lea to the Rescue (2016)
- Oleg: The Oleg Vidov Story (2021)

=== Films for television ===
- The Miracle Worker (2000)
- Child Star: The Shirley Temple Story (2001)
- Undercover Christmas (2003)
- Custody (2007)

=== Others ===
- Stark (TV miniseries 1993)
- Isolation Restaurant (short film, 2020)

== Theatre ==
Theatrical productions directed by Tass include:

- This Effing Lady by Maureen Sherlock (2021) AKA, Brunswick Ballroom
- Wicked Sisters by Alma De Groen (2020) Griffin Theatre Company
- Fern Hill by Michael Tucker for New Jersey Rep (2018 & 2019)
- Masterpieces of the Oral and Intangible Heritage of Humanity by Heather McDonald (2019) Signature Theatre
- Ear To The Edge Of Time by Alana Valentine (2018)
- Sex and Other Disturbances by Marisa Smith (2018) Portland Stage Company
- Sorting Out Rachel by David Williamson (2018) Ensemble Theatre, Sydney
- Uncle Vanya by Anton Chekhov, adapted by Annie Baker (2016) Red Stitch Actors Theatre
- e-baby by Jane Cafarella (2016) Ensemble Theatre
- Disgraced by Ayad Akhtar (2016) Melbourne Theatre Company
- Extinction by Hannie Rayson (2016) GPAC, Red Stitch Actors Theatre
- The Book Club by Roger Hall (2016) AKA, Melbourne & London productions
- The Flick by Annie Baker (2014) Red Stitch Actors Theatre
- The Other Place by Sharr White (2013) Melbourne Theatre Company
- Promises, Promises by Neil Simon (2012) The Production Company
