= Mr. Reliable =

- Directed by: Nadia Tass
- Written by: Don Catchlove; Terry Hayes
- Produced by: Jim McElroy
- Starring: Colin Friels
- Distributed by: PolyGram Filmed Entertainment
- Release dates: 22 November 1996 (UK); 30 January 1997 (Australia)
- Running time: 112 minutes
- Country: Australia
- Language: English
- Box office: $266,329 (Australia))

Mr. Reliable (also known as My Entire Life) is a 1996 film directed by Nadia Tass based on the true story of the Wally Mellish siege, starring Colin Friels and Jacqueline McKenzie. It is the second film to be inspired by Mellish's story, after 1993's Shotgun Wedding.

== Plot ==
In 1968, Wally Mellish has just been released from Long Bay Jail, moving into a new house in the Sydney suburb of Glenfield with his girlfriend, Beryl, and her baby. Police arrive at their door to question Mellish about some car thefts in the area, to which he responds by firing off a warning shot with his shotgun. A misunderstanding leads the police to believe that Beryl and the child are being held hostage. The matter quickly escalates to the Police Commissioner and the New South Wales Premier, then becomes a media circus. All are expecting an "American-style" siege situation, and the NSW Police are keen to publicly display their patience with Mellish having recently been accused of excessive force while handling protests against the Vietnam War.

Negotiations follow over the next eight days. He demands to be allowed to marry Beryl, and a prison chaplain is sent in alongside police to officiate a small ceremony inside the house. Meanwhile, a growing number of people gather outside Mellish's house in support as he becomes a folk hero in Australian culture. Eventually, the police offer him a deal in which he will come out and surrender with no charges laid, on condition that he publicly announces he will go and fight in Vietnam "to make up for the trouble (he's) caused." When it comes time to sign the enlistment papers, Mellish tells officials that he is illiterate. This lack of education disqualifies him from military service, and since the police agreed that charges would not be laid, he returns to his house in Glenfield to continue with his life.

== Cast ==
- Colin Friels as Wally Mellish
- Jacqueline McKenzie as Beryl Muddle
- Ken Radley as Mr. Morgan
- Amanda Muggleton as Mrs. Morgan
- Graham Rouse as Fred
- Jonathan Hardy as Reverend McIntyre
- Elaine Cusick as Mrs. McIntyre
- Frank Gallacher as Don Ferguson
- Paul Sonkkila as Norm Allan
- Susie Porter as Fay
- Gerry Skilton as Reggie Muddle
- Lisa Hensley as Penny Wilbeforce
- Barry Otto as The Premier
- Geoff Morrell as Sergeant Campbell
- Sam Atwell as Samuel Jakovitch
- Aaron Blabey as Bruce Morrison
- John Batchelor as Chubby Cop

== Production ==
Terry Hayes was attached to produce the film. He showed a script to Nadia Tass, who liked the story and the characters but wanted it rewritten. Hayes made the changes and Tass came on board to direct. Also released as My Entire Life.

== Differences with reality ==
In real life, Beryl sought to have the marriage annulled the day after the siege ended, declaring that Mellish had abused her and she had only agreed to it under duress. Some accounts also have it that Mellish actually did threaten to kill her and the child. Mellish denied these claims, later telling the Sydney Morning Herald "I swear on my kids' dying oath that the wedding was 100 per cent fact. I never did anything to her. She told the reporters that I chained her up and that. I never did. That part does hurt me. I'm against all that." Mellish was also not returned to his home in Glenfield but in fact sent to Morisset Hospital as a psychiatric patient. Upon release, NSW Police told him to leave the state - which he did, moving to Queensland, remarrying and living the rest of his life out under the alias "John Mellish."

== Release ==
The film opened in the UK on 22 November 1996. It opened in Australia on 30 January 1997 on 64 screens and grossed $139,939 in its opening week, placing 14th at the Australian box office. It went on to gross $266,329 in Australia.

== Reception ==
The independent critic Adrian Martin said of the film: "with its cute animal jokes, lovable ordinary folks and little-battler pathos, Mr Reliable is the kind of film today labelled Capraesque – except that Frank Capra never made a film as mushy or flabby as this."
