= North, South, East, West...Anthology =

Compilation album by Tim Finn
- Released: September 2009
- Genre: Pop
- Length: 126:04
- Label: Capitol

Tim Finn chronology
The Conversation (2008)	North, South, East, West...Anthology (2009)	The View Is Worth the Climb (2011)

North, South, East, West...Anthology is the first solo compilation album by New Zealand singer/songwriter Tim Finn. Released in September 2009, the two-disc collection features songs from Finn's solo career as well as his time with Split Enz, Crowded House and the Finn Brothers. The album reached #15 on the New Zealand music charts.

== Background ==
According to Finn, the idea of releasing a compilation album came from John O'Donnell, the head of EMI Australia at the time. "It was his baby. He likes my work and it was his suggestion that we create an anthology. I liked the idea that it would take from all parts, starting with Split Enz and I only realised after the title was chosen that there are four parts to my career: the Enz work and Crowded House, the Finn Brothers material and of course my solo work. So that's kind of neat, yeah, the musical north, south, east and west." Each of the two discs includes a new song, and several of the older songs were re-recorded for the album. Finn noted that the retrospective does not signal the end of his career, as he plans on releasing new material in the future.

== Critical reception ==
Professional ratings
Review scores
Source	Rating
Allmusic	4/5 stars
NZ Herald	4/5 stars

Russell Baillie of The New Zealand Herald wrote that some of the 1980s songs on the compilation have not aged well, but that the later material "holds up better." Baillie complimented "How Will You Go" amongst the revised songs, and said that the anthology "remains a fascinating map charting just how far this Finn has sailed."

Stephen Thomas Erlewine of Allmusic suggested that the album does not portray a completely accurate summary of Finn's career, as the combination of new songs and revisions ends up "downplaying the progressive pop of the '70s and the new wave leanings of the '80s." Still, Erlewine concluded, the compilation "does make a case that Finn has been consistently delivering fine songs for over 30 years." Graham Reid similarly noticed some unusual omissions from the Split Enz era.

== Track listing ==
All tracks are written by Tim Finn except where noted.

Disc one
No.	Title	Writer(s)	Original release	Length
1.	"I See Red" (Split Enz)		Frenzy (1979)	3:17
2.	"My Mistake" (Split Enz)	T. Finn; Eddie Rayner	Dizrythmia (1977)	3:02
3.	"Poor Boy" (Split Enz)		True Colours (1980)	3:23
4.	"Six Months in a Leaky Boat" (Split Enz)		Time and Tide (1982)	4:23
5.	"I Hope I Never" (Split Enz)		True Colours	4:36
6.	"Dirty Creature" (Split Enz)	T. Finn; Neil Finn; Nigel Griggs	Time and Tide	4:01
7.	"Maybe" (Split Enz)	T. Finn; Phil Judd	Mental Notes (1975)	2:53
8.	"Stuff and Nonsense" (Tim Finn and Missy Higgins)		Original by Split Enz on Frenzy	3:27
9.	"Fraction Too Much Friction"		Escapade (1983)	4:10
10.	"Made My Day"		Escapade	3:20
11.	"So Deep" (new version)	T. Finn; Jeremy Brock	Original on Big Canoe (1986)	4:15
12.	"How'm I Gonna Sleep"		Tim Finn (1989)	3:52
13.	"Not Even Close"		Tim Finn	4:17
14.	"Many's the Time"	T. Finn; Andy White; Liam Ó Maonlaí	Before & After (1993)	4:20
15.	"Persuasion"	T. Finn; Richard Thompson; Peter Filleul	Before & After	3:52
16.	"Into the Water"		Previously unreleased	3:14
17.	"Nothing Unusual"		Previously unreleased	4:02
Total length:				64:24

Disc two
No.	Title	Writer(s)	Original release	Length
1.	"Weather With You" (The Finn Brothers and Liam Finn)		Original by Crowded House on Woodface (1991)	3:42
2.	"How Will You Go" (new version)		Original by Crowded House on Woodface	2:59
3.	"It's Only Natural" (Tim Finn and Bic Runga)	T. Finn; N. Finn	Original by Crowded House on Woodface	3:44
4.	"Underwater Mountain"		Say It Is So (1999)	3:55
5.	"Dead Man"		Feeding the Gods (2001)	4:04
6.	"What You've Done"	T. Finn; White; Ó Maonlaí	Feeding the Gods	3:43
7.	"Subway Dreaming"		Feeding the Gods	4:16
8.	"Angels Heap" (The Finn Brothers)	T. Finn; N. Finn	Finn (1995)	2:50
9.	"Disembodied Voices" (The Finn Brothers)	T. Finn; N. Finn	Everyone Is Here (2005)	3:37
10.	"Luckiest Man Alive" (The Finn Brothers)	T. Finn; N. Finn	Everyone Is Here	3:59
11.	"Winter Light"		Imaginary Kingdom (2006)	4:10
12.	"Couldn't Be Done"		Imaginary Kingdom	2:53
13.	"Astounding Moon"		Imaginary Kingdom	3:36
14.	"Straw to Gold"		The Conversation (2008)	3:57
15.	"Out of This World"		The Conversation	3:01
16.	"The Saw and the Tree"		The Conversation	4:05
17.	"Light Years Away"	T. Finn; Dorothy Porter	Previously unreleased	3:09
Total length:				61:40

== Charts ==
Chart performance for North, South, East, West...Anthology
Chart (2009)	Peak position
Australian Albums (ARIA)	79
New Zealand Albums (RMNZ)	15
