= Acoustic Classics =

Studio album by Richard Thompson
- Released: 21 July 2014 (UK); 22 July 2014 (USA)
- Recorded: Rumiville Studio, Texas
- Genre: Folk rock
- Length: 56:34
- Labels: Beeswing, Proper
- Producer: Richard Thompson

Richard Thompson chronology
Electric (2012)	Acoustic Classics (2014)	Still (2015)

Acoustic Classics is the fifteenth solo studio album by British singer-songwriter Richard Thompson. It was released by Beeswing Records via Proper Records on 21 July 2014 in the UK and 22 July 2014 in the US.

== Background ==
Acoustic Classics is an album of acoustic versions of songs from Thompson's back catalogue, both as a solo artist and as part of the folk rock duo Richard & Linda Thompson.

Thompson states that the album "was conceived to be something to sell at acoustic shows" as he did not have anything available that was "representative of a solo show".

The album includes his first solo studio version of "Persuasion," which was previously available in a live recording and a studio duet with son Teddy Thompson. Thompson wrote the music with Peter Filleul for the Sweet Talker soundtrack; Tim Finn, formerly of Crowded House & Split Enz, later wrote lyrics for it. Finn had a minor hit (43 on UK chart) with the song when released as a solo single in 1993. The song was included on Finn's solo album Before & After, also released in 1993.

"From Galway to Graceland" is a song about an Irish woman who is convinced she is married to Elvis Presley and travels to Graceland to kneel by his grave before being ejected at closing time.

The album was released on CD and digital download.

== Equipment ==
According to the album credits, Thompson plays Lowden guitars on Acoustic Classics. An article in Acoustic quotes George Lowden as stating that Thompson has played such a guitar since the early 1980s and that he built a signature model for Thompson based on the Lowden F model guitar, with a cedar soundboard and ziricote wood for the back and sides and (as on most standard Lowden models) no position markers on the fingerboard.

== Critical reception ==
Professional ratings
Aggregate scores
Source	Rating
Metacritic	76/100
Review scores
Source	Rating
The Daily Telegraph	4.5/5 stars
PopMatters	7/10 stars
AllMusic	3.5/5 stars
The Guardian	4/5 stars
American Songwriter	3.5/5 stars
The Irish Times	4/5 stars
Financial Times	3/5 stars
Mojo	3/5 stars

On the Metacritic website, which aggregates reviews from critics and assigns a normalised rating out of 100, Acoustic Classics received a score of 76, based on 1 mixed and 9 positive reviews.

The album was widely reviewed, with critics giving mostly positive comments. Martin Chilton in The Daily Telegraph states that the album is "full of interesting guitar flourishes and rhythms which bring an imaginative touch to classics" and that "you will still find much to enjoy listening to a master re-touch some of his best works". John Paul of PopMatters writes that "Acoustic Classics serves as a fitting showcase for not only Thompson’s undeniable skills as a virtuoso guitarist, but also as a phenomenal songwriter capable of deftly tapping into a wealth of human emotions". He also states that the album "plays like an hour-long live performance stripped of crowd noise, giving it an intimate immediacy that draws in the listener and makes them feel as though this were a command performance for one". The Financial Times critic David Honigmann feels differently, writing in his review that "this attempt to capture the spirit of Thompson’s celebrated acoustic concerts is unexpectedly bloodless". Timothy Monger of AllMusic states that "it's a true pleasure to hear (Thompson's) effortless command of the instrument as well as his rich, commanding baritone in the warm, unplugged format" and feels Acoustic Classics is an essential album for Thompson fans and British folk fans in general". The Guardian review by Neil Spencer is more conservative, writing that "most of these pieces are best heard in original form" but does concede that "Thompson brings the experience of his years to bear on 14 dazzlingly good songs, singing more intensely while playing more nimbly". American Songwriter's Hal Horowitz writes that "these updated versions bring a newfound fire and/or subtlety" and comments that you can "relish these terrific songs played and sung by a master still at the top of his game and wise enough to realize he actually can improve on the originals." Joe Breen writing in The Irish Times writes that "there has always been a tension in Thompson's writing...here it sounds even starker in this solitary performance" and that "the "live" performance seems naked without applause". Colin Irwin writes in Mojo that these versions of the songs "are scarcely comparable to the original band versions...but there's a certain magic in hearing the classics in such intimate form". He summarises by stating that "the increasingly rugged, bluesy quality of Thompson's voice can be fully appreciated".

== Track listing ==
All tracks written by Richard Thompson except "Persuasion" by Thompson and Tim Finn

#	Title	Original version on	Length
1.	"I Want to See the Bright Lights Tonight"	I Want to See the Bright Lights Tonight (1974)	2:57
2.	"Walking on a Wire"	Shoot Out the Lights (1982)	3:53
3.	"Wall of Death"	Shoot Out the Lights	3:23
4.	"Down Where the Drunkards Roll"	I Want to See the Bright Lights Tonight	4:04
5.	"One Door Opens"	The Old Kit Bag (2003)	3:46
6.	"Persuasion"	debut solo studio recording, first studio version a duet with son Teddy on Action Packed (2001) and first live recording on Celtschmerz (1998)	3:54
7.	"1952 Vincent Black Lightning"	Rumor and Sigh (1991)	5:12
8.	"I Misunderstood"	Rumor and Sigh	3:57
9.	"From Galway to Graceland"	Watching the Dark (1993)	3:29
10.	"Valerie"	Daring Adventures (1986)	4:24
11.	"Shoot Out the Lights"	Shoot Out the Lights	4:16
12.	"Beeswing"	Mirror Blue (1994)	5:42
13.	"When the Spell is Broken"	Across a Crowded Room (1985)	4:19
14.	"Dimming of the Day"	Pour Down Like Silver (1975)	3:18

== Personnel ==
Richard Thompson - guitars and vocals

== Charts ==
Chart (2014)	Peak position
Belgian Albums (Ultratop Flanders)	42
Dutch Albums (Album Top 100)	93
New Zealand Albums (RMNZ)	32
Scottish Albums (Official Charts)	15
UK Albums (Official Charts)	16
UK Independent Albums (Official Charts)	2
US Billboard 200	103
US Americana/Folk Albums (Billboard)	3
US Independent Albums (Billboard)	21
US Top Rock Albums (Billboard)	34
US Indie Store Album Sales (Billboard)	11
