= Altitude (disambiguation) =

Altitude is the height of an object over a datum.

It may also refer to:

== Science and mathematics ==
- Altitude (astronomy), one of the angular coordinates of the horizontal coordinate system
- Altitude (triangle), in geometry, a line passing through one vertex of a triangle and perpendicular to the opposite side

== Music ==
- Altitude (ALT album), the collaborative album released by Andy White, Tim Finn and Liam O'Moanlai under the name ALT
- Altitude (Autumn album), the album by Dutch rockband Autumn
- Altitude (Yellow Second album), the album by pop punk band Yellow Second
- Altitude (Joe Morris album), the album by jazz guitarist Joe Morris

== Other uses ==
- Altitude (film), a 2010 Canadian horror film directed by Kaare Andrews
- Altitude, a 2017 dark comedy film starring Denise Richards
- Altitude (computer game), a 2D aerial combat game released in 2009
- Altitude (G.I. Joe), a fictional character in the G.I. Joe universe
- Altitude Sports and Entertainment, a regional sports network in Colorado

== See also ==
- Altitude Film Entertainment, a British film production and distribution company
- Major Altitude, a fictional character in the G.I. Joe universe
