= ALT (band) =

- Genres: Pop, rock
- Years active: 1994–1995
- Spinoff of: Hothouse Flowers
- Past members: Tim Finn; Andy White; Liam Ó Maonlaí

ALT was a one-off band, featuring former New Zealand band Split Enz frontman Tim Finn, Northern Irish singer/songwriter Andy White and the frontman of the Irish band Hothouse Flowers, Liam Ó Maonlaí, that recorded and played together in 1995.

The band's name was created out of the letters of their first names. They released two albums. The first was the studio album Altitude, was recorded in Periscope Studios in Melbourne, Australia. It had thirteen tracks, and it included references and influences to the musical and cultural traditions in which the participants grew up. The second was Bootleg, a live recording from The Continental in Sydney, Australia. Both albums were recorded and released in 1994–1995.

They toured briefly around Europe after the album was released. Finn re-recorded an ALT song as the title track and first song for his 2001 EP, What You've Done. The ALT version is the second track of that EP. Finn also included his new take on the song in the Feeding the Gods album the same year.

In 2004, Ó Maonlaí joined Finn on stage in Dublin, during a Finn Brothers concert, and they performed one of the ALT songs. The three have worked together on each other's solo projects from time to time.

The studio album was re-released in 2022 with five bonus tracks.

== Discography ==
List of albums, with Australian chart positions
Title	Album details	Peak chart positions	
Title	Album details	AUS	UK
Altitude	Released: 1995; Format: CD; Label: Capitol (832447-2)	80	67
