= What You've Done =

EP by Tim Finn
- Released: 8 April 2001
- Genre: Pop Music
- Length: 22:54
- Label: Periscope, EMI

Tim Finn chronology
Twinkle (1998)	What You've Done (2001)	Couldn't Be Done (2006)

Professional ratings
Review scores
Source	Rating
Allmusic	3/5 stars

What You've Done was a 2001 EP released by New Zealand singer/songwriter Tim Finn.

Referred to as a single in a lot of cases, it was released to support the album Feeding The Gods. It contains the ALT recording of What You've Done as well as the original track, and some supporting live tracks. In November 2001 the single peaked at No.48 on the New Zealand Singles Chart, and No.194 on the Australian Singles Chart.

== Track listing ==
- All songs composed by Tim Finn unless noted
1. "What You've Done" (album version) - Tim Finn, Andy White & Liam O'Moanlai
2. "What You've Done" (ALT version) - Tim Finn, Andy White & Liam O'Moanlai
3. "Persuasion" (Acoustic version) - Tim Finn, Richard Thompson
4. "Six Months in a Leaky Boat" (Live at the Borderline, London. 16 June 1993) - Tim Finn, Split Enz
5. "Charlie" (with Phil Manzanera)
6. "I See Red" (with Regurgitator)
7. "What You've Done" (video for use in computers) - Tim Finn, Andy White, Liam O'Moanlai
