= Say It Is So =

Studio album by Tim Finn
- Released: 1999
- Genre: Pop
- Length: 42:14
- Label: Sonny's Pop
- Producer: Jay Joyce

Tim Finn chronology
| Steel City (1998) | Say It Is So (1999) | Together in Concert: Live (2000) |

Singles from Say It Is So
- 1. "Twinkle" Released: 1999

Professional ratings
Review scores
| Source | Rating |
|---|---|
| Allmusic | 3.5/5 stars |
| EW | B+ |

Say It Is So is the fifth studio album by New Zealand singer/songwriter Tim Finn.

After the release of 1993's Before & After Finn was left without a record company. He met producer Jay Joyce in Nashville, in 1998 with whom he worked. No record company was interested in the album so he released it independently.

== Track listing ==
All tracks are written by Tim Finn, except where noted.

| No. | Title | Writer(s) | Length |
|---|---|---|---|
| 1. | "Underwater Mountain" | | 3:56 |
| 2. | "Shiver" | Finn; Marie Azcona | 4:21 |
| 3. | "Good Together" | Finn; Azcona | 3:15 |
| 4. | "Roadtrip" | Finn; Azcona | 3:25 |
| 5. | "Currents" | | 3:50 |
| 6. | "Need to Be Right" | | 4:32 |
| 7. | "Twinkle" | Finn; Azcona | 3:30 |
| 8. | "Big Wave Rider" | | 3:20 |
| 9. | "Death of a Popular Song" | | 4:23 |
| 10. | "Some Dumb Reason" | | 3:03 |
| 11. | "Rest" | Finn; George Upu; Traditional | 4:39 |
| Total length: | | | 42:14 |

In the track "Some Dumb Reason" there is the line "feeding the gods". This became the title of Finn's next album (and continues a long-standing continuity theme of Split Enz, Crowded House and Neil and Tim Finn albums using phrases from their other songs). In contrast, the album Feeding the Gods album also contained a song entitled "Say It Is So".

== Personnel ==
=== Musicians ===
- Tim Finn – vocals, piano, acoustic guitar
- Jay Joyce – guitars, keyboards, sounds, production
- Chris Feinstein – bass
- Ken Coomer – drums
- Julie Miller – backing vocals
- Bruce Bouton – pedal steel guitar
- Giles Reaves – drums (tracks 1, 2, 7, 11)
- Jackie Orszaczky – bass guitar and string arrangements (track 1)
- Laurence Maddy – guitar (track 2)
- Matt Johnson – drums (track 5)
- Kalai Lam – ukulele, log drum and nose flute (track 5)

=== Production ===
- Jay Joyce – production
- Rick Will – engineering
