= Frank Gibson Jr. =

New Zealand musician (1946–2025)

Frank Gibson Jr. (19 February 1946 – 21 May 2025) was a New Zealand jazz drummer and drum tutor. Gibson was the founder of Dr Tree and toured with stars such as Dionne Warwick, The Temptations and Glen Campbell before moving to the UK in 1977 where he became a highly sought-after session and studio musician, and toured with Dusty Springfield and Leo Sayer. Gibson returned to New Zealand, formed "Space Case", and produced three albums. Gibson performed at the 1990 Commonwealth Games opening ceremony. In 1992, he joined the Edith Cowan University as full-time lecturer in jazz music for five years. Gibson was the winner of the three New Zealand Best Jazz albums. In 1983, he was inducted into the Zildjian hall of fame.

== Career ==
=== New Zealand before 1977 ===
Before going to the UK in 1977, Gibson had formed Dr Tree, the first jazz fusion album in New Zealand, as well as working with The Neophonic Orchestra, and accompanying touring international stars such as Dionne Warwick, The Temptations and Glen Campbell.

=== United Kingdom career ===
As a highly sought-after session and studio musician, Gibson Jr. was active in the UK in the late 70s. As well as working with David Essex on a live BBC TV show for six weeks, he played and toured with Dusty Springfield.

Together with fellow New Zealand session musician, bassist Bruce Lynch, Gibson was an early member of Morrissey–Mullen, a pioneering jazz-fusion group which had a heavy schedule in London, which included a two-week residency at Ronnie Scott's alternating sets with Dizzy Gillespie. He also played straight-ahead jazz with Tony Lee, amongst others, before being "spotted" by Leo Sayer and joining him on a six-month world tour in 1978, and with whom he worked for three years.

Other recordings during that time include The Walker Brothers' Nite Flights, PAZ's "PAZ are Back", Ray Warleigh's Reverie (1977), with John Taylor on piano and Ron Mathewson on bass.

Gibson and Lynch recorded with Rick Wakeman on "Rhapsodies" produced by Tony Visconti, also performing at the Montreux Jazz Festival, Drury Lane and on a television special in Munich. He also recorded on a comeback album for Lonnie Donegan called Putting on the Style featuring Elton John, Brian May and Ray Cooper.

=== Return to New Zealand ===
Returning to New Zealand, Gibson formed "Space Case", the first New Zealand jazz-funk band, producing three albums and performing regularly. In 1992 Gibson joined the Western Australia Academy of Performing Arts at the Edith Cowan University, as full-time lecturer in jazz music for five years.

In New Zealand those he recorded with include Alan Broadbent, John Hanlon, Malcolm McNeill, and Joy Yates & Dave MacRae. His album with Mike Nock, Open Door, won the 1987 Best Jazz Album in New Zealand in 1987, Gibson's second such award (of three). He played live at the 1990 Commonwealth Games opening ceremony.

In 2007, he led a quartet with which features Matt Clohesy on bass, Sam Keevers on piano, and Jamie Oehlers on tenor sax.

Gibson died in Auckland on 21 May 2025, at the age of 79.

== Awards ==
Gibson won three Best Jazz Album awards including one for Open Door.

Gibson was inducted into the Zildjian hall of fame in 1983. In 2013, he was presented with a VAC Scroll of Honour by the Variety Artists Club of New Zealand for his contribution to the New Zealand entertainment industry.

== Discography ==
=== As leader/co-leader ===
- Doctor Tree Frank Gibson's Doctor Tree (EMI NZ)
- Spreading the Word Frank Gibson's Jazzmobile (Kiwi Pacific Records NZ)
- Parallel 37 (1982) Frank Gibson with Milt Jackson, John Scofield, Bobby Shew, Steve Erquiaga and Mike Nock – Jazz Record of the Year
- Open Door (1987) Frank Gibson and Mike Nock – Jazz Record of the Year
- Executive Decision' Frank Gibson's Space Case (Ode Records NZ)
- Space Case 11 Frank Gibson's Space Case featuring Claudio Roditi and Ron McClure (Ode Records NZ)
- Space Case 111 Frank Gibson's Space Case (Ode Records NZ)
- Rainbow Bridge Frank Gibson Quartet (2003)
- Together Again Broadbent, Gibson and Smith (2009) Ode Records

=== As sideman ===
- Reverie, Ray Warleigh 1977
- Something Else, Graham Dee (Pye, London)
- Puttin' on the Style, Lonnie Donegan (Chrysalis)
- Nite Flights, The Walker Brothers (GTO)
- Half Brother, (Arola Hansa)
- Rhapsodies, Rick Wakeman (A&M)
- Southern Excursion, Brian Smith
- Genre, Shona Laing 1985
- The Masquerade is Over, Jacqui Fitzgerald
- Should I Be Good, Should I Be Evil, Hammond Gamble 1985
- Iris, Phil Broadhurst
- The Song of Crazy Horse, J.D. Blackfoot (Pye)
- Song of Home, Alan Broadbent Trio 1986 (Kiwi Pacific)
- Everything I Love, Alan Broadbent Trio 1987 (Trend Discovery)
- Further Down the Road, Alan Broadbent Trio 1987 (Kiwi Pacific)
- Away from You, Alan Broadbent Trio 1989 (Trend Discovery)
- Over the Fence, Alan Broadbent Trio 1989 (Ode)
- Another Time, Alan Broadbent Trio 1990 (Trend Discovery)
- Fine and Dandy, George Chisholm (Ode)
- Detour Ahead, Garry Lee, June Newman, John Green (1994)
- Pacific Standard Time, Alan Broadbent Trio, (Concord) 1995
- Suzanne, Suzanne Lynch (EMI)
- X, Tina Cross (Pagan)
- Strut, Jamie Oehlers (Request) 1998
- Passion, Julie Mason (Vox), 1998
- Tasman Connection, Don Burrows (Cherry Pie)
- Waiting for You, Murray McNabb (Ode)
- Paz are Back, (Spotlite)
- Resolution, George Chisholm (Ode)
- Auckland Jazz Ensemble, George Chisholm (Ode)
- Rendevouis Brian Smith (Ode)
- Twelve O'Clock Tales Julie Mason (Vox), 2002
- Jazz meets Symphony Alan Broadbent Trio with Tierney Sutton (2003)
- The Road Ahead Phil Broadhurst (Vox, 2003)
- Estate (Summer) Julie Mason 2005
- Dan Papirany Trio – Live at MLC vol 1 (2005)
