= Miles Golding =

Classical violinist

Miles Golding (born in Sydney in 1951) is a classical violinist, and an original member of Split Enz. Golding played on the band's first single "For You" in 1973, leaving them shortly after to pursue further training in London.

Golding has played a variety of London in the Royal Philharmonic Orchestra, BBC Symphony Orchestra, City of London Sinfonia, Academy of St Martin in the Fields, Philomusica, the London Sinfonietta, Kent Opera, and the Orchestra of St John's Smith Square.

After a reunion with Tim Finn, Golding travelled to New Zealand in 2007 and 2008 to play violin on Finn's album The Conversation.
