= Suffer Never (song) =

Single by Finn Brothers

from the album Finn
- Released: 1995
- Recorded: York St. Studios, Auckland
- Genre: Rock, Lo-fi
- Label: Parlophone
- Songwriter(s): Neil Finn, Tim Finn
- Producer(s): Tchad Blake

Finn Brothers singles chronology
"Suffer Never" (1995)	"Angels Heap" (1995)

"Suffer Never" is a song by Tim Finn and Neil Finn during their partnership as Finn. It was first released in 1995 on their debut album Finn. It reached #29 on the UK Singles Chart, and #70 in Australia. Lead vocals for the song were performed by Neil.

== Personnel ==
- Neil Finn – lead vocals, guitar, bass
- Tim Finn – keyboard, drums, backing vocals

== Charts ==
Chart (1995)	Peak position
Australia (ARIA)	70
UK (Official Charts Company)	29
