= 2005 New Zealand Music Awards =

Annual New Zealand music awards ceremony

- Awarded for: Excellence in New Zealand music
- Date: 5 October 2005
- Location: Aotea Centre, Auckland
- Country: New Zealand
- Reward: Tui award trophy
- Website: nzmusicawards.co.nz

Television/radio coverage
- Network: C4

The 2005 New Zealand Music Awards took place on 5 October 2005 at the Aotea Centre in Auckland.

== Awards and nominees ==
The 'Lifetime Achievement Award' category was changed to 'Outstanding Contribution to the Growth in NZ Music on Radio'.

One new category was added: 'Best Roots Album'.

The Best Maori Album and Best Gospel / Christian Album categories were not awarded due to insufficient entries.

Winners are listed first and highlighted in boldface.

Multiple winners on the night included Fat Freddy's Drop with five awards.

Key
† – Non-technical award
‡ – Technical award

Album of the Year†	Single of the Year†
**Fat Freddy's Drop – Based on a True Story**; Breaks Co-Op – The Sound Inside; Finn Brothers – Everyone Is Here; Shihad – Love Is The New Hate; The Phoenix Foundation – Pegasus	**Breaks Co-Op – "The Otherside"**; Brooke Fraser – "Arithmetic"; Dave Dobbyn – "Welcome Home"; Finn Brothers – "Won't Give In"; P-Money – "Stop The Music"
Best Group†	Best Male Solo Artist†
**Fat Freddy's Drop – Based on a True Story**; Goldenhorse – Out of the Moon; Shihad – Love Is The New Hate	**P-Money – Magic City**; Savage – Moonshine; SJD – Southern Lights
Best Female Solo Artist†	Breakthrough Artist of the Year†
**Yulia – Into the West**; Debbie Harwood – Soothe Me; Jordan Reyne – Passenger	**The Checks – What You Heard**; Dei Hamo – First Edition; Tha Feelstyle – Break It to Pieces
Highest Selling NZ Album†	Highest Selling NZ Single†
Yulia – Into the West	Dei Hamo – We Gon Ride
Songwriter of the Year†	Best Rock Album†
**Dave Dobbyn – "Welcome Home"**; Andy Lovegrove, Zane Lowe & Hamish Clark – "The Other Side" (Breaks Co-Op); Brooke Fraser – "Arithmetic"	**Shihad – Love is the New Hate**; Pluto – Pipeline Under The Ocean; The D4 – Out of My Head
Best Urban / Hip Hop Album†	Best Dance / Electronica Album†
**P-Money – Magic City**; Savage – Moonshine; Tha Feelstyle – Break It To Pieces	**Del Rey System – Del Rey System**; Audiosauce – Contimental Drift; Baitercell & Schumacher – The Wall of Bass Technique; Mark de Clive-Lowe – Tide's Arising
Best Aotearoa Roots Album†	Best Music Video†
**Fat Freddy's Drop – Based on a True Story**; Katchafire – Slow Burning; TrinityRoots – Home, Land & Sea	**Chris Graham & Dei Hamo – "We Gon Ride"**; Greg Page & P-Money – "Stop The Music"; Reuben Sutherland & The Phoenix Foundation – "Hitchcock"
Peoples Choice Award†	Best Producer‡
**Fat Freddy's Drop – Based on a True Story**; P-Money; Savage; Shihad; the feelers	**Angus Mcnaughton & Sean Donnelly – Southern Lights (SJD)**; Lee Prebble – Pegasus (The Phoenix Foundation); Nick Abbott, Luke Tomes & Pluto – Pipeline Under The Ocean (Pluto)
Best Engineer‡	Best Album Cover‡
**Angus Mcnaughton – Southern Lights (SJD)**; Doug Jane – Into The West (Yulia); Nick Abbott & Luke Tomes – Pipeline Under The Ocean (Pluto)	**K. Futialo, A. Morton, G. Osborne & A. B. White – Break It To Pieces (Tha Feelstyle)**; Chris Brunskill – Slow Burning (Katchafire); Tana Mitchell – Contimental Drift (Audiosauce)
Best Classical Album†	Best Maori Album†
**Dan Poynton – The Complete Piano Music of Douglas Lilburn, Volume 1**; **Best Classical Album: Jonathan Lemalu – Opera Arias**; Tower New Zealand Youth Choir – Gaude/Rejoice	no award
Best Gospel / Christian Album†	Best Country Music Album†
no award	**Kylie Harris – Kylie Harris**; Noel Burns – Special To Me; Pat Hannah – Moods & Memories
Best Folk Album†	Best Pacific Music Album†
**Bob McNeill – Turn The Diesels**; John Sutherland – Mealmarket St; Hinemoana Baker – puawai	**Ardijah – Journey**; Aniseto Falemoe – Afe O Maila Ole Alofa; Ephraim – Moemoea o Avaiki
Best Jazz Album†	International Achievement Award†
**The Kevin Clark Trio Live with Guest Artists – The Sandbar Sessions**; Dan Papirany Trio – Session One; Julie Mason Quintet – Estate (Summer)	**Evermore**; **Scribe**; **Finn Brothers – Everyone Is Here**
Outstanding Contribution to the Growth of NZ Music on Radio†
**Camille Guzzwell, David Ridler**
