= Nerd Prom =

Nerd Prom may refer to:

- San Diego Comic-Con, a comic book convention and multi-genre entertainment event
- The White House Correspondents' Dinner, an annual dinner involving major political and media figures
  - Nerd Prom: Inside Washington's Wildest Week, a 2015 American documentary about the dinner
- The American Society of Hematology Annual Meeting, a yearly conference of blood doctors from around the world
