= Sweet Talker (soundtrack) =

Soundtrack album by Richard Thompson
- Released: 1991
- Recorded: 1990
- Studio: Angel Recording Studios and Redwood Studios, London; Ground Control Studios, Santa Monica, California
- Genre: Rock
- Label: Capitol
- Producer: Peter Filleul, Richard Thompson

Richard Thompson chronology
Amnesia (1988)	Sweet Talker (1991)	Rumor and Sigh (1991)

Professional ratings
Review scores
Source	Rating
AllMusic	2/5 stars
Encyclopedia of Popular Music	2/5 stars

Sweet Talker is a soundtrack album by Richard Thompson released in 1991. It is the soundtrack for the Australian film of the same name.

Thompson had worked with composer Peter Filleul on various other soundtrack projects, notably the TV shows The Life and Loves of a She-Devil and The Marksman. In 1990 film producer Taylor Hackford made the movie Sweet Talker which starred and was written by Bryan Brown. Hackford invited Thompson to submit some ideas for a soundtrack and then asked him to work with Filleul to produce a full soundtrack for the film.

The project was a difficult one, with work having to be revisited as Hackford edited and re-edited the film. At its conclusion, Thompson swore that he would never do another soundtrack.

The film was not a success. Thompson's score did little to enhance his reputation, although the instrumental "Persuasion" was subsequently re-written with lyrics by Tim Finn and released as a single in 1993.

== Track listing ==
All songs written by Richard Thompson except where noted.

1. "Put Your Trust In Me"
2. "Persuasion" (Peter Filleul, Richard Thompson)
3. "Roll Up"
4. "The Dune Ship"
5. "Conviction" (Peter Filleul, Richard Thompson)
6. "Boomtown"
7. "Harry's Theme"
8. "Sweet Talker"
9. "To Hang A Dream On
10. "Beachport"
11. "False Or True" (Peter Filleul, Richard Thompson)

== Personnel ==
- Richard Thompson - guitar, vocals, mandolin, banjo
- Peter Filleul - keyboards, backing vocals
- Simon Nicol - guitar
- David Paton - bass guitar
- Dave Mattacks - drums
- Pete Zorn - whistle, percussion, saxophone, bass flute, piccolo
- Liz Kitchen - percussion, celeste
- Christine Collister - backing vocals
- Richard Brunton - guitar, pedal steel guitar
- Bob Jenkins - drums
- Danny Thompson - double bass
- Ian Lynn - keyboards
- Steve Ashley - harmonica
- John Kirkpatrick - accordion
- Chris Leslie - fiddle
- Leuan Jones - harp
- Fran Byrne - bodhran
- John Andrew Parks - vocals
- Richard Bennet - French horn
