= Steel City (album) =

Soundtrack album by Tim Finn
- Released: 1998
- Recorded: 1997
- Studios: Sun Studios (Sydney); Sunshine Studios (Brisbane)
- Length: 60:42
- Label: Columbia/Sony
- Producers: Tim Finn; Greg Wales; Greg Hitchcock; Peter Contini; Robert Moore

Tim Finn chronology
Before & After (1993)	Steel City (1998)	Say It Is So (1999)

Singles from Steel City
- 1. "Steel City" Released: 1997

Steel City or Dein Perry's Steel City is a soundtrack by New Zealand-born artist Tim Finn which was released in 1998 on Columbia Records/Sony Records. Finn has been a member of Split Enz, Crowded House and Finn Brothers.

The soundtrack, was used for Steel City, Sydney Theatre Company's tap dance production, created by Australian choreographer, Dein Perry, with all tracks written or co-written by Finn. Finn co-wrote "Drop Out" and "Road Trip" with Marie Azcona, his wife; he co-wrote "Where I Live" with Mike Chunn, a former Split Enz bandmate. For the work Finn used the Steel City Band and additional musicians.

The show's run premiered on 3 January 1998 at Sydney Casino's Star City Showroom with Finn as music director. Mark Woods of Variety described Finn's score, "while live, thunderously loud rock music, composed by [Finn ...] gives the action some punch, it often threatens to overpower parts of the show and frequently necessitates straining to hear the tapping."

== Track listing ==
All tracks are written by Tim Finn, unless noted

No.	Title	Length
1.	"Steel City"	3:16
2.	"Overture"	2:20
3.	"Truss Dance"	5:43
4.	"Spirit Level"	2:54
5.	"Old Car"	3:40
6.	"Drop Out" (Finn, Marie Azcona)	4:57
7.	"Walking"	3:57
8.	"Smoko Duet"	3:14
9.	"Rock & Roll Girl"	3:05
10.	"Absail"	3:23
11.	"Forklifts"	3:26
12.	"Where I Live" (Finn, Mike Chunn)	3:50
13.	"New Car"	4:53
14.	"Road Trip" (Finn, Azcona)	2:53
15.	"Finale"	5:46
16.	"Glide"	3:18

== Personnel ==
Steel City Band

- Joe Acaria: – drums
- Dario Bortolin: – bass guitar (except tracks 4, 16)
- Tim Finn: – acoustic guitar (tracks 6, 14), guitar (4, 16), keyboards (4, 14, 16), piano (tracks 4, 16), vocals (4, 6, 14, 16)
- Greg Hitchcock: – guitar, bass guitar (tracks 4, 16)
- Laurence Maddy: – Hammond organ, trombone, guitar, sound effects

Additional musicians

- Ben Ely: – bass guitar and dulcimer (track 6)
- Jodi Phillis: – backing vocals (track 14)
- Greg Wales: – drums (tracks 4, 16)

Recording details

- Studio: – Sun Studios, Sydney (except tracks 6, 14), Sunshine Studios, Brisbane (tracks 6, 14)
- Producer: – Tim Finn; Greg Wales, Finn and Greg Hitchcock (tracks 4, 16); Finn, Peter Contini and Hitchcock (track 1); Finn and Contini (tracks 9, 12), Robert Moore (tracks 6, 14)
- Engineer, mixer: – Peter Contini (except tracks 6, 14); Joe Malone (tracks 6, 14); Greg Wales (tracks 4, 16)
  - Additional engineering, mixer: – Peter Continin (tracks 6, 14)
- Mastering: – Tony Learmont

== Notes ==
A reworked version of "Road Trip" appears on Tim Finn's 1999 solo album Say It Is So.
