= Nerd Prom: Inside Washington's Wildest Week =

- Directed by: Patrick Gavin
- Written by: Patrick Gavin
- Produced by: Vincent Vittorio
- Starring: Tucker Carlson, Ann Compton, Steve Thomma, Ken Day, April Ryan, Julie Mason, Suzy Jacobs, Roland Martin, Steve Scully, Nikki Schwab, Grover Norquist, Bret Baier
- Edited by: Christopher Brannan
- Music by: Scott Hampton
- Distributed by: Life is My Movie Entertainment
- Release date: April 11, 2015
- Running time: 80 minutes
- Country: United States
- Language: English

Nerd Prom: Inside Washington's Wildest Week is a 2015 documentary film produced by Life Is My Movie Entertainment. The film follows ex Politico reporter Patrick Gavin and presents the modern White House Correspondents Dinner as an event that has lost sight of its original purpose.

== Synopsis ==
The White House Correspondents’ Association's annual dinner, which began in 1921, was originally a one-night occasion to honor the important work of White House correspondents and to allow reporters and politicians to briefly put down their guards and get to know each other better. Another key component of the dinner is to raise scholarship funds for future journalists. Patrick Gavin, ex Politico reporter and Director of “Nerd Prom,” claims that the event has lost sight of those original intentions, and only donates a small fraction of the event's proceeds to those promised scholarships. Gavin argues that the event and its attendees are now more focused on the celebrity turnout and the week long schedule of partying that take place before the actual dinner.

“Nerd Prom” premiered on April 11, 2015 in Washington D.C. two weeks before the Presidential Correspondents’ Dinner.

== See also ==
- White House Correspondents' Association
- White House press corps
- Journalism
- Not the White House Correspondents’ Dinner
