= No Thunder, No Fire, No Rain =

1986 single by Tim Finn

Single by Tim Finn

from the album Big Canoe
- B-side: "Searching the Streets"
- Released: April 1986
- Length: 4:03 (single version); 5:18 (album version)
- Label: Virgin Records
- Songwriters: Tim Finn, Jeremy Brock
- Producer: Nick Launay

Tim Finn singles chronology
| "Home for My Heart" (1985) | "No Thunder, No Fire, No Rain" (1986) | "Spiritual Hunger" (1986) |

"No Thunder, No Fire, No Rain" is a song by New Zealand musician, Tim Finn, released in April 1986 as the lead single from his second studio album, Big Canoe. The song reached number 24 on the New Zealand charts and number 46 in Australia.

The lyrics refer to the event of the 1984 Bhopal disaster.

Two different music videos were released for the song: one depicting the events outlined in the lyrics, intercut with scenes of Finn singing the song; the other depicted Finn simply singing the song intercut with street scenes, and was shot in black and white.

== Track listing ==
Australian/New Zealand 7" single (VS 849)

- A. "No Thunder, No Fire, No Rain" - 4:03
- B. "Searching the Streets" - 4:02

Australian/New Zealand 12" single (VS 849)

- A1. "No Thunder, No Fire, No Rain" (Extended Mix)
- B1. "No Thunder, No Fire, No Rain" (7" Version)
- B2. "Searching the Streets"

== Charts ==
| Chart (1986) | Peak position |
|---|---|
| Australia (Kent Music Report) | 46 |
| New Zealand (Recorded Music NZ) | 24 |
