= Dan Papirany =

Israeli musical artist

Dan Papirany דן פפירני
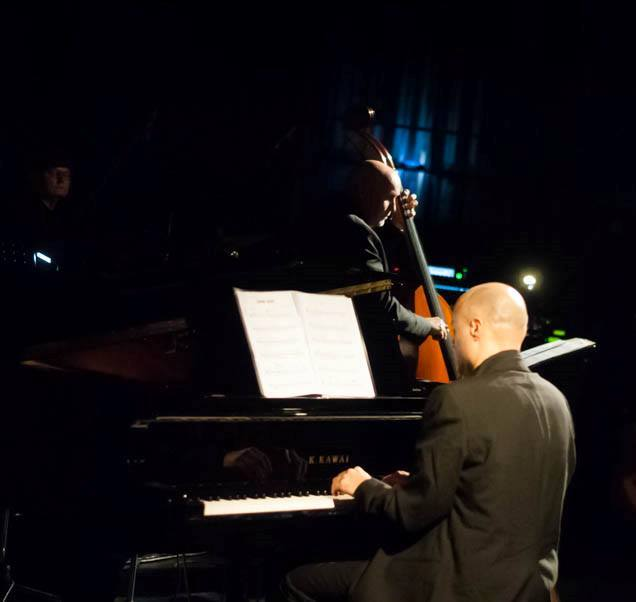
- Dan Papirany Trio in Bucharest, Romania. (From left): Wright, McGregor, Papirany

Background information
- Born: March 7, 1967 (age 59); Israel
- Origin: Wellington, New Zealand
- Genres: Jazz
- Occupations: Musician, teacher
- Instruments: Piano, drums, bass guitar
- Years active: 1995–present
- Label: Ode
- Member of: Dan Papirany Trio
- Website: danpapirany.com

Dan Papirany (Hebrew: דן פפירני; born March 7, 1967) is an Israeli-born jazz pianist, drummer, composer and music teacher. He works solo, in duos or as leader of his own trio. Papirany started performing in Wellington, New Zealand in 1995 and has been based in Queensland, Australia since 2011.

== Biography ==
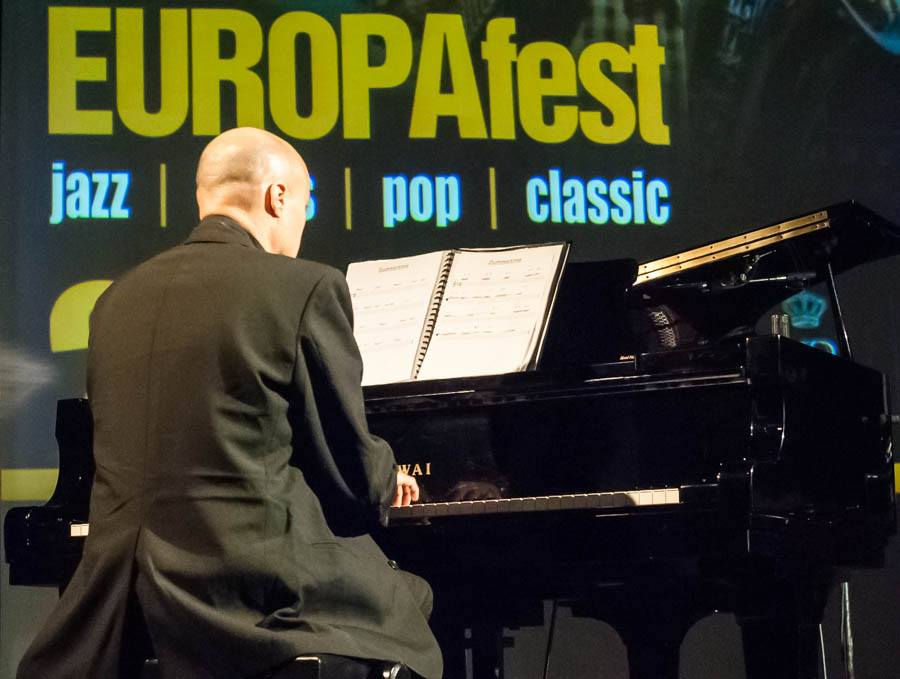
Dan Papirany, Photo by Camelia Şirli

Dan Papirany was born on March 7, 1967, in Israel and lived in Tel Aviv. During his teens he was inspired by Phil Collins' work in the jazz fusion group, Brand X and took drum lessons.

In 1995, while a post-graduate student at Massey University in Wellington, Papirany, on piano, formed a jazz trio, which played in local venues such as Bar Bodega. He had studied drums for two years but switched to piano, he also became a secondary school music teacher. In 2002 Papirany relocated to Auckland and established another trio with Pete McGregor on bass guitar and Owen Kneebone on drums. The trio recorded their first album, Session One, on March 2, 2004, at GT Studios, Auckland, which was released later that year. It comprises standard jazz tunes and was nominated for Jazz Album of the Year at the 2005 New Zealand Music Awards

The trio's second album, Session Two – Originals (or Originals. Vol. 1), recorded by the same line-up at the same studio, on April 27, 2004; comprises original tunes only. Papirany wrote all ten tracks. The third, fourth and fifth albums are live albums recorded by the line-up of Papirany, McGregor and Frank Gibson Jr. on drums at their residency venue, MLC Café & Bar, Auckland. The next three albums were credited to Papirany, 2011, 2014 (includes the original track, "Bargara") and 2015 (includes original track, "E♭ Major Waltz").

Since 2014 Papirany has collaborated with Norwegian-born jazz singer, Vibeke Voller, as a vocal duo based in Queensland. They have issued three albums, Don't Go to Strangers (2015), I Took a Chance (2017) and Night and Day (2019). Papirany recorded his debut solo album in 2017 in Israel.

The next trio album, 2018, was recorded in Queensland, featuring a live session which has a raw sound employing minimal separation and mixing process. In May 2016 Papirany and his trio performed two shows at EUROPAfest in Bucharest, Romania. He undertook two solo shows in 2018, and two shows with his trio at EUROPAfest 2019, Papirany was on the judging panel in the 2017, 2018 and 2019 Bucharest international jazz competitions. As from 2018, Papirany lives in Bundaberg.

== Discography ==
Credits:

=== Solo ===
- 2011 (November 1, 2011)
- 2014 (April 16, 2014)
- 2015 (April 7, 2015)
- Solo (May 31, 2017)
- Solo 2 (May 1, 2020)
- I Trio (June 18, 2022)

=== Dan Papirany Trio ===
Dan Papirany interview on Concert FM talking about the album "Session one - December 9th 2004"

Autumn Leaves by Dan Papirany trio found on the album MLC VOL 1

- Session One (2004) – Ode Records
- Session Two – Originals or Originals. Vol. 1 (2004) – Ode Records
- Live at MLC vol 1 (live album, October 14, 2005)
- Live at MLC vol 2 (live album, July 29, 2009)
- Live at MLC vol 3 (live album, 2011)
- 2018 (December 24, 2018)
- Live in Bucharest (Europafest 2019) (live album, June 7, 2019)

=== Vibeke Voller and Dan Papirany ===
- Don't Go to Strangers (September 27, 2015)
- I Took a Chance (July 8, 2017) – Newmarket Music
- Night and Day (December 1, 2019)
