= The View Is Worth the Climb =

Studio album by Tim Finn
- Released: 6 August 2011
- Length: 42:07
- Labels: ABC Records; Universal Records
- Producers: Tim Finn; Jacquire King

Tim Finn chronology
North, South, East, West...Anthology (2009)	The View Is Worth the Climb (2011)	Caught by the Heart (2021)

The View Is Worth the Climb is the ninth studio album by New Zealand singer/songwriter Tim Finn, released in August 2011. The album peaked at number 28 in New Zealand.

The title track was co-written by Finn with Australian singer-songwriter Megan Washington. Three other tracks are co-written by Finn and his wife Marie Azcona.

The album was recorded in twelve working days in late 2010 at Roundhead Studios in Auckland, New Zealand.

The song "Wild Sweet Children" features Finn's children Harper and Elliot Finn on backing vocals.

== Track listing ==
No.	Title	Length
1.	"The Everyday"	3:16
2.	"The View Is Worth the Climb"	3:50
3.	"Going Going Gone"	3:52
4.	"All This and More"	4:02
5.	"Wild Sweet Children"	4:16
6.	"Everybody's Wrong"	3:18
7.	"Can't Be Found"	3:42
8.	"Opposite Sign"	4:10
9.	"People Like Us"	4:09
10.	"Certain Way"	3:41
11.	"Keep Talking"	3:51

== Personnel ==
- Tim Finn – vocals, acoustic guitar, banana drum
- Brett Adams – electric guitar
- Joey Waronker – drums
- Zac Rae – keyboards
- Tony Buchen – bass
- Mara TK
- Harper Finn – vocals
- Eliot Finn – vocals

== Charts ==
Chart (2011)	Peak position
New Zealand Albums (RMNZ)	27
