= Altitude (ALT album) =

Studio album by ALT
- Released: 1995
- Recorded: July 1994; Periscope Studios, Melbourne
- Genre: Folk rock
- Length: 55:43
- Label: ALT/Cooking Vinyl
- Producer: ALT

Professional ratings
Review scores
Source	Rating
AllMusic	4.5/5 stars

Altitude was the only studio album to date released by ALT, the grouping of Tim Finn, Andy White & Liam O'Moanlai. Also released was a live recording simply called Bootleg.

== Track listing ==
All tracks are written by Tim Finn, Andy White & Liam O'Moanlai unless noted

No.	Title	Length
1.	"We're All Men"
2.	"Penelope Tree"
3.	"When The Winter Comes"
4.	"Favourite Girl"
5.	"Swim"
6.	"The Refuge Tree"
7.	"What You've Done"
8.	"Second Swim"
9.	"Girlfriend Guru" (ALT, Laurence Maddy, Simon Polinski)
10.	"Mandala"
11.	"I Decided To Fly"
12.	"The Day You Were Born"
13.	"Halfway Around The World"

== Charts ==
Chart (1995)	Peak position
Australian Albums (ARIA Charts)	80
