= The Conversation (Tim Finn album) =

Studio album by Tim Finn
- Released: 24 November 2008
- Genre: Acoustic; chamber music
- Length: 43:48
- Label: Capitol
- Producer: Ethan Allen and Eddie Rayner

Tim Finn chronology
Imaginary Kingdom (2006)	The Conversation (2008)	North, South, East, West...Anthology (2009)

Professional ratings
Review scores
Source	Rating
Allmusic	4/5 stars

The Conversation is the eighth studio album by New Zealand singer/songwriter Tim Finn. It was recorded in April and May 2008, and released in New Zealand on 24 November 2008. The album features collaborations with former Split Enz members Eddie Rayner and Miles Golding, along with Tim's guitarist Brett Adams. The album's working title was Echo Chamber. The album is produced by Ethan Allen, known for his work with famed producer Daniel Lanois. Capitol/EMI released a run of The Conversation CDs with a back cover that incorrectly notes the copyright year as 2006. The album was recorded and released in 2008.

The track "More Fool Me" quotes from the early Split Enz song "Matinee Idyll (129)", and the song "Imaginary Kingdom" shares its name with Finn's previous solo album.

== Track listing ==
All tracks are written by Tim Finn

No.	Title	Length
1.	"Straw to Gold"	3:57
2.	"Out of This World"	3:01
3.	"The Saw and the Tree"	4:04
4.	"Slow Mystery"	4:00
5.	"Rear View Mirror"	3:43
6.	"Only a Dream"	2:30
7.	"Fall from Grace"	2:42
8.	"Invisible"	3:51
9.	"Snowbound"	2:57
10.	"Great Return"	3:02
11.	"Imaginary Kingdom"	3:17
12.	"Forever Thursday"	2:57
13.	"More Fool Me"	3:41
14.	"False Hope" (iTunes bonus track)

== Personnel ==
- Tim Finn - vocals, acoustic guitar, banana drum
- Eddie Rayner - piano, organ, keys
- Brett Adams - electric guitar
- Miles Golding - violin
