= J. D. Blackfoot =

American musician

J.D. Blackfoot
- Born: 9 May 1944, Cleveland, Ohio, United States
- Genres: Rock
- Occupation: Musician
- Instrument(s): Vocals, guitar
- Years active: 1970–present
- Labels: Philips, Mercury, Pye, Fantasy, Family, Sisapa Record Co., Yonder Music
- Website: https://jdblackfoot.com/

J. D. Blackfoot is a rock musician from Ohio, United States who has been recording since the early 1970s. Along with a couple of hit singles, he won an award for his album The Song of Crazy Horse.

== Background ==
The name J. D. Blackfoot applies to both the singer and the group. Blackfoot was born Benjamin Franklin Van Dervort. Before he made his way in music, he worked in various occupations which included pest extermination, insurance sales and also as a driver. In relation to possible confusion about his ethnicity, Blackfoot is not Native American. He is a convert to their plight as a result of discovering it in books while in his 20s.

== Career ==
=== 1960s to 1990s ===
Early in his career Blackfoot went by the name Benny Van and fronted The Ebb Tides, an Ohio band formed in 1963. For a period of time, around 1967 to 1968, the band became known as Tree. In 1969, he reformed the band around his name and the single "Who's Nuts Alfred" was released. The single was backed with "Epitaph For A Head" and had its release in the US in 1969 on Philips 40625.

In 1970, his album The Ultimate Prophecy was released on Mercury SR 61288. It contained the songs "One Time Woman" and "Angel". It was also released in twenty countries.

With his album behind him and a couple of hits, he headed to New Zealand. In 1972, he arrived there with his wife. Whilst employed by Pye, he got the director Tim Murdoch to allow him to record an album The Song of Crazy Horse. The title track, which ran for 18 minutes, was played extensively on KSHE St. Louis, KADI St. Louis, and KWK St. Louis. It was recorded at Stebbing Studio in Auckland. Musicians who played on the album were Frank Gibson Jr. on drums, Billy Kristian on bass, Mike Walker on piano, Bob Jackson on guitar and Jimmy Sloggett on saxophone. Tony Baker produced the album as well as handling the conducting chores. Producer Baker also contributed saxophone and organ. The album became the Album of the Year, picking up 1974 RATA award.

=== 2000s ===
In the early 2000s Blackfoot returned to New Zealand and while there he recorded the Co-Dependent Dysfunctional You double album. Around the mid-2000s he was still performing throughout the Midwest.

In 2007 The Ultimate Prophecy was re-released.

In October, 2016 he was inducted into the “St. Louis Classic Rock Hall of Fame. Even though he was from Columbus, Ohio, the category he was inducted in was the "Outside Influence" category for those who have had a great influence on the St. Louis music market. After 50 years of performing, he was calling time on performing live. The JD Blackfoot Farewell Concert was announced for May 20, 2017 at the Touhill Anheuser-Busch Performance Hall. Also in 2017, the documentary Never Say Goodbye was released. Along with Rusty Young and Jesse Colin Young, J. D. Blackfoot appeared in it.

== Discography ==
SinglesUS discography except for unique to New Zealand releases
Act	Title	Catalogue	Year	Notes #
J. D. Blackfoot	"Who's Nuts Alfred" / "Epitaph For A Head"	Philips 40625	1969	
J. D. Blackfoot	"One Time Woman" / "I've Never Seen You"	Philips 40679	1970	
J. D. Blackfoot with Uncle Billy	"Wonderin' Where You Are" / "It Don't Mean A Thing"	Peace 50944	1970	
J. D. Blackfoot	Savage / Almost Another Day	Peace 61776	1972	
J. D. Blackfoot	"Every Day" / "Every Night"	Peace 82941	197?	
J. D. Blackfoot	"Almost Another Day" / "Every Day - Every Night"	Family FAY 1039	1972	NZ Release
J. D. Blackfoot	"I've Been Waitin'" / "One Man's Story"	Pye PZS 1004	1973	NZ Release
J. D. Blackfoot	"Ride Away" / "Part Three From The Song Of Crazy Horse"	Pye PZS 1005	1973	NZ release
J. D. Blackfoot	"I've Been Waitin'" / "Hey Johnny D.J."	Pye PZS 1007	1974	NZ release
J. D. Blackfoot	"Twilight" / "Dove On The Ocean"	Fantasy F-741	1975	

EPs
Act	Title	Catalogue	Year	Notes #
J. D. Blackfoot	Nobody's Business; Side A 1. "Nobody's Business" 2. "Let Her Go"; Side B 1. "Stay The Night Away" / "He Walks On Past"	Bison Record Co. B-77-EP	1984	12" vinyl EP
J. D. Blackfoot	Ohio Dream: 1. "Missing You In St. Louis", 2. " I Should Have Told You", 3. "Ballerina"; 4. "The Ballad Of OB-1 Applewhite", 5. " All Alone", 6. "Ohio Dream", 7. "Black Widow"	Sisapa Record Co. 5948-2-EP	1997	CD EP

Albums
Act	Title	Catalogue	Year	Notes #
J. D. Blackfoot	The Ultimate Prophecy	Mercury SR-61288	1970	LP
J. D. Blackfoot	The Song Of Crazy Horse	Pye PZL 2001	1974	LP, NZ release (Released on Fantasy F-9468 in the U.S.)
J. D. Blackfoot	Southbound And Gone	Fantasy F-9487	1975	LP
J. D. Blackfoot	Live In St. Louis•July 16, 1982	Bison Record Co. B-44	1984	2 LP
J. D. Blackfoot	Tokala	Tokala 5944-2	1992	CD
J. D. Blackfoot	Co-Dependent Dysfunctional You	Yonder Music Y-2001-2 DBL	2001	2 CD
J. D. Blackfoot	Yellowhand	Yonder Music Ltd 2005-2	2005	CD
