= Finn (album) =

Studio album by the Finn Brothers
- Released: 1995
- Recorded: November 1994 – March 1995
- Studio: York Street Studios (Auckland)
- Genres: Rock, lo-fi
- Length: 38:23
- Label: Parlophone
- Producers: Tchad Blake; Neil Finn; Tim Finn

The Finn Brothers chronology
Finn (1995)	Everyone Is Here (2004)

Singles from Finn
- 1. "Suffer Never" Released: 2 October 1995; 2. "Angel's Heap" Released: 1995; 3. "Only Talking Sense" Released: 1996

Professional ratings
Review scores
Source	Rating
AllMusic	4.5/5 stars

Finn is the first album by the Finn Brothers, a music project of New Zealand brothers Tim and Neil Finn.

The album was produced by Tchad Blake and the Finn Brothers in Auckland, New Zealand. The songs "Suffer Never", "Angel's Heap" and "Only Talking Sense" were released as singles.

== Track listing ==
All tracks are written by Neil Finn and Tim Finn, except for "Last Day of June" by Neil Finn.

No.	Title	Length
1.	"Only Talking Sense"	3:04
2.	"Eyes of the World"	2:52
3.	"Mood Swinging Man"	4:06
4.	"Last Day of June"	3:18
5.	"Suffer Never"	4:00
6.	"Angel's Heap"	2:53
7.	"Niwhai"	3:36
8.	"Where Is My Soul"	4:10
9.	"Bullets in My Hairdo"	3:00
10.	"Paradise (Wherever You Are)"	3:59
11.	"Kiss the Road of Rarotonga"	3:25
Total length:		38:23

== Personnel ==
Personnel as listed in the album's liner notes are:

=== Musicians ===
- Neil Finn – vocals, electric guitars, 12-string acoustic guitar, bass guitar, cover artwork
- Tim Finn – vocals, acoustic guitar, keyboards and drums
- Dave Dobbyn – bass guitar (track 11)

=== Production ===
- Tchad Blake – engineering, mixing
- Nick Treacy, Nick Abbot – engineering
- Wayne Conway – design
- Ani O'Neill – kete in album booklet
- Kerry Brown, Darryl Ward – photography

== Charts ==
1995 chart performance for Finn
Chart (1995)	Peak position
Australian Albums (ARIA)	14
New Zealand Albums (RMNZ)	8
UK Albums (Official Charts)	15

2022 chart performance for Finn
Chart (2022)	Peak position
UK Independent Albums (Official Charts)	9
