= Sweet Talker (film) =

- Film poster
- Directed by: Michael Jenkins
- Written by: Tony Morphett
- Starring: Bryan Brown; Karen Allen; Chris Haywood; Bill Kerr; Bruce Spence; Bruce Myles; Paul Chubb; Peter Hehir; Justin Rosniak
- Music by: Richard Thompson
- Production company: New Visions Pictures
- Distributed by: Seven Arts (through New Line Cinema) (United States); Greater Union Organization (Australia)
- Release date: 1991
- Running time: 86 minutes
- Countries: Australia; United States
- Language: English
- Box office: A$109,638 (Australia)

Sweet Talker is a 1991 comedy film starring Bryan Brown and Karen Allen. It was directed by Michael Jenkins, who later described it as:

A real general audience film, a fairly gentle film about some relationships, almost father-son relationships, single mum relationship with her son. It's not what I would call a film that has major clout to it. It's an entertainment film, but what it says is not bad. It's a soft film - it doesn't really go out there pretending it's saying anything world-shattering... In this industry quite a few things are haphazard. Sweet Talker is one of the more haphazard projects that has come along.

The film's soundtrack, scored and performed by British singer/songwriter Richard Thompson was released by Capitol Records the same year the film was released.

== Cast ==
- Bryan Brown as Harry Reynolds
- Karen Allen as Julie Maguire
- Chris Haywood as Gerald Bostock
- Bill Kerr as Uncle "Cec"
- Bruce Spence as Norman Foster
- Bruce Myles as Mayor Jim Scraper
- Paul Chubb as Billy
- Peter Hehir
- Justin Rosniak as David Maguire
- Imogen Annesley as Salesperson
- Bruno Lucia as Mr. Thomas
- Gary Waddell as "Bluey"
