= Imaginary Kingdom =

Studio album by Tim Finn
- Released: 6 October 2006
- Genre: Pop
- Length: 39:41
- Label: Capitol
- Producer: Bobby Huff

Tim Finn chronology
Feeding the Gods (2001)	Imaginary Kingdom (2006)	The Conversation (2008)

Singles from Imaginary Kingdom
- 1. "Couldn't Be Done" Released: 23 September 2006; 2. "Horizon" Released: 2007

Professional ratings
Review scores
Source	Rating
AllMusic	link

Imaginary Kingdom is the seventh studio album by New Zealand singer/songwriter Tim Finn. It was released on 6 October 2006 and peaked at number 18 on the New Zealand chart and 48 in Australia.

== Track listing ==
All tracks are written by Tim Finn

No.	Title	Length
1.	"Couldn't Be Done"	2:50
2.	"Still the Song"	2:48
3.	"Astounding Moon"	3:35
4.	"Midnight Coma"	2:52
5.	"Salt to the Sea"	3:45
6.	"Horizon"	3:23
7.	"Dead Flowers"	3:37
8.	"Resting (Your Hand Lightly)"	3:20
9.	"Show Yourself"	3:01
10.	"Winter Light"	4:10
11.	"So Precious"	3:19
12.	"Unsinkable"	2:55

All tracks are written by Tim Finn, except where noted.

The BJB Sessions Bonus DVD
No.	Title	Length
1.	"Poor Boy"
2.	"How Will You Go" (Tim Finn, Neil Finn)
3.	"I Hope I Never"
4.	"Not Even Close"
5.	"Need to Be Right"
6.	"Angels Heap" (Tim Finn, Neil Finn)
7.	"Time for a Change" (Phil Judd, featuring Mike Chunn)

== Personnel ==
- Tim Finn - vocals, acoustic guitar, piano, backing vocals, conga, foot drums, celeste, synth FX, pump organ, Indian flute, keys, rhodes, banana drum, prepared piano, vocal arrangement on 2 & 9
- Bobby Huff - drums, backing vocals, percussion, programming, piano, organ, keys, electric guitar, backing vocals, vocal arrangement on 2 & 9
- John Painter - bass, french horn, keys, electric guitar, lap steel guitar, percussion, trombone, trumpet, recorder, dilruba, acoustic guitar, portachord, stylophone
- Dale Oliver - electric guitar, slide guitar, 12-string guitar, electric sitar
- Robbie Huff - electric guitar
- Victor Broden - bass on 1
- Phil Madeira - organ
- Nirva Dorsaint - backing vocals, guest vocalist on 9
- Fleming McWilliams - guest vocalist on 2 & 12
- Matt Walker - cello
- Harper Finn - child's voice on 12
- Tony Backhouse - vocal arrangement on 2, 9 & 11

== Charts ==
Chart (2006)	Peak position
Australian Albums (ARIA)	48
New Zealand Albums (RMNZ)	18
