= Persuasion (song) =

1993 single by Tim Finn

- Australasian CD single

Single by Tim Finn

from the album Before & After
- B-side: "Six Months in a Leaky Boat" (live); "Secret Heart"; "Not Even Close" (live); "Protected" (live)
- Released: 14 June 1993
- Studio: Festival (Sydney, Australia)
- Length: 4:14
- Label: Capitol
- Songwriters: Tim Finn; Richard Thompson; Peter Filleul
- Producers: Tim Finn; Mark Hart

Tim Finn singles chronology
"Islands" (1992)	"Persuasion" (1993)	"Hit the Ground Running" (1993)

"Persuasion" is a song written by Richard Thompson, Peter Filleul and Tim Finn. It was originally composed by Thompson and Filleul as an instrumental for the film Sweet Talker; Capitol Records stablemate Finn added the lyrics and released it in June 1993 as the lead single from his fourth studio album, Before & After. The song reached number six on the New Zealand Singles Chart and also charted in Australia, Germany and the United Kingdom.

Thompson admired Finn's lyrics and frequently played the song live himself, with versions appearing on his live albums Celtschmerz (1998) and Live From Austin, TX (2005). A studio version with his son Teddy Thompson was released on Action Packed (2001), the retrospective of Thompson's time with Capitol Records, and a solo acoustic version was included on his 2014 release Acoustic Classics.

== Track listings ==
Australian and New Zealand CD single

1. "Persuasion" (LP version) – 3:53
2. "Six Months in a Leaky Boat" (live) – 3:15
3. "Secret Heart" – 4:30
4. "Not Even Close" (live) – 4:59
5. "Protected" (live) – 6:02

UK CD1

1. "Persuasion" (LP version) – 3:53
2. "Parihaka" (featuring Herbs) – 3:20
3. "Secret Heart" 5:02
4. "Persuasion" (acoustic) (featuring Richard Thompson) – 6:03

UK CD2

1. "Persuasion" (LP version) – 3:53
2. "Six Months in a Leaky Boat" (live) – 3:15
3. "Not Even Close" (live) – 4:59
4. "Protected" (live) – 6:02

== Charts ==
Chart (1993)	Peak position
Australia (ARIA)	62
Germany (GfK)	76
New Zealand (Recorded Music NZ)	6
UK Singles (Official Charts)	43
