= Rumor and Sigh =

Studio album by Richard Thompson
- Released: May 1991
- Recorded: 1991
- Studio: Sunset Sound, Los Angeles and Konk Studios, London
- Genre: Folk rock, alternative rock
- Length: 61:19
- Label: Capitol
- Producer: Mitchell Froom

Richard Thompson chronology
| Sweet Talker (1991) | Rumor and Sigh (1991) | Watching the Dark (1993) |

Rumor and Sigh is a 1991 album by British singer/songwriter Richard Thompson, his thirteenth album since leaving the band Fairport Convention in 1971. Released on the Capitol label, it was a commercial success for Thompson, featuring his biggest American hit single "I Feel So Good", as well as the fan favourite "1952 Vincent Black Lightning”.

The album earned Thompson a nomination for the Grammy Award for Best Alternative Music Album in 1992. It was also voted number 665 in the third edition of Colin Larkin's All Time Top 1000 Albums (2000).

== Songs ==
The American spelling of the word "Rumor" is due to Thompson taking the title from a posthumously published poem by Archibald MacLeish: "Rumor and sigh of unimagined seas/ Dim radiance of stars that never flamed."

Patrick Humphries described the central character of the song "I Feel So Good" as a ne'er do well who has been freed from prison and expresses his "bullying exultation at his freedom." In an interview, Thompson explained, "If you make someone the subject of a song you're almost inevitably making him a hero. But he obviously isn't. Nor is he an anti-hero. He's no worse than the society that created him. It's a very twentieth century moral dilemma."

"Grey Walls" was inspired by Colney Hatch Mental Hospital in Barnet, North London, which Thompson passed on the bus as a teenager. The song describes the disturbing effect of ECT on psychiatric patients. Thompson has also called the song a comment on the effects of Thatcherism—in the context of closing down mental institutions and selling the facilities for profit.

Thompson has said he was inspired to write "Don't Sit On My Jimmy Shands" after hearing a story of Bob Dylan at a party, hogging the record player so he could play only Robert Johnson recordings. Thompson planned his song as a tongue in cheek tribute to Jimmy Shand, Scottish musician who achieved popularity in the 1930s and 40s by arranging traditional Scottish songs for his accordion band. Shand's music loomed large in Thompson's childhood.

Thompson wrote "Mother Knows Best" to mark the resignation of Margaret Thatcher and express his feelings about the departed Conservative Prime Minister: "She says 'Bring me your first-born. And I'll suck their blood/ Bring me your poor/ I can trample in the mud'."

Although a teetotaller, Thompson wrote "God Loves A Drunk" to suggest that alcoholism can be a path to spiritual ecstasy. He has described the song as "a swipe at Mormons and Seventh Day Adventists, those people with the polyester suits, those people who are very clean and neat, which means they must be alright with God."

The track "1952 Vincent Black Lightning," despite not being issued as a single, became a fan favourite and is one of Thompson's most highly acclaimed solo compositions. In 2011 Time magazine listed the song in its "All TIME 100 Songs", a list of "the most extraordinary English-language popular recordings since the beginning of TIME magazine in 1923."

== Release ==
Professional ratings
Review scores
| Source | Rating |
|---|---|
| AllMusic | 4/5 stars |
| Chicago Tribune | 4/4 stars |
| Entertainment Weekly | A |
| Los Angeles Times | 3.5/5 stars |
| NME | 8/10 |
| Q | 4/5 stars |
| Rolling Stone | 3.5/5 stars |
| Select | 4/5 |
| USA Today | 3.5/4 stars |
| The Village Voice | B+ |

The album peaked at number 32 on the UK Albums Chart and was Thompson's first Top 40 album in the UK. The album did not chart in the US, although the lead single "I Feel So Good" peaked at number 15 on the Billboard Modern Rock Tracks chart, his second and highest-charting single on that chart. Its follow-up single, "Read About Love" failed to chart.

Two videos, for "I Feel So Good" (animation inspired by the cover artwork) and album track "I Misunderstood" were produced to promote the album. Thompson also promoted the album's American release by performing "I Feel So Good" on Late Night with David Letterman.

The album was nominated for the Grammy Award for Best Alternative Music Album in 1992, but lost to R.E.M.'s Out of Time.

== Track listing ==
All tracks are written by Richard Thompson.

Rumor and Sigh track listing
| No. | Title | Length |
|---|---|---|
| 1. | "Read About Love" | 3:34 |
| 2. | "I Feel So Good" | 3.21 |
| 3. | "I Misunderstood" | 4.05 |
| 4. | "Grey Walls" | 4:21 |
| 5. | "You Dream Too Much" | 4:06 |
| 6. | "Why Must I Plead" | 4:58 |
| 7. | "1952 Vincent Black Lightning" | 4:43 |
| 8. | "Backlash Love Affair" | 4:49 |
| 9. | "Mystery Wind" | 4:35 |
| 10. | "Don't Sit on My Jimmy Shands" | 4:26 |
| 11. | "Keep Your Distance" | 4:11 |
| 12. | "Mother Knows Best" | 4:59 |
| 13. | "God Loves a Drunk" | 4:43 |
| 14. | "Psycho Street" | 4:28 |

== Personnel ==
=== Musicians ===
- Richard Thompson – guitar, vocals, mandolin, hurdy-gurdy
- Mitchell Froom – piano, Hammond organ, portative organ, Chamberlin, celeste, clavioline, echo harp
- Jerry Scheff – bass guitar
- Mickey Curry – drums (1, 2, 5, 8, 9 & 11)
- Jim Keltner – drums
- Alex Acuña – percussion
- Christine Collister and Clive Gregson – backing vocals
- John Kirkpatrick – accordion, concertina, backing vocals
- Phil Pickett – shawm, crumhorn, curtal
- Simon Nicol – guitar
- Aly Bain – fiddle

=== Technical ===
- Recording engineer: Dave Leonard; 2nd engineer: Mike Kloster
- Overdubs recorded: Lance Phillips, RAK Studios, London and Tchad Blake, Sunset Sound Factory
- Mixed: Tchad Blake, Ocean Way Studios, Los Angeles; 2nd engineer: Paula "Max" Garcia
- Mastered: Bob Ludwig at Masterdisk
- Vincent Motorcycle: kindly loaned by Dick Busby

=== Artwork ===
- Cover Art: Laura Levine
- Photography: Laura Levine
- Set Design: Kelly Ray
- Art Direction: Tommy Steele
- Design: Jeffery Fey

== Sources ==
- Humphries, Patrick (1996). Richard Thompson: Strange Affair - The Biography. Virgin Books. ISBN 0-86369-993-6.
