= Made My Day =

1983 single by Tim Finn

Single by Tim Finn

from the album Escapade
- Released: August 1983
- Studio: Festival Studios, Sydney
- Genre: Pop
- Length: 3:23
- Label: Mushroom Records
- Songwriter(s): Tim Finn
- Producer(s): Mark Moffatt, Ricky Fataar

Tim Finn singles chronology
"Fraction Too Much Friction" (1983)	"Made My Day" (1983)	"Through the Years" (1983)

"Made My Day" is a song by New Zealand musician, Tim Finn, released in August 1983 as the second single from his debut studio album, Escapade. The song reached number 22 in Australia.

== Track listing ==
Australian/New Zealand 7" single (K-9186)

- A. "Made My Day" - 3:23
- B. "Another Chance" - 4:48

== Charts ==
Chart (1983)	Peak position
Australia (Kent Music Report)	22
