= Fraction Too Much Friction =

1983 single by Tim Finn

Single by Tim Finn

from the album Escapade
- Released: May 1983
- Studio: Festival Studios, Sydney
- Genre: Pop
- Length: 4:14
- Label: Mushroom Records
- Songwriter(s): Tim Finn
- Producer(s): Mark Moffatt, Ricky Fataar

Tim Finn singles chronology
"Fraction Too Much Friction" (1983)	"Made My Day" (1983)

"Fraction Too Much Friction" is a song by New Zealand musician, Tim Finn, released in May 1983 as his debut single from his debut studio album, Escapade. The song reached number 2 on the New Zealand charts and number 8 in Australia.

At the 1983 Countdown Australian Music Awards, "Fraction Too Much Friction" won Best Video.

The song was covered by Wilbur Wilde for the Australian film The Coolangatta Gold (1984).

== Track listing ==
Australian/New Zealand 7" single (K-9118)

- A. "Fraction Too Much Friction – 4:14
- B. "Below the Belt" – 4:20

== Charts ==
=== Weekly charts ===
Weekly chart performance for "Fraction Too Much Friction"
Chart (1983)	Peak position
Australia (Kent Music Report)	8
Belgium (Ultratop Flanders)	4
Netherlands (Single Top 100)	2
New Zealand (Recorded Music NZ)	2

=== Year-end charts ===
Year-end chart performance for "Fraction Too Much Friction"
Chart (1983)	Position
Australia (Kent Music Report)	51
