= 1952 Vincent Black Lightning =

Song by Richard Thompson

from the album Rumor and Sigh
- Released: May 1991
- Recorded: 1991
- Studio: Sunset Sound, Los Angeles and Konk Studios, London
- Genre: Folk
- Length: 4:43
- Songwriter: Richard Thompson
- Producer: Mitchell Froom

Music video
- "1952 Vincent Black Lightning" on YouTube

"1952 Vincent Black Lightning" is a song by English guitarist and songwriter Richard Thompson from his 1991 album Rumor and Sigh. It tells the story of a thief named James and the girl Red Molly whom he charms with a ride on his 1952 Vincent Black Lightning motorcycle, which he bequeaths to her on his deathbed. In 2011 Time magazine listed the song in its "All TIME 100 Songs", a list of "the most extraordinary English-language popular recordings since the beginning of TIME magazine in 1923," praising it as "a glorious example of what one guy can accomplish with just a guitar, a voice, an imagination and a set of astonishingly nimble fingers."

Despite not being issued as a single, the ballad became a fan favourite and is one of Thompson's most highly acclaimed solo compositions. A live version of the song appears on Thompson's album Two Letter Words: Live 1994.

The band Red Molly, who has covered the song, takes its name from the lead female character in the song.

== The motorcycle ==
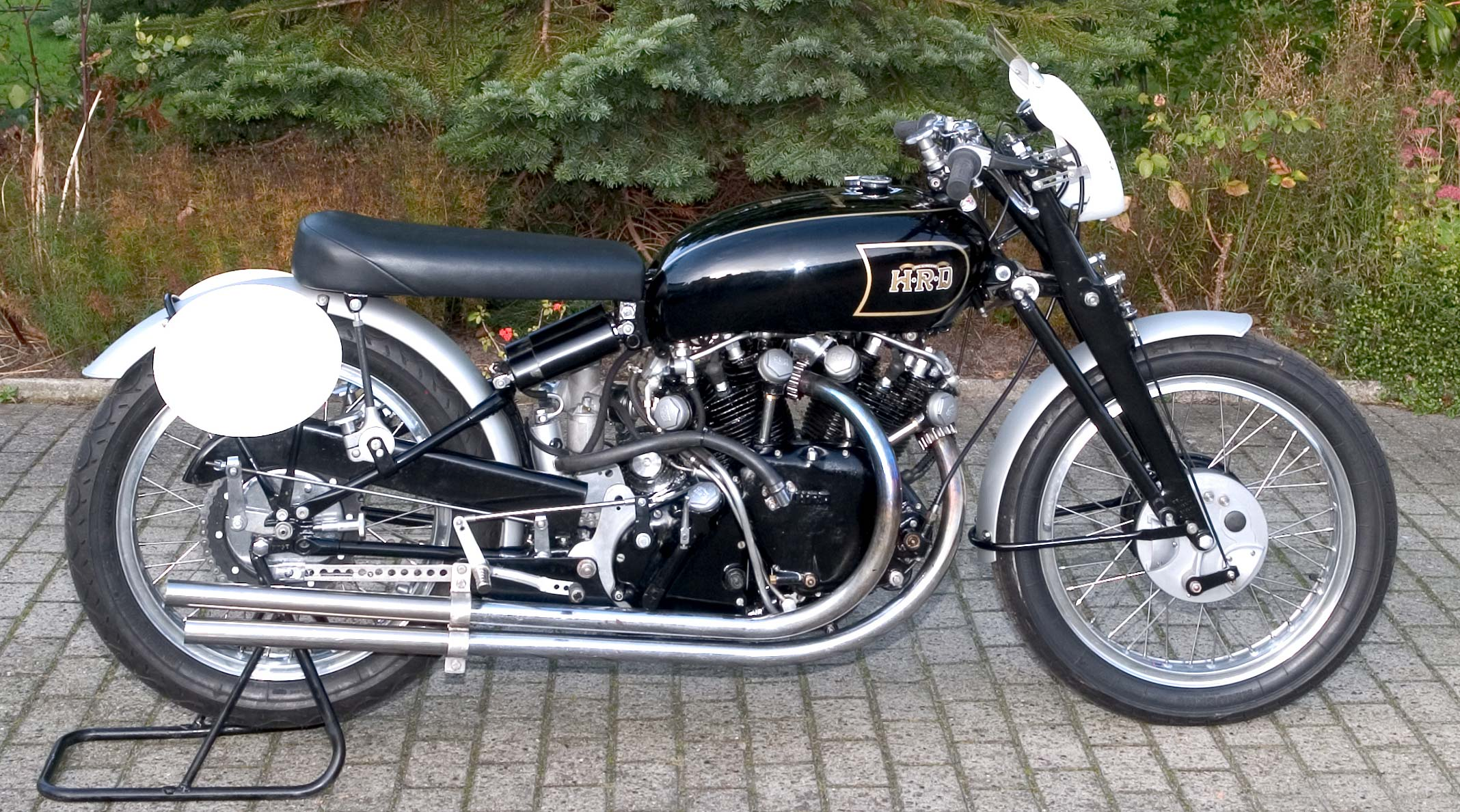
A Vincent Black Lightning

The song focuses on the main character's love for both his girlfriend and his 1952 Vincent Black Lightning, a rare British motorcycle of which perhaps 30 were made. The character James compares it to other cycles of the age in his dying speech:

Says James, in my opinion, there's nothing in this world
Beats a '52 Vincent and a red headed girl.
Now Nortons and Indians and Greeveses won't do
They don't have a soul like a Vincent '52.

While most cover versions of this song by different artists remain with the original lyrics listing those same three makes of motorcycle (that "don't have a soul like a Vincent '52"), Thompson himself often varies the makes in his performances, variously including the following makes: Triumph, Harley, Enfield, Douglas, Rudge, Matchless, and Ducati.

Interviewed in the 2003 BBC Four documentary Solitary Life, Thompson said: "When I was a kid, that was always the exotic bike, that was always the one, the one that you went "ooh, wow". I'd always been looking for English ideas that didn't sound corny, that had some romance to them, and around which you could pin a song. And this song started with a motorcycle, it started with the Vincent. It was a good lodestone around which the song could revolve".

== Covers ==
The song has been covered by many artists:

- Dick Gaughan, on Sail On (1996)
- Jeff Lang, on Disturbed Folk (1995) and Disturbed Folk vol. 2 (1999)
- Del McCoury Band, on Del and the Boys (2001)
- Bob Dylan, during a concert at Clarkston, Michigan, on 14 July 2013. When Thompson heard Dylan's cover of the song, he said, "It was a surprise, totally. I thought it was a hoax. I thought it was a joke!"
- Sean Rowe, as a frequent concert staple
- Robert Earl Keen on Happy Prisoner: The Bluegrass Sessions (2015)

American artists who cover the song frequently change the place reference, Box Hill to Knoxville.
