= Big Canoe =

Studio album by Tim Finn
- Released: April 1986
- Genre: Pop
- Length: 44:31 (LP release); 51:54 (CD release)
- Label: Virgin
- Producer: Nick Launay

Tim Finn chronology
Escapade (1983)	Big Canoe (1986)	Tim Finn (1989)

Singles from Big Canoe
- 1. "No Thunder, No Fire, No Rain" Released: April 1986; 2. "Spiritual Hunger" Released: June 1986; 3. "Carve You in Marble" Released: July 1986

Professional ratings
Review scores
Source	Rating
Allmusic	3/5 stars

Big Canoe is the second studio album released by Tim Finn in April 1986. The album peaked at number 3 in New Zealand and number 31 in Australia.

== Track listing ==
All tracks are written by Tim Finn and Jeremy Brock, except where noted.

Side one
No.	Title	Writer(s)	Length
1.	"Spiritual Hunger"	Finn; Brock; Phil Judd	4:36
2.	"Don't Bury My Heart"		4:25
3.	"Timmy"		3:44
4.	"So Deep"		3:17
5.	"No Thunder, No Fire, No Rain"		5:12
Total length:			21:14

Side two
No.	Title	Writer(s)	Length
6.	"Carve You in Marble"	Finn	5:40
7.	"Water Into Wine"		4:09
8.	"Hyacinth"		4:58
9.	"Big Canoe"		4:39
10.	"Are We One Or Are We Two"	Finn	3:51
Total length:			23:17 44:31

=== CD release ===
The CD release included two extra songs, "Searching the Streets" and "Hole in My Heart".

No.	Title	Writer(s)	Length
1.	"Spiritual Hunger"	Finn; Brock; Judd	4:36
2.	"Don't Bury My Heart"		4:25
3.	"Timmy"		3:44
4.	"So Deep"		3:17
5.	"No Thunder, No Fire, No Rain"		5:12
6.	"Searching the Streets"		4:11
7.	"Carve You in Marble"	Finn	5:40
8.	"Water Into Wine"		4:09
9.	"Hyacinth"		4:58
10.	"Big Canoe"		4:39
11.	"Hole in My Heart"	Finn	3:12
12.	"Are We One Or Are We Two"	Finn	3:51
Total length:			51:54

== Personnel ==
Personnel as listed in the album's liner notes are:

=== Musicians ===
- Tim Finn — vocals, keyboards, piano, brass arrangements
- Geoff Dugmore — drums, percussion, occasional scream vocals
- Steve Greetham — bass guitar
- Jon McLoughlin — guitars
- Phil Judd – intro composition and guitar synthesizer on "Spiritual Hunger", brass arrangements on "So Deep", rhythm guitar on "Water Into Wine", sitar and guitar on "Hyacinth"
- Norma Lewis, Wendy Harris — backing vocals
- Mark McGann — backing vocals on "Hyacinth"
- Paul Wickens, Danny Schogger – keyboards
- Anne Dudley – string arrangements
- Skaila Kanga – harp on "Hyacinth"
- Pandit Dinesh – tabla and Indian percussion on "No Thunder, No Fire, No Rain"
- Danny Cummings – congas on "Searching the Streets"
- Gary Barnacle – electric saxophone, brass arrangements
- Luke Tunney, Simon Gardner – trumpet
- Pete Toms – trombone

=== Production ===
- Nick Launay — mixing engineer, producer
- Martin White, Paul Cook — assistant engineers

== Charts ==
Chart (1986)	Peak position
Australia (Kent Music Report)	31
New Zealand Albums (RMNZ)	3

== Certifications ==
Region	Certification	Certified units/sales
New Zealand (RMNZ)	Gold	7,500^{^}
^{^} Shipments figures based on certification alone.
