= Altitude (Yellow Second album) =

Studio album by Yellow Second
- Released: March 8, 2005
- Genre: power pop
- Length: 49:42
- Label: Floodgate Records

Yellow Second chronology
Still Small (2002)	Altitude (2005)

Professional ratings
Review scores
Source	Rating
Allmusic	4/5 stars

Altitude is the third and final full-length album by the band Yellow Second, released on March 8, 2005 by Floodgate Records. Altitude was the only Yellow Second album to receive distribution via a major label, making it the band's most prevalent and well-known album.

== Track listing ==
1. "Silhouette" – 3:19
2. "Chance of Sunbreaks" – 3:41
3. "Forget What You've Heard" – 4:07
4. "Material" – 3:39
5. "Plume" – 4:01
6. "Mulberry" – 3:53
7. "Some Other Way" – 2:53
8. "Gravity Boots" - 3:21
9. "Seed" – 3:58
10. "Fall Out of Line" – 4:16
11. "Hello To Never" – 4:29
12. "I Can Awake" – 3:57
13. "Imaginary Friend" – 4:10

== Personnel ==
- Scott Kerr - vocals, guitar, synthesizer
- Josh Hemingway - guitar
- Brett Bowden/John Warne - bass guitar
- Andy Verdecchio - drums
