= Julie Mason =

American journalist (born 1966)

Radio Show Host / Political Journalist

Personal details
- Born: December 11, 1966 (age 59)
- Spouse: ()
- Education: Lawrence Academy; American University
- Occupation: Journalist; radio personality

Julie Mason (born December 11, 1966) is an American journalist and the host of "The Julie Mason Show" on SiriusXM radio's POTUS channel. Previously, she hosted "Julie Mason Mornings" and "The Press Pool" on POTUS.

== Professional life ==
Mason was a White House correspondent for the Houston Chronicle, Washington Examiner and Politico during the George W. Bush administration and the first term of Barack Obama's administration. She was with the Chronicle for twenty years.

Mason's first job was as a clerk in the Washington bureau of the Dallas Morning News, and In 1988 she went to Texas to work as a reporter with the Houston Chronicle. She was transferred to the newspaper's Washington bureau in 2001 but was laid off in 2008 while serving as the paper's White House correspondent. She worked at the Washington Examiner as a White House reporter until 2010, when she joined Politico's White House team. She joined SiriusXM in 2011. In 2014, Mason received the Gracie Award from the Alliance for Women in the Media for outstanding achievement as a radio talk show host. She has been the secretary and a board member of the White House Correspondents' Association.

She has been noted for her impressions of notable figures such as Laura Bush, Michelle Obama, Elizabeth Warren and John Boehner. Readers of FishbowlDC in 2012 voted Mason "class clown" of the Washington press corps.

One report said that Mason is known for her "bawdy personality and quick wit." Television commentator Bill O'Reilly in 2014 called her a "loon" because, according to him, she suggested that he and Glenn Beck may have damaged the Fox News "brand."

In 2011, White House press secretary Jay Carney called one of Mason's stories "partisan, inflammatory and tendentious," and U.S. National Security Council spokesperson Tommy Vietor sent her an e-mail that included an animated picture of a crying mime, a "visual suggestion that she was whining," according to Washington Post columnist Paul Farhi.

== Personal life ==
Mason grew up in Acton, Massachusetts, graduated from Lawrence Academy at Groton, Massachusetts, and attended American University in Washington, D.C.

In May 1996, she married David Messina of Houston in the Graceland Chapel in Las Vegas, Nevada, where a Presley impersonator walked her down the aisle and serenaded her afterward.

In 2011, she lived in Washington, in the Dupont-Logan-U Street-Columbia Heights area.

Mason is a reader of Tarot cards.

== Quotations ==
- Tara Parker-Pope recalled that when she and Mason were reporters on the Houston Chronicle, the former stopped by Mason's desk to ask a question. Mason turned around "to show me I had her full attention" and said, "I've always got five minutes for a friend."
- Laura Bush was the "iron rod" at George W. Bush's back. "She keeps him from going too far off the deep end when he gets all caught up in his cock-of-the-walk behavior."
