= Before & After (Tim Finn album) =

Studio album by Tim Finn
- Released: July 1993
- Recorded: 1992–93
- Genre: Pop
- Length: 49:29
- Label: Capitol
- Producer: Various

Tim Finn chronology
Tim Finn (1989)	Before & After (1993)	Steel City (1998)

Singles from Before & After
- 1. "Persuasion" Released: June 1993; 2. "Hit The Ground Running" Released: October 1993; 3. "Many's the Time" Released: April 1994

Professional ratings
Review scores
Source	Rating
Allmusic	4/5 stars

Before & After is the fourth studio album by New Zealand singer/songwriter Tim Finn, released in July 1993.

== Reception ==
Rolling Stone Australia claimed the album was "Tim Finn's best work in a recording career spanning almost twenty years. Finn has simplified his song-writing, finally dumping the clever-clever curlicues that have blurred his past work." The reviewer did note that production was, "sweet and shiny, to please radio programmers."

== Track listing ==
All tracks are written by Tim Finn unless noted.

No.	Title	Writer(s)	Producers	Length
1.	"Hit the Ground Running"		Clive Langer; Alan Winstanley	4:41
2.	"Protected"		T. Finn; Dave Bascombe; Ricky Fataar	5:24
3.	"In Love with It All"	T. Finn; Neil Finn	T. Finn	3:21
4.	"Persuasion"	T. Finn; Richard Thompson	T. Finn; Mark Hart	3:53
5.	"Many's the Time (In Dublin)"	T. Finn; Andy White; Liam Ó Maonlaí	Bascombe	4:27
6.	"Funny Way"		T. Finn; Hart	2:53
7.	"Can't Do Both"		Langer; Winstanley	4:52
8.	"In Your Sway"		T. Finn; Paul Kosky; Nicky Bomba	4:49
9.	"Strangeness and Charm"	T. Finn; N. Finn	T. Finn	3:24
10.	"Always Never Now"		Langer; Winstanley	3:56
11.	"Walk You Home"		Langer; Winstanley	3:37
12.	"I Found It"		T. Finn; Fataar	4:12
Total length:				49:29

== Personnel ==
Personnel as listed in the album's liner notes are:

=== Musicians ===
- Tim Finn – vocals (all tracks), production (2–4, 6, 8, 9, 12), Roland Jupiter-8 synthesizer (2), B minor bar chord (4), acoustic guitar (4–6), keyboards (5, 7, 12), piano (5, 7), additional percussion (7)
- Chris Ballin – backing vocals (1, 10)
- Claudia Fontaine – backing vocals (1, 7, 10)
- Steve Lewison – bass guitar (1, 7, 10, 11)
- Michael den Elzen – electric guitar (1, 7, 10–12), bass guitar (2, 8, 12)
- Pete Lewinson – drums (1, 7, 10, 11)
- Thomas Dyani – percussion (1, 7, 10, 11)
- Steve Nieve – keyboards (1, 7, 10, 11)
- Maurice Roycroft – keyboards (2)
- Ricky Fataar – drums (2, 12), production (2)
- Noel Eccles – percussion (2, 5)
- Hothouse Flowers – backing band (3, 5, 9)
- Geoffrey Hales – percussion (3, 8, 9)
- Eddie Rayner – keyboards (3, 9)
- Neil Finn – vocals, guitar and keyboards (3, 9)
- Mark Hart – keyboards and vocals (4, 6, 8), mandolin (4), production (4, 6), electric guitar (6, 8)
- Cliff Hugo – bass guitar (4, 6)
- Steve Dudas – electric guitar (4, 6, 12)
- Andy White – vocals, electric guitar and 12-string acoustic guitar (5)
- Peter O'Toole – bass guitar and bouzouki (5)
- Davy Spillane – Uilleann pipes (5)
- Liam Ó Maonlaí – vocals (5, 9)
- Tom Walsh – drums (6), percussion (8)
- Nicky Bomba – drums, backing vocals and production (8)
- Dror Erez – piano and piano accordion (8)
- Matthew Taylor – violin (8)
- Tina Copa, Tony Copa – backing vocals (8)
- Bette Bright – spoken voice (11)

=== Production ===
- Clive Langer, Alan Winstanley – production (1, 7, 10, 11)
- Danton Supple – engineering (1, 7, 10, 11)
- Paul Kosky – engineering (2, 3, 7–9, 12), production (8)
- Dave Bascombe – production (2, 5), mixing (3, 5, 9)
- Willie Mannion – engineering (2, 5)
- Lydia Cagney – engineering (3)
- Pat McCarthy – engineering (3, 5, 9)
- Craig Doubet – engineering (4, 6, 8)
- Dave Leonard – engineering and mixing (4, 6, 8)
- John Scott – engineering (5)
- Greg Penny – mixing (7)
- Sarah Chapman, Simon Chapman – mixing (12)

== Charts ==
Chart (1993)	Peak position
Australian Albums (ARIA)	34
Dutch Albums (Album Top 100)	72
New Zealand Albums (RMNZ)	3
United Kingdom (Official Charts Company)	29
