= Everyone Is Here =

Studio album by the Finn Brothers
- Released: 23 August 2004
- Recorded: February–March 2004
- Studio: Cello Studios (Los Angeles)
- Genre: Alternative rock
- Length: 45:42
- Labels: Nettwerk (US/Canada); Parlophone (international)
- Producers: Mitchell Froom; Jon Brion; Tony Visconti

The Finn Brothers chronology
Finn (1995)	Everyone Is Here (2004)

Professional ratings
Review scores
Source	Rating
AllMusic	4.5/5 stars
The Age	3.5/5 stars
Entertainment.ie	4/5 stars
Pitchfork	6.7/10
PopMatters	(positive)

Everyone Is Here is the second album by the Finn Brothers, a music project of New Zealand brothers Tim and Neil Finn.

The album was recorded twice, once in upstate New York with famed Bowie producer Tony Visconti, then again six months later in Los Angeles with Crowded House stalwart Mitchell Froom. Some of the songs from the first recording session were kept as B-sides and later appeared on a special edition of the album.

"Won't Give In" was featured on the soundtrack to the film Because of Winn-Dixie. "Luckiest Man Alive" was used in the closing to the 2005 Indianapolis 500 in response to Danica Patrick's performance in that event.

== Track listing ==
All tracks are written by Neil Finn and Tim Finn, except where noted.

No.	Title	Writer(s)	Length
1.	"Won't Give In"		4:17
2.	"Nothing Wrong with You"		4:10
3.	"Anything Can Happen"		3:04
4.	"Luckiest Man Alive"		3:56
5.	"Homesick"		3:48
6.	"Disembodied Voices"		3:40
7.	"A Life Between Us"		3:53
8.	"All God's Children"		3:47
9.	"Edible Flowers"	N. Finn; T. Finn; Eddie Rayner; Nigel Griggs; Noel Crombie	4:51
10.	"All the Colours"	T. Finn	2:11
11.	"Part of Me, Part of You"		3:29
12.	"Gentle Hum"	N. Finn	4:36
Total length:			45:42

Bonus track on digital release
No.	Title	Length
13.	"Way Back Down"	4:11

=== 2005 special edition ===
Bonus DVD
No.	Title	Length
1.	"Anything Can Happen" (live from Bedford Theatre)	3:41
2.	"I Got You" (live from Wellington)	4:06
3.	"Nothing Wrong with You" (live from Wellington)	4:15
4.	"Weather with You" (live from Music Max Australia) (featuring Paul Hester)	4:01
5.	"Won't Give In" (live from Music Max Australia)	4:56
6.	"Edible Flowers"	4:06

Audio
No.	Title	Length
1.	"Sunset Swim"	3:50
2.	"Way Back Down"	4:09
3.	"Everyday Alright"	3:05
4.	"The Land Torments the Sea"	3:29
5.	"Luckiest Man Alive" (Visconti version)	3:53

== Charts ==
Chart (2004)	Peak position
Australian Albums (ARIA)	2
Belgian Albums (Ultratop Flanders)	27
Dutch Albums (Album Top 100)	62
New Zealand Albums (RMNZ)	1
UK Albums (Official Charts)	8

== Certifications ==
Region	Certification	Certified units/sales
Australia (ARIA)	Gold	35,000^{^}
^{^} Shipments figures based on certification alone.
