= Escapade (Tim Finn album) =

Studio album by Tim Finn
- Released: 15 June 1983
- Studio: Festival Studios (Sydney)
- Genre: Pop
- Length: 36:48 (AU/NZ release); 37:16 (US release)
- Label: Mushroom
- Producers: Ricky Fataar; Mark Moffatt

Tim Finn chronology
Escapade (1983)	Big Canoe (1986)

Singles from Escapade
- 1. "Fraction Too Much Friction" Released: May 1983; 2. "Made My Day" Released: August 1983; 3. "Through the Years" Released: August 1983 (US and Canada); 4. "Staring at the Embers" Released: October 1983; 5. "In a Minor Key" Released: February 1984

Professional ratings
Review scores
Source	Rating
AllMusic	3/5 stars

Escapade is the debut studio album by New Zealand musician and founder of Split Enz, Tim Finn. Released in June 1983, the album peaked at number 1 in New Zealand and number 8 in Australia.

At the 1983 Countdown Australian Music Awards the album won Best Australian Album and "Fraction Too Much Friction" won Best Video.

== Track listing ==
All tracks are written by Tim Finn.

=== Australia and New Zealand release ===
Side one
No.	Title	Length
1.	"Fraction Too Much Friction"	4:14
2.	"Made My Day"	3:25
3.	"Not for Nothing"	3:28
4.	"In a Minor Key"	3:46
5.	"Grand Adventure"	3:52
Total length:		18:45

Side two
No.	Title	Length
6.	"Staring at the Embers"	3:05
7.	"Wait and See"	4:01
8.	"I Only Want to Know"	4:05
9.	"Growing Pains"	3:02
10.	"Through the Years"	3:50
Total length:		18:03 36:48

=== United States release ===
The US release featured an alternate track listing, with "Below the Belt" replacing "Grand Adventure".

Side one
No.	Title	Length
1.	"Fraction Too Much Friction"	4:14
2.	"Staring at the Embers"	3:05
3.	"Through the Years"	3:50
4.	"Not for Nothing"	3:28
5.	"In a Minor Key"	3:46
Total length:		18:23

Side two
No.	Title	Length
6.	"Made My Day"	3:25
7.	"Wait and See"	4:01
8.	"Below the Belt"	4:20
9.	"I Only Want to Know"	4:05
10.	"Growing Pains"	3:02
Total length:		18:53 37:16

== Personnel ==
Personnel as listed in the album's liner notes are:

=== Musicians ===
- Tim Finn – vocals, piano
- Ricky Fataar – drums, percussion, keyboard, backing vocals, production
- Chris Haig – bass guitar
- Sam McNally, Amanda Vincent – synthesizers
- Mark Moffatt – guitars, production
- Venetta Fields – backing vocals
- Richard Tee – piano on "Fraction Too Much Friction"; Rhodes piano on "In a Minor Key" and "Wait and See"
- Wilbur Wilde, Joe Camilleri – saxophone
- Peter Cross – trumpet
- Vince Gill – mandolin on "Grand Adventure"
- Doug Lacey – steel drums on "Grand Adventure"
- Phil Scorgie – bass guitar on "Grand Adventure"

=== Production ===
- Tim Kramer — engineering
- Paul Ibbotson — mastering
- Robert Pearce — album design
- Grant Matthews — cover photography

== Charts ==
=== Weekly charts ===
Weekly chart performance for Escapade
Chart (1983–1984)	Peak position
Australian Albums (Kent Music Report)	8
Canada Top Albums/CDs (RPM)	90
Dutch Albums (Album Top 100)	17
New Zealand Albums (RMNZ)	1
US Billboard 200	161

=== Year-end charts ===
Year-end chart performance for Escapade
Chart (1983)	Position
Australian Albums (Kent Music Report)	22
