= Feeding the Gods =

Studio album by Tim Finn
- Released: June 2001
- Genre: Pop
- Length: 40.06; 41:46 [US Version]
- Label: Sonny's Pop Records
- Producer: Jay Joyce

Tim Finn chronology
| Together in Concert: Live (2000) | Feeding the Gods (2001) | Imaginary Kingdom (2006) |

Singles from Feeding the Gods
- 1. "What You've Done" Released: November 2001

Professional ratings
Review scores
| Source | Rating |
|---|---|
| Allmusic | 3/5 stars |
| New Zealand Musician | Favourable |

Feeding the Gods is the sixth solo album by New Zealand singer/songwriter Tim Finn, released in June 2001. The album peaked at number 27 in New Zealand.

== Track listing ==
All tracks are written by Tim Finn, except where noted.

Australia/New Zealand track listing:
| No. | Title | Length |
|---|---|---|
| 1. | "Songline" | 3:18 |
| 2. | "I'll Never Know (remix/edit)" | 3:07 |
| 3. | "What You've Done" (Tim Finn, Andy White & Liam O'Maonlai) | 3:42 |
| 4. | "Sawdust & Splinters" | 3:58 |
| 5. | "Party Was You" | 3:13 |
| 6. | "Incognito In California" (Phil Judd) | 3:41 |
| 7. | "Say It Is So" (Tim Finn, Andy White) | 2:43 |
| 8. | "Subway Dreaming" | 4:14 |
| 9. | "Dead Man" | 3:58 |
| 10. | "Waiting For Your Moment" | 2:45 |
| 11. | "Commonplace" | 4:56 |

== Personnel ==
- Tim Finn - lead vocals, lead guitar
- Jay Joyce - guitars
- John Walsh - guitar technician
- Matt Eccles - drums
- Mareea Paterson - bass
- Don McGlashan - euphonium
- Kirsten Morelle - vocals
- Geoffrey Maddock - vocals
- Janey Dunn - facts & figures

== Charts ==
| Chart (2001) | Peak position |
|---|---|
| New Zealand Albums (RMNZ) | 27 |
