= Andy White (singer-songwriter) =

Northern Irish singer-songwriter, performer, poet and author

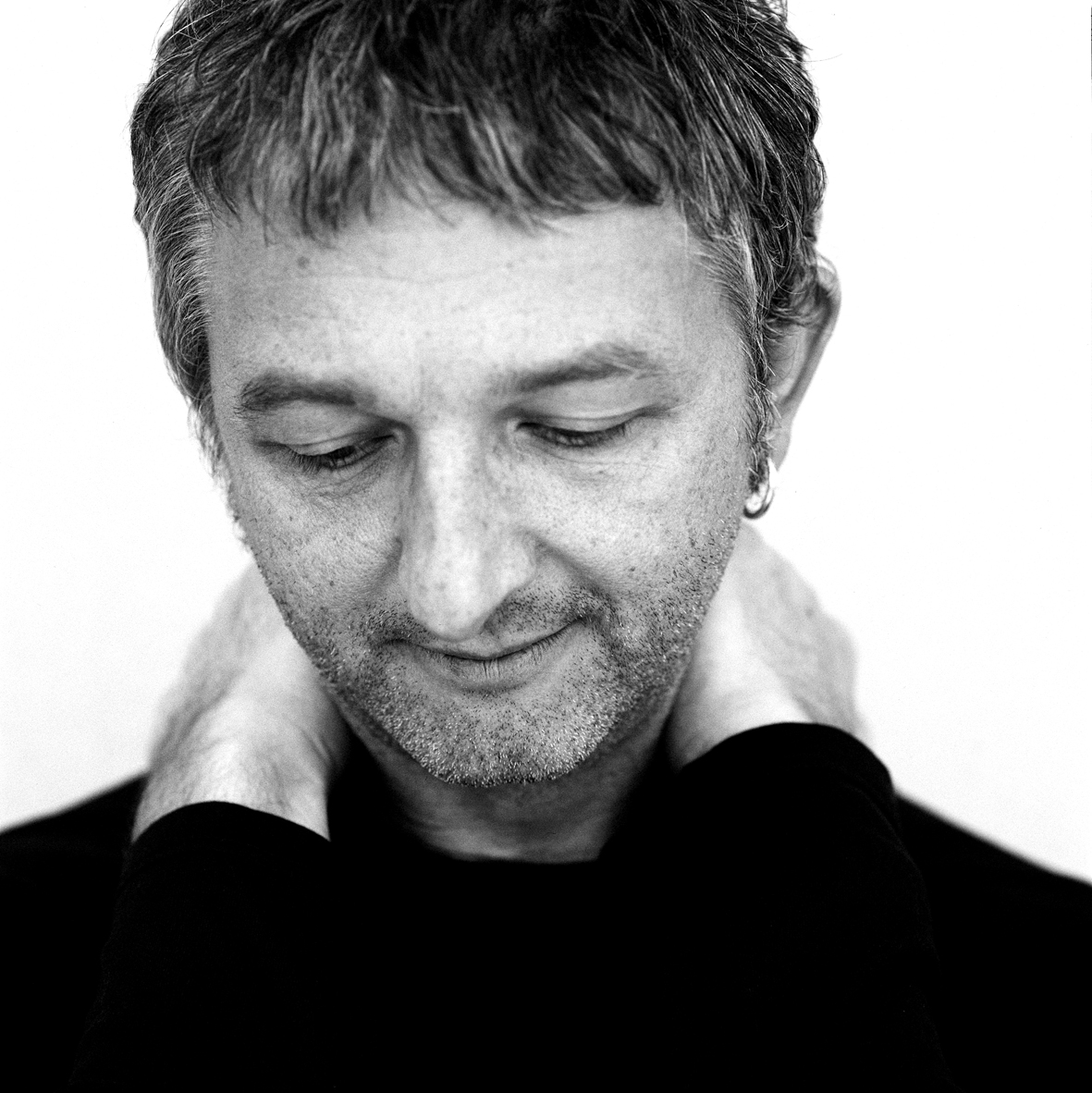
- Born: 28 May 1962 (age 64); Belfast, Northern Ireland
- Education: Cambridge University, England
- Known for: Music
- Notable work: Rave On Andy White, 1986
- Awards: Songwriter of the Year (Hot Press), MA (Cantab), PhD

Andy White (born 28 May 1962) is a Northern Irish singer-songwriter, poet and author, born in Belfast. He started writing poetry and music early, penning poems including one called "Riots" aged nine which was later included in his first collection. Playing bass and then acoustic guitar, White attended Methodist College Belfast and studied English Literature at Robinson College, Cambridge, graduating in 1984.

He released his first EP Religious Persuasion in 1985 on Stiff Records, and debut album Rave on Andy White in 1986. Since then he has released fourteen solo albums plus numerous compilations and live albums, and has collaborated with many other artists including Peter Gabriel, Sinéad O'Connor and English producer John Leckie. White won Ireland's Hot Press Songwriter of the Year Award in 1993.

In 1995, he released an album (Altitude) with Tim Finn (of Split Enz) and Liam Ó Maonlaí (of Hothouse Flowers); the trio recorded as ALT. In 2023, White and Finn collaborated on the album AT.

White's most recent album of new works is Good Luck I Hope You Make It (2024), his first wholly spoken word recording. His current release is The night is approaching though some would say it was morning (2025), a live album recorded on 14 July 2023 in Abbey Road Studio Two, produced by John Leckie and containing performances of songs from all stages of his career.

A book of lyrics and poems, The Music Of What Happens, was published in 1999 by Lagan Press. In 2009, his first work of prose (21st Century Troubadour) was published, also by Lagan, with a second volume of poetry (Stolen Moments) (Another Lost Shark Press, Brisbane) following in 2011. A double CD collection 21st Century Troubadour was released in 2012 to accompany the book of the same name.

After releasing his first two albums through Decca and MCA, a long relationship with UK roots label Cooking Vinyl, and a live performance album for Real World Records/WOMAD, White currently records for ALT Recordings licensed through UK label Floating World Records.

White tours often. He has performed live at Glastonbury Festival, most recently in 2025, and many international rock festivals including WOMAD UK (where he hosted the gala finale in 2005), performing at and MCing the main stage at the Fleadh in London, WOMAD festivals in South Africa, USA, Italy, Cacares, Madrid, Singapore and Womadelaide, international folk festivals including Cambridge (UK); Calgary, Winnipeg, Vancouver (Canada); Port Fairy and Woodford (Australia).

White is best known for songs such as "Religious Persuasion", "James Joyce's Grave", "Street Scenes From My Heart", "Italian Girls on Mopeds", "Another Sunny Day", and noted for the political and literary content of his work.

In 2011, White and Canada-based songwriter Stephen Fearing recorded a collaborative album, Fearing & White, a collection of songs written at infrequent intervals over the course of a decade. The duo released a second album Tea And Confidences in March 2014.

On the 30th anniversary of Rave on Andy White, a career retrospective Studio Albums 1986–2016 was released on Floating World Records, comprising all twelve studio albums in that period. Four subsequent albums have seen White expand his recording practice, with album content reflecting that of his early work.

During the pandemic White maintained a strong online presence and in 2022 started the podcast This podcast is only temporary as a means of discussing his creative practice in replicable terms.

Recent album Good Luck I Hope You Make It is the creative outcome of a practice-based PhD research project undertaken at the University of Tasmania. White was awarded a PhD in August 2024.

White lives in Melbourne with his son, Sebastian, where he lectures at Melbourne Polytechnic and continues to tour the world and release albums on a regular basis.

== Discography ==
- Rave On Andy White (1986, reissued 2018)
- Kiss The Big Stone (1988)
- Himself (1990)
- Out There (1992)
- Destination Beautiful (1994)
- Altitude (under the name ALT with Liam O'Maonlai and Tim Finn) (1995, reissued 2022)
- Teenage (1996)
- Compilation (1998)
- Rare (1999)
- Speechless (2000)
- Andy White (2000)
- Boy 40 (2003)
- Garageband (2006)
- Songwriter (2009)
- Fearing and White (2011) – collaboration with singer-songwriter, Stephen Fearing
- 21st Century Troubadour (2012)
- How Things Are (2014)
- Tea And Confidences (2014) – collaboration with singer-songwriter, Stephen Fearing
- Imaginary Lovers (2016)
- Studio Albums 1986–2016 (2016)
- The Guilty & The Innocent (2017)
- Time is a Buffalo in the Art of War (2019)
- Rarer (2021)
- This garden is only temporary (2022)
- AT (2023) – collaboration with Tim Finn
- Good Luck I Hope You Make It (2024)
- The night is approaching though some would say it was morning (2025)

== Bibliography ==
- The Music Of What Happens (1999)
- 21st Century Troubadour (2009)
- Stolen Moments (2011)
