= Finn Brothers =

New Zealand musical duo

The Finn Brothers
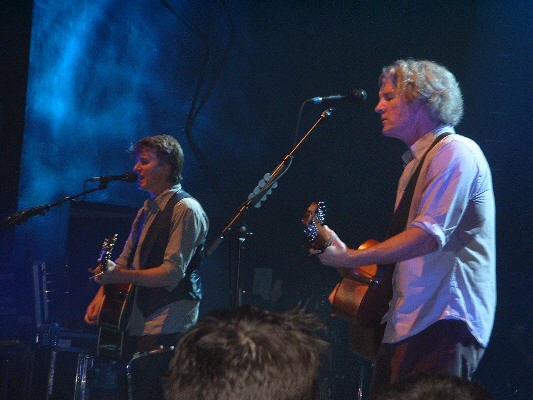

Background information
- Origin: Te Awamutu, Waikato, New Zealand
- Genre: Rock
- Years active: 1989–present
- Labels: Parlophone, Nettwerk, Discovery
- Members: Neil Finn; Tim Finn

The Finn Brothers are a New Zealand musical duo consisting of brothers Neil and Tim Finn. In June 1993 both members were awarded the OBE for their contribution to music.

The two brothers began making music together at a young age; later, when Neil was 18, he was invited to join older brother Tim in Split Enz. Neil would go on to write one of the band's biggest hits, "I Got You". Tim released his first solo album Escapade before leaving Split Enz, and the band folded soon after. Neil started his own group, Crowded House and subsequently recorded two solo albums after Crowded House split in 1996. He reformed Crowded House in 2007, releasing four albums since then. Neil and Tim have also released a series of separate solo albums.

After working on a Finn brothers album with Neil, Tim joined Crowded House for the Woodface album in which they jointly wrote several major hits. Tim toured with Crowded House in 1991 and continued to appear as a guest musician until the band broke up in 1996.

The brothers finally released albums under the Finn Brothers moniker in 1995 and 2004.

== History ==
=== Woodface and Finn ===
Tim and Neil intended to start the Finn brothers project after a three-week song writing spree in 1989. However, most of the songs written during this time were deemed suitable for inclusion on a Crowded House album and they appeared on Woodface, which was released in 1991 and led to Tim joining Crowded House. Many of the original demo recordings from these sessions were subsequently released as B-sides on Finn Brothers singles and recently collected on a vinyl re-release of Finn. Tim left Crowded House while they were touring Europe in support of the Woodface album.

Tim and Neil reconvened in 1995, and the eclectic, lo-fi album which resulted was simply called Finn. In the UK the duo changed both their name and that of the album to Finn Brothers, to avoid confusion with a band going under the moniker Fin. This title was kept for all future collaborations. However re-releases of the original album in Australia and New Zealand still go by the original title Finn.

=== Everyone Is Here ===
Their second album, Everyone Is Here was released in 2004. It was recorded twice, once in upstate New York with producer Tony Visconti, bassist Bones Hillman and Ross Burge on drums, then again six months later in Los Angeles with Crowded House producer Mitchell Froom and different session musicians. Some of the songs from the first recording session were kept as B sides and later appeared on a special edition of the album. The album featured the Split Enz song "Edible Flowers", the inspiration for the music video. The music video features two people in a donkey suit, however its wearers cannot be seen. In the 2005 tour, Neil and Tim Finn wore a donkey suit onto stage for many performances also.

Following the Boxing Day tsunami, The Finn Brothers appeared at the Wave Aid fundraising concert in Sydney to help raise funds for aid organisations working in disaster affected areas. As well as their own material, they performed a cover of Hunters and Collectors' "Throw Your Arms Around Me."

== Television and film ==
Their song, "Anything Can Happen" was used in the first episode of Scrubs' fifth season, My Intern's Eyes. The song was used when we first meet Keith Dudemeister (albeit through his eyes) as he walks into his first day at Sacred Heart.

This song was also used on the final session of the last day of the 2005 England vs. Australia Ashes cricket series on Channel 4 Television, at the end of the last day of cricket being shown on British terrestrial television.

The song "Anything Can Happen" was also featured in movie Aurora Borealis.

Their song "Luckiest Man Alive" was played during the closing credits of the television broadcast of the 2005 Indianapolis 500.

== Discography ==
This discography relates to releases by The Finn Brothers. See Neil Finn's discography, Tim Finn's discography, Crowded House discography and Split Enz discography for other works by the Finn Brothers.

=== Studio albums ===
Year	Title	Peak chart positions					Certifications (sales thresholds)
Year	Title	NZ	AUS	BEL (FL)	NLD	UK	Certifications (sales thresholds)
1995	Finn	8	14	—	—	15	
2004	Everyone Is Here	1	2	27	62	8	ARIA: Gold; BPI: Silver
"—" denotes a recording that did not chart or was not released in that territory.

=== Singles ===
Year	Title	Peak chart positions				Album
Year	Title	NZ	AUS	UK	US AAA	Album
1995	"Suffer Never"	12	70	29	—	Finn
1995	"Angel's Heap"	24	—	41	—	Finn
2004	"Won't Give In"	16	75	26	8	Everyone Is Here
2004	"Nothing Wrong with You"	35	—	31	—	Everyone Is Here
2005	"Anything Can Happen"	—	—	32	—	Everyone Is Here
2005	"Part of Me, Part of You"	18	—	32	—	
"—" denotes a recording that did not chart or was not released in that territory.
