= Tim Finn =

New Zealand musician (born 1952)

Tim Finn OBE
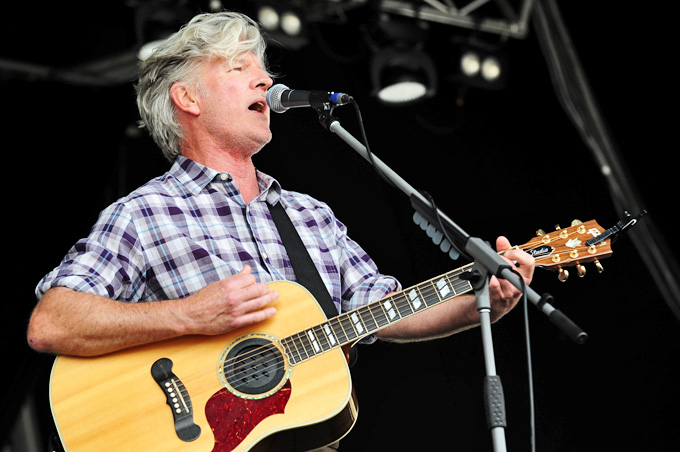
- Finn playing at the Southbound Festival in 2012

Background information
- Born: Brian Timothy Finn; 25 June 1952 (age 74); Te Awamutu, Waikato, New Zealand
- Genres: Pop; new wave; alternative rock; art rock
- Occupations: Musician; singer; songwriter; composer
- Instruments: Vocals; guitar; piano
- Years active: 1972–present
- Labels: Mushroom Records; WEA; Capitol Records; Columbia Records/Sony; EMI Records; Virgin Records; Discovery Records; CRS Records; Periscope Records
- Member of: Forenzics
- Formerly of: Split Enz; Finn Brothers; Crowded House; ALT; Enzso

Brian Timothy Finn (born 25 June 1952) is a New Zealand singer, musician and songwriter. He is best known as a founding member of Split Enz and for his work with his brother Neil, including contributions to Neil's band Crowded House. Finn founded Split Enz in 1972 with Phil Judd, and the two served as the band's co-lead singers and songwriters. Judd's 1977 departure initially left Finn as the sole lead singer and songwriter, though Judd's replacement, Finn's brother Neil, eventually joined Tim as co-lead singer and songwriter. Tim Finn wrote or co-wrote some of the band's best-known songs, including "I See Red", "Dirty Creature", "I Hope I Never" and "Six Months in a Leaky Boat". While still a member of Split Enz, he released his first solo album Escapade in 1983. A commercial success, the album also produced two hit singles with "Fraction Too Much Friction" and "Made My Day". Finn left Split Enz in early 1984, though he briefly returned for the band's farewell tour later that year.

In 1989, Tim joined Neil's post-Split Enz band Crowded House, in time for their third album Woodface. Tim co-wrote the majority of the songs on the album with his brother Neil, including the hits "Four Seasons in One Day", "Weather with You" and "It's Only Natural". Leaving the band in 1991, he reunited with Neil again later in the 1990s under the name Finn Brothers. As well as continuing his solo career, Finn has participated in various collaborations with other artists, including former Split Enz members, and has also composed scores for films and musicals.

Along with his brother, Finn was appointed Officer of the Order of British Empire in 1993 for his services to music.

== Early life and education ==
Brian Timothy Finn was born on 25 June 1952 in Te Awamutu, New Zealand, weighing 10 pounds at birth, to parents Richard and Mary. He has two sisters, and one younger brother, Neil Finn.

At the age of 13, he went to Sacred Heart College, Auckland, a Catholic boarding school, on a scholarship.

== Career ==
=== 1972–1984: Split Enz ===
In 1971 Finn commenced a Bachelor of Arts degree at the University of Auckland. There he played in music practice room 129 (later the name of a Split Enz song) with friends and future Split Enz bandmembers Mike Chunn, Robert Gillies, Philip Judd and Noel Crombie. Music soon became more important to him than his studies. In 1972 he quit university. A few months later, Phil and Tim formed the group Split Ends, renamed Split Enz in 1975, shortly before they left New Zealand for Melbourne. Between 1975 and 1984, the group released nine studio albums. Split Enz played its last show on 4 December 1984 in Auckland.

=== 1981–present: Solo work ===
Finn had his first success away from Split Enz in 1981 when his discarded demo "They Won't Let My Girlfriend Talk to Me" became a top 10 hit for Australian band Jimmy and the Boys. In 1983, Finn recorded his debut solo album, Escapade, while still a member of Split Enz. This met with major commercial success both in Australia and New Zealand, and yielded hit song "Fraction Too Much Friction", which revealed a more rhythm-based sound than Split Enz had been known for. After contributing four songs to Split Enz album Conflicting Emotions, Finn left the band permanently in June 1984, to focus on a solo career.

In 1986 Finn released his second studio album, Big Canoe. The album utilised a wide variety of instrumentation, including guitars, orchestral backings and traditional Indian instruments - most notably on single "No Thunder, No Fire, No Rain", which was inspired by the Bhopal chemical disaster. Though Big Canoe reached number three on the New Zealand charts, it failed to become the international breakthrough that Finn or record company Virgin had hoped.

In 1987, Finn composed music for the Australian comedy Les Patterson Saves the World, which yielded the Australian hit "You Saved the World". Finn had a small part in Australian film The Coca-Cola Kid alongside then-girlfriend Greta Scacchi, and a larger one in her Italian-shot romance La Donna della Luna (The Moon Woman).

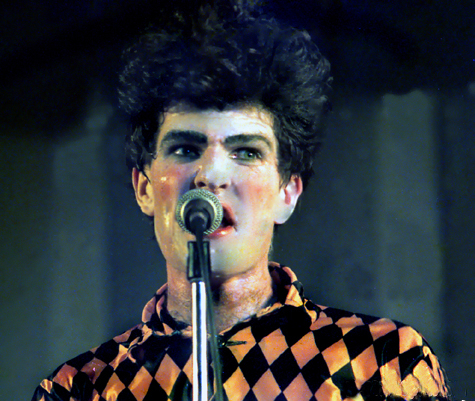
Tim Finn in Split Enz costume

In late 1988, Finn recording his eponymous third album for Capitol Records. The album yielded strong reviews and the New Zealand hit "Parihaka", based on a Māori village known for its campaign of passive resistance to European occupiers. Finn also created the song "Cane Toad Blues" which played during the credits for the documentary film "Cane Toads: An Unnatural History."

In 2000, the album Together in Concert: Live was released, featuring Finn, and fellow New Zealand singer/songwriters Bic Runga, and Dave Dobbyn. Recorded in August and September 2000 in venues around New Zealand, the album saw the three performers each equitably showcased. Both the concerts and album feature all three performers providing vocal and instrumental backing on each other's songs. The album peaked at number 2 on the New Zealand chart.

In 2015, Finn composed further for theatre, with an opera Star Navigator commissioned by New Zealand Opera, Victorian Opera and West Australian Opera, and the musical Ladies in Black to premiere in Brisbane by Queensland Theatre Company in November 2015.

As England and New Zealand went into COVID-19 lockdown in 2020, Finn and Phil Manzanera began working collaboratively on an album Caught by the Heart. The album was released on 26 August 2021. The album is produced by the two of them, with Manzanera doing the lead instrumental and Finn doing the vocals.

=== 1995–2005: Finn Brothers ===
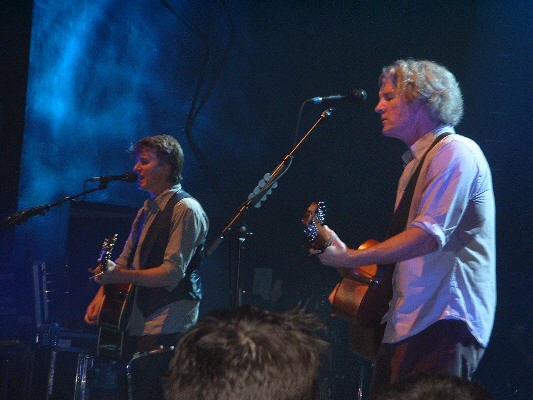
Tim and Neil as the Finn Brothers

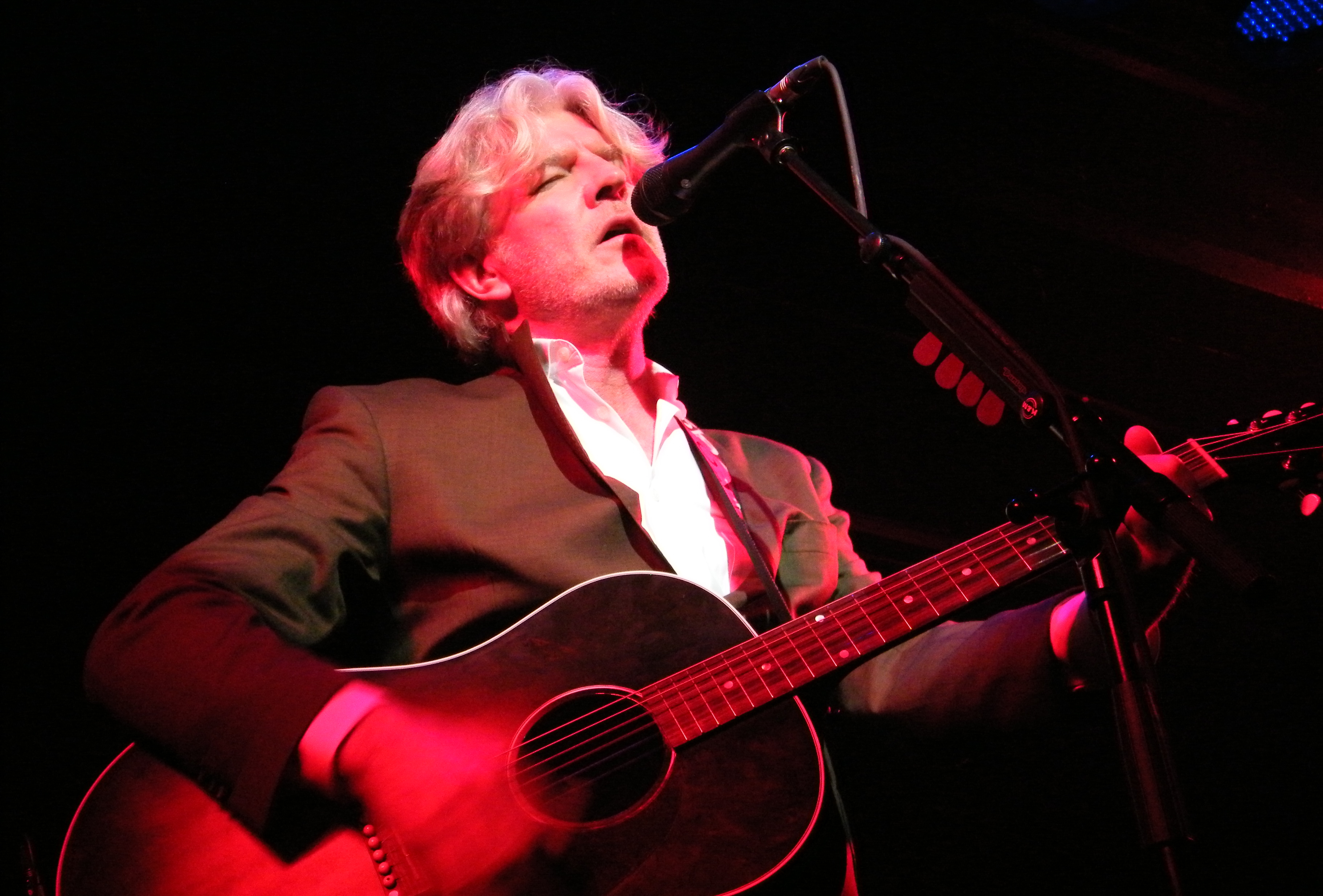
Tim Finn performing in Wellington

In 1989, Finn began playing music with younger brother Neil, for an intended Finn brothers record. After working together on some songs, Neil later proposed incorporating the tracks onto the latest album of Crowded House, the group Neil had formed after Split Enz dissolved. Eight of their songs featured on the resulting Crowded House album "Woodface", including the hits "Weather with You" and "Four Seasons in One Day".

In the 1993 Birthday Honours, both Tim and Neil were appointed Officers of the Order of British Empire, for their services to music.

The Finn Brothers resumed their collaborative work and released Finn in 1995. A second and final album was released in 2004 titled, Everyone Is Here. A Mojo magazine review stated that it contained "some of the most haunting music to bear the Finn imprint".

=== 2020–present: Forenzics, Ihitea ʻAveiʻa ===
In 2020 Finn co-created Forenzics with former Split Enz keyboardist Eddie Rayner. Forenzics is an experimental project with the debut album Shades and Echoes (2022) as a transformation of the songs of Mental Notes. Alongside Finn and Rayner are Noel Crombie and Phil Judd, who were in Split Enz during the recording of the original album - and also Phil Manzanera who was involved in the redevelopment of Mental Notes into Second Thoughts. Initial singles "Chances Are" and "Premiere Fois" were officially released in November 2021, however "Walking", "Strange Stars" and "Abandoned" were all released before on YouTube (from early 2020 until early 2021). In 2021, he collaborated with Tahitian novelist Célestine Hitiura Vaite and Tom Mcleod for an opera based on the life of Tupaia titled Ihitea ʻAveiʻa for New Zealand Opera.

In 2022, Tim Finn involved himself in the Waiata / Anthems project producing a Māori language cover of the track "Six Months in a Leaky Boat" (as "Ono Marama Takerehāia").

== Personal life ==
Finn was briefly married to English dancer Liz Malam from 1981–1982. He was in a relationship with actress Greta Scacchi from 1984–1989. Since 1997 he has been married to television presenter Marie Azcona, formerly of MTV and TVNZ One's Music Week. Finn and Azcona have two children, and have collaborated on several songs, some of which are featured on Steel City, the dance show that Finn wrote. Aside from co-writing two tracks with Azcona, Finn collaborated on another with former Split Enz member Mike Chunn. Finn's son Harper and daughter Elliot are musicians in their own right.

== Discography ==
=== Studio albums ===
List of studio albums, with selected chart positions and certifications
Title	Album details	Peak chart positions					Certifications (sales thresholds)
Title	Album details	NZ	AUS	NED	UK	US	Certifications (sales thresholds)
Escapade	Released: June 1983; Label: Mushroom (ENZ 4); Formats: LP, MC	1	8	10	—	161	
Big Canoe	Released: April 1986; Label: Virgin (V-2369); Formats: LP, MC, CD	3	31	—	—	—	RIANZ: Gold
Tim Finn	Released: April 1989; Label: Capitol (ST748735); Formats: LP, MC, CD	8	47	—	—	—	
Before & After	Released: July 1993; Label: Capitol (7949042); Formats: MC, CD	3	34	72	29	—	
Say It Is So	Released: 1999; Label: Periscope (5243782); Formats: CD	—	—	—	—	—	
Feeding the Gods	Released: June 2001; Label: Periscope, EMI Music (53512523); Formats: CD	27	—	—	—	—	
Imaginary Kingdom	Released: October 2006; Label: Capitol (09463754602 4); Formats: CD	18	48	—	—	—	
The Conversation	Released: November 2008; Label: Capitol (50999 265303 2 1); Formats: CD, digital download	—	—	—	—	—	
The View Is Worth the Climb	Released: August 2011; Label: ABC Music / UMA (2779444); Formats: CD, digital download	28	—	—	—	—	
Caught by the Heart (with Phil Manzanera)	Released: 2021; Label: Expression (EXPCD41); Formats: CD, DD	—	—	—	—	—	

=== Live albums ===
List of compilation albums, with selected chart positions
Title	Album details	Peak chart positions	Certification
Title	Album details	NZ	Certification
Together in Concert: Live (with Dave Dobbyn and Bic Runga)	Released: November 2000; Label: Epic (5011402000); Formats: CD	2	RIANZ: 3× Platinum

=== Soundtrack albums ===
Title	Details
The Les Patterson Long Player	Released: 1987; Label: WEA (254779-1); Format: LP
Steel City	Released: 1998; Label: Sony (491582.2); Format: CD

=== Spoken word albums ===
List of spoken word albums, with selected details
Title	Album details
The Magnificent Nose (with Anna Paquin)	Released: 1994; Label: BMG (74321237022); Formats: CD

=== Compilation albums ===
List of compilation albums, with selected chart positions
Title	Album details	Peak chart positions	
Title	Album details	NZ	AUS
North, South, East, West...Anthology	Released: September 2009; Label: Capitol (509993095822 7); Formats: CD, DD	15	79

=== Singles ===
List of singles, with selected peak chart positions
Title	Year	Peak chart positions				Album
Title	Year	NZ	AUS	CAN	UK	Album
"Fraction Too Much Friction"	1983	2	8	—	—	Escapade
"Made My Day"	1983	—	22	—	—	Escapade
"Through the Years"	1983	—	34	34	—	Escapade
"Staring at the Embers"	1983	—	34	—	—	Escapade
"In a Minor Key"	1984	—	—	—	—	Escapade
"Home for My Heart"	1985	—	87	—	—	Coca-Cola Kid (soundtrack)
"No Thunder, No Fire, No Rain"	1986	24	46	—	—	Big Canoe
"Spiritual Hunger"	1986	—	—	—	—	Big Canoe
"Carve You in Marble"	1986	33	—	—	92	Big Canoe
"You Saved the World"	1987	—	—	—	—	Les Patterson Saves the World
"With You I'm Alive"	1987	—	—	—	—	Les Patterson Saves the World
"How'm I Gonna Sleep"	1989	2	27	77	—	Tim Finn
"Parihaka" (with Herbs)	1989	6	—	—	—	Tim Finn
"Crescendo"	1989	—	120	—	—	Tim Finn
"Not Even Close"	1990	—	124	91	—	Tim Finn
"Long Hard Road" (with Phil Judd)	1990	—	—	—	—	The Big Steal (soundtrack)
"Islands" (with MC Fli T)	1992	—	—	—	—	Non-album single
"Persuasion"	1993	6	62	—	43	Before & After
"Hit the Ground Running"	1993	14	115	—	50	Before & After
"Many's the Time"	1994	—	—	—	—	Before & After
"Runs in the Family" (with The Record Partnership)	1994	9	—	—	—	Non-album single
"Steel City"	1998	—	—	—	—	Steel City Soundtrack
"Twinkle"	1999	—	—	—	—	Say It Is So
"What You've Done"	2001	48	194	—	—	Feeding the Gods
"Couldn't Be Done"	2006	—	105	—	—	Imaginary Kingdom
"Horizon"	2007	—	—	—	—	Imaginary Kingdom
"Out of This World"	2008	—	—	—	—	The Conversation
"Caught by the Heart"	2021	—	—	—	—	Caught by the Heart

=== Charity singles ===
Year	Song	Peak chart positions	Notes
Year	Song	NZ	Notes
1986	"Sailing Away" (as All of Us)	1	To help raise money and support for New Zealand's 1986–7 America's Cup campaign

- This discography relates to releases by Tim Finn only. See also Finn Brothers' discography, Crowded House discography and Split Enz discography for other related works.

== Awards ==
=== RIANZ Awards ===
The New Zealand Music Awards are awarded annually by the RIANZ in New Zealand.

Year	Award	Work	With	Result
1984	International Achievement		solo	Won
1984	International Achievement		Split Enz	Nominated
1989	Best Male Vocalist		solo	Won
1989	Best Songwriter	"Parihaka"	solo	Won
1992	Best Songwriter	"It's Only Natural"	with Neil Finn	Nominated
1996	Album of the Year	Finn	Finn Brothers	Nominated
1996	Best Group		Finn Brothers	Nominated
1996	International Achievement		Finn Brothers	Nominated
2001	Album of the Year	Together in Concert: Live	with Dave Dobbyn & Bic Runga	Nominated
2005	Album of the Year	Everyone Is Here	Finn Brothers	Nominated
2005	Single of the Year	"Won't Give In"	Finn Brothers	Nominated
2005	International Achievement Award	Everyone Is Here	Finn Brothers	Won
2007	Best Male Solo Artist	Imaginary Kingdom	solo	Won

=== ARIA Awards ===
The ARIA Music Awards are awarded annually by the Australian Recording Industry Association.

Year	Award	Work	With	Result
1987	Best Male Artist	Big Canoe	solo	Nominated
1987	Highest Selling Album	Big Canoe	solo	Nominated
1993	Song of the Year	"Weather With You"	with Neil Finn (for Crowded House)	Nominated
1994	Best Male Artist	Before and After	solo	Nominated
1994	Song of the Year	"Persuasion"	solo	Nominated
1996	Song of the Year	"Suffer Never"	with Neil Finn (for The Finn Brothers)	Nominated

=== Countdown Australian Music Awards ===
Countdown was an Australian pop music TV series on national broadcaster ABC-TV from 1974 to 1987, it presented music awards from 1979 to 1987, initially in conjunction with magazine TV Week. The TV Week / Countdown Awards were a combination of popular-voted and peer-voted awards.

Year	Nominee / work	Award	Result
1981	himself	Best Australian Songwriter	Nominated
1982	himself	Best Australian Songwriter	Won
1983	Escapade	Best Australian Album	Won
1983	"Fraction too Much Friction"	Best Australian Single	Nominated
1983	"Fraction too Much Friction"	Best Video	Won
1983	himself	Songwriter of the Year	Won
1983	himself	Most Popular Male Performer	Won
1984	himself	Most Popular Male Performer	Nominated
1985	himself	Most Popular Male Performer	Won

=== Helpmann Awards ===
The Helpmann Awards for live performance in Australia are awarded annually by Live Performance Australia.

Year	Award	Work	With	Result
2016	Best New Australian Work	Ladies in Black	Carolyn Burns and Tim Finn with Simon Phillips	Won
2016	Best Original Score	Ladies in Black	solo	Nominated
