= Crowded House discography =

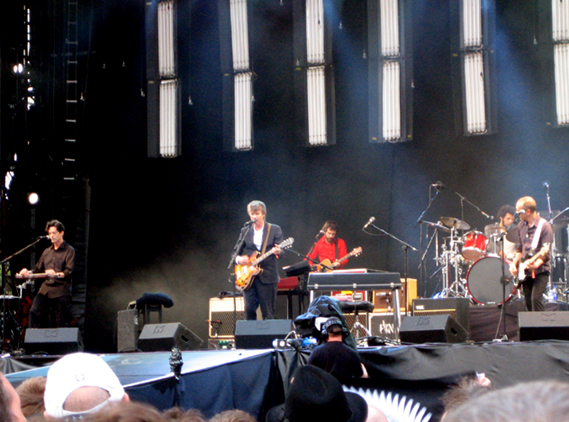
- Crowded House performing at Hyde Park in 2007.
- Studio albums: 8
- Extended plays: 1
- Soundtrack albums: 1
- Live albums: 6
- Compilation albums: 7
- Tribute albums: 1
- Singles: 40
- Video albums: 7
- Music videos: 40

This is a discography for the rock band Crowded House. As of 2024 Crowded House have sold over 15 million albums worldwide.

== Albums ==
=== Studio albums ===
List of studio albums, with selected chart positions and certifications
Year	Album details	Peak chart positions										Certifications (sales thresholds)
Year	Album details	AUS	CAN	GER	JPN	NED	NOR	NZ	SWI	UK	US	Certifications (sales thresholds)
1986	Crowded House: Released: August 1986; Label: Capitol	1	8	44	46	20	—	3	—	99	12	ARIA: 6× Platinum; BPI: Silver; MC: Platinum; RIAA: Platinum
1988	Temple of Low Men: Released: 5 July 1988; Label: Capitol	1	10	57	75	49	—	2	—	138	40	ARIA: 3× Platinum; BPI: Silver; MC: Platinum; RMNZ: Platinum
1991	Woodface: Released: 2 July 1991; Label: Capitol	2	20	26	—	12	13	1	12	6	83	ARIA: Platinum; BPI: 2× Platinum; MC: Gold; RMNZ: Platinum
1993	Together Alone: Released: 11 October 1993; Label: Capitol	2	18	55	89	19	14	1	—	4	73	ARIA: Platinum; BPI: Platinum; MC: Gold
2007	Time on Earth: Released: 29 June 2007; Label: Parlophone/ EMI	1	38	95	—	12	27	2	89	3	46	ARIA: Platinum; BPI: Silver; RMNZ: Gold
2010	Intriguer: Released: 11 June 2010; Label: Fantasy / Universal	1	—	79	—	31	32	3	—	12	50	ARIA: Gold
2021	Dreamers Are Waiting: Released: 4 June 2021; Label: EMI, Universal, BMG	2	—	16	—	12	—	2	27	6	—	
2024	Gravity Stairs: Released: 31 May 2024; Label: Lester, BMG	3	—	—	—	—	—	4	—	8	—	
"—" denotes a recording that did not chart or was not released in that territory.

=== Live albums ===
List of live albums, with selected chart positions
Year	Album details	Peak chart positions		Certifications
Year	Album details	AUS	UK	Certifications
2006	Farewell to the World: Released: November 2006; Label: Capitol	43	120	ARIA: Gold
2007	Live On Earth^{[A]}: Released: December 2007 (UK only); Label: Concert Live, Parlophone	—	—	
2011	North America Travelogue 2010^{[B]}: Released: April 2011 (US only); Label: KUFALA Recordings	—	—	
2011	Intriguer Live – Start to Finish^{[C]}: Released: November 2011 (US only); Label: KUFALA Recordings	—	—	
2020	Live 92–94: Part 1: Released: December 2020; Label: The Desk Tape Series	—	—	
2021	Live 92–94: Part 2: Released: January 2021; Label: The Desk Tape Series	—	—	
"—" denotes a recording that did not chart or was not released in that territory.

Notes:

- A Live On Earth was recorded and released in five cities across the United Kingdom. The five albums received a limited release in the United Kingdom
- B North America Travelogue 2010 received a limited release in April 2011 for Record Store Day.
- C Intriguer Live – Start to Finish received a limited release in November 2011 for Black Friday Record Store Day.

In addition the above, KUFALA Recordings released numerous limited edition Crowded House recordings on CDr, recorded across USA and Canada in 2007 and 2010.

=== Compilation albums ===
List of compilation albums, with selected chart positions and certifications
Year	Album details	Peak chart positions										Certifications (sales thresholds)
Year	Album details	AUS	BEL (FL)	CAN	GER	IRE	NED	NOR	NZ	SWI	UK	Certifications (sales thresholds)
1996	Recurring Dream: The Very Best of Crowded House: Released: 24 June 1996; Label: Capitol	1	4	12	57	52	10	5	1	17	1	ARIA: 13× Platinum; BPI: 4× Platinum; IFPI: 2× Platinum; MC: Gold; RMNZ: Platinum
1999	Afterglow: Released: May 1999; Label: Capitol	36	—	98	—	23	—	—	30	—	18	ARIA: Gold
2003	Classic Masters: Released: June 2003 (US only); Label: Capitol	—	—	—	—	—	—	—	—	—	—	
2003	The Essential / Essential: Released: 2003; Label: EMI / Capitol; Re-issued in 2011	—	—	—	—	—	—	—	—	—	—	
2007	Platinum Crowded House: Released: 2007; Label: EMI / Capitol	—	—	—	—	—	—	—	—	—	—	
2010	The Very Very Best of Crowded House: Released: 22 October 2010; Label: Capitol / EMI	5	—	—	—	—	—	—	12	—	49	ARIA: 4× Platinum; BPI: Gold
2012	All the Best / Gold: Released: 2012; Label: EMI / Universal	—	—	—	—	—	—	—	—	—	—	
"—" denotes a recording that did not chart or was not released in that territory.

=== Limited live / self-released albums ===
Between 1996 and 2002, Crowded House self-released limited number of live albums.

List of limited, live, self released albums
1996	Marcia, Marcia, Marcia! Live, Los Angeles 06/04/89: Released: 1996; Label: Frenz of the Enz; Recorded on 6 April 1989 at the Pantages Theatre in Hollywood, US
1996	Bent in Gent 18/10/91: Released: 1996; Label: Frenz of the Enz; Recorded on 18 October 1991 at Vooruit, Gent, Belgium
1996	Newcastle Jam: Released: 1996; Label: Frenz of the Enz; Note: Recorded 20 March 1992, Civic Theatre, Newcastle, Australia
1996	Paul Is Dead: Released: 1996; Label: Frenz of the Enz; Note: Recorded 14 April 1994, at Roxy Theatre, Atlanta, US
1997	Live on the Roof Top: Released: 1997; Label: Frenz of the Enz; Note: Recorded 22 January 1987, Live on the Roof Top Melbourne, Australia
1997	State of Mind: Released: 1997; Label: Frenz of the Enz; Note: Recorded 25 August 1988 at Sydney State Theatre, Australia
1997	Detroit Rock City: Released: 1997; Label: Frenz of the Enz; Note: Recorded 20 September 1991 at Detroit State Theatre, US
1997	Nick's Birthday Party: Released: 1997; Label: Frenz of the Enz; Note: Recorded 9 December 1991 at New Daisy Theatre, Memphis, US
1997	In the Raw: Released: 1997; Label: Frenz of the Enz; Note: Recorded: 12 December 1991 at Back Alley, Houston, US
1997	Graduation (Leeds University): Released: 1997; Label: Frenz of the Enz; Note: Recorded 28 February 1992, University of Leeds, United Kingdom
1997	Hometown: Released: 1997; Label: Frenz of the Enz; Note: Recorded 26 March 1992, the Palais Theatre, Melbourne, Australia
1997	Nick the Stripper: Released: 1997; Label: Frenz of the Enz; Note: Recorded 20 June 1992 at Royal Court Theatre Liverpool, United Kingdom
1997	One Night Stand: Released: 1997; Label: Frenz of the Enz; Note: Recorded 24 June 1992 at Wembley Arena, London, United Kingdom
1997	Foreplay: Released: 1997; Label: Frenz of the Enz; Note: Recorded 17 July 1992 at National Stadium, Dublin, Ireland
1997	Dutch Treat: Released: 1997; Label: Frenz of the Enz; Note: Recorded 2 December 1992 at Utrecht, Muziekcentrum, Netherlands
1997	Manchester Split: Released: 1997; Label: Frenz of the Enz; Note: Recorded 21 and 22 November 1993 at Apollo-Manchester, UK
1997	Worst Kept Secret: Released: 1997; Label: Frenz of the Enz; Note: Recorded 20 November 1996 at Corner Hotel, Melbourne, Australia
1997	Spooky Vibrations: Released: 1997; Label: Frenz of the Enz; Note: Recorded between 1991 and 1997 at various places
1998	Homebrew: Released: 1998; Label: Frenz of the Enz; Note: Recorded between 1991 and 1994 at various places
1998	Exit Stage Left: Released: 1998; Label: Frenz of the Enz; Note: Recorded 21 November 1996 at The Corner Hotel Melbourne, Australia
1999	Back On the Bus: Released: 1999; Label: Frenz of the Enz; Note: Recorded between 1992 and 1993 at various places
1999	Live At CBGB: Released: 1999; Label: Frenz of the Enz; Note: Recorded 22 November 1986 at CBCG, New York, US
1999	Acoustically Live: Released: 1999; Label: Frenz of the Enz; Note: Recorded between 1990 and 1994 in Australia and US
2000	Ghost Cars: Released: 2000; Label: Frenz of the Enz; Note: Recorded between 1991 and 1994 at various places
2002	Taxi: Released: 2002; Label: Frenz of the Enz; Note: Recorded 25 September 1991 at Saint-Denis Theatre, Montreal, Canada
2002	Buffalo '91: Released: 2002; Label: Frenz of the Enz; Note: Recorded December 1991 at Buffalo, US
2002	Live in Berlin: Released: 2002; Label: Frenz of the Enz; Note: Recorded 8 December 1993 at Huxleys, Berlin, Germany
2002	Live At the Warfield: Released: 2002; Label: Frenz of the Enz; Note: Recorded 23 March 1994 at The Warfield Theatre, San Francisco

== Singles ==
Year	Title	Peak chart positions										Certifications	Album
Year	Title	AUS	CAN	GER	IRE	NED	NZ	UK	US	US Alt	US Main Rock	Certifications	Album
1986	"Mean to Me"	26	—	—	—	—	—	—	—	—	—	ARIA: Platinum	Crowded House
1986	"World Where You Live"	43	—	—	—	76	—	123	65	—	45	ARIA: Gold	Crowded House
1986	"Now We're Getting Somewhere"^{[D]}	63	—	—	—	—	33	—	—	—	—	ARIA: Gold	Crowded House
1986	"Don't Dream It's Over"	8	1	13	19	7	1	27	2	—	11	ARIA: 9× Platinum; BPI: Platinum; RMNZ: 8× Platinum	Crowded House
1987	"Something So Strong"	18	10	—	—	—	3	95	7	—	10	ARIA: 2× Platinum; RMNZ: Platinum	Crowded House
1988	"Better Be Home Soon"	2	8	59	—	31	2	101	42	29	18	ARIA: 5× Platinum; RMNZ: 2× Platinum	Temple of Low Men
1988	"When You Come"	27	—	—	—	—	—	—	—	—	—		Temple of Low Men
1988	"Into Temptation"	59	64	—	—	20	38	—	—	—	—		Temple of Low Men
1988	"Never Be the Same"^{[E]}	—	—	—	—	—	—	—	—	—	45		Temple of Low Men
1989	"Sister Madly"	66	92	—	—	—	26	138	—	—	—		Temple of Low Men
1990	"I Feel Possessed"	93	49	—	—	—	—	—	—	—	—		Temple of Low Men
1991	"Chocolate Cake"	20	9	—	—	27	7	69	—	2	—		Woodface
1991	"Fall at Your Feet"	31	24	—	21	41	24	17	75	—	—	ARIA: 3× Platinum; BPI: Silver; RMNZ: 2× Platinum	Woodface
1991	"It's Only Natural"	15	55	59	—	55	31	24	—	5	—	ARIA: Platinum; RMNZ: Gold	Woodface
1992	"Weather with You"	27	34	23	19	10	9	7	—	—	—	ARIA: 4× Platinum; RMNZ: 4× Platinum; BPI: Gold	Woodface
1992	"Four Seasons in One Day"	47	68	—	—	50	33	26	—	—	—	ARIA: Gold; RMNZ: Gold	Woodface
1993	"Distant Sun"	23	4	70	—	—	5	19	113	26	—	ARIA: Platinum; RMNZ: Platinum	Together Alone
1994	"Nails in My Feet"	34	—	—	—	—	11	22	—	—	—		Together Alone
1994	"Locked Out"	79	81	—	—	—	—	12	120	8	—		Together Alone
1994	"Fingers of Love"	—	—	—	—	—	—	27	—	—	—		Together Alone
1994	"Pineapple Head"	—	—	—	—	—	50	27	—	—	—		Together Alone
1994	"Private Universe"	46	—	—	—	—	—	—	—	—	—		Together Alone
1995	"Together Alone"	—	—	—	—	—	37	—	—	—	—		Together Alone
1996	"Everything Is Good for You"	10	—	—	—	—	—	—	—	—	—		Recurring Dream
1996	"Instinct"	90	68	—	—	—	17	12	—	—	—		Recurring Dream
1996	"Not the Girl You Think You Are"	37	—	—	—	—	41	20	—	—	—		Recurring Dream
1996	"Don't Dream It's Over" (re-release)	—	—	—	—	—	—	25	—	—	—		Recurring Dream
2007	"Don't Stop Now"	34	—	—	—	—	—	41	—	—	—		Time on Earth
2007	"She Called Up"	—	—	—	—	—	—	156	—	—	—		Time on Earth
2007	"Pour Le Monde"	—	—	—	—	—	—	51	—	—	—		Time on Earth
2010	"Saturday Sun"	—	—	—	—	—	—	—	—	—	—		Intriguer
2010	"Either Side of the World"	—	—	—	—	—	—	—	—	—	—		Intriguer
2016	"Better Be Home Soon/Fall at Your Feet/Distant Sun (Medley)" (with Missy Higgins and Bernard Fanning)	53	—	—	—	—	—	—	—	—	—		Non-album single
2020	"Whatever You Want"	—	—	—	—	—	—	—	—	—	—		Dreamers Are Waiting
2021	"To the Island"	—	—	—	—	—	—^{[F]}	—	—	—	—		Dreamers Are Waiting
2021	"Playing with Fire"	—	—	—	—	—	—	—	—	—	—		Dreamers Are Waiting
2024	"Oh Hi"	—	—	—	—	—	—	—	—	—	—		Gravity Stairs
2024	"Teenage Summer"	—	—	—	—	—	—	—	—	—	—		Gravity Stairs
2024	"The Howl"	—	—	—	—	—	—^{[G]}	—	—	—	—		Gravity Stairs
"—" denotes items which were not released in that country or failed to chart.

Notes:

- D "Now We're Getting Somewhere" was released in New Zealand after "Don't Dream It's Over" and "Something So Strong" in 1987.
- E "Never Be the Same" charted on US Mainstream Rock Tracks due to radio airplay; it was not released as a proper single in the US.
- F "To the Island" (Tame Impala Remix) did not enter the NZ Top 40 Singles Chart, but peaked at number 36 on the NZ Hot Singles Chart.
- G "The Howl" did not enter the NZ Top 40 Singles Chart, but peaked at number 32 on the NZ Hot Singles Chart.

== Other charted songs ==
Year	Title	Peak chart positions		Album
Year	Title	NZ Hot	UK	Album
2015	"Help Is Coming"	—	88	Afterglow
2024	"Magic Piano"	40	—	Gravity Stairs

== Other appearances ==
List of other non-single song appearances
Title	Year	Album
"Many Rivers to Cross" (live) (with Jimmy Barnes)	1989	"Last Frontier" (single)
"Tall Trees" (live)	1992	Triple J - Live at The Wireless Volume 2
"Fall At Your Feet" & "It's Only Natural (unplugged)	1993	Triple M Cordless
"Christmas Message"	1993	Santa Claus, Schmanta Claus (Kevin and Bean)
"World Where You Live" (live)	1994	KFOG 104.5 "Live from the Archives"
"Hope Is Coming"	1999	Liberdade - Viva East Timor
"Mr. Tambourine Man" (with Roger McGuinn) (live), "Eight Miles High" (with Roger McGuinn) (live), "Throw Your Arms Around Me") (live), "One Step Ahead" (live), "History Never Repeats" (with Pearl Jam) (live)	1999	Other Enz: Split Enz & Beyond
"It's Only Natural"	2000	Top of the Pops 2
"My Legs Are Gone"	2001	I Like It Rare
"Weather with You" (acoustic)	2006	The Acoustic Album
"Better Be Home Soon" (live)	2007	Live Earth: The Concerts for a Climate in Crisis
"Everybody's Talkin'" (Like a Version)	2008	Triple J Like a Version 4
"Don’t Dream It’s Over" (live)	2020	Music from the Home Front

== Crowded House song covers ==
- In 1991, Antonello Venditti re-arranged the song "Don't Dream It's Over", writing new lyrics instead of translating the original song, and naming it "Alta marea", on the album Benvenuti in paradiso.
- In 1991, British performer Paul Young covered "Don't Dream It's Over" as a duet with Paul Carrack.
- In 1996, Belinda Carlisle covered "She Goes On" as "He Goes On" on her album A Woman and a Man.
- In 1997, British punk band China Drum covered "Fall at Your Feet" on their album Fiction of Life 2.
- In 1999, Australian Aboriginal singer Jimmy Little recorded a cover version of "Into Temptation" for a rock-indie covers album entitled Messenger.
- In 2000, Nuevo Flamenco musician Jesse Cook closed the album Free Fall with a cover of "Fall at Your Feet".
- In 2000, Belgian band Clouseau released a single of their cover of "Weather with You".
- In 2002, Sixpence None the Richer covered "Don't Dream It's Over" for their 2002 album Divine Discontent.
- In 2004, Busted performed a cover version of "Fall at Your Feet" as a B-side to the single "Who's David?"
- In 2005, She Will Have Her Way, a cover album by a variety of female artists, was released featuring versions of Neil and Tim Finn songs from Crowded House, Split Enz, and the brothers' solo careers. A limited edition has a second disc which contains the original versions of the tracks. The Crowded House tracks included are:
  - "Better Be Home Soon" by Kasey Chambers
  - "Distant Sun" by Brooke Fraser
  - "Don't Dream It's Over" by Sarah Blasko
  - "Fall at Your Feet" by Clare Bowditch
  - "Four Seasons" by New Buffalo (originally "Four Seasons in One Day")
  - "Into Temptation" by Renée Geyer
  - "Not the Girl You Think You Are" by Holly Throsby
  - "Pineapple Head" by Natalie Imbruglia
- In 2005, James Blunt performed a cover version of "Fall at Your Feet" as a B-side to the single "You're Beautiful".
- In 2005, Howie Day performed a cover of "Don't Dream It's Over" for his live album Live From....
- In 2005, Patrizio Buanne covered the song "Alta Marea" by Antonello Venditti, which is a re-arrangement of the song "Don't Dream It's Over" with different lyrics, for his debut album The Italian.
- In 2006, Jimmy Buffett covered "Weather with You" for his album, Take the Weather with You.
- In 2006, Teddy Thompson covered "Don't Dream it's Over" for the compilation album, Q Covered: The Eighties.
- In 2008, Melbourne band The Resignators covered "Now We're Getting Somewhere" on their album Time Decays.

== Covers performed by Crowded House ==
Crowded House themselves frequently perform a version of the Hunters and Collectors' "Throw Your Arms Around Me" and Paul Kelly's "Leaps and Bounds" during their live sets (including at the ARIA Music Awards of 1997 ceremony, inducting Kelly into the Hall of Fame). Their version of The Zombies' "She's Not There" was used on the soundtrack of The Crossing, a 1990 film starring Russell Crowe. In addition to these, the group often would perform The Beatles' "Rocky Raccoon", among many other Beatles songs. The group would also often perform Irish folk traditional piece "The Parting Glass". As the group rose from the ashes of Split Enz, they often performed various Split Enz songs, in particular "This Is Massive" because it was written by Paul Hester for Split Enz's last album, the only studio album he performed on.

== Videography ==
=== Video albums ===
Year	Album details	Peak chart positions		Certifications (sales thresholds)
Year	Album details	AUS DVD	UK Video Charts	Certifications (sales thresholds)
1987	Spring Break '87: Released: July 1987; Label: MTV	—N/a	—N/a	
1992	I Like to Watch: Released: 1992; Label: Picture Music International	—N/a	14	
1996	Farewell to the World^{[#]}: Released: 1996; Label: Polygram Video	1	3	ARIA: 3× Platinum
2002	Dreaming: The Videos: Released: 2002; Label: Capitol Records	1	49	ARIA: 2× Platinum
2003	Live at the Corner: Released: 2003; Label: Friends of the Enz			
2007	Woodface (The Story Behind The Album): Released: 2007; Label: Madman			

Notes:

  1. Farewell to the World was released on VHS and re-released on DVD in 2006.

=== Music videos ===
Year	Title	Album
1986	"Mean to Me"	Crowded House
1986	"World Where You Live"	Crowded House
1986	"Now We're Getting Somewhere"	Crowded House
1986	"Don't Dream It's Over"	Crowded House
1987	"Something So Strong"	Crowded House
1988	"Better Be Home Soon"	Temple of Low Men
1988	"When You Come"	Temple of Low Men
1988	"Into Temptation"	Temple of Low Men
1989	"I Feel Possessed"	Temple of Low Men
1991	"Chocolate Cake"	Woodface
1991	"Fall at Your Feet"	Woodface
1991	"It's Only Natural"	Woodface
1992	"Weather with You"	Woodface
1992	"Four Seasons in One Day"	Woodface
1993	"Distant Sun"	Together Alone
1993	"Nails in My Feet"	Together Alone
1993	"Locked Out"	Together Alone
1994	"Private Universe"	Together Alone
1996	"Instinct"	Recurring Dream
1996	"Not the Girl You Think You Are"	Recurring Dream
2007	"Don't Stop Now"	Time on Earth
2007	"She Called Up"	Time on Earth
2010	"Saturday Sun"	Intriguer
2010	"Either Side of the World" (2 versions)	Intriguer
2010	"Twice If You're Lucky"	Intriguer
2020	"Whatever You Want"	Dreamers Are Waiting
2020	"To the Island"	Dreamers Are Waiting
2021	"To the Island" (Eddie & Elsie edition)	Dreamers Are Waiting
2021	"To the Island" (Tame Impala remix)	Dreamers Are Waiting
2021	"Playing with Fire"	Dreamers Are Waiting
2021	"Show Me the Way" (lyric video)	Dreamers Are Waiting
2021	"Love Isn't Hard at All"	Dreamers Are Waiting
2021	"Sweet Tooth"	Dreamers Are Waiting
2022	"Bad Times Good" (lyric video)	Dreamers Are Waiting
2023	"Oh Hi"	Gravity Stairs
2024	"Oh Hi x So They Can" (charity video)	Gravity Stairs
2024	"Teenage Summer"	Gravity Stairs
2024	"The Howl"	Gravity Stairs
2024	"Some Greater Plan (For Claire)"	Gravity Stairs
