= List of awards and nominations received by Crowded House =

Crowded House awards and nominations
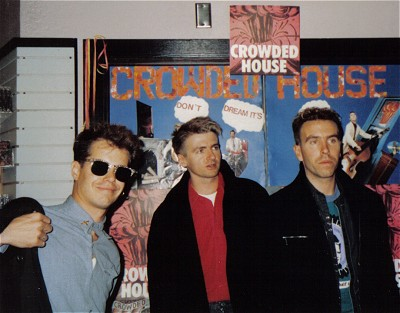
- Crowded House in San Francisco, California, 1987. L to R: Paul Hester, Neil Finn, Nick Seymour
Awards and nominations
Award	Wins	Nominations
APRA	8	11
ARIA	13	40
Brit	1	1
Juno	0	2
MTV VMA	1	4
New Zealand	3	5
Q	2	2
BMI Awards	2	2
Helpmann Awards	1	1
The Age EG Awards	1	1
Triple J Hottest 100	3	

Totals (Note: Certain award groups do not simply award one winner. They acknowledge several different recipients, have runners-up, and have third place. Since this is a specific recognition and is different from losing an award, runner-up mentions are considered wins in this award tally. For simplification and to avoid errors, each award in this list has been presumed to have had a prior nomination.)
- Wins: 31
- Nominations: 68

Crowded House is a rock band that was formed in Melbourne, Australia, in 1985. They were founded by Neil Finn and Paul Hester of the New Zealand group Split Enz. Most Split Enz fans shifted their allegiance to the new group, so Crowded House had an established fan base before they had recorded any material. The band has released eight studio albums: Crowded House (1986), Temple of Low Men (1988), Woodface (1991), Together Alone (1993), Time on Earth (2007) and Intriguer (2010), Dreamers Are Waiting (2021), and Gravity Stairs (2024) . The band dissolved in 1996, and reformed in 2007. Crowded House has won awards both nationally and internationally, including twelve ARIA Music Awards from the Australian Recording Industry Association, and eight APRA Awards from the Australasian Performing Right Association. APRA also listed their track, "Don't Dream It's Over," as the seventh best Australian song of all time in May 2001.

Crowded House has performed in several venues, and have become well known among both fans and the music industry both for their music and the skill of the individual members. Their most awarded work is "Don't Dream It's Over" (1986), from their debut album. The song has earned two ARIA Music Awards, three APRA Awards, a BMI Award, and an MTV Music Video Award. In 1998 it was placed 76th on the Triple J Hottest 100 of All Time. They have also had two other songs in annual Hottest 100 lists of best songs from a year. Crowded House won the BRIT Award for Best International Group in 1994.

Crowded House has won twelve trophies from 35 nominations since the ARIA Music Awards were first presented in 1987, including being the first winners of the Best New Talent and Song of the Year categories in that year. The group's success has been across several categories; they received their most nominations (eight) in the Best Group category, winning in 1988 and 1993. Eight of their ARIA Awards were from their first two albums, Crowded House and Temple of Low Men, with the line-up of Finn, Hester and Nick Seymour. Crowded House has won eight APRA Awards in various categories, including three wins in "most-performed" categories from various genres and three wins for either the Gold Award (for best song of the year) or Song of the Year (category renamed from 1991).

The New Zealand Music Awards have been conferred annually since 1965 by Recorded Music NZ. Crowded House has received five nominations, primarily in the category of International Achievement, winning in 1992, 1994 and 1995.

== Australian Record Industry Association (ARIA) Awards ==
Year	Nominated work	Award	Result	Ref.
1987	Crowded House	Best New Talent	Won	
1987	Crowded House	Album of the Year	Nominated	
1987	"Don't Dream It's Over"	Song of the Year	Won	
1987	"Don't Dream It's Over"	Single of the Year	Nominated	
1987	"Don't Dream It's Over"	Best Group	Nominated	
1987	"Don't Dream It's Over" – Alex Proyas	Best Video	Won	
1987	Crowded House – Nick Seymour	Best Cover Artist	Nominated	
1988	Crowded House	Best Group	Won	
1989	Temple of Low Men	Album of the Year	Won	
1989	Temple of Low Men	Best Adult Contemporary Album	Won	
1989	Temple of Low Men	Best Cover Art	Won	
1989	Temple of Low Men	Best Group	Nominated	
1989	Temple of Low Men	Highest Selling Album	Nominated	
1989	"Better Be Home Soon"	Song of the Year	Won	
1989	"Better Be Home Soon"	Single of the Year	Nominated	
1989	"Better Be Home Soon"	Highest Selling Single	Nominated	
1989	"When You Come" – Paul Elliot	Best Video	Nominated	
1992	Woodface	Album of the Year	Nominated	
1992	Woodface	Best Group	Nominated	
1992	Woodface	Best Cover Art	Nominated	
1992	Woodface	Highest Selling Album	Nominated	
1992	"Fall At Your Feet" - Neil Finn	Song of the Year	Nominated	
1992	"Chocolate Cake" – Paul Kosky	Engineer of the Year	Nominated	
1992	"Chocolate Cake" – John Hillcoat	Best Video	Won	
1993	"Weather with You"	Single of the Year	Nominated	
1993	"Weather with You"	Best Group	Won	
1993	"Weather with You"	Song of the Year	Nominated	
1994	Together Alone	Album of the Year	Nominated	
1994	Together Alone	Best Group	Nominated	
1994	Together Alone – Nick Seymour	Best Cover Art	Nominated	
1994	"Distant Sun"	Single of the Year	Nominated	
1994	"Distant Sun" - Neil Finn	Song of the Year	Nominated	
1995	"Private Universe"	Best Group	Nominated	
1996	"Everything Is Good for You"	Highest Selling Single	Nominated	
1996	"Everything Is Good for You"	Best Group	Nominated	
1997	"Instinct"	Best Group	Nominated	
1997	"Not the Girl You Think You Are" – Jeff Darling	Best Video	Nominated	
1997	Recurring Dream	Highest Selling Album	Won	
2010	Intriguer	Best Adult Contemporary Album	Won	
2016	Crowded House	ARIA Hall of Fame	Inducted	
2021	Dreamers Are Waiting	Best Adult Contemporary Album	Won	
2024	Gravity Stairs	Best Adult Contemporary Album	Nominated	
2024	Crowded House & Steven Schram Gravity Stairs	Best Produced Album	Nominated	

== Australasian Performing Right Association (APRA) Awards ==
Year	Country	Nominated work	Award	Result	Ref.
1987	Australia	"Don't Dream It's Over"	Most Performed Australasian Popular Work	Won	
1988	Australia	"Don't Dream It's Over"	Gold Award	Won	
1992	Australia	Neil Finn & Tim Finn	Songwriter of the Year	Won	
1993	Australia	"Fall at Your Feet"	Most Performed Australian Work Overseas	Won	
1993	Australia	"Four Seasons in One Day"	Song of the Year	Won	
1994	Australia	"Distant Sun"	Song of the Year	Won	
1994	Australia	Neil Finn	Songwriter of the Year	Won	
1994	Australia	"Weather with You"	Most Performed Australian Work Overseas	Won	
1995	Australia	"Private Universe"	Song of the Year	Nominated	
2001	Australia	"Don't Dream It's Over"	Top Ten Australian songs	No. 7	
2007	New Zealand	"Don't Stop Now"	Silver Scroll	Nominated	

== Mo Awards ==
The Australian Entertainment Mo Awards (commonly known informally as the Mo Awards), were annual Australian entertainment industry awards. They recognise achievements in live entertainment in Australia from 1975 to 2016. Crowded House won two awards in that time.

Year	Nominee / work	Award	Result (wins only)
1991	Crowded House	Rock Performer of the Year	Won
1994	Crowded House	Rock Performer of the Year	Won

== New Zealand Music Awards ==
Year	Nominated work	Award	Result	Ref.
1992	Crowded House	International Achievement	Won	
1993	"Four Seasons in One Day"	Music Video	Won	
1994	Crowded House	International Achievement	Won	
1995	Crowded House	International Achievement	Nominated	
1997	Crowded House	International Achievement	Nominated	

== Rolling Stone Australia Awards ==
The Rolling Stone Australia Awards are awarded annually by the Australian edition of Rolling Stone magazine for outstanding contributions to popular culture in the previous year.

Year	Nominee / work	Award	Result	Ref.
2024	Crowded House	Rolling Stone Icon Award	awarded	
2025	Crowded House	Rolling Stone Readers Award	Shortlisted	

== Other awards and accolades ==
Year	Nominated work	Award	Result	Ref.
1986	Crowded House	Countdown Awards - Best Album	Nominated	
1986	Crowded House	Countdown Awards - Best Debut Album	Won	
1986	"Mean to Me"	Countdown Awards - Best Debut Single	Won	
1986	Themselves	Countdown Awards - Best Debut Act	Won	
1986	"Don't Dream It's Over"	Countdown Awards - Best Group Performance in a Video	Nominated	
1986	"Don't Dream It's Over"	Countdown Awards - Best Video	Won	
1986	"Don't Dream It's Over"	Countdown Awards - Best Single	Nominated	
1987	"Don't Dream It's Over"	MTV Video Music Awards – Best New Artist	Won	
1987	"Don't Dream It's Over"	MTV Video Music Awards – Best Group Video	Nominated	
1987	"Don't Dream It's Over"	MTV Video Music Awards – Best Video Direction	Nominated	
1987	"Don't Dream It's Over"	MTV Video Music Awards – Best Special Effects	Nominated	
1989	Crowded House	Juno Awards – International Entertainer of the Year	Nominated	
1990	Crowded House	Juno Awards – International Entertainer of the Year	Nominated	
1991	"Don't Dream It's Over"	BMI Awards	Won	
1992	Crowded House	Q Awards – Best Live Act	Won	
1993	"Distant Sun"	Triple J Hottest 100, 1993	No. 60	
1993	Neil Finn (Crowded House)	Q Awards – Best Songwriter	Won	
1994	Crowded House	BRIT Awards – International Group of the Year	Won	
1995	"Something So Strong"	BMI Awards	Won	
1996	"Everything Is Good for You"	Triple J Hottest 100, 1996	No. 67	
1998	"Don't Dream It's Over"	Triple J Hottest 100 of All Time, 1998	No. 76	
2006	Woodface	The Age EG Music Awards – Best Album	Won	
2008	Crowded House – Frontier Touring Company	Helpmann Awards – Best Australian Contemporary Concert	Won	

== See also ==
- Crowded House discography – includes sales certifications
