= The Very Very Best of Crowded House =

Greatest hits album by Crowded House
- Released: 22 October 2010
- Genre: Rock, pop rock, jangle pop, alternative rock
- Length: 70:55
- Label: Capitol/EMI

Crowded House chronology
Intriguer (2010)	The Very Very Best of Crowded House (2010)	Dreamers Are Waiting (2021)

Alternative cover
- Cover of the CD + DVD box set

The Very Very Best of Crowded House is a compilation album featuring 19 singles from the period spanning Crowded House's first five studio albums. A CD and DVD box set is available, which includes a DVD of 25 of the band's music videos. The album is also available as a 'Deluxe Digital Version' which features 32 tracks including a rare 1987 live recording of the band's cover version of the Hunters & Collectors song "Throw Your Arms Around Me".

== History ==
The band left Capitol/EMI Records in 2010 and this album documents their time with that label. The album has not been mentioned on Crowded House's official website, although an email was sent to subscribers to their mailing list to announce its release, which suggests that the band had little involvement with it. An official press release from Capitol/EMI states that the album was released to celebrate the 25th anniversary of the formation of the band. No tracks from the band's 2010 album Intriguer are included because the band had left Capitol/EMI prior to the recording of that album, which was released on Universal and Fantasy (US).

== Track listing ==
This album largely duplicates the band's 1996 compilation Recurring Dream, but has been revised to include two songs from their 2007 album Time on Earth ("Don't Stop Now" and "Pour Le Monde"). Also included are two songs from 1993's Together Alone ("Fingers of Love" and "Nails in My Feet") and "Chocolate Cake" from 1991's Woodface, which were omitted from the previous compilation. Four early Crowded House singles, "World Where You Live", "When You Come", "Into Temptation" and "I Feel Possessed", which featured on Recurring Dream, have not been included on this new album. "Everything Is Good for You", one of three tracks specially recorded for the 1996 compilation, is also omitted. All of the above tracks appear on the "deluxe double-disc" version, however.

=== Disc 1 (CD) ===
All tracks are written by Neil Finn, except where noted.

No.	Title	Writer(s)	Original Album	Length
1.	"Something So Strong"	Neil Finn, Mitchell Froom	Crowded House	2:53
2.	"Weather with You"	Neil Finn, Tim Finn	Woodface	3:44
3.	"It's Only Natural"	Neil Finn, Tim Finn	Woodface	3:30
4.	"Chocolate Cake"	Neil Finn, Tim Finn	Woodface	4:01
5.	"Fall at Your Feet"		Woodface	3:18
6.	"Distant Sun"		Together Alone	3:51
7.	"Better Be Home Soon"		Temple of Low Men	3:08
8.	"Four Seasons in One Day"	Neil Finn, Tim Finn	Woodface	2:48
9.	"Don't Dream It's Over"		Crowded House	3:56
10.	"Mean to Me"		Crowded House	3:16
11.	"Locked Out"		Together Alone	3:17
12.	"Don't Stop Now"		Time on Earth	3:54
13.	"Pineapple Head"		Together Alone	3:29
14.	"Instinct"		Recurring Dream	3:09
15.	"Fingers of Love"		Together Alone	4:26
16.	"Private Universe"		Together Alone	5:39
17.	"Not the Girl You Think You Are"		Recurring Dream	4:10
18.	"Nails in My Feet"		Together Alone	3:42
19.	"Pour le Monde"		Time on Earth	5:10

=== CD & DVD box set: Disc 2 (DVD) ===
1. "Mean to Me" (Neil Finn) – 3:16
2. "Now We're Getting Somewhere" (Neil Finn) – 4:08
3. "Don't Dream It's Over" (Neil Finn) – 3:56
4. "World Where You Live" (Neil Finn) – 3:06
5. "Something So Strong" (Neil Finn, Mitchell Froom) – 2:53
6. "Better Be Home Soon" (Neil Finn) – 3:08
7. "When You Come" (Neil Finn) – 4:46
8. "Into Temptation" (Neil Finn) – 4:33
9. "Sister Madly" (Neil Finn) – 2:54
10. "I Feel Possessed" (Neil Finn) – 3:49
11. "Chocolate Cake" (Neil Finn, Tim Finn) – 4:01
12. "Fall at Your Feet" (Neil Finn) – 3:18
13. "It's Only Natural" (Neil Finn, Tim Finn) – 3:30
14. "Weather with You" (Neil Finn, Tim Finn) – 3:44
15. "Four Seasons in One Day" (Neil Finn, Tim Finn) – 2:48
16. "Distant Sun" (Neil Finn) – 3:51
17. "Nails in My Feet" (Neil Finn) – 3:42
18. "Locked Out" (Neil Finn) – 3:17
19. "Private Universe" (Neil Finn) – 5:39
20. "Everything Is Good for You" (Neil Finn) – 3:56
21. "Not the Girl You Think You Are" (Neil Finn) – 4:11
22. "Instinct" (Neil Finn) – 3:08
23. "Don't Stop Now" (Neil Finn) – 3:54
24. "She Called Up" (Neil Finn) – 2:54
25. "Better Be Home Soon" (Neil Finn) – 3:08

=== Deluxe Double-disc version ===
Disc 1:

1. "Now We're Getting Somewhere"
2. "World Where You Live"
3. "Weather with You"
4. "Something So Strong"
5. "When You Come"
6. "Fingers of Love"
7. "Four Seasons in One Day"
8. "Distant Sun"
9. "Don't Stop Now"
10. "Sister Madly"
11. "Chocolate Cake"
12. "Locked Out"
13. "Never Be the Same"
14. "Hole in the River"
15. "Not the Girl You Think You Are"
16. "Better Be Home Soon"

Disc 2:

1. "Mean to Me"
2. "It's Only Natural"
3. "Fall at Your Feet"
4. "Recurring Dream"
5. "Private Universe"
6. "Pineapple Head"
7. "She Called Up"
8. "I Feel Possessed"
9. "Instinct"
10. "Everything Is Good for You"
11. "Into Temptation"
12. "Nails in My Feet"
13. "Don't Dream It's Over"
14. "Pour le Monde"
15. "Whispers and Moans"
16. "Throw Your Arms Around Me" (Live from the Roxy, Los Angeles, 26 Feb. 1987)

== Reception ==
Professional ratings
Review scores
Source	Rating
The Music Fix	5/10 stars
BBC	positive
AllMusic	4.5/5 stars
musicOMH	3/5 stars
Classic Rock	8/10 stars

The Music Fix website described this release as a "shameless cash in" and recommended Recurring Dream as a cheaper and superior purchase. A BBC review also questioned, "Whether the world needs another Crowded House best of," but praised the album, saying that "several of these 19 tracks are solid-gold greats." AllMusic described the 32 track digital version of the album as, "The best Crowded House comp so far, verging on the definitive." The website musicOMH praised the album for being, "Littered with modern pop classics," but also recommended Recurring Dream as a better purchase, whilst admitting that the album, "will do enough business to warrant their record company's shameless opportunism." Classic Rock reviewer remarks how the band has progressed since the time when the material of the collection was recorded, but she says that "it's hard not to be wowed by this back catalogue of golden pop genius."

== Charts ==
=== Weekly charts ===
Chart (2010)	Peak position
Australian Albums (ARIA)	11
New Zealand Albums (RMNZ)	12
UK Albums Chart	49

=== Year-end charts ===
Chart (2011)	Position
Australian Albums Chart	79
Chart (2012)	Position
Australian Albums Chart	90
Chart (2016)	Position
Australian Albums Chart	56
Chart (2017)	Position
Australian Albums Chart	46
Chart (2018)	Position
Australian Albums Chart	73

== Certifications ==
Region	Certification	Certified units/sales
Australia (ARIA)	4× Platinum	280,000^{‡}
United Kingdom (BPI)	Gold	100,000^{‡}
^{‡} Sales+streaming figures based on certification alone.
