= Farewell to the World =

Live album by Crowded House
- Released: November 2006
- Recorded: 24 November 1996
- Venues: Sydney Opera House (Sydney, Australia)
- Genres: Pop rock, alternative rock
- Label: Capitol

Crowded House chronology
Classic Masters (2003)	Farewell to the World (2006)	Time on Earth (2007)

Professional ratings
Review scores
Source	Rating
AllMusic	4/5 stars
Music Box	4/5 stars
Pop Matters (DVD)	8/10 stars
Web Wombat	4/5 stars

Farewell to the World is a 1996 concert by rock group Crowded House, which was released on video in 1996 and on CD and DVD in 2006. The concert was recorded on the outside steps of the Sydney Opera House, as a charity event to raise funds for the Sydney Children's Hospital. The event was originally scheduled for the night of 23 November 1996; however, it was delayed one day due to rain. The concert was to be the last that the group played, as the group had announced their dissolution several months prior. The concert attracted a crowd of greater than 100,000 people, with some estimates of 250,000 people in attendance. Since then, several concerts have been performed in the same place, such as the Mushroom Records anniversary celebration. Every Australian Idol year finale uses the outdoor as well as the indoor of the Opera House.

The concert was originally aired on Network Ten in Australia in November 1996. It was incomplete as it did not include five songs performed at the concert. In December 1996, the concert was released on VHS, which also included some press coverage of the band's breakup. The VHS version contained all of the same songs as the television version other than "Weather with You", which was replaced by "Hole in the River".

The CD and DVD of the concert were released in November 2006, on the ten-year anniversary of the concert. These versions were remastered, and the DVD included all previous footage along with an interview with Neil Finn by Jana Wendt on Channel Nine's Sunday program. All songs were included on the DVD and CD release, including those omitted previously and the sound (and, for DVD, picture) was digitally remastered.

The setlist included many of Crowded House's most famous hits and many fan favourites. The supporting bands were Custard, You Am I and Powderfinger.

As the album was to be the final performance by the group, they called upon previous members Tim Finn and tour drummer Peter Jones to play during a portion of the event. Drummer Paul Hester, though he had previously left the band, was considered a member of the band for the performance, as he had been one for the majority of the group's tenure.

== Track listings ==
=== Disc 1 ===
1. "Mean to Me" – 4:11
2. "World Where You Live" – 3:33
3. "When You Come" – 5:54
4. "Private Universe" – 5:35
5. "Four Seasons in One Day" – 2:55
6. "Fall at Your Feet" – 3:26
7. "Whispers & Moans" – 4:30
8. "Hole in the River" – 6:48
9. "Better Be Home Soon" – 4:44
10. "Pineapple Head" – 4:04
11. "Distant Sun" – 4:52
12. "Into Temptation" – 4:50
13. "Everything Is Good for You" – 4:10

=== Disc 2 ===
1. "Locked Out" – 3:49
2. "Something So Strong" – 3:51
3. "Sister Madly" – 4:54
4. "Italian Plastic" – 3:52
5. "Weather with You" – 5:22
6. "It's Only Natural" – 5:08
7. "There Goes God" – 4:54
8. "Fingers of Love" – 5:36
9. "In My Command" – 4:27
10. "Throw Your Arms Around Me" (Hunters & Collectors cover) – 2:58
11. "Don't Dream It's Over" – 6:23

=== DVD ===
1. "Mean to Me" – 4:11
2. "World Where You Live" – 3:33
3. "When You Come" – 5:54
4. "Private Universe" – 5:35
5. "Four Seasons in One Day" – 2:54
6. "Fall at Your Feet" – 3:25
7. "Whispers and Moans" – 4:30
8. "Hole in the River" – 6:47
9. "Better Be Home Soon" – 4:43
10. "Pineapple Head" – 4:04
11. "Distant Sun" – 4:51
12. "Into Temptation" – 4:49
13. "Everything Is Good for You" – 4:09
14. "Locked Out" – 3:49
15. "Something So Strong" – 3:51
16. "Sister Madly" – 4:54
17. "Italian Plastic" – 3:51
18. "Weather with You" – 5:22
19. "It's Only Natural" – 5:07
20. "There Goes God" – 4:54
21. "Fingers of Love" – 5:35
22. "In My Command" – 4:26
23. "Throw Your Arms Around Me" – 2:57
24. "Don't Dream It's Over" – 6:22
  Credits (within "Don't Dream It's Over" track)

== Charts ==
Chart (2006)	Peak position
Australian Albums (ARIA)	46

== Certifications ==
Certifications for Farewell to the World
Region	Certification	Certified units/sales
Australia (ARIA)	Gold	35,000^{‡}
^{‡} Sales+streaming figures based on certification alone.

== Special features ==
Reverse of the US Great Seal, which the included T-shirt resembles

The 1996 VHS release of Farewell to the World featured a twenty-minute documentary entitled Planning the Event and a white Crowded House T-shirt with an erupting volcano and an evil eye flying out of the top (the overall image resembles the reverse of the United States Great Seal).

The 2006 DVD re-release did not include the T-shirt, but it did incorporate the documentary, along with a Channel Seven interview with Neil Finn, along with a new documentary. This documentary featured interviews with Finn and Nick Seymour, Michael Chugg, the event coordinator and many other participants. The DVD also featured remastered audio and adaptation to 5.1 surround sound, anamorphic 16:9 widescreen display, an audio commentary with Finn, Seymour and Mark Hart, a photo gallery of the concert and a full discography listing of the band up to 1999. Disc Two also includes three demos recorded by the band at various points: "Spirit of the Stairs", "Italian Plastic" and "Instinct".

Special feature	VHS	DVD
T-shirt	Yes	No
Original audio mix	Yes	Yes
Planning the Event	Yes	Yes
Channel Seven Neil Finn Interview	No	Yes
Audio commentary	No	Yes
DTS 5.1 audio	No	Yes
16:9 display	No	Yes
Photo gallery	No	Yes
Crowded House discography	No	Yes

== Personnel ==
Crowded House

- Neil Finn – vocals, guitar
- Nick Seymour – bass guitar, backing vocals
- Mark Hart – guitar, electric twelve-string guitar, keyboards, Hammond organ, melodica, Rhodes piano, backing vocals
- Paul Hester – drums, backing vocals

Additional musicians

- Tim Finn – vocals and guitar ("Weather with You" and "It's Only Natural" only)
- Peter Jones – drums ("Sister Madly" only)
- Jules Bowen – keyboards

Production

- Angus Davidson – sound design, live sound, DVD audio production
- Tchad Blake - audio mixing
- Noel Crombie – set/stage design
- Sharon Chai – cover design
- Reg Mombassa – cover element design (with Seymour)
