= Recurring Dream =

1996 greatest hits album by Crowded House

Greatest hits album by Crowded House
- Released: 24 June 1996
- Genres: Pop rock, jangle pop, alternative rock
- Length: 70:11
- Label: Capitol
- Producers: Mitchell Froom, Neil Finn and Tchad Blake

Crowded House chronology
Together Alone (1993)	Recurring Dream (1996)	Afterglow (1999)

Singles from Recurring Dream
- 1. "Everything Is Good for You" Released: June 1996 (Aus); 2. "Instinct" Released: June 1996; 3. "Not the Girl You Think You Are" Released: August 1996; 4. "Don't Dream It's Over" Released: October 1996 (Europe)

Professional ratings
Review scores
Source	Rating
AllMusic	4.5/5 stars
Chicago Tribune	3.5/4 stars
The Encyclopedia of Popular Music	5/5 stars
Entertainment Weekly	A−
The Guardian	5/5 stars
NME	8/10
The Village Voice	(dud)

Recurring Dream: The Very Best of Crowded House, usually abbreviated to Recurring Dream, is a compilation album by rock group Crowded House, released in 1996. It includes most of their singles, as well as three new songs, "Not the Girl You Think You Are", "Instinct", and "Everything Is Good for You".

== Background ==
Crowded House were touring in support of their album Together Alone, when after a concert in Atlanta on 14 April 1994, drummer Paul Hester decided to leave the band. He was eventually replaced by Peter Jones. The band completed the tour and returned to Australia where bandleader Neil Finn began writing songs for their next album, provisionally titled Help Is Coming. During this time he also wrote and recorded the album Finn with his brother Tim Finn. At a press conference in 1996, at which the release of Recurring Dream was announced, Neil Finn revealed that Crowded House were to split up. The June concerts in Europe and Canada would be their final shows.

The collection was released in June 1996 and features four songs from each of the group's four studio albums, as well as the three new songs. Hester returned to play on these songs, but despite this he is not credited as a full band member on the album sleeve, which reads, "Performed by Crowded House (Neil Finn, Nick Seymour and Mark Hart) with Paul Hester." The new photos on the album sleeve only show Neil Finn, Seymour and Hart, although Hester and Tim Finn both appear several times in a collage of old band photos. The wording on the album implies that Hart played on all 19 tracks. In fact he only became a full band member on their fourth album Together Alone, although he did receive an 'additional keyboards' credit for unspecified tracks on the album Woodface. Hester may not appear on the song "Weather with You", because Ricky Fataar is credited with drums on that track on the Woodface sleeve.

The album's title Recurring Dream, is also the name of a song written in 1985, when the group were still known as 'The Mullanes', by Finn, Hester, Seymour and the band's then guitarist Craig Hooper. The song "Recurring Dream" was not included on this compilation, but was later featured on Afterglow, Crowded House's 1999 rarities collection. At the 1997 ARIA Music Awards, Recurring Dream won in the 'Highest Selling Album' category. The award was presented by Dave Graney who joked in his presentation speech that it's, "Sometimes just about the money!"

The album's cover was painted by bassist Nick Seymour. Like Together Alone and Temple of Low Men it features a red car. The cover also shows an electric fan, an item which appeared on the sleeve of their debut album. The bare chested man on the album cover appears to be Seymour himself.

== New songs ==
Three new tracks were recorded specially for Recurring Dream by Finn, Seymour, Hart and Hester. "Everything Is Good for You", "Instinct" and "Not the Girl You Think You Are" were recorded at York Street Studios in Auckland, New Zealand and were produced by Finn, Mitchell Froom and Tchad Blake. In a 2006 interview, Neil Finn said of "Everything Is Good for You", "The philosophy of the song is slightly obscure in the verses, but really it's about not allowing regrets to rule your life. But it's also got a sense of humour. There's a wryness to it. It's not a message song particularly."

Of "Instinct" he said, "I did a demo of it at home. It's just built on a bass riff...I put down a drum track, put a bass track to it and had it around for about a month. The lyrics are, as it turns out, extremely appropriate for the time: Nearly time to flick the switch/Hanging by a single stitch/Laughing at the stony face of gloom. I mean, in a way it was an instinctive decision for me to discontinue working with the band. My stomach told me to do it, so that's what the song is about: recognizing those moments and having the desire to follow it through."

Of "Not the Girl You Think You Are" he said, "I wrote that with the assistance of an Optigan keyboard, which is a weird old antique from the '60s, a trashy antique. It's a machine that reads optical discs, the most primitive form of sampling from the '60s. I had found piano loops on it that I just put a sequence together from and I wrote the song in 10 minutes on top of it."

Due to this compilation being superseded by The Very Very Best of Crowded House in 2010 and "Everything Is Good for You" being omitted from that album, all three tracks were included on the 2016 deluxe edition of Afterglow.

== Track listing ==
All songs were written by Neil Finn, except where noted.

No.	Title	Writer(s)	Original album	Length
1.	"Weather with You" (Single version)	Neil and Tim Finn	Woodface	3:44
2.	"World Where You Live"		Crowded House	3:06
3.	"Fall at Your Feet"		Woodface	3:18
4.	"Locked Out"		Together Alone	3:18
5.	"Don't Dream It's Over"		Crowded House	3:55
6.	"Into Temptation"		Temple of Low Men	4:34
7.	"Pineapple Head"		Together Alone	3:28
8.	"When You Come"		Temple of Low Men	4:44
9.	"Private Universe"		Together Alone	5:36
10.	"Not the Girl You Think You Are"		New song	4:08
11.	"Instinct"		New song	3:08
12.	"I Feel Possessed"		Temple of Low Men	3:48
13.	"Four Seasons in One Day"	Neil and Tim Finn	Woodface	2:48
14.	"It's Only Natural"	Neil and Tim Finn	Woodface	3:32
15.	"Distant Sun"		Together Alone	3:50
16.	"Something So Strong"	Neil Finn, Mitchell Froom	Crowded House	2:52
17.	"Mean to Me"		Crowded House	3:14
18.	"Better Be Home Soon"		Temple of Low Men	3:10
19.	"Everything Is Good for You"		New song	3:58
Total length:				70:11

== Special Edition Live Album ==
Special Edition Live Album

Live album by Crowded House
- Released: October 1996
- Genres: Pop rock, jangle pop
- Length: 72:43
- Label: Capitol
- Producer: Neil Finn
- Compiler: Nigel Griggs

Recurring Dream was also released as a two-disc version, the second disc being titled Special Edition Live Album. The songs were selected by Split Enz bassist Nigel Griggs, who was asked to do the job by Neil Finn, according to the album's sleeve notes. Just days after he accepted the job, hundreds of cassettes of Crowded House performances arrived for him to evaluate. The recordings he chose were not remixed or adjusted in any way before they were put on the album. Only four of the tracks from the main album had their live versions included on the second disc.

Five of the live album's songs are from the same concert, at The Civic Theatre in Newcastle, New South Wales. Other songs from this performance have appeared as B-sides, including "Chocolate Cake" on the "Instinct" single. The recording of "Fingers of Love" comes from Paul Hester's final show, in Atlanta, before he quit the band.

=== Track listing ===
Track	Song	Songwriter	Venue	Date	Length
1	"There Goes God"	N. Finn, T. Finn	The Civic Theater, Newcastle, New South Wales, Australia	20 March 1992	5:37
2	"Newcastle Jam"	N. Finn, P. Hester, N. Seymour, M. Hart	The Civic Theater, Newcastle, Australia	20 March 1992	2:43
3	"Love You Till the Day I Die"	N. Finn	The Civic Theater, Newcastle, Australia	20 March 1992	4:47
4	"Hole in the River" (Note: Contains the last bars of the traditional Irish song The Parting Glass)	N. Finn, Eddie Rayner	The Civic Theater, Newcastle, Australia	20 March 1992	8:55
5	"Private Universe"	N. Finn	Aston Villa Leisure Centre, Birmingham, England	18 November 1993	4:55
6	"Pineapple Head"	N. Finn	The Apollo, Manchester, England	22 November 1993	3:26
7	"How Will You Go"	N. Finn, T. Finn	Barrowland Ballroom, Glasgow, Scotland	12 July 1992	3:23
8	"Left Hand"	N. Finn	Vooruit Concertzaal, Ghent, Belgium	18 October 1991	3:14
9	"Whispers and Moans"	N. Finn	Tower Theater, Upper Darby Township, Pennsylvania, U.S.	3 October 1991	4:43
10	"Kill Eye"	N. Finn	Tower Theater, Upper Darby Township, Pennsylvania, U.S.	3 October 1991	3:19
11	"Fingers of Love"	N. Finn	Roxy Theatre, Atlanta, U.S.	14 April 1994	5:02
12	"Don't Dream It's Over"	N. Finn	Cambridge Corn Exchange, Cambridge, England	6 March 1992	4:03
13	"When You Come"	N. Finn	The Civic Theater, Newcastle, Australia	20 March 1992	7:26
14	"Sister Madly"	N. Finn	Portsmouth Guildhall, Portsmouth, England	23 November 1993	6:45
15	"In My Command"	N. Finn	Panzerhalle, Munich, Germany	12 December 1993	4:22

The album is performed by Neil Finn, Nick Seymour, Paul Hester and Mark Hart, apart from tracks 7, 8, 9 and 10 which feature Tim Finn rather than Hart.

== Charts ==
=== Weekly charts ===
Chart (1996+)	Peak position
Australian Albums (ARIA)	1
Austrian Albums (Ö3 Austria)	43
Canadian Albums Chart	12
German Albums Chart	57
Dutch Albums (Album Top 100)	10
New Zealand Albums (RMNZ)	1
Norwegian Albums (VG-lista)	5
Swedish Albums (Sverigetopplistan)	43
Swiss Albums (Schweizer Hitparade)	17
UK Albums Chart	1

=== Year-end charts ===
Chart (1996)	Position
Australia (ARIA Charts)	6
Chart (1997)	Position
Australia (ARIA Charts)	22
Chart (2007)	Position
Australia (ARIA Charts)	97

=== Decade-end charts ===
Chart (2010–2019)	Position
Australian Albums (ARIA)	47
Australian Artist Albums (ARIA)	6

== Certifications ==
Region	Certification	Certified units/sales
Australia (ARIA)	13× Platinum	910,000^{^}
Belgium (BRMA)	Gold	25,000^{*}
Canada (Music Canada)	Gold	50,000^{^}
Netherlands (NVPI)	Gold	50,000^{^}
New Zealand (RMNZ)	Platinum	15,000^{^}
Spain (Promusicae)	2× Platinum	200,000^{^}
United Kingdom (BPI)	4× Platinum	1,200,000^{^}
Summaries
Europe (IFPI)	2× Platinum	2,000,000^{*}
^{*} Sales figures based on certification alone.^{^} Shipments figures based on certification alone.

== See also ==
- List of best-selling albums in Australia
