= Afterglow (Crowded House album) =

Compilation album by Crowded House
- Released: May 1999
- Recorded: 1985–1994
- Genres: Pop rock, alternative rock
- Length: 47:10
- Label: Capitol
- Producers: Crowded House, Youth, Mitchell Froom

Crowded House chronology
| Recurring Dream (1996) | Afterglow (1999) | Classic Masters (2003) |

Professional ratings
Review scores
| Source | Rating |
|---|---|
| Allmusic | 3.5/5 stars |
| CNN Entertainment | positive |
| Canoe--Jam! | positive |

Afterglow is a compilation album released by Australian-New Zealand rock band Crowded House in 1999. It consists of outtakes, b-sides and other rarities recorded between 1985 and 1995. Seven of the songs were originally recorded for the Woodface album before Tim Finn became involved.

The song "Left Hand" appears on Crowded House's live album Special Edition Live Album. "Help Is Coming" was the first released studio recording to feature drummer and co-writer Peter Jones, and was re-released in 2015 as a charity single for Syrian refugees. "You Can Touch" was a bonus track for the Japanese edition of Together Alone.

== Track listing ==
All tracks are written by Neil Finn, except where noted.

| No. | Title | Length |
|---|---|---|
| 1. | "I Am in Love" | 4:38 |
| 2. | "Sacred Cow" | 3:37 |
| 3. | "You Can Touch" | 3:46 |
| 4. | "Help Is Coming" (Finn, Mark Hart, Nick Seymour, Peter Jones) | 4:49 |
| 5. | "I Love You Dawn" | 2:34 |
| 6. | "Dr. Livingstone" | 3:57 |
| 7. | "My Telly's Gone Bung" (Paul Hester) | 3:13 |
| 8. | "Private Universe (Zen Mix)" | 4:08 |
| 9. | "Lester (Home Demo)" | 2:18 |
| 10. | "Anyone Can Tell" | 3:36 |
| 11. | "Recurring Dream" (Finn, Hester, Craig Hooper, Seymour) | 3:24 |
| 12. | "Left Hand" | 2:57 |
| 13. | "Time Immemorial" | 4:07 |

- *On all releases of Afterglow Mark Hart's name is missing from the writer's credits for the song "Help Is Coming". His name is correctly mentioned on the label of the "Help Is Coming" charity single from 2015.

=== 2016 Deluxe Edition ===
Includes the original album plus disc two.

All tracks are written by Neil Finn, except where noted.

Disc 2 (Unreleased and rare material)
| No. | Title | Length |
|---|---|---|
| 1. | "I Am in Love (Home Demo)" | 2:08 |
| 2. | "Instinct (Home Demo)" | 2:04 |
| 3. | "Spirit of the Stairs (Home Demo)" | 3:41 |
| 4. | "I'm So Scared of Losing I Can't Compete (Home Demo)" | 2:11 |
| 5. | "Everything Is Good For You (Home Demo)" | 3:15 |
| 6. | "Not The Girl You Think You Are (Home Demo)" | 3:01 |
| 7. | "Anthem *" | 3:31 |
| 8. | "I Don't Know You (Studio Demo)" (Mark Hart) | 3:40 |
| 9. | "Taste of Something Divine (Studio Demo)" (Finn, Hart, Nick Seymour, Peter Jones, Paddy Free) | 4:14 |
| 10. | "Spirit Of The Stairs (Studio Demo) *" | 4:57 |
| 11. | "Loose Tongue (Rough Mix)" (Finn, Jim Moginie) | 3:51 |
| 12. | "Instinct *" | 3:06 |
| 13. | "Everything Is Good For You *" | 3:52 |
| 14. | "Not The Girl You Think You Are *" | 4:10 |

Note

- * Previously released

== Charts ==
=== Weekly charts ===
| Chart (1999) | Peak position |
|---|---|
| Australian Albums (ARIA) | 36 |
| New Zealand Albums (RMNZ) | 30 |

=== Year-end charts ===
| Chart (1999) | Position |
|---|---|
| Australian Albums (ARIA) | 80 |

== Certifications ==
| Region | Certification | Certified units/sales |
|---|---|---|
| Australia (ARIA) | Gold | 35,000^{^} |
^{^} Shipments figures based on certification alone.
