= Locked Out (Crowded House song) =

1994 single by Crowded House

Single by Crowded House

from the album Together Alone
- Released: 12 January 1994
- Length: 3:18
- Label: Capitol
- Songwriter: Neil Finn
- Producer: Youth

Crowded House singles chronology
"Nails in My Feet" (1993)	"Locked Out" (1994)	"Fingers of Love" (1994)

Music video
- "Locked Out" on YouTube

"Locked Out" is a song by Australian-New Zealand rock group Crowded House from their fourth studio album, Together Alone (1993). It was written by Neil Finn, produced by Youth, and released as a single in January 1994 by Capitol Records. The song was also included on the soundtrack to the American film Reality Bites. In the United Kingdom, it was the most successful single from Together Alone, reaching No. 12. The single fared less well in Australia, where it peaked at No. 79 in June 1994. Its accompanying music video was directed by London-based director Zanna and shot on location in Wales and England. The cover artwork of the single features the four members of Crowded House in a mirror image, including Mark Hart.

== Critical reception ==
Alan Jones from Music Week gave the song a score of three out of five, writing, "The third single from their Together Alone album will disappoint those who prefer Crowded House in their more usual thoughtful mode, as they rock out with much style and little consequence. Sure to go Top 40, however, especially as the CDs yield six otherwise unavailable live recordings."

== Track listings ==
- Australian and US single
1. "Locked Out" – 3:18
2. "World Where You Live" (live)
3. "It's Only Natural" (live)
4. "Weather with You" (live)

Note: Live tracks were recorded at The Town & Country Club, London, 9 November 1991.

- UK cassette single
1. "Locked Out" – 3:18
2. "Distant Sun" (live) – 4:19

Note: Live track were recorded at the Hammersmith Apollo, England, 12 November 1993.

- UK CD single
1. "Locked Out" – 3:19
2. "Distant Sun" (live) – 4:19
3. "Hole in the River" (live) – 7:41
4. "Sister Madly" (live) – 2:56

Note: "Distant Sun" and "Sister Madly" were recorded at the Hammersmith Apollo, England on 12 November 1993; "Hole in the River" was recorded live at the Hammersmith Apollo on 13 November 1993. "Sister Madly" was performance is incomplete.

- Alternate UK CD single
1. "Locked Out" – 3:17
2. "Private Universe" (live) – 5:01
3. "Fall at Your Feet" (live) – 4:01
4. "Better Be Home Soon" (live) – 3:39

Note: "Private Universe" and "Fall at Your feet" were recorded at the Hammersmith Apollo, England, 12 November 1993; "Better Be Home Soon" was recorded live at the Hammersmith Apollo on 14 November 1993.

- UK 12-inch vinyl release
1. "Locked Out" – 3:19
2. "Distant Sun" (live) – 4:19
3. "Fall at Your Feet" (live) – 4:01
4. "Private Universe" (live) – 5:01

Note: Live tracks were recorded at the Hammersmith Apollo, England, 12 November 1993.

== Charts ==
=== Weekly charts ===
Chart (1994)	Peak position
Australia (ARIA)	79
Europe (Eurochart Hot 100)	45
Israel (Israeli Singles Chart)	38
Scottish Singles Sales (Official Charts)	91
UK Singles (Official Charts)	12
UK Airplay (Music Week)	20
US Modern Rock Tracks (Billboard)	8

=== Year-end charts ===
Chart (1994)	Position
UK Singles (OCC)	198

== Release history ==
Region	Date	Format(s)	Label(s)	Ref.
Japan	12 January 1994	Mini-CD	Capitol	
United Kingdom	7 February 1994	10-inch vinyl; CD; cassette	Capitol	
Australia	23 May 1994	CD; cassette	Capitol	
