= Fall at Your Feet =

1991 single by Crowded House

Single by Crowded House

from the album Woodface
- Released: August 1991
- Length: 3:18
- Label: Capitol
- Songwriter: Neil Finn
- Producers: Mitchell Froom; Neil Finn

Crowded House singles chronology
"Chocolate Cake" (1991)	"Fall at Your Feet" (1991)	"It's Only Natural" (1991)

"Fall at Your Feet" is a song by Australian-New Zealand rock band Crowded House from their third studio album, Woodface (1991). It is the only single from Woodface to be written solely by the group's leader, Neil Finn, who co-wrote all other singles from the album with his brother Tim Finn. The song peaked at number 17 in the United Kingdom, making it Woodface's second-most-successful single, after "Weather with You". The song also entered the top 40 in Australia, Canada, France, Ireland, and New Zealand.

At the APRA Music Awards of 1993, the song won Most Performed Australian Work Overseas. "Fall at Your Feet" was later released on the group's greatest hits collection Recurring Dream and was performed at the group's farewell performance in 1996, Farewell to the World.

== Covers ==
In 2010, Boy & Bear covered the song for a Finn Brothers' covers album, He Will Have His Way which came in at number five on Triple J's Hottest 100 for 2010. In 2024, Cyril and Dean Lewis covered the song for the former's EP From Down Under. The song was certified Gold by Australian Recording Industry Association (ARIA) a year later.

Another cover of the song is featured on James Blunt's album "Back to Bedlam".

== Personnel ==
Crowded House

- Neil Finn – lead vocals, electric guitar
- Tim Finn – acoustic guitar, backing vocals
- Nick Seymour – bass guitar, backing vocals
- Paul Hester – drums, backing vocals

Additional musicians

- Mitchell Froom – keyboards
- Mark Hart – keyboards
- Alex Acuña – percussion
- Geoffrey Hales – percussion

== Track listings ==
All songs were written by Neil Finn, except "Six Months in a Leaky Boat" (Tim Finn and Split Enz) and "Something So Strong" (Neil Finn and Mitchell Froom).

- CD single – Australia, United States
1. "Fall at Your Feet" – 3:18
2. "Whispers and Moans" – 3:40
3. "Six Months in a Leaky Boat" (live) – 2:47
- 7-inch single – Australia
1. "Fall at Your Feet" – 3:18
2. "Whispers and Moans" – 3:40
- 7-inch single and cassette – Europe
1. "Fall at Your Feet" – 3:18
2. "Don't Dream It's Over" – 3:57
- CD single – Europe
1. "Fall at Your Feet" – 3:18
2. "Six Months in a Leaky Boat" (live) – 2:47
3. "Now We're Getting Somewhere" (live) – 4:16
4. "Something So Strong" – 2:51
- CD single – Europe
1. "Fall at Your Feet" – 3:18
2. "Don't Dream It's Over" – 4:03
3. "Sister Madly" – 2:52
4. "Better Be Home Soon" – 3:07

== Charts ==
Weekly chart performance for "Fall at Your Feet"
Chart (1991–1992)	Peak position
Australia (ARIA)	31
Canada Top Singles (RPM)	24
Europe (Eurochart Hot 100)	43
Europe (European Hit Radio)	26
France (SNEP)	30
Ireland (IRMA)	21
Israel (Israeli Singles Chart)	9
Luxembourg (Radio Luxembourg)	6
Netherlands (Dutch Top 40 Tipparade)	7
Netherlands (Single Top 100)	41
New Zealand (Recorded Music NZ)	24
UK Singles (Official Charts)	17
UK Airplay (Music Week)	4
US Billboard Hot 100	75

== Certifications ==
=== Crowded House version ===
Certifications for "Fall at Your Feet"
Region	Certification	Certified units/sales
Australia (ARIA)	3× Platinum	210,000^{‡}
New Zealand (RMNZ)	2× Platinum	60,000^{‡}
United Kingdom (BPI)	Silver	200,000^{‡}
^{‡} Sales+streaming figures based on certification alone.

=== Boy & Bear version ===
Certifications for "Fall at Your Feet", Boy & Bear version
Region	Certification	Certified units/sales
Australia (ARIA)	3× Platinum	210,000^{‡}
^{‡} Sales+streaming figures based on certification alone.

=== Cyril and Dean Lewis version ===
Certifications for "Fall at Your Feet", Cyril and Dean Lewis version
Region	Certification	Certified units/sales
Australia (ARIA)	Gold	35,000^{‡}
New Zealand (RMNZ)	Gold	15,000^{‡}
^{‡} Sales+streaming figures based on certification alone.
