= Now We're Getting Somewhere =

1986 single by Crowded House

Single by Crowded House

from the album Crowded House
- Released: September 1986
- Recorded: Sunset Sound, Los Angeles, 1985
- Genre: Rock
- Length: 4:05
- Label: Capitol
- Songwriter: Neil Finn
- Producer: Mitchell Froom

Crowded House singles chronology
"World Where You Live" (1986)	"Now We're Getting Somewhere" (1986)	"Don't Dream It's Over" (1986)

"Now We're Getting Somewhere" is a 1986 song by rock group, Crowded House. It was the third single from the group's debut album Crowded House. It is the only single from that album to not appear on any of the band's greatest hits albums; Recurring Dream & The Very Very Best of Crowded House. It was the first single to feature the song, "Recurring Dream", as a B-Side. "Now We're Getting Somewhere" peaked at No. 63 on the Australian Kent Music Report singles chart, and No. 33 in New Zealand.

== Track listing ==
All songs by Neil Finn. Released as 7" vinyl single in Australia by Capitol (Catalogue CP 1822).

1. "Now We're Getting Somewhere" - 4:09
2. "Recurring Dream" - 2:59

== Charts ==
Chart (1986)	Peak position
Australia (Kent Music Report)	63
Australia (ARIA)	3

== Certifications ==
Certifications for "Better Be Home Soon"
Region	Certification	Certified units/sales
Australia (ARIA)	Gold	35,000^{‡}
^{‡} Sales+streaming figures based on certification alone.
