= Nails in My Feet =

1993 single by Crowded House

Single by Crowded House

from the album Together Alone
- Released: 8 November 1993
- Length: 3:39
- Label: Capitol
- Songwriter: Neil Finn
- Producer: Youth

Crowded House singles chronology
"Distant Sun" (1993)	"Nails in My Feet" (1993)	"Locked Out" (1994)

Music video
- "Nails in My Feet" on YouTube

"Nails in My Feet" is a song by Australian-New Zealand rock group Crowded House, released in November 1993 by Capitol Records as the second single from their fourth studio album, Together Alone (1993). The song was written by Neil Finn and produced by Youth.

== Track listings ==
In the UK, a two disc CD set was made available separately. Disc one was released in a double case, while disc two was sold in a sleeve to insert into the case with disc one. "Four Seasons in One Day" recorded at the parking lot of Capitol Records, Hollywood, 10 July 1991. "You Can Touch" and "I Am in Love" previously unreleased and were later released on the Crowded House rarities album Afterglow.

- UK CD1
1. "Nails in My Feet" – 3:39
2. "You Can Touch" – 3:46
3. "Zen Roxy" (instrumental) – 6:42
- UK CD2
1. "Nails in My Feet" – 3:39
2. "I Am in Love" – 4:32
3. "Four Seasons in One Day" (live, Capitol records Parking lot show, 10 July 1991) – 3:29
- UK 7-inch single
1. "Nails in My Feet" – 3:39
2. "Don't Dream It's Over" (live, The Roxy, Los Angeles, 24 February 1987)
- Dutch CD
1. "Nails in My Feet" – 3:39
2. "I Am in Love" – 4:32
- Australian VHS single
1. "Nails in My Feet"
2. "Distant Sun"
3. Footage from the Together Alone recording session

== Charts ==
Chart (1993–1994)	Peak position
Australia (ARIA)	34
Europe (Eurochart Hot 100)	74
Europe (European Hit Radio)	36
New Zealand (Recorded Music NZ)	11
UK Singles (OCC)	22
UK Airplay (Music Week)	20

== Release history ==
Region	Date	Format(s)	Label(s)	Ref.
United Kingdom	8 November 1993	7-inch vinyl; CD; cassette	Capitol	
Australia	24 January 1994	CD; cassette	Capitol	
