= Pineapple Head =

1994 single by Crowded House

Single by Crowded House

from the album Together Alone
- Released: September 1994
- Genre: Rock
- Length: 3:28
- Label: Capitol
- Songwriter: Neil Finn
- Producer: Youth

Crowded House singles chronology
"Fingers of Love" (1994)	"Pineapple Head" (1994)	"Private Universe" (1994)

"Pineapple Head" is a song by Australian-New Zealand rock band Crowded House from their fourth studio album, Together Alone (1993). It was released as a single in September 1994 by Capitol Records.

The song was later included on the group's greatest hits compilation Recurring Dream. It was also performed by the band in their farewell concert Farewell to the World in 1996. The song was left off the initial VHS release and television broadcast, but was, however, restored for the tenth anniversary DVD release. In 2005, Natalie Imbruglia recorded a version of "Pineapple Head" to contribute to She Will Have Her Way, a tribute to Neil Finn and Tim Finn by various female musicians and bands.

== Cover art ==
The single's cover art was created by Reg Mombassa, the artist responsible for creating the clothing brand Mambo Graphics and who had also been a member of popular Australian band Mental as Anything. The cover features a man with three eyes and a pineapple for a head, indicative of the song title.

== Composition ==
The original inspiration for the song was Neil's son, Liam Finn, who uttered several phrases which later became lyrics while affected by fever. The song shares musical similarities with "Norwegian Wood" by the Beatles. The song is unusual in the modern pop/rock era, being a 3/4 time signature song, compared to most contemporary music being in 4/4. This gives it a distinctive, waltz-like swing. On the live album, LIVE 92–94, Pt. 1 – Track 8, Neil counts out 1,2,3 1,2,3 after slowing the band down during the performance intro.

== Reception ==
Junkee described it as, "a sea-shanty waltz, with steely guitars and a cooing Mellotron beneath it. Compositionally it’s part "Norwegian Wood", part "Golden Brown", all Crowded House." Alan Jones from Music Week wrote, "An attractive, understated single with a lilting melody, intricate fretwork and a fine vocal. The inclusion of their finest songs—'Weather with You' and 'Don't Dream It's Over'—as bonus tracks won't harm its chances."

== Track listings ==
- CD and 12-inch single
1. "Pineapple Head" – 3:28
2. "Weather with You" – 3:44
3. "Don't Dream It's Over" – 3:55
4. "Together Alone" – 3:55
- Cassette single
1. "Pineapple Head" – 3:28
2. "Weather with You" – 3:44

== Charts ==
Chart (1994)	Peak position
New Zealand (Recorded Music NZ)	50
UK Singles (Official Charts)	27
UK Airplay (Music Week)	20
