= Together Alone =

Studio album by Crowded House
- Released: 18 October 1993
- Recorded: 1992–1993
- Studios: Karekare Beach, New Zealand; Periscope Studios, Melbourne; Platinum Melbourne
- Genres: Alternative rock; pop rock
- Length: 51:32
- Label: Capitol
- Producers: Youth and Crowded House

Crowded House chronology
Woodface (1991)	Together Alone (1993)	Recurring Dream (1996)

Singles from Together Alone
- 1. "Distant Sun" Released: 20 September 1993; 2. "Nails in My Feet" Released: 8 November 1993; 3. "Locked Out" Released: 12 January 1994; 4. "Fingers of Love" Released: 29 May 1994; 5. "Pineapple Head" Released: September 1994; 6. "Private Universe" Released: 31 October 1994

Together Alone is the fourth studio album by New Zealand-Australian band Crowded House. It was released in October 1993 and was their first album to feature multi-instrumentalist Mark Hart as a full band member. Unlike the band's first three albums, which were recorded in the US and Australia and produced by Mitchell Froom, Together Alone was recorded in New Zealand with producer Youth. Six singles were released from Together Alone, including "Distant Sun", which was a top 10 hit in New Zealand and Canada, and "Locked Out" which reached number 12 on the UK singles chart and number 8 on the US Modern Rock chart, the latter on the strength of the song's inclusion on the soundtrack of the 1994 film Reality Bites.

== Background ==
Together Alone was mainly recorded at Neil Finn's friends Nigel and Jody Horrocks' house at Karekare Beach in New Zealand, with additional recording in Melbourne, Australia at both Periscope and Platinum Studios. The album's opening track was named "Kare Kare". Paul Hester said, "We flew in Youth and an engineer called Greg Hunter straight off the streets of Brixton to Karekare Beach, New Zealand – miles from anywhere, no shops, no nothing. They were in shock for days. Didn't know where the fuck they were."

AllMusic noted that Together Alone is "more experimental and musically varied than any of their previous releases" and cited the addition of Mark Hart to the band's line-up and new producer Youth as reasons for this. The site also notes that the band also used the record to branch into traditional Māori music. The album features more complex, layered guitar and keyboard arrangements than on Crowded House's previous works. The title track features a New Zealand Māori choir and log drummers and was co-written by Ngapo "Bub" Wehi of the Te Waka Huia Cultural Group Choir, who also provide backing vocals on "In My Command" and "Catherine Wheels".

"Private Universe" also features Micronesian log drummers.

"Catherine Wheels" was written by Neil and Tim Finn while with Split Enz and was originally titled "The First to Say Gone". The final version included input from bass player Nick Seymour, which earned him a co-writing credit, one of only five he has with Crowded House. (The others are "Recurring Dream" and "Help Is Coming" from Afterglow, "Newcastle Jam" from the Special Edition Live Album and "Isolation" from Intriguer.)

Together Alone topped the album chart in New Zealand, reached number two in Australia and number four in the United Kingdom. Due to its inclusion on the Reality Bites soundtrack, the song "Locked Out" was bundled with the Knack's "My Sharona", which also features in the film, as a promotional jukebox single. The video single release of "Nails in My Feet" featured a documentary of the making of Together Alone entitled Footage from the Together Alone Recording Session.

The Japanese edition contained the bonus track "You Can Touch" which later appeared on the compilation Afterglow.

== Cover art ==
The album cover was created by Nick Seymour. It depicts Jesus, Buddha and Muhammad riding together in a car. Muhammad is covered by a curtain in order to respect the Islamic belief that he should not be depicted; only his arm is visible. The original design featured Muhammad without a curtain. The decision was made to add one when the cover was strongly objected to by Muslim guitarist Richard Thompson. The car is surrounded by a golden halo and has fluffy dice hanging from the rear view mirror. The cover of the 2007 single "Don't Stop Now" has a similar red car and the song's video features the car during its animated sequences. The album artwork was co-designed by Seymour and Margo Chase. It incorporates photography, by Youri Lenquette and Merlyn Rosenberg, of the band and of landscapes including Karekare beach. Vinyl pressings of Together Alone have a golden border (much like the halo around the red car) surrounding the outside of the cover.

== Critical reception ==
Professional ratings
Review scores
Source	Rating
AllMusic	3/5 stars
Chicago Tribune	3/4 stars
Classic Rock	9/10
Entertainment Weekly	B
Los Angeles Times	3/4 stars
Mojo	5/5 stars
NME	7/10
Q	5/5 stars
Rolling Stone	3/5 stars
Uncut	9/10

Writing in The Michigan Daily, Heather Phares called it a "catchy and spiritual listen that runs the gamut of emotions, from the hyperkinetic 'Locked Out' to the hushed 'Distant Sun'." She credited producer Youth for making it a "challenging yet listenable album." NME's Ian Fortnam called it an "ambitious and impressive fourth album" that was "guaranteed to shift vast units." He also highlighted Youth's "inspired production craft", citing the Pink Floyd-esque "slide" of "Kare Kare", the "gutsy metalwork" of "Skin Feeling" and the "Screamadelica chill-out percussion" on "Fingers of Love" as examples, but deemed the "cross-cultural" title track to be the highlight, noting the polyrhythmic log drums, Māori choir and "John Kongos' squeaky chair." Mark Caro of The Chicago Tribune felt it showed Crowded House "mining new depths of texture in their sound", noting the balance between radio-friendly pop songs with moodier tracks boasting steel guitar effects ("Kare Kare") or "muted island beats" ("Private Universe").

Stephen Thomas Erlewine of AllMusic called the album "more experimental and musically varied than any of their previous releases", and said that it let "Crowded House energize their sound without losing sight of Finn's classic pop songwriting". Trouser Press noted the influence of the Beatles on several of the "ingratiating" album's songs and in its whimsical, ambitious production, as well its "decidedly New Zealandish spin", and stated that while the songs are not entirely happy, it is Crowded House's brightest album.

In 1995, Q included Together Alone in its publication "In Our Lifetime: Q's 100 Best Albums 1986–94", a list compiled to celebrate its 100th issue. Later, in 2011, the album ranked at number 231 in Q's readers poll of the "250 Best Albums of the Last 25 Years"; the magazine wrote that "Maori choirs add an experimental edge to Neil Finn's finest 40 minutes." Both Martin Rowsell and Nick Duerden of The Rough Guide to Rock (1999) and Martin C. Strong of The Great Rock Discography (2006) commented on the unlikely pairing of Crowded House and dance musician Youth. Naming it Crowded House's best album, Rowsell and Duerden noted how the band eschewed the British and American influences of prior albums for their New Zealand roots, and felt that Finn demonstrated both his "funny" and romantic sides, writing that "the songwriting shines through". Strong named it a "masterpiece" and "Crowded House's most experimental, profound and possibly finest effort", noting the "atmosphere of mystical calm and resolve" that shrouds the album, even the more rockier songs like "Locked Out" and "Distant Sun".

== Track listing ==
All tracks are written by Neil Finn, except where noted.

No.	Title	Writer(s)	Length
1.	"Kare Kare"	Finn, Mark Hart, Nick Seymour, Paul Hester	3:35
2.	"In My Command"		3:43
3.	"Nails in My Feet"		3:39
4.	"Black and White Boy"		4:00
5.	"Fingers of Love"		4:26
6.	"Pineapple Head"		3:27
7.	"Locked Out"		3:17
8.	"Private Universe"		5:39
9.	"Walking on the Spot"		2:54
10.	"Distant Sun"		3:49
11.	"Catherine Wheels"	Finn, Tim Finn, Seymour	5:12
12.	"Skin Feeling"	Paul Hester	3:56
13.	"Together Alone"	Finn, Hart, Ngapo 'Bub' Wehi	3:55
Total length:			51:32

A limited edition of the album in some territories featured a bonus disc of live tracks from their previous three albums:

1. "World Where You Live" – 5:30
2. "Mean to Me" – 4:06
3. "Sister Madly" – 5:42
4. "Better Be Home Soon" – 3:23
5. "It's Only Natural" – 3:52
6. "Weather with You" – 5:19

=== 2016 reissue ===
All tracks are written by Neil Finn, except where noted.

Original album
No.	Title	Writer(s)	Length
1.	"Kare Kare"	Finn, Mark Hart, Nick Seymour, Paul Hester	3:35
2.	"In My Command"		3:43
3.	"Nails in My Feet"		3:39
4.	"Black and White Boy"		4:00
5.	"Fingers of Love"		4:26
6.	"Pineapple Head"		3:27
7.	"Locked Out"		3:17
8.	"Private Universe"		5:39
9.	"Walking on the Spot"		2:54
10.	"Distant Sun"		3:49
11.	"Catherine Wheels"	Neil Finn, Tim Finn, Seymour	5:12
12.	"Skin Feeling"	Paul Hester	3:56
13.	"Together Alone" (*)	Finn, Hart, Ngapo 'Bub' Wehi	4:13
Total length:			51:50

Note

- * When compiling the deluxe edition a longer edited version of "Together Alone" was accidentally used, with additional chatter from the recording session at the end of the track included.

All tracks are written by Neil Finn, except where noted.

Disc 2 (Unreleased and rare material)
No.	Title	Writer(s)	Length
1.	"Blue Smoke" (home demo)		1:56
2.	"Fingers of Love" (writing demo)		1:02
3.	"Private Universe" (home demo)		2:22
4.	"The Same Language as Me" (live)		3:02
5.	"Tail of a Comet" (live)		4:14
6.	"Distant Sun" (writing demo)		0:43
7.	"I Am in Love" (band demo)		4:29
8.	"Fingers of Love" (band demo)		4:02
9.	"Fingers of Love" (alternative studio take)		5:11
10.	"Black and White Boy" (early rough mix)		5:06
11.	"Locked Out" (Zen Mix)		4:17
12.	"Newcastle Jam" (studio version)	Finn, Mark Hart, Nick Seymour, Paul Hester	3:45
13.	"Convent Girls"		3:24
14.	"Zen Roxy" (*)	Finn, Hart, Seymour, Hester	6:44
Total length:			50:10

Note

- * Previously released

== Personnel ==
=== Crowded House ===
- Neil Finn – vocals, acoustic and electric guitars, piano, keyboards
- Nick Seymour – bass, backing vocals
- Paul Hester – drums, percussion, vocals
- Mark Hart – keyboards, electric and acoustic guitars, lap steel guitar, mandolin

=== Additional musicians ===
- Eddie Rayner – keyboards on "Kare Kare" & "Pineapple Head"
- Noel Crombie – percussion on "Private Universe"
- Geoffrey Hales – percussion on "Fingers of Love" & "Locked Out"
- Tim Finn – backing vocals on "In My Command" & "Catherine Wheels"
- Sharon Finn – backing vocals on "Black and White Boy", "Fingers of Love" & "Private Universe"
- Dror Erez – accordion on "Walking on the Spot"
- Te Waka Huia Cultural Group Choir – vocals on "Together Alone", "In My Command" & "Catherine Wheels"
- Joe, Tereo, Martie, Jamee, Benjamin – log drummers on "Together Alone" & "Private Universe"
- Clyde Dixon, Stephen Bremner, Loren Astridge, David Bremner, Shaun Jarrett – brass band on "In My Command" & "Together Alone"

=== Production ===
- Youth – producer
- Bob Clearmountain – mixer
- Greg Hunter – engineer
- Nick Morgan, Graeme Myre, Angus Davidson, Chris Corr, Kalju Tonuma – additional engineering
- Dugald McAndrew – equipment & additional engineering
- Matt Austin – programming

== Charts ==
=== Weekly charts ===
Weekly chart performance for Together Alone
Chart (1993–94)	Peak position
Australian Albums (ARIA)	2
Canada Top Albums/CDs (RPM)	18
Dutch Albums (Album Top 100)	19
German Albums (Offizielle Top 100)	55
New Zealand Albums (RMNZ)	1
Norwegian Albums (VG-lista)	14
Scottish Albums (Official Charts)	12
Swedish Albums (Sverigetopplistan)	25
UK Albums (OCC)	4
US Billboard 200	73

=== Year-end charts ===
1993 year-end chart performance for Together Alone
Chart (1993)	Position
Australian Albums (ARIA)	60
New Zealand Albums (RMNZ)	32
UK Albums (OCC)	59

1994 year-end chart performance for Together Alone
Chart (1994)	Position
New Zealand Albums (RMNZ)	47

== Certifications ==
Certifications and sales for Together Alone
Region	Certification	Certified units/sales
Australia (ARIA)	Platinum	70,000^{^}
Canada (Music Canada)	Gold	50,000^{^}
United Kingdom (BPI)	Platinum	300,000^{^}
^{^} Shipments figures based on certification alone.
