= Fingers of Love =

Single by Crowded House

from the album Together Alone
- Released: 29 May 1994
- Genre: Rock
- Length: 4:27
- Label: Capitol
- Songwriter(s): Neil Finn
- Producer(s): Youth

Crowded House singles chronology
"Locked Out" (1994)	"Fingers of Love" (1994)	"Pineapple Head" (1994)

Music video
- "Fingers of Love" on YouTube

"Fingers of Love" is a song by Australian and New Zealand rock band Crowded House, released in May 1994 by Capitol Records as the fourth single from the group's fourth studio album, Together Alone (1993). The song peaked at number 25 on the UK Singles Chart. Its accompanying music video was directed by Stephen Johnson.

"Fingers of Love" was performed by the band on their farewell concert Farewell to the World in 1996. On the DVD special features for the concert, guitarist Mark Hart reports that it is his favourite song to play. He states this is because of the full sound of the song and also because he performs an extensive solo.

== Critical reception ==
Alan Jones from Music Week gave the song a score of four out of five, writing, "A subdued but admirable piece of work which rewards repeated plays by revealing its subtlety. It has a melancholic and hypnotic quality, and is performed with grace and style. Another hit."

== Track listings ==
Cassette single Live track recorded at The Boathouse, Norfolk, VA, 11 April 1994.

1. "Fingers of Love" – 4:27
2. "Nails In My Feet" (live)

UK CD1 Packaging contains lyrics to the first six songs of Together Alone. Live tracks recorded at The Boathouse, Norfolk, Virginia, 11 April 1994.

1. "Fingers of Love" – 4:27
2. "Skin Feeling" – 3:56
3. "Kare Kare" (live) – 3:16
4. "In My Command" (live) – 3:39

UK CD2 Packaging contains lyrics to the last seven songs of Together Alone. "Pineapple Head" recorded at The Tower Theatre, Philadelphia, April 1994. "Something So Strong" recorded at The Arlington Theatre, Santa Barbara, 18 March 1994.

1. "Fingers of Love" – 4:27
2. "Catherine Wheels" – 5:12
3. "Pineapple Head" (live) – 4:12
4. "Something So Strong" (live) – 3:39

UK 10-inch vinyl Tracks 1 and 3 were recorded at The Boathouse, Norfolk, Virginia, 11 April 1994, tracks 2 and 4 were recorded at The Arlington Theatre, Santa Barbara, California, 18 March 1994.

1. "Fingers of Love" (live)
2. "Love You Till the Day I Die" (live)
3. "Whispers and Moans" (live)
4. "It's Only Natural" (live)

== Charts ==
Chart (1994)	Peak position
UK Singles (OCC)	25
