= Four Seasons in One Day =

1992 single by Crowded House

Single by Crowded House

from the album Woodface
- Released: 8 June 1992
- Length: 2:50
- Label: Capitol
- Songwriters: Neil Finn, Tim Finn
- Producers: Mitchell Froom, Neil Finn

Crowded House singles chronology
"Weather with You" (1992)	"Four Seasons in One Day" (1992)	"Distant Sun" (1993)

"Four Seasons in One Day" is a song by Australian-New Zealand rock group Crowded House, released as a single in June 1992 by Capitol Records. It was co-written by Neil Finn and brother Tim Finn, originally intended for their debut Finn Brothers album; however, it was moved onto the Woodface project as the two projects amalgamated. The song's title references a common saying used in Melbourne to describe the city's changeable weather.

"Four Seasons in One Day" reached number 26 on the UK Singles Chart and number 47 on the Australian ARIA Singles Chart. The song also peaked at number 68 in Canada but was not released in the US. The song was later released on the group's greatest hits collection Recurring Dream and was performed at the group's farewell performance in 1996, Farewell to the World. After the death of Crowded House drummer Paul Hester, the Finn Brothers played the song in Hester's honour at their performances.

In 2005, a tribute album was created featuring a collection of Neil and Tim Finn's songs reinterpreted by female singers as the album She Will Have Her Way. "Four Seasons in One Day" was performed by Australian multi-instrumentalist Sally Seltmann, who was known by the stage name New Buffalo, under the shortened title of "Four Seasons".

== Inspiration ==
Neil Finn wrote the song in his flat in St Kilda East, a suburb of Melbourne. The song's title references a phrase used in Melbourne to refer to the city's changeable weather. Finn explained in an interview:

"Four seasons in one day" was a common Melbourne phrase, 'cause you go from a blazing hot, sunny day to raining and then it'd be hailing that night. [Tim Finn] and I were riding in emotional roller coasters a lot of the time and there was a lot of angst around that period. So it was a good description of the many moods of us collectively and individually.

== Music video ==
This was the first Crowded House video made in New Zealand. Director Kerry Brown and producer Bruce Sheridan wanted to emphasise the surreal, fantasy elements of the song, using distinctly Kiwi imagery. Locations included beaches and dense bush on the West Coast, the plains of Central Otago and the Victorian architecture of Oamaru. Scenes of an Anzac Day ceremony and marching girls also highlight the homeland setting. Brown took inspiration from Salvador Dalí paintings for the psychedelic effects that were added in post-production.

== Awards ==
In 2001 the song was voted by members of the Australasian Performing Right Association (APRA) as the 84th-best New Zealand song of the 20th century.

== Personnel ==
- Neil Finn – lead vocals, electric guitar, keyboards
- Tim Finn – piano, acoustic guitar, backing vocals
- Nick Seymour – bass guitar, backing vocals
- Paul Hester – drums, keyboards, backing vocals

== Track listings ==
- UK 7-inch and cassette single
1. "Four Seasons in One Day" – 2:48
2. "There Goes God" – 3:50
- UK CD single
1. "Four Seasons in One Day" – 2:48
2. "Dr. Livingston" – 3:57
3. "Recurring Dream" – 3:24 (remix from "Tequila sunrise soundtrack)
4. "Anyone Can Tell" – 3:36

Track 2; outtake from the Woodface sessions later to be released on "Afterglow", track 3: remix version from "Tequila sunrise" soundtrack, track 4; outtake from the Woodface sessions" previously released on the "Chocolate Cake" CD single and later to be released on "Afterglow".

- Alternate UK CD single

"Weather with You" and "Italian Plastic" were recorded at The Town & Country Club, London, 9 November 1991. "Message to My Girl" was recorded live at the Birmingham Town Hall on 5 March 1992 and not previously recorded by Crowded House.

1. "Four Seasons in One Day" – 2:48
2. "Weather with You" (live) – 6:17
3. "Italian Plastic" (live) – 3:28
4. "Message to My Girl" (live) – 3:05
- Australian CD

"There Goes God" was recorded in Maastricht, Netherlands.

1. "Four Seasons in One Day" – 2:48
2. "There Goes God" (live)
3. "Tall Trees" – 2:19
- Australian extended single

"Italian Plastic" was recorded at the State Theatre, Sydney. "Love You til the Day I Die", "It's Only Natural" and "Four Seasons in One Day" were recorded at the Newcastle Civic Theatre, Australia.

1. "Four Seasons in One Day" – 2:48
2. "Italian Plastic" (live) – 3:34
3. "Love You till the Day I Die" (live) – 4:50
4. "It's Only Natural" (live) – 4:27
5. "Four Seasons in One Day" (live) – 2:59

== Charts ==
Weekly chart performance for "Four Seasons in One Day"
Chart (1992)	Peak position
Australia (ARIA)	47
Canada Top Singles (RPM)	68
Europe (Eurochart Hot 100)	66
Netherlands (Dutch Top 40 Tipparade)	10
Netherlands (Single Top 100)	50
New Zealand (Recorded Music NZ)	33
UK Singles (Official Charts)	26
UK Airplay (Music Week)	14

== Certifications ==
Certifications and sales for "Four Seasons in One Day"
Region	Certification	Certified units/sales
Australia (ARIA)	Gold	35,000^{‡}
New Zealand (RMNZ)	Gold	15,000^{‡}
^{‡} Sales+streaming figures based on certification alone.

== Release history ==
Release dates and formats for "Four Seasons in One Day"
Region	Date	Format(s)	Label(s)	Ref.
United Kingdom	8 June 1992	7-inch vinyl; CD; cassette	Capitol	
Australia	6 July 1992	CD1	Capitol	
Australia	13 July 1992	CD2; cassette	Capitol	
