= Woodface =

Studio album by Crowded House
- Released: 1 July 1991 (UK); 8 July 1991 (Australia)
- Recorded: 1989–1991
- Studios: A&M (Los Angeles); Periscope (Melbourne); Ocean Way (Hollywood); Platinum (Melbourne)
- Genres: Pop rock; alternative rock; psychedelic pop
- Length: 48:11
- Label: Capitol
- Producers: Mitchell Froom; Neil Finn

Crowded House chronology
Temple of Low Men (1988)	Woodface (1991)	Together Alone (1993)

Singles from Woodface
- 1. "Chocolate Cake" Released: 27 May 1991; 2. "Fall at Your Feet" Released: August 1991; 3. "It's Only Natural" Released: 2 December 1991; 4. "Weather with You" Released: 17 February 1992; 5. "Four Seasons in One Day" Released: 8 June 1992

Professional ratings
Review scores
Source	Rating
AllMusic	4.5/5 stars
Chicago Tribune	3.5/4 stars
Classic Rock	8/10
Entertainment Weekly	B+
Los Angeles Times	2.5/5 stars
NME	6/10
Q	4/5 stars
Rolling Stone	3/5 stars
Select	3/5
Uncut	7/10

Woodface is the third studio album by Crowded House. The album was produced by Mitchell Froom and Neil Finn and was released by Capitol Records in July 1991. It features five singles: "Chocolate Cake", "Fall at Your Feet", "It's Only Natural", "Weather with You", and "Four Seasons in One Day". Woodface was a major hit in Australia and New Zealand as well as giving the band their first top ten hit album in the UK. It was listed at No. 3 in the book 100 Best Australian Albums in October 2010. It was voted number 80 in the third edition of Colin Larkin's All Time Top 1000 Albums (2000).

== Background ==
During a break from Crowded House following the Canadian leg of the tour in support of their second album, Temple of Low Men, band-leader Neil Finn began recording songs with his older brother and former Split Enz bandmate Tim Finn. These songs were originally intended for a Finn Brothers album. Once these sessions were complete, Neil teamed back up with Nick Seymour and Paul Hester to write and record Crowded House's third album. Capitol Records rejected most of the new Crowded House songs, so Neil asked Tim if the band could use some of the new Finn Brothers songs. Tim agreed, on condition that he would join the band, although he has since indicated he meant this as a joke. Whatever the truth of that claim, the group that returned to the studio included Tim as a full band member.

The album was titled Woodface and was released in July 1991. The cover was designed by Nick Seymour and Tommy Steele. It was co-produced by Mitchell Froom and Neil Finn, and mixed by Bob Clearmountain. Eight tracks were co-written by Neil and Tim Finn and mainly feature the brothers harmonising on lead vocals, although Neil takes the lead on "Four Seasons in One Day" and Tim sings "All I Ask", which later featured in AIDS awareness commercials in Australia. Five other tracks were solo compositions by Neil Finn and the remaining two were written by Paul Hester, including "I'm Still Here", a hidden track. Former Beach Boys drummer Ricky Fataar, and member of the Rutles, is credited on three of the Finn Brothers songs, "All I Ask", "There Goes God" and "Weather with You". The addition of Tim Finn and the inclusion of songs originally written for the Finn Brothers project gave the album a more upbeat and optimistic sound compared to its darkly personal predecessor, "represent[ing] the joy of reunion and the freedom of a collaborative effort", as Chris Woodstra of AllMusic remarked.

During the UK leg of the Woodface tour, Tim and the band parted company. Multi-instrumentalist Mark Hart, who had played some keyboards on Woodface, was recruited to replace Tim for the remaining dates. The final date of this tour at The Town & Country Club in London was recorded and given a limited release in Australia, while individual tracks were used as B-sides for the album's singles in other countries. The group described their work in the 2007 documentary Great Australian Albums.

== Music ==
Instrumentally, Woodface employs more acoustic guitar and less organ than on previous releases by Crowded House. The album also makes heavy use of vocal harmonies. The album's style has been characterized as pop rock, drawing comparisons to the works of John Lennon and Paul McCartney. Terry Staunton of Classic Rock described Woodface as "the sound of a band embracing the pop mainstream with bravado, while slyly biting the hand that feeds."

== Reception and legacy ==
Chris Woodstra of AllMusic gave the album four and a half stars out of five, saying: "Woodface represents the joy of reunion and the freedom of a collaborative effort. ... The songs are easily their finest to date, combining flawless melodies and the outstanding harmonies of the brothers' perfectly matched voices." The album was included in the 2005 book 1001 Albums You Must Hear Before You Die. Kate Taylor of Beat wrote: "Woodface will be remembered as bridging the gap between the Antipodes and the UK."

== Track listing ==
All tracks are written by Neil Finn and Tim Finn, except where noted.

No.	Title	Writer(s)	Length
1.	"Chocolate Cake"		4:02
2.	"It's Only Natural"		3:32
3.	"Fall at Your Feet"	N. Finn	3:18
4.	"Tall Trees"		2:19
5.	"Weather with You"		3:44
6.	"Whispers and Moans"	N. Finn	3:39
7.	"Four Seasons in One Day"		2:50
8.	"There Goes God"		3:50
9.	"Fame Is"	N. Finn	2:23
10.	"All I Ask"		3:55
11.	"As Sure as I Am"	N. Finn	2:53
12.	"Italian Plastic"	Paul Hester	3:39
13.	"She Goes On"	N. Finn	3:15
14.	"How Will You Go (includes a hidden excerpt of "I'm Still Here" (Hester, Neil Finn, Nick Seymour)"		4:14

"I'm Still Here" follows "How Will You Go" in track 14 as a hidden track at 3:37 after 30 seconds silence. The version released as a hidden track in 1991 is an excerpt containing the first minute of the full track, which appears on the 2016 deluxe edition of the album.

The following songs were recorded by Crowded House for Woodface before Tim Finn became involved but were not included on the album. Seven appeared on the 1999 rarities collection Afterglow; "Fields Are Full of Your Kind" and "My Legs Are Gone" appeared on the bonus disc to the deluxe edition. "My Legs Are Gone" had previously been released on I Like It Rare, a rarities compilation available through Frenz of the Enz, the official Crowded House fan club. "Fields Are Full of Your Kind" remained unreleased until the deluxe edition of Woodface.

- "Anyone Can Tell"
- "Left Hand"
- "Dr. Livingstone"
- "Sacred Cow"
- "I Love You Dawn"
- "My Telly's Gone Bung"
- "Time Immemorial"
- "Fields Are Full of Your Kind"
- "My Legs Are Gone"

Several songs initially recorded by Tim and Neil were temporarily considered for Woodface, but not used. "Catherine Wheels" would later be recorded for their next album, Together Alone (1993). "In Love With It All" and "Strangeness and Charm" would be recorded for Tim Finn's 1993 album Before & After, with Neil Finn accompanying.

- "Catherine Wheels"
- "In Love With It All"
- "Strangeness and Charm"
- "Prodigal Son"
- "Cemetery in the Rain"

=== 2016 reissue ===
Includes the original album for the first disc.

All tracks are written by Neil Finn, except where noted.

Disc 2 (Unreleased and rare material)
No.	Title	Length
1.	"Burnt Out Tree (Home Demo)"	1:36
2.	"I May Be Late (Home Demo)"	3:06
3.	"She Goes On (Home Demo)*"	3:13
4.	"As Sure As I Am (Home Demo)*"	2:37
5.	"My Legs Are Gone*"	4:33
6.	"You Got Me Going (Home Demo)"	3:23
7.	"Italian Plastic (Home Demo)*" (Paul Hester)	2:54
8.	"Be My Guest (Home Demo)"	2:03
9.	"Weather With You (Home Demo)*" (Neil Finn, Tim Finn)	3:08
10.	"Chocolate Cake (Home Demo)*" (Neil Finn, Tim Finn)	3:50
11.	"How Will You Go (Home Demo)*" (Neil Finn, Tim Finn)	2:46
12.	"It's Only Natural (Home Demo)*" (Neil Finn, Tim Finn)	3:21
13.	"Four Seasons in One Day (Home Demo)*" (Neil Finn, Tim Finn)	2:42
14.	"There Goes God (Home Demo)*" (Neil Finn, Tim Finn)	2:43
15.	"Catherine Wheel (Home Demo)*" (Neil Finn, Tim Finn)	3:00
16.	"All I Ask (Home Demo)*" (Neil Finn, Tim Finn)	2:43
17.	"Fields Are Full of Your Kind"	3:29
18.	"Creek Song / Left Hand" (Hester, Finn)	3:04
19.	"Fall at Your Feet (Rehearsal Early Version)"	3:22
20.	"The Burglar's Song (Medley) - Around the UK in 7 Minutes (Live) * #" (Neil Finn, Liam Finn, Eddie Rayner, Tim Finn, Paul Hester)	7:21
21.	"I'm Still Here (Full Version)" (Hester, Finn, Nick Seymour)	2:19

Notes

- * Previously released
- # features excerpts from "The Burglar's Song" (Neil Finn, Liam Finn), "Don't Dream It's Over" (Neil Finn), "When You Come" (Neil Finn), "Hole in the River" (Neil Finn, Eddie Rayner), "Money's No Object" (Tim Finn), "It's Only Natural" (Neil Finn, Tim Finn) and "Still Emotional" (Paul Hester).

== Personnel ==
Crowded House

- Neil Finn – guitar, vocals, keyboards
- Tim Finn – piano, guitar, vocals
- Paul Hester – drums, vocals, keyboards, percussion, lead vocal on "Italian Plastic"
- Nick Seymour – bass guitar, backing vocals

Additional musicians

- Mitchell Froom – keyboards
- Mark Hart – additional keyboards
- Stuart Ellison – additional keyboards (5)
- David Hidalgo – accordion (11)
- Ricky Fataar – drums and percussion (5, 8, 10)
- Alex Acuña – additional percussion
- Geoffrey Hales – additional percussion
- Chris Wilson – harmonica (1, 4, 8)
- Peter Bucknell – violin (8)
- Vince Parsonage – viola (8)
- Jack Mack – brass
- Jorge Calandrelli – string arrangements and conductor (10)
- Sharon Finn – backing vocals (10)

Production

- Neil Finn – producer
- Mitchell Froom – producer
- Tchad Blake – engineer
- Paul Kosky – engineer (Periscope Studios)
- Rob Jaczko – second engineer (A&M Studios)
- Andrew Horne – second engineer (Periscope Studios)
- Max Garcia – second engineer (A&M Studios / Record Plant)
- Bob Clearmountain – mixing (A&M Studios / Record Plant)
- Bob Ludwig – mastering (Masterdisk)
- Nick Seymour – art direction, cover painting
- Tommy Steele – art direction
- Dennis Keeley – photography
- Stephen Walker – design
- Timothy Eames – letter construction
- Brenda Bentley – costumes

== Charts ==
=== Weekly charts ===
Weekly chart performance for Woodface
Chart (1991–95)	Peak position
Australian Albums (ARIA)	2
Canada Top Albums/CDs (RPM)	20
Dutch Albums (Album Top 100)	12
German Albums (Offizielle Top 100)	26
New Zealand Albums (RMNZ)	1
Norwegian Albums (VG-lista)	13
Swedish Albums (Sverigetopplistan)	24
Swiss Albums (Schweizer Hitparade)	12
UK Albums (Official Charts)	6
US Billboard 200	82

=== Year-end charts ===
1991 year-end chart performance for Woodface
Chart (1991)	Position
Australian Albums (ARIA)	40
Canada Top Albums/CDs (RPM)	99
New Zealand Albums (RMNZ)	25

1992 year-end chart performance for Woodface
Chart (1992)	Position
Dutch Albums (Album Top 100)	36
New Zealand Albums (RMNZ)	9

== Certifications ==
Certifications and sales for Woodface
Region	Certification	Certified units/sales
Australia (ARIA)	Platinum	70,000^{^}
Canada (Music Canada)	Gold	50,000^{^}
Netherlands (NVPI)	Gold	50,000^{^}
United Kingdom (BPI)	2× Platinum	600,000^{^}
^{^} Shipments figures based on certification alone.
