= Mark Hart =

American musician (born 1953)

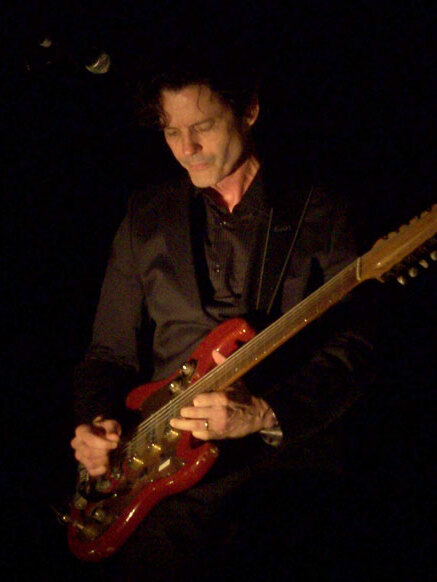
- Mark Hart on guitar with Crowded House, Boston, August 2007

Background information
- Born: July 2, 1953 (age 73); Fort Scott, Kansas, U.S.
- Genres: Rock, pop, film score
- Occupations: Musician, composer, producer
- Instruments: Vocals, guitar, keyboards, bass guitar, lap steel guitar
- Years active: 1982–present
- Formerly of: Supertramp; Crowded House
- Website: markhartmusic.com

Mark Hart (born July 2, 1953) is an American musician. He was a member of Supertramp (1986–1988, 1996–2002) and Crowded House (1993–1996, 2007–2016), and has also worked as a touring and session musician for Ringo Starr and others. Hart has also composed film scores and is a record producer.

== Biography ==
Hart was born on July 2, 1953 in Fort Scott, Kansas and grew up there. He has an older brother, Kelly, and an older sister, Millicent. From the age of seven years, Hart received piano lessons and followed by learning guitar some years later. Hart studied classical music at college and then worked as a full-time session musician with varied artists.

In 1982, Hart formed Combonation which issued its debut eponymous album in 1984 on Warner Bros. Records. Hart provided vocals, guitar and keyboards. The group split after the album failed commercially.

Hart began his association with British rock band Supertramp in 1986. At first, he served as a studio and touring musician, taking on the vocal and keyboard parts previously performed by Roger Hodgson. He provided guitar, keyboards, lead and backing vocals for Free as a Bird (1987) and participated in the ensuing tour.

Hart shared the same manager as pop-rockers Crowded House, who suggested he fill in for keyboardist Eddie Rayner with session work for the band. In 1991, Hart contributed to Woodface as a session musician, later joining the band as a touring member when Tim Finn departed. In 1993, Hart was credited as a full band member on Together Alone. He stayed with the band after founding drummer Paul Hester departed and appeared with the group's founders Neil Finn and Nick Seymour in the photographs from the sleeve for Recurring Dream, the 1996 greatest hits album. Hart played with the band during Farewell to the World, their November 1996 farewell concert on the steps of the Sydney Opera House.

In 1993, Hart contributed to the debut album Hang Out Your Poetry by Ceremony (see Chaz Bono), providing electric guitar, harmonium, Mellotron, organ, Hammond organ, piano, backing vocals, Wurlitzer and co-composing tracks. Also in 1993, Tim Finn issued his solo album, Before & After, with Hart and former Combonation bandmate Dudas providing instrumentation; Hart also co-produced two tracks with Finn.

Following the first demise of Crowded House, Hart joined Neil Finn for some of Finn's solo concerts supporting his debut solo album Try Whistling This in 1998. Later, Hart rejoined Supertramp—now as a full official member—for the recording of the studio albums Some Things Never Change (to which he also contributed as a writer) and Slow Motion as well as the live album It Was the Best of Times.

In 2001, Hart released his debut solo album, Nada Sonata.

Hart scored the motion pictures Life Among the Cannibals (1996) and Mockingbird Don't Sing (2001), both directed by Harry Bromley Davenport.

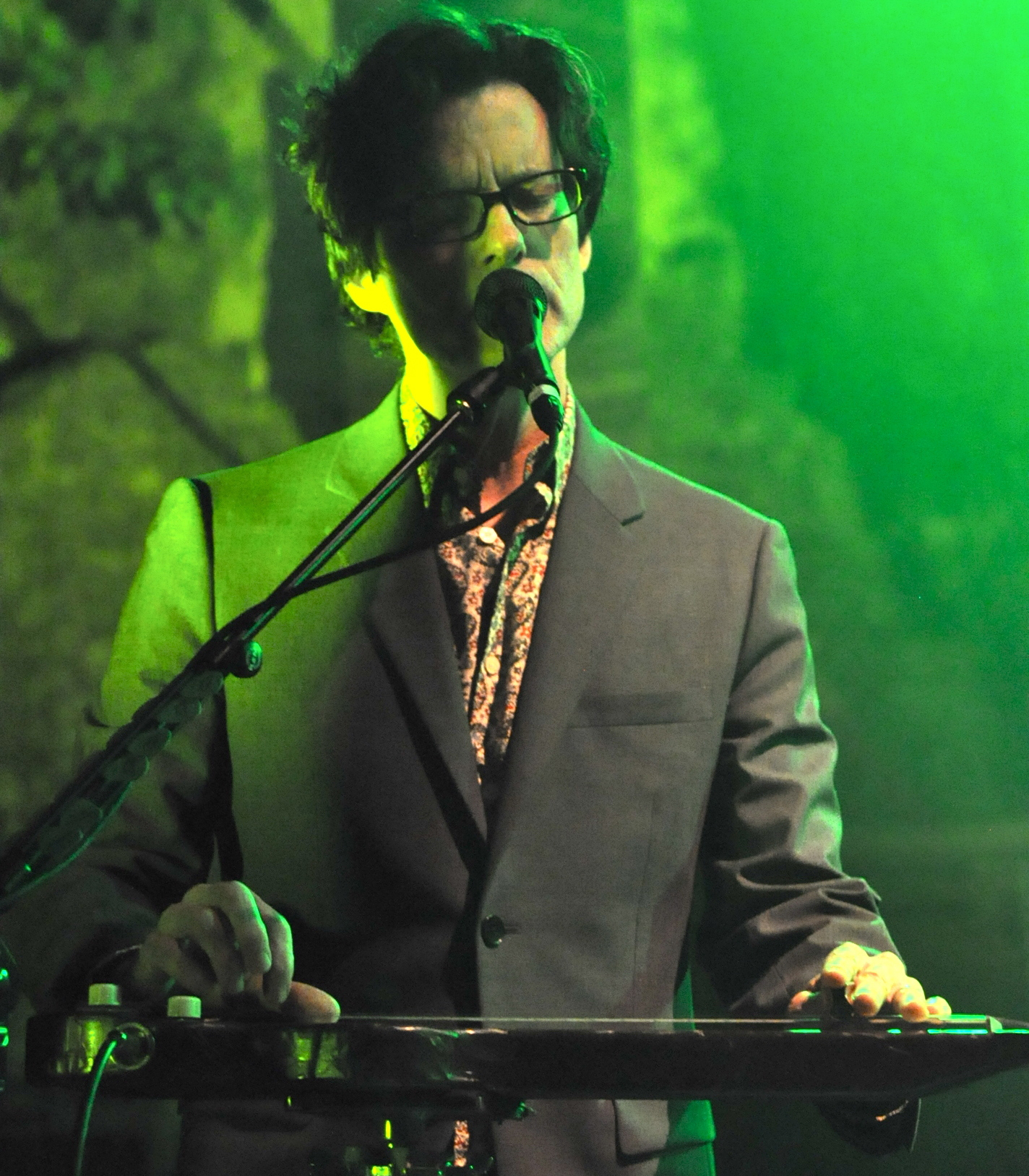
Hart on lap steel, September 2010.

Hart was a member of Ringo Starr’s backing band in the 2000s. Hart also contributed keyboards and piano to the 2006 debut album by Australian band Howling Bells.

In January 2007, Neil Finn announced the reformation of Crowded House with Hart, Nick Seymour, and a new drummer, Matt Sherrod (ex-Beck). They released a new album, Time on Earth and embarked on a year-long world tour. The album was initially intended to be Finn's third solo album, but was converted to a Crowded House album late in the sessions. As a result, Hart contributed on only four songs to the new album. He contributed to the next Crowded House album, Intriguer, which was released in June 2010. After 2010, Crowded House went on indefinite hiatus with the exception of a show in Sydney in 2016.

Hart's second solo album, The Backroom, appeared in 2014.

== Solo albums ==
Year	Title	Label
2002	Nada Sonata	PSB Records
2014	The Backroom	PSB Records
