= Private Universe =

1994 single by Crowded House

Single by Crowded House

from the album Together Alone
- Released: 31 October 1994 (Australia)
- Genre: Rock
- Length: 5:38 (album version); 3:59 (single version)
- Label: Capitol
- Songwriter: Neil Finn
- Producer: Youth

Crowded House singles chronology
"Pineapple Head" (1993)	"Private Universe" (1994)	"Everything Is Good for You" (1996)

"Private Universe" is a song by rock band Crowded House from their fourth studio album, Together Alone. It was released as a single in Australia in October 1994. The single peaked at number 46 on the Australian ARIA Singles Chart in January 1995 and spent 14 weeks in the top 100.

"Private Universe" is the only song to be featured on all of Crowded House's compilation and live albums (including the greatest hits compilation Recurring Dream, an acoustic mix version on the rarities compilation Afterglow, and on both live albums Special Edition Live Album and Farewell to the World).

== Reception ==
Junkee said, "the song may be among the quietest in their discography — which, rather than being easy to ignore, only makes you want to listen more intently. Doing so will lead you to its wafting keyboards, hypnotic tablas and Finn embracing these fleeting moments of unity while he’s able."

== Track listing ==
Live tracks were recorded at The Boathouse (Norfolk, Virginia) on 11 April 1994. "I Am in Love" was previously unreleased in Australia and later appeared on Afterglow. The single sleeve contains complete lyrics to Together Alone which, notably, the album does not contain.

Standard CD single

1. "Private Universe" (radio edit) – 3:59
2. "Nails in My Feet" (live) – 4:38
3. "In My Command" (live) – 3:40
4. "Whispers and Moans" (live) – 4:40
5. "I Am in Love" – 4:36

== Charts ==
Chart (1994–1995)	Peak position
Australia (ARIA)	46
Belgium (Ultratop 50 Flanders)	40
