= Distant Sun =

1993 single by Crowded House

Single by Crowded House

from the album Together Alone
- B-side: "Walking on the Spot" (live); "When You Come" (live); "Skin Feeling"; "Weather with You"
- Released: 20 September 1993
- Genre: Indie rock
- Length: 3:51
- Label: Capitol
- Songwriter: Neil Finn
- Producers: Youth; Crowded House

Crowded House singles chronology
"Four Seasons in One Day" (1992)	"Distant Sun" (1993)	"Nails in My Feet" (1993)

Music video
- "Distant Sun" on YouTube

"Distant Sun" is a song by Australian band Crowded House, released in September 1993 by Capitol Records as the first single from their fourth studio album, Together Alone (1993). The song gave the band another top-20 hit in the United Kingdom, peaking at number 19, but fell shy of the mark in Australia, reaching number 23. It was a top-five hit in Canada and New Zealand, reaching numbers four and five, respectively. In March 1994, a remixed version of "Distant Sun" was released in the United States, reaching number 26 on the Billboard Modern Rock Tracks chart. The regular mix was not released as a single in the US and was only available on the album. The accompanying music video was directed by Canadian director and artist Curtis Wehrfritz.

A live version of "Distant Sun" was included on the single for "Locked Out", another single from Together Alone; this version was recorded at Hammersmith Apollo, England on 12 November 1993. In 2005, a tribute album titled She Will Have Her Way was created featuring a collection of Neil and Tim Finn's songs reinterpreted by female singers; "Distant Sun" was performed by New Zealand singer-songwriter Brooke Fraser. Fraser's version is mostly similar to the original version, but the key was changed to suit her voice, and she omitted the line "Like a Christian fearing vengeance from above".

== Critical reception ==
Upon the release, Larry Flick from Billboard magazine wrote, "Ace songwriter Neil Finn works his usual melodic miracles here, combining swoony guitar work with a solid hook. The sparkling result, from band's current Together Alone set, offers PDs an opportunity to fill radio's gaping guitar pop void—and judging from this single's stellar sound, there's no better band than Crowded House for the job."

== Track listings ==
As the lead single from Together Alone, "Distant Sun" was released in various versions internationally. All songs, including B-sides, were written by Neil Finn unless otherwise noted.

- Australian CD single
1. "Distant Sun" – 3:50
2. "Walking on the Spot" (live) – 2:55
3. "When You Come" (live) – 6:23
4. "Skin Feeling" (Paul Hester) – 3:56
5. "Weather with You" (live) – 5:26

Note: All live tracks were recorded at The Town & Country Club, London on 9 and 10 November 1991.

- UK CD single

Disc one

1. "Distant Sun" – 3:51
2. "This Is Massive" (Hester) – 3:55 (live)
3. "When You Come" – 6:16 (live)

Disc two

1. "Distant Sun" – 3:51
2. "Walking on the Spot" – 2:54
3. "Throw Your Arms Around Me" (Hunters & Collectors cover; written by Mark Seymour) – 3:54 (live)
4. "One Step Ahead" – 3:52 (live)

Note: All live tracks were recorded at The Roxy, Los Angeles, 26 February 1987. "Distant Sun" and "Walking on the Spot" are from the Together Alone album.

- Dutch CD single
1. "Distant Sun"
2. "Don't Dream It's Over" (live at the King Biscuit Flower Hour, 24 March 1987)
- Dutch CD single
1. "Distant Sun" – 3:51
2. "Walking on the Spot" – 2:54
3. "Throw Your Arms Around Me" (Hunters & Collectors cover; written by Seymour, Archer, Crosby, Falconer, Howard, Miles, Waters) – 3:54 (live)
4. "One Step Ahead" – 3:52 (live)

Note: All B-sides recorded live at The Roxy, Los Angeles, 26 February 1987 except "Walking on the Spot" which is the Together Alone album version.

- US CD single
1. "Distant Sun" (remix version) – 3:45
2. "Pineapple Head" – 3:54 (live)
3. "Locked Out" – 3:38 (live)

Note: Live tracks were recorded at Munich, Germany, 12 December 1993.

== Charts ==
=== Weekly charts ===
Chart (1993–1994)	Peak position
Australia (ARIA)	23
Canada Top Singles (RPM)	4
Europe (Eurochart Hot 100)	57
Europe (European Hit Radio)	17
Germany (GfK)	70
Israel (Israeli Singles Chart)	19
Netherlands (Dutch Top 40 Tipparade)	9
New Zealand (Recorded Music NZ)	5
UK Singles (Official Charts)	19
UK Airplay (Music Week)	4
US Bubbling Under Hot 100 Singles (Billboard)	13
US Modern Rock Tracks (Billboard)	26
US Cash Box Top 100	82

=== Year-end charts ===
Chart (1994)	Position
Canada Top Singles (RPM)	34

== Certifications ==
Certifications and sales for "Distant Sun"
Region	Certification	Certified units/sales
Australia (ARIA)	Platinum	70,000^{‡}
New Zealand (RMNZ)	Platinum	30,000^{‡}
^{‡} Sales+streaming figures based on certification alone.
