= Everything Is Good for You =

1996 single by Crowded House

Single by Crowded House

from the album Recurring Dream
- Released: 1996
- Length: 3:57
- Label: Capitol
- Songwriter(s): Neil Finn
- Producer(s): Mitchell Froom; Neil Finn; Tchad Blake

Crowded House singles chronology
"Private Universe" (1994)	"Everything Is Good for You" (1996)	"Instinct" (1996)

"Everything Is Good for You" is a song by Australian rock group Crowded House. It was the first single released from the group's greatest hits compilation, Recurring Dream. It peaked at number ten on the Australian ARIA Singles Chart.

== Track listing ==
1. "Everything Is Good for You"
2. "History Never Repeats" (live in Auckland 24 March 1995) – Pearl Jam with the Finn Brothers
3. "Chocolate Cake" (live in Newcastle, Australia 20 March 1992 (not 1996 as stated on sleeve) – begins with a live rendition of "Rocky Raccoon" by the Beatles
4. "Into Temptation" (live in Sheffield, U.K. 21 June 1992)

== Charts ==
Chart (1996)	Peak position
Australia (ARIA)	10
