= Weather with You =

1992 single by Crowded House

- Australian CD single artwork

Single by Crowded House

from the album Woodface
- Released: 17 February 1992
- Studio: Periscope (Melbourne)
- Length: 3:45
- Label: Capitol
- Songwriters: Neil Finn; Tim Finn
- Producers: Mitchell Froom; Neil Finn

Crowded House singles chronology
"It's Only Natural" (1991)	"Weather with You" (1992)	"Four Seasons in One Day" (1992)

Alternative cover
- US CD single artwork

"Weather with You" is a song by Australian-New Zealand rock band Crowded House. It was the third and most successful single released from the group's third studio album, Woodface (1991), released in February 1992 by Capitol Records. It reached top 50 in 10 countries, including the United Kingdom, where it reached number seven. The accompanying music video was directed by MacGregor Knox. At the APRA Music Awards of 1994, the song won Most Performed Australian Work Overseas. The song was intended to be part of the Finn Brothers' planned 1990 debut, but after Capitol Records expressed interest in the recordings, they were included on what became Woodface alongside tracks recorded for Crowded House.

In 1996, Crowded House disbanded, releasing a greatest hits album, Recurring Dream, in June of that year. "Weather with You" was made the album's first track. Later in the year, the band reunited for one final performance at the Sydney Opera House and performed the song again, calling upon ex-member Tim Finn, who originally performed the song with the group, to join the group onstage. This live performance was not included on the VHS release of the concert, but it was shown on television broadcast and also appeared on the 10-year anniversary DVD entitled Farewell to the World.

== Background ==
On his website, Neil Finn explained:

The first day we got together, we wrote "Weather with You" and [Tim Finn] had the title and the chorus line. 'Everywhere you go you always take the weather with you', and the opening line, 'Walking round the room singing stormy weather'. We started playing that and got the guitar riff going and wrote the whole thing on the first day, so it got off to a good start. 57 Mount Pleasant Street is a fictitious address as far as the number goes, but my sister used to live in a house in Mount Pleasant Road in Auckland and that’s what we were thinking of when we wrote the song. It was just a good contrast to the theme of the song for it to be called Mount Pleasant Street because really it was about a guy who's totally wrapped up in melancholia standing in his lounge room feeling lost.

He went on to say, "Ultimately, the theme of the song is of course, that you are creating your own weather, you are making your own environment, always."

== Critical reception ==
Andrew Mueller from Melody Maker wrote that songs like "Weather with You" "tout pleasingly wry sentiments but are entirely bereft of any hooks upon which to hang your heart." Another music critic, Peter Paphides, complimented the way Neil Finn could write a song like this and "make it seem like a postcard from a dream." Alan Jones from Music Week praised it as "splendid".

In 2025, the song placed 69 on the Triple J Hottest 100 of Australian Songs.

== Music video ==
The music video for "Weather with You" was filmed after Tim Finn's departure.The video, directed by MacGregor Knox (Director of I'm Talking's "Holy Word"), features the remaining members, Neil Finn, Paul Hester and Nick Seymour, at various beaches on the Bellarine Peninsula (including Queenscliff and Portarlington), driving in cars including a Fiat 600 Multipla towing a small "Sports Minor" caravanette and a Ford Thunderbird "Bullet Bird" convertible.

The music video features a slightly rearranged song structure, with a chorus placed before the second verse and some of the instrumental sections shortened.

== Legacy ==
In 2001, "Weather with You" was voted 16th-best New Zealand song of all time by APRA and featured on Nature's Best.

== Personnel ==
Crowded House

- Neil Finn – electric guitar, lead vocals
- Tim Finn – acoustic guitar, backing vocals
- Nick Seymour – bass guitar, backing vocals
- Paul Hester – backing vocals

Additional musicians

- Mitchell Froom – keyboards
- Stuart Ellison – keyboards
- Ricky Fataar – drums, percussion
- Alex Acuña – additional percussion
- Geoffrey Hales – additional percussion

== Track listings ==
- UK 7-inch vinyl and cassette
1. "Weather with You" (single edit) - 4:17
2. "Into Temptation" - 4:35
- Australian and UK CD
1. "Weather with You" (single edit) - 4:17
2. "Mr. Tambourine Man" (Bob Dylan) (live) - 2:35
3. "Eight Miles High" (Gene Clark, Jim McGuinn and David Crosby) (live) - 4:50
4. "So You Want to Be a Rock 'n' Roll Star" (Jim McGuinn, Chris Hillman) (live) - 2:49

Note: Live tracks recorded with Roger McGuinn at the Pantages Theater, Los Angeles, 7 April 1989, previously released on "I Feel Possessed" CD and 12" single.

- Australian and UK alternative CD
1. "Weather with You" (radio edit) - 3:46
2. "Fall at Your Feet" (live) - 6:59
3. "When You Come" (live) - 6:22
4. "Walking on the Spot" (live) - 3:23

Note: Live tracks recorded at The Town & Country Club, London, 9–10 November 1991, exclusive to this release

- Belgian "Rock Torhout Werchter" CD
1. "Weather with You" (single edit) – 4:17
2. "Into Temptation" (live) – 4:43
3. "Don't Dream It's Over" (live) – 4:27
4. "Recurring Dream" (original Version) – 2:59

Note: Limited edition. Live tracks recorded at Ancienne Belgique, Brussels, Belgium, 24 February 1992, exclusive to this release.

- Dutch "Outlaw Remixes" CD
1. "Weather with You" (Remix full version)
2. "Weather with You" (Remix full version without Tim Finn)
3. "Weather with You" (Single mix. No breakdown)
4. "Weather with You" (Neil Finn's Edit)

Note: The "Outlaw Remixes", mixed at Platinum Studios, Melbourne. Produced and remixed by The Outlaw.

- Japanese CD
1. "Weather with You" – 4:02
2. "Walking on the Spot" (live) – 4:13
3. "Don't Dream It's Over" (live) – 5:53
4. "Something So Strong" (live) – 4:02
5. "Mr. Tambourine Man" (live) – 2:35

Note: "Walking on the Spot" recorded at The Town & Country Club, London, 10 November 1991 (previously unreleased in Japan); "Don't Dream It's Over" recorded at The Roxy, Los Angeles, 26 February 1987; "Something So Strong" recorded at The Trocadero, Philadelphia, 24 March 1987; "Mr. Tambourine Man" recorded with Roger McGuinn at the Pantages Theater, Los Angeles, 7 April 1989 (however, label indicates 7 July 1989 incorrectly).

- US CD single
1. "Weather with You" (Radio Edit) - 3:46
2. "Walking on the Spot" (live)
3. "Don't Dream It's Over" (live)
4. "Better Be Home Soon" (live)
5. "World Where You Live" (live)

Note: All live tracks recorded at The Town & Country Club, London, England, 9–10 November 1991. "Walking on the Spot" was previously unreleased in the US.

== Charts ==
=== Weekly charts ===
Chart (1992)	Peak position
Australia (ARIA)	27
Belgium (Ultratop 50 Flanders)	9
Canada Top Singles (RPM)	34
Europe (Eurochart Hot 100)	26
France (SNEP)	30
Germany (GfK)	23
Ireland (IRMA)	19
Israel (Israeli Singles Chart)	6
Netherlands (Dutch Top 40)	11
Netherlands (Single Top 100)	10
New Zealand (Recorded Music NZ)	9
Switzerland (Schweizer Hitparade)	8
UK Singles (Official Charts)	7
UK Airplay (Music Week)	3

=== Year-end charts ===
Chart (1992)	Position
Belgium (Ultratop)	60
Germany (Media Control)	60
Switzerland (Schweizer Hitparade)	18
UK Singles (OCC)	78
UK Airplay (Music Week)	31

== Certifications ==
Region	Certification	Certified units/sales
Australia (ARIA)	4× Platinum	280,000^{‡}
Denmark (IFPI Danmark)	Gold	45,000^{‡}
New Zealand (RMNZ)	4× Platinum	120,000^{‡}
United Kingdom (BPI)	Platinum	600,000^{‡}
^{‡} Sales+streaming figures based on certification alone.

== Release history ==
Region	Date	Format(s)	Label(s)	Ref.
United Kingdom	17 February 1992	7-inch vinyl; CD1; cassette	Capitol	
United Kingdom	24 February 1992	CD2	Capitol	
Australia	13 April 1992	CD1; cassette	Capitol	
Australia	27 April 1992	CD2	Capitol	
Japan	13 May 1992	Mini-album	Capitol	

== Cover versions and live performances ==
In 2001, Neil and Tim Finn performed the song during the week-long concert series that was captured on the CD/DVD 7 Worlds Collide.

In 2006, Jimmy Buffett covered "Weather with You" and used it as the namesake for his album Take the Weather with You.

In 2009, a re-recorded version featuring Tim, Neil and Liam Finn appeared on the Tim Finn retrospective North, South, East, West...Anthology.

In 2011, a recording by Hollie Smith was included on the compilation album They Will Have Their Way.

In 2015, the song was included in the soundtrack of the film Everest (2015).
