= Nick Seymour =

Australian bassist (born 1958)

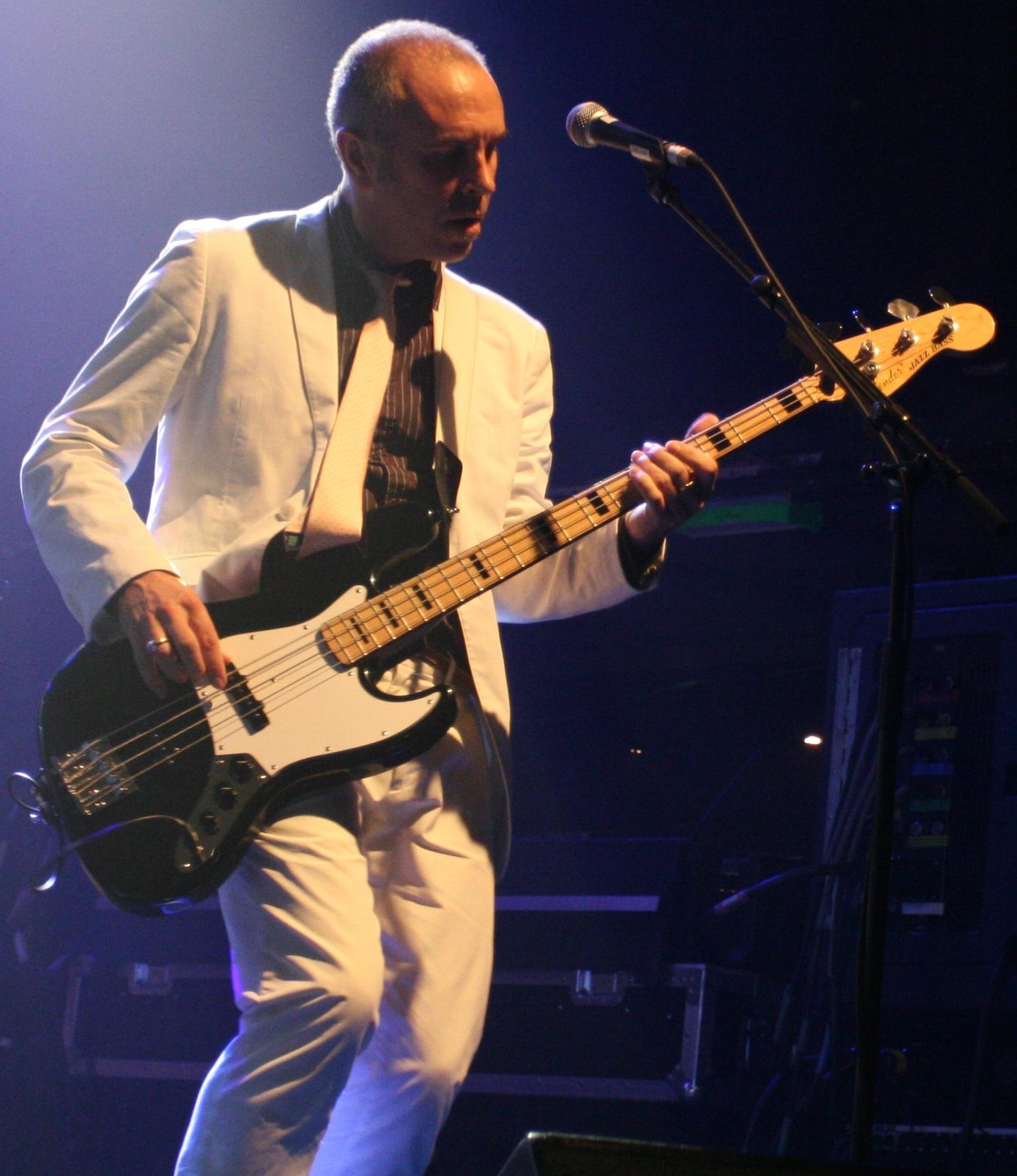
- Seymour in Crowded House in 2007

Background information
- Birth name: Nicholas More Seymour
- Born: 9 December 1958 (age 66) Benalla, Victoria, Australia
- Origin: Melbourne, Victoria, Australia
- Genres: Alternative rock, rock
- Occupation(s): Musician, songwriter, record producer
- Instrument: Bass guitar
- Years active: 1979–present

Nicholas More Seymour (born 9 December 1958) is an Australian musician and record producer. He is the founding bass guitarist and a mainstay of the rock group Crowded House, and is the younger brother of Mark Seymour, singer-songwriter-guitarist in the rock band Hunters and Collectors.

== Biography ==
Nicholas Seymour has two older sisters, Hilary and Helen, and an older brother, Mark (born 1956). His mother encouraged all four children to learn musical instruments and sing. When he was a young boy they all toured country Victoria, as the Seymour Family Singers. In 1972 the family moved to Melbourne, where Nick attended Yarra Junction Primary School. He taught himself to play bass guitar. After finishing secondary education he studied Visual Arts at a tertiary institute.

Seymour was a member of various local bands, starting with The Glory Boys in 1979, then The Romantics in the next year, and Scratch Record Scratch. In 1981 he became the bassist in Plays with Marionettes, which had formed in 1980 with Robin Casinader on drums, piano and Hammond organ, Edward Clayton-Jones on guitar and vocals (ex-Fabulous Marquises), and Hugo Race on lead vocals and guitar. The group performed an "aggravating style of jazzy no-wave noise" and broke up in February 1984. Their recordings include one side of a shared single, "Witchen Kopf" (1982), and "Hellbelly" which appeared on a various artists' compilation, This is Hot (1984). Seymour, Casinader, Clayton-Jones and Brian McMahon (keyboards) formed a group called The Horla, but it had disbanded by the end of 1984. Soon after Casinader and Clayton-Jones formed the Wreckery.

Seymour also worked as a set designer of films including, The Leonski Incident (1984), and on the TV series, Carson's Law. At the end of 1984, he auditioned with "a long line of bass players" to become a founding member of The Mullanes alongside Neil Finn on lead vocals and Paul Hester on drums (both ex-Split Enz). Seymour had played to a taped series of tracks previously recorded by Finn and Hester. The group formed early in the next year and included Craig Hooper on lead guitar (ex-The Reels). Hooper left the group and remained behind in Melbourne when the remaining trio travelled to Los Angeles to start recording sessions, where they were renamed, Crowded House.

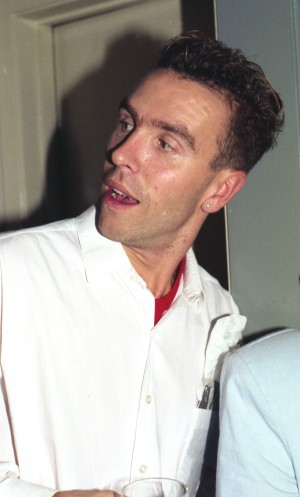
Seymour at Wolfgang's nightclub, San Francisco, 1987

As a member of Crowded House, Seymour provides bass guitar, backing vocals and song writing, as well as artwork for album covers, costumes and stage sets. With their second album, Temple of Low Men (July 1988), he won the ARIA Music Awards of 1989 category for Best Cover Art. He was nominated for the same award for Crowded House (June 1986) in 1987, Woodface (July 1991) in 1992, and Together Alone (October 1993) in 1994. In early 1989, after a tour of Australia and Canada, Finn fired Seymour from Crowded House. According to music journalist, Ed Nimmervoll, Seymour's departure was due to Finn blaming him for causing the latter's writer's block. However Finn cited "artistic differences" as the reason. Seymour said that after a month apart, he contacted Finn and they agreed that he would return to the band. He subsequently stayed with the group until their disbandment in 1996.

In 1986 Seymour, Finn and Hester were also members of The Rock Party, a charity project for The National Campaign Against Drug Abuse (NCADA), which included many fellow Australasian musicians including Finn's older brother, Tim Finn; GANGgajang members Geoff Stapleton, Robbie James and Mark Callaghan; Models members Jenny Morris and Sean Kelly; Reg Mombassa (Mental As Anything), Eddie Rayner (ex-Split Enz), Mary Azzopardi (Rockmelons), Andrew Barnum (Vitabeats), Lissa Barnum, Michael Barclay, Peter Blakeley, Deborah Conway, Danny De Costa, Greg Herbert (The Promise), Spencer P Jones, John Kennedy, Paul Kelly, Robert Susz (Dynamic Hepnotics) and Rick Swinn (The Venetians). The Rock Party released a 12" three-track single "Everything to Live For", which was produced by Joe Wissert, Phil Rigger and Phil Beazley. In 1990 Seymour and Hester joined Chris Bailey Combo with Bailey on lead vocals (ex-The Saints), Dror Erez, Tony Norris and Chris Wilson.

After Crowded House separated in November 1996, Seymour joined former bandmate Peter Jones (who had replaced Hester in 1994) in a pop rock band, deadstar. That group had been formed in August 1995, as a side project, by Jones (drums and percussion), Caroline Kennedy (lead vocals and guitar), and former Hunters & Collectors member Barry Palmer (lead guitar and, initially, bass guitar). With Seymour aboard they toured the United Kingdom and recorded their second album, Milk (August 1997). At that time, Seymour had worked on his brother Mark's debut solo album, King Without a Clue (October 1997), alongside bandmates Jones and Palmer. Seymour left deadstar at the end of 1997.

Seymour moved to Dublin and produced the debut album, Neither Am I (October 2000), for Irish band Bell X1. He also helped establish Irish bands, Juno Falls and Vesta Varro, as well as recording a rock band, The Walls. In 2003, he re-teamed with Hester to form another group, Tarmac Adam.

Following Hester's death in 2005, Seymour reconnected with Finn and performed on the latter's third studio album. Over time, that project morphed into the fifth Crowded House album. In 2007, Neil Finn, Mark Hart and Nick Seymour reformed Crowded House, adding Matt Sherrod as drummer. The album Time on Earth was released in June 2007 and the group started a world tour in support of it.

Crowded House also released Intriguer in 2010. It reached #1 on the Australian charts.

Seymour composed the score for the 2012 documentary The Summit. In 2013 he guested, along with Pete Ruotolo, Steven Mogerly, Conor Murray and Hot House Flower Liam Ó Maonlaí on Rónán Ó Snodaigh's album of songs in Irish, Sos. The band was called The Occasionals. He also played bass on the 2013 "Sticky Wickets" album by Irish band The Duckworth Lewis Method.

=== Personal life ===
Nick Seymour was married to Brenda Bentleigh in 1989 but they separated in 1993. In 1997 or 1998 Seymour moved to Dublin, where he had bought a home. He later established a recording studio, Exchequer Studios, with Brian Crosby of Bell X1 and producer Rob Kirwan. As of 2021, Seymour and his Australian-born partner live in Sligo. They have two children, both born in Ireland.
