= Paul Hester =

Australian musician (1959–2005)

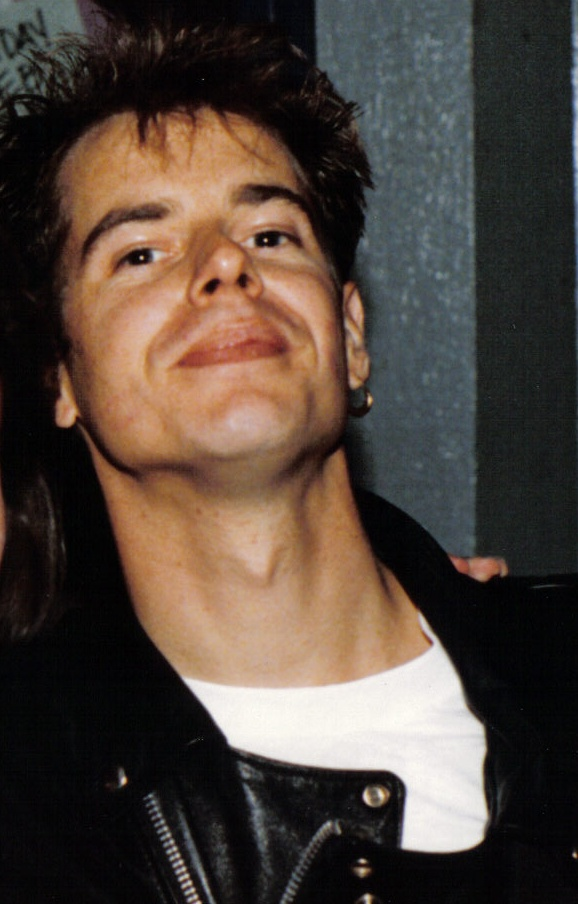
- Hester in a Crowded House photoshoot

Background information
- Also known as: Hessie
- Born: Paul Newell Hester; 8 January 1959; Melbourne, Victoria, Australia
- Died: 26 March 2005 (aged 46) Brighton, Victoria, Australia
- Genres: Rock, pop rock, jangle pop, indie rock, alternative rock, new wave
- Occupation: Musician
- Instruments: Drums, percussion, vocals, keyboards
- Years active: 1976–2005
- Formerly of: Crowded House, Split Enz, Deckchairs Overboard, Tarmac Adam, The Wiggles, The Holy Toledos

Paul Newell Hester (8 January 1959 – 26 March 2005) was an Australian musician and television personality. He was the drummer for the band Split Enz from November 1983 until their break-up in December 1984. Hester was also a co-founding member of the band Crowded House, for which he served as drummer.

== Early years ==
Hester was the elder of two children (his younger sister is Carolyn). He was born in Melbourne, Victoria, the son of a bushman father and jazz drummer mother. At an early age he was encouraged by his mother to play drums. His extrovert personality did not impress his teachers, and he left school early and attempted various jobs before starting a musical career. Some of the Melbourne bands he played in from 1976 to 1978 included Thunder and Edges. In 1979 he co-founded a Melbourne-based band called Cheks (renamed Deckchairs Overboard when they moved to Sydney in 1982).

He lived with Deborah Conway of Do-Ré-Mi during the early 1980s, while playing regularly in Love Party. Hester later worked with Conway in Rose Amongst Thorns (1990–1991) and Ultrasound (1995).

== Split Enz and Crowded House ==
=== Split Enz ===
At the departure of drummer Mal Green from Split Enz in 1981, their percussionist Noel Crombie took up the role of drummer. After the release of the Enz album Time and Tide in 1982, the band took a break to focus on other projects. According to the radio documentary Enzology, when they reformed in mid-1983, both Finn brothers returned somewhat distracted. Tim Finn had just released the very successful solo album Escapade, while younger brother Neil Finn had a child on the way.

The reunion resulted in Conflicting Emotions (November 1983), an album which marked the beginning of the end for the band. Before the tour to support the album it was decided that Crombie would return to percussion (something he says he enjoyed more than drumming), and the band would find a new drummer. Hester was auditioned on the advice of Rob Hirst of Midnight Oil and got the job. In May 1984, founder Tim Finn left Split Enz, and they released See Ya 'Round in November, which included "This is Massive" which was written by Hester. When Split Enz disbanded in December, Hester and Neil Finn decided to start a new group.

=== Crowded House ===
Initially, the new band formed by Hester and Neil Finn was named "the Mullanes" and then underwent a few name changes. They recruited Nick Seymour to play bass guitar and Craig Hooper on guitar, Hooper left as they secured a recording contract with Capitol Records in the US. However, Capitol disliked the name and the band changed to Crowded House to record their debut eponymous album, Crowded House in 1986. Other records by Crowded House with Hester are: Temple of Low Men (1988), Woodface (1991), Together Alone (1993), and the Best-of collection Recurring Dream (1996).

By 1993, Hester was frustrated by the demands of his career and suffered a phobia about leaving to go on tour. On his return to Australia that year, he started to see a psychiatrist. He remained with Crowded House until 1994, when the pressure of touring and the birth of his first daughter made him want to stay home, rather than remain on the road. Hester left mid-way through a 1994 tour of America, forcing the band to recruit British drummer Peter Jones for the rest of the tour. Hester performed with Crowded House at the band's farewell concert on the forecourt of the Sydney Opera House in 1996. As of 2021, Crowded House have sold well over 20 million albums. In November 2016, the band and all of its original members (including Hester) were inducted into the ARIA Rock & Roll Hall of Fame.

== After Crowded House ==
Towards the end of his time with Crowded House, Paul produced The Holy Toledos' second album, Blood, and played drums on its first single. It was on his recommendation the band was picked up by Sony.

After leaving Crowded House, Hester appeared on many TV and radio shows in Australia and opened a cafe/restaurant named Beach House Cafe with fellow Melbourne musician Joe Camilleri in Elwood Beach in Melbourne. From 1995 until 1998, Hester appeared regularly on the popular Australian radio show Martin/Molloy. He collaborated with John Clifforth, a former Deckchairs Overboard bandmate and long time friend, in the early 2000's on Craven's Pharmacy where he played drums and instruments on multiple songs. He played drums as a session musician for producer Richard Pleasance. One of his final recordings was Sophie Koh's debut album All the Pretty Boys.

Hester also briefly worked with the popular Australian children's music group The Wiggles in 1998, playing drums on their album Toot Toot! and making a guest appearance on their video Yummy Yummy as Paul the Cook.

During Hester's time with The Wiggles, he also played drums for Australian musician and Yellow Wiggle at the time Greg Page's solo and debut self-titled album in 1998.

=== Largest Living Things ===
Hester later became involved in a new band called Largest Living Things (1997–2000), with Kevin Garant on guitar and Barry Stockley on bass, performing with members of rock groups Crowded House, Split Enz, Midnight Oil, and others. Largest Living Things released a few EPs in Australia featuring songs written and sung by Hester; in contrast to his previous work in Crowded House, Hester played guitar as well as drums. The Largest Living Things featured on Mick Molloy's controversial 1999 TV show The Mick Molloy Show, with Hester as bandleader. Hester co-founded Tarmac Adam with former Crowded House bandmate Nick Seymour and Matt O'Donnell, Sean McVitty and Steve Paix in 2001, which released their debut album Handheld Torch in 2003.

=== Hessie's Shed ===
In 1998, Hester hosted his own 10-part TV series Hessie's Shed on Australian Broadcasting Corporation (ABC). This show gave Hester the room to explore his humorous presenter skills, showcase some friends, reunite with friends from Crowded House, and play with the house band, Largest Living Things, with Hester now performing from behind the drums and on the guitar.

=== The MAX Sessions ===
Hester went on to host the intimate concerts The MAX Sessions. Broadcast on MAX, these intimate concerts, which were mainly recorded at the Sydney Opera House, featured a variety of local and international acts. A highlight of the show's concerts saw Hester reunite with former bandmates Neil Finn and Tim Finn for a few songs, backing them on drums, while they were promoting their album Everyone Is Here.

== Personal life ==
Hester was in a relationship with Deborah Conway from Do-Re-Mi in the early 1980s. He later formed a relationship with photographer Mardi Sommerfeld and they had two daughters. They lived in the suburb of Elwood in Melbourne, Victoria. Hester split from Sommerfeld around 2001.

== Death and commemorations ==
On 26 March 2005, at age 46, Hester died by suicide at Elsternwick Park in Brighton, Melbourne, near his home. It was known to family and close friends that he had been suffering from depression for a few years prior to his death, and was prone to mood swings. Hester was buried at Blackwood in the Central Highlands region of Victoria.

His life was commemorated at the 2005 ARIA Music Awards, with Neil Finn singing the Crowded House anthem "Better Be Home Soon" along with a mini-biography and footage from his life and achievements. In October 2005, in memory of Hester and to acknowledge his long links with the area, the local Port Phillip Council agreed to name a path alongside the Elwood Canal, the Paul Hester Walk, after him.

Hester's girlfriend at the time of his death was New Zealand-based singer Kashan Vincent. In July 2006, Vincent sued his estate, claiming a third of his net worth. Vincent claimed the pair had a relationship for 32 months and, while not cohabiting, were engaged, but had called off their wedding. By May 2007, the lawsuit was resolved out of court, with Vincent receiving a payout, and Hester's two daughters named as the sole beneficiaries of their father's estate.

In 2007, a reformed Crowded House dedicated its album Time on Earth to Hester, with the song 'She Called Up' inspired by his death.
