= List of funk rock and funk metal bands =

This list includes bands that have played within the funk rock and funk metal genres. It also includes bands described as metal funk, thrash funk or funkcore (synonymous with funk metal), as well as bands described as punk-funk (synonymous with both genres).

== Artists ==
- 24-7 Spyz
- 311
- 3rdeyegirl
- Bang Tango
- Bloodhound Gang
- Bootsauce
- Chad Smith's Bombastic Meatbats
- Cement
- Clutch
- Dan Reed Network
- Deli Creeps
- Electric Boys
- Extreme
- Faith No More
- Fishbone
- Follow for Now
- Funkadelic
- Gang of Four
- Guano Apes
- Hot Action Cop
- Incubus
- Infectious Grooves
- INXS
- Jane's Addiction
- Jimmie's Chicken Shack
- Korn
- L.A.P.D.
- Labelle
- Living Colour
- Lucy Brown
- Maroon 5
- Maximum The Hormone
- Mind Funk
- Mordred
- Mother's Finest
- Mr. Bungle
- Parliament
- Parliament-Funkadelic
- Pilgrims
- Praxis
- Primus
- Psychefunkapus
- Psychostick
- Pylon
- Rage Against the Machine
- The Rasmus (early)
- Red Hot Chili Peppers
- Republic of Loose
- The Revolution
- Rollins Band
- Royal Crescent Mob
- Scatterbrain
- Sly and the Family Stone
- Snot
- Spymob
- Sugar Ray
- Super Junky Monkey
- Supergroove
- Sweaty Nipples
- Talking Heads
- The Time
- Ugly Kid Joe
- Urban Dance Squad
- Vova Nova
- Wild Cherry

== See also ==
- Funk rock
- Funk metal
- Punk funk
- List of funk musicians
