= Dreamers Are Waiting =

Studio album by Crowded House
- Released: 4 June 2021
- Recorded: 2020
- Studios: Valentine; United Recording; Roundhead; various home studios in Los Angeles and Ireland
- Genre: Jangle pop
- Length: 41:53
- Label: EMI Australia
- Producer: Crowded House

Crowded House chronology
The Very Very Best of Crowded House (2010)	Dreamers Are Waiting (2021)	Gravity Stairs (2024)

Singles from Dreamers Are Waiting
- 1. "Whatever You Want" Released: 29 October 2020; 2. "To the Island" Released: 17 February 2021; 3. "Playing with Fire" Released: 13 May 2021; 4. "Sweet Tooth" Released: 28 January 2022

Professional ratings
Aggregate scores
Source	Rating
Metacritic	75/100
Review scores
Source	Rating
AllMusic	4/5 stars
American Songwriter	3.5/5 stars
Clash	7/10
Evening Standard	3/5 stars
The Guardian	4/5 stars
The Irish Times	3/5 stars
Sputnikmusic	3.6/5
The Sydney Morning Herald	4/5 stars

Dreamers Are Waiting is the seventh studio album by Australian rock band Crowded House, released on 4 June 2021 through EMI Music Australia. It is their first studio album since 2010's Intriguer, with the band reuniting with producer Mitchell Froom, who is now also the band's keyboardist, for the first time since Recurring Dream (1996). It is also Crowded House's first album with Neil Finn's sons Liam and Elroy as members of the group.

The album was preceded by the singles "Whatever You Want", released in October 2020, "To the Island" in February 2021, and "Playing with Fire" in May 2021.

Crowded House embarked on the To the Island tour of New Zealand in March 2021. The group have announced plans to tour the UK and Europe in support of the album in 2022.

At the 2021 ARIA Music Awards, the album won Best Adult Contemporary Album.

== Background and recording ==
Neil Finn stated that he wanted to wait until there was a "fresh and authentic way to re-approach" recording as Crowded House, as he was "afraid of just repeating the same formulas". The album was primarily recorded in Los Angeles before the 2020 COVID-19 lockdowns, but was finished remotely.

== Track listing ==
All tracks are written by Neil Finn except where stated. Track 6 is mistakenly attributed to Liam in the liner notes.

Dreamers Are Waiting track listing
No.	Title	Writer(s)	Length
1.	"Bad Times Good"	Neil Finn; Liam Finn; Elroy Finn; Nick Seymour	3:41
2.	"Playing with Fire"	N. Finn; L. Finn; E. Finn; Seymour; Mitchell Froom	3:27
3.	"To the Island"		3:59
4.	"Sweet Tooth"		3:12
5.	"Whatever You Want"		3:22
6.	"Show Me the Way"		3:43
7.	"Goodnight Everyone"	L. Finn	3:30
8.	"Too Good for This World"	N. Finn; Tim Finn	3:39
9.	"Start of Something"	L. Finn; N. Finn	3:20
10.	"Real Life Woman"		3:48
11.	"Love Isn't Hard at All"	E. Finn; N. Finn	3:02
12.	"Deeper Down"		3:10
Total length:			41:53

== Personnel ==
- Neil Finn – vocals, guitars, piano, keyboards, percussion
- Liam Finn – guitar, vocals, drums
- Elroy Finn – drums, vocals, guitar, keyboards
- Nick Seymour – bass, vocals, keyboards
- Mitchell Froom – keyboards

== Charts ==
=== Weekly charts ===
Weekly chart performance for Dreamers Are Waiting
Chart (2021)	Peak position
Australian Albums (ARIA)	2
Belgian Albums (Ultratop Flanders)	12
Dutch Albums (Album Top 100)	12
German Albums (Offizielle Top 100)	16
Irish Albums (Official Charts)	23
New Zealand Albums (RMNZ)	2
Scottish Albums (Official Charts)	4
Swiss Albums (Schweizer Hitparade)	27
UK Albums (Official Charts)	6

=== Year-end charts ===
Year-end chart performance for Dreamers Are Waiting
Chart (2021)	Position
Australian Artist Albums (ARIA)	44
