= She Called Up =

Single by Crowded House

from the album Time on Earth
- A-side: "She Called Up"
- B-side: "So Dramatic"
- Released: 17 September 2007
- Recorded: 2007
- Genre: Mellow rock
- Length: 2:54
- Label: Parlophone
- Songwriter: Neil Finn
- Producer: Steve Lillywhite

Crowded House singles chronology
"Don't Stop Now" (2007)	"She Called Up" (2007)	"Pour Le Monde" (2007)

"She Called Up" is the second single released from Crowded House's fifth studio album Time on Earth, released on 17 September 2007. The song was inspired by Paul Hester's passing.

== Overview ==
"She Called Up" was written by Crowded House leader and main songwriter Neil Finn and was intended as a solo effort, but as his third album was converted into the new album for his band Crowded House, the song was released as a Crowded House offering. "She Called Up" is one of only four from the fourteen tracks from Time on Earth that includes the full lineup of Finn, bassist Nick Seymour, guitarist/keyboardist Mark Hart and newcomer drummer Matt Sherrod as Crowded House. Observations have been made that the song resembles Finn's songwriting of the Split Enz era.

== Music video ==
The music video, directed by English director Robert Hales (known for his work on the music video for the songs "Crazy" by Gnarls Barkley and "Look What You've Done" by Jet), is set in a small theatre where a class of children stand up on the stage on tiered platforms singing the song. The camera periodically zooms in and out of selected children who are shown playing instruments and singing along to the song.

== Track listing ==
All songs were written by Neil Finn.

1. "She Called Up" – 2:54
2. "So Dramatic" – 3:38
3. "People Are Like Suns (Piano version)" – 3:52
4. "She Called Up" (video)

== Personnel ==
- Neil Finn - Guitars and vocals
- Mark Hart - Piano and backing vocals
- Nick Seymour - Bass guitars and backing vocals
- Matt Sherrod - Drums and percussion
