= Handheld Torch =

Studio album by Tarmac Adam
- Released: 2003
- Recorded: Melbourne, Dublin
- Genre: Pop
- Length: 41:26
- Label: Onesize Records
- Producer: Nick Seymour

Handheld Torch is the debut album by Melbourne band Tarmac Adam. It was released in 2003 and featured two former Crowded House members, bassist Nick Seymour and drummer Paul Hester. The album was produced by Seymour.

The album began as a solo production by singer-songwriter Matt O'Donnell, who took time off work as an occupational therapist to record some of a set of 25 songs he had written. He recruited guitarist Sean McVitty and drummer Hester, who in turn introduced O'Donnell to Seymour. Seymour began producing the album and in mid-2002 returned with O'Donnell to his Dublin base to work on vocals, where the set list was reduced to 10 songs. On their return to Melbourne, the project was joined by multi-instrumentalist Steve Paix and in January 2003 the album was mixed by US engineer Rob Feaster.

The album was funded by O'Donnell after approaches to record companies by Seymour for a recording deal were rebuffed. O'Donnell explained: "I got to a certain age where I was working as a public servant for long enough and thought I'd like to make another record and make it in a certain way. I borrowed the money to do it."

Seymour said: "On this record when I started working with Matt and Sean, we had songs that were the basis of the record realised. I sent them out to all these A&R guys and record company stiffs that I had known over the years and got absolutely no reply. I followed up with phone calls and they'd say they weren't interested or weren't signing anything. I realised that because of the digital age you make your own records in the back garden and do a lease deal. It is a real drag but that's what you have to do. You have to come up with the money yourself to get Pro-Tools and the good speakers for your spare room. It is part of the DJ culture but a lot of kids who don't have money don't get money thrown at them anymore. It means the ones coming up the ranks are predominantly middle-class to upper-class kids."

== Track listing ==
All tracks are written by Matt O'Donnell, additional songwriters are noted below

No.	Title	Writer(s)	Length
1.	"Too Much Time"	Steve Paix; Joe O'Donnell; Nick Seymour	3:22
2.	"Secret"		4:12
3.	"Rest Easy"	Joe O'Donnell	3:12
4.	"Sentimental Holiday"	Steve Paix; Nick Seymour	3:36
5.	"Blind"		4:20
6.	"Handheld Torch"	Nick Seymour	4:29
7.	"Vice or Virtue"	Steve Paix	5:05
8.	"Vanity Eyes"	Steve Paix; Joe O'Donnell	4:51
9.	"Let It Go"		4:22
10.	"Swim"	Steve Paix	3:54
Total length:			41:26

== Personnel ==
- Matt O'Donnell – vocals, guitars, piano, keyboards, trumpet, percussion
- Nick Seymour – bass, piano, keyboards, percussion, backing vocals
- Sean McVitty – guitars
- Paul Hester – drums, percussion
- Steve Paix – keyboards, saxophone, tin whistle, backing vocals

Additional musicians:

- Michelle Wood, Ash Wood, Zolton Balazs, Lisa Reybolds, Phillip Healy – strings
- Ken Murray – nylon string guitar
- Ken Stephenson – lap steel
- Pui – percussion
- Brian Crosby – mellotron
- Lawrence Maddy – trombone, melodica
- Christopher Coe – programming
