= Vova Nova =

American funk band

- Origin: Birmingham, Alabama, U.S.
- Genres: Funk rock
- Years active: 1978–1990s
- Label: Chameleon
- Members: Glen Butts, Milton Davis, Libba Walker, Mark Lanter

Vova Nova was an American funk rock band from Birmingham, Alabama, originally formed as Forecast in 1978. Its two founding members were Glen Butts and Libba Walker; Mark Lanter joined the band as its drummer in 1980, and Milton Davis followed as bassist in 1984. By the late 1980s, the band had changed its name to the Cast, and in 1991, they signed with Chameleon Records, which was taken over by Elektra Records the following year. The band subsequently changed their name to Vova Nova at the insistence of their publisher. They released one album as Vova Nova on Chameleon in 1992; the self-titled album was produced by Paul Ebersold. Their later musical style was notably influenced by the music of the Red Hot Chili Peppers. After releasing Vova Nova, the band's record deal ended, whereupon they renamed themselves "the Cast" again. Soon afterward, Davis left the band because he had written I Know, a song performed by Dionne Farris, and Lanter soon followed suit. In 1993, Lanter was replaced by the band's new drummer, Leif Bondarenko, and the band continued to play into the mid-1990s.

== Reception ==
A 1990 Spin story described Vova Nova as "probably Birmingham's best" band. Robert Christgau reviewed their self-titled 1992 album unfavorably, giving it a "neither" rating. In a 1992 review of one of the band's performances in the Times-Picayune, Scott Aignes wrote that "At first blush, Vova Nova sounds like Godflesh imitating the Red Hot Chili Peppers imitating Heart. But the tightness and exuberance of their sound makes this more than just another funk-metal-pop mishmash."

== Discography ==
- Vova Nova (Chameleon, 1992)
