= Time on Earth =

Studio album by Crowded House
- Released: 29 June 2007
- Recorded: 2006–2007
- Studios: Roundhead, Auckland; RAK, London (2, 3, 6, 12); Real World, Wiltshire
- Genres: Pop rock, jangle pop, soft rock
- Length: 58:31
- Labels: ATO (US/Canada); Parlophone (world); Lester/Kobalt (remaster)
- Producers: Ethan Johns; Steve Lillywhite

Crowded House chronology
| Farewell to the World (2006) | Time on Earth (2007) | Intriguer (2010) |

Singles from Time on Earth
- 1. "Don't Stop Now" Released: 16 June 2007; 2. "She Called Up" Released: 17 September 2007; 3. "Pour Le Monde" Released: 10 December 2007

Time on Earth is the fifth studio album by Australian rock band Crowded House. Tracks were produced by Ethan Johns and Steve Lillywhite and the album was released on 30 June 2007 in Australia, 2 July in the United Kingdom and 10 July in North America. Time on Earth was the band's first studio album since 1993, released eleven years after they disbanded. Drummer Matt Sherrod replaced Paul Hester, who died in 2005.

As the first studio album from the group in fourteen years, Time on Earth was subject to much speculation. Upon its release the album garnered positive critical reception and quickly reached Platinum status in Australia, and Gold status in New Zealand.

To promote the album, the group toured internationally, beginning at Coachella music festival and at Live Earth in July. Three singles were released from the album, "Don't Stop Now", "She Called Up" and "Pour le monde". A special tour edition of the album was released in Australia in November 2007, with an extra CD featuring eleven songs recorded during the band's North American tour.

== Album history ==
=== Background ===
The album was originally intended to be frontman Neil Finn's third solo release. In the wake of Paul Hester's death, as well as preparations for the release of the live album Farewell to the World, the band members were drawn together and their friendship was reinvigorated. In 2006, Neil Finn invited bassist Nick Seymour to participate in the recording of his new album and subsequent tour. In the initial phase, various session musicians filled parts, such as studio musician Joey Waronker on drums and British soul singer Beth Rowley provided backup vocals for the song "Transit Lounge." After recording a complete album with Ethan Johns in the producer and drummer's seat and Seymour contributing substantially throughout the process, Finn decided Crowded House would reform and that Time on Earth would be the band's fifth studio album. The title Time on Earth takes its name from a song of the same name that was not included in the album.

With new drummer Matt Sherrod and returning multi-instrumentalist Mark Hart now involved as members of the official line-up, the band returned to the studio to record four additional tracks with producer Steve Lillywhite. Hart and Sherrod also contributed retroactively to some of the material produced by Ethan Johns. In its final form, the album features tracks mixed by Johns, Lillywhite and Tchad Blake. Guitarist Johnny Marr was involved in the recording of "Even a Child", which he co-wrote, and "Don't Stop Now".

=== Recording and production ===
Due to the transient nature of the album, gradually adapting from a solo venture into a band effort, the recording process used was somewhat unorthodox in that it encompassed various session musicians for the majority, while the "central line-up" of Finn, Seymour, Hart and Sherrod only performed on four tracks, which includes "Don't Stop Now", the album's lead single, and "She Called Up", the following single. Before this point, most of the album was produced by Ethan Johns; however, from enlisting Sherrod and calling upon Hart to return, the prolific producer Steve Lillywhite took over.

=== Release ===
To bring their music to the public before the album's release, the group played together a few times before the release. On 17 March 2007 the band played a 2 ½ hour set streamed live to the internet from veteran musician Peter Gabriel's studio (Real World Studios) in England. In this performance, there were eight new songs featured, beginning with Finn's co-written piece with the Dixie Chicks "Silent House" and also including "Pour le monde" ("For the world"), "Transit Lounge", "She Called Up" and "Don't Stop Now".

Prior to the album's release, a single was released. The song "Don't Stop Now" was selected, as it featured the new line-up of the band. The single received moderate success in the charts. A follow-up single, "She Called Up", was released in September 2007.

The album had a staggered release internationally across a fortnight, beginning in Australia, while the final location of its release was with the United States. Following the Australian release, the group performed at Live Earth in Australia, performing many of the album's songs, and also on various television programs, along with many interviews, such as on Rove and Enough Rope with Andrew Denton. A special live version of Crowded House performing "Silent House" was made available for Australian and UK purchasers of the album by inserting the disc into their computer and downloading the song from the internet. The song features the advertised album line-up, including new drummer Matt Sherrod and returning member of Crowded House Mark Hart, neither of whom were on the studio version.

In the UK, Time on Earth became the band's highest charting studio album, debuting at number three on the UK Albums Chart with sales of 27,799.

=== Critical reception ===
Professional ratings
Review scores
| Source | Rating |
|---|---|
| AllMusic | 4/5 stars |
| The A.V. Club | B+ |
| The Observer | 4/5 stars |
| Pitchfork | 7.2/10 |
| PopMatters | 7/10 discs |
| The Scotsman | 3/5 stars |
| Spin | 3.5/5 stars |
| The Times | 3/5 stars |
| Uncut | 4/5 stars |
| USA Today | 3.5/4 stars |

The album has been very well received by critics, with Hal Horowitz of Amazon.com praising the album as "a worthy successor to Crowded House's existing catalog". Liam Gowing of A.V. Club indicated that in "Text, context and subtext, Hester's passing seems to color every line, even those generic enough to be about anything."

== Cover art ==
The stylised text for the band's name from the cover of Time on Earth

As he did for the first four Crowded House albums, Nick Seymour, also an artist, created the cover art for Time on Earth. The group's name "Crowded House" appears with jumbled case, some lower and some upper case, appearing as "cRoWdED HOusE". Similarly, the album title is also in a partial jumble with all but the last two letters in upper case, appearing as "TIME ON EARth."

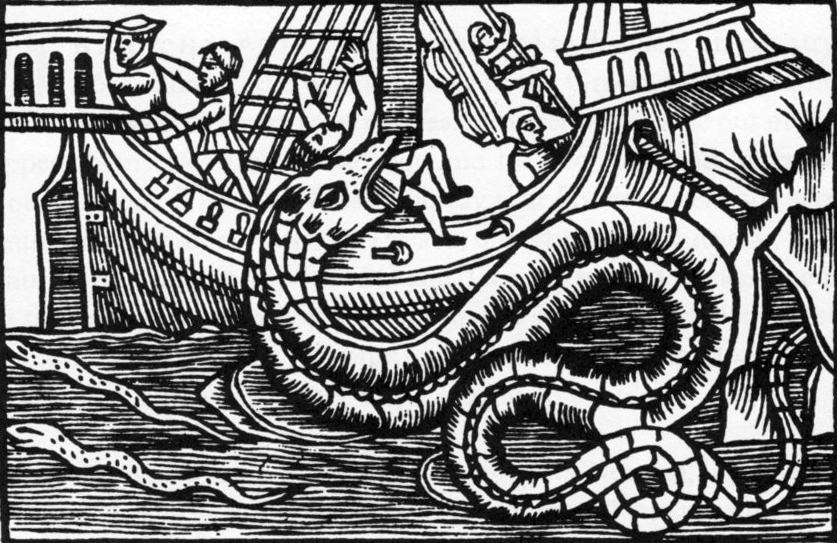
A sea serpent from Olaus Magnus's book History of the Northern Peoples (1555).

The cover also features a blue dragon eating a human, the design of which was a direct reference to the sea serpent image from Olaus Magnus's book History of the Northern Peoples. The use of a dragon eating a man is to symbolise former member Hester being consumed by depression, symbolised by the dragon being blue, and this brought his time on earth to an early end. The cover art is almost completely composed of newspaper cuttings collaged together, even the image of the man and the dragon are newspaper cuttings which Seymour painted onto. Only the tree on the right, and the title text are not composed of newspaper cuttings. The tree is to pose as a simile for the tree under which Hester took his life in 2005.

In November 2007, a special edition of Time on Earth was released featuring a colour altered cover. The cover's main background area, which was previously a sandy-wheat colour, was converted into an aqua-teal colour, while the tree in the image had a bird in a nest added to it.

== Musical style ==
According to Neil Finn, "It (Time on Earth) doesn't sound like any one particular Crowded House album, but it has elements of Crowded House... in as much as Nick and I make a sound together when we play and always did. I think there's a lot of heart and spirit in the album which is connected with the loss of our dear friend Paul but also an attempt to try and make sense of it and move forward. And as such, it seemed the most obvious and best way to do that was to be playing music again with each other, Nick and I. I want to be in a band and what other band could it be." Crowded House's leader, Neil Finn has indicated that, as the album began life as a solo project, its sound is generally different from Crowded House, though similar in parts, indicating that no one album by the group sounds like this one. As the album is dedicated to Hester and attends to his death, much of the album has a mournful tone, however this has been received well by critics, with some indicating that "fortunately, Finn is a master at expressing ambiguity, (both) lyrically and musically". Finn has said of the song "People Are Like Suns", that "Part of it is the idea that people burn brightly and then they fade out. Also, when I wrote it, I was reading Ian McEwan's novel Saturday, which begins with a man on his balcony watching his plane go down, so the first lines borrow something from that image."

The song "Pour le monde" ("For the World" in French) was inspired when Finn was in Paris and observed a demonstration march protesting against the war on terror, with the chant "Pour le monde pas pour la guerre", which translates to "For the world, not for the war" (which is then sung in English directly after the French on the song). Seymour adds that the song contains "a lot of nobility and integrity" and that when they have performed the song it "really does stand upright". The last song recorded for the album, "Transit Lounge", is written about time spent in various transit lounges around the world, particularly Singapore and Bangkok.

Lyrically, Andy Strickland of Yahoo! Music asserts that the album's song "English Trees" shows Finn's "brilliant weaving of a tale of loss and yearning marks him out as up there with the very best songwriters working today" and of the album's musical structure as a whole, comments that it is a "collection of songs that reflect Finn's usual palette of singalong pop ("She Called Up"), achingly fine ballads ("Pour le monde"), and darker, more ambient sounds ("A Sigh")".

Jessica Letkemann of Billboard points out that, to those unfamiliar with Finn's solo work, expecting the album to resemble a prior Crowded House work would be surprised, insisting that "Gone are the more overtly '80s top 40 flourishes". Bud Scoppa writes in Uncut Magazine that the album's extremes are portrayed in its first two songs, "Nobody Wants To", which he describes as "[setting] the prevailing melancholy mood, as Finn's slide guitar hovers like a solitary seabird over a vocal laced with regret", and "Don't Stop Now", in which "Finn explores the metaphorical possibilities of the GPS, seeking "something I can write about... something I can cry about".

== Track listing ==
In April 2007, the band's website went live and included a confirmation of the track listing of Time on Earth. Notably, the album has 14 tracks, only the second studio album by Crowded House to have as many, the previous being Woodface. The album features the guitar work of Johnny Marr, guitarist and songwriter of The Smiths, on "Even a Child" and lead single "Don't Stop Now;" Marr co-wrote the former song with Finn. The album also includes the song "Silent House", which Finn co-wrote with the Dixie Chicks (which also appeared on their 2006 Grammy-winning album Taking the Long Way). With the Australian and UK release, the CD unlocks an online exclusive download of a live version of the song "Silent House". Early releases of the album in the UK included an additional DVD. Following touring, on 3 November 2007, a special edition was released in Australia featuring a colour-altered cover and an extra CD featuring eleven songs from the 8 September 2007 performance at Winnipeg, Manitoba, Canada, for the North American leg of the Time on Earth tour.

All tracks are written by Neil Finn, except where noted.

| No. | Title | Length |
|---|---|---|
| 1. | "Nobody Wants To" | 4:10 |
| 2. | "Don't Stop Now" | 3:54 |
| 3. | "She Called Up" | 2:53 |
| 4. | "Say That Again" | 5:21 |
| 5. | "Pour le monde" | 5:10 |
| 6. | "Even a Child" (Finn, Johnny Marr) | 3:57 |
| 7. | "Heaven That I'm Making" | 3:56 |
| 8. | "A Sigh" | 3:17 |
| 9. | "Silent House" (Finn, Martie Maguire, Natalie Maines, Emily Robison) | 5:52 |
| 10. | "English Trees" | 3:43 |
| 11. | "Walked Her Way Down" | 4:17 |
| 12. | "Transit Lounge" | 4:25 |
| 13. | "You Are the One to Make Me Cry" | 3:43 |
| 14. | "People Are Like Suns" | 3:52 |

The tracks "Lost Island" and "Stare Me Out" are available on the vinyl version of this album. They are also available as b-sides to "Don't Stop Now", and as bonus tracks via digital music providers.

=== Limited edition DVD ===
Limited Edition Time on Earth DVD

1. "Locked Out" (Live Real World Sessions Webcast)
2. "Something So Strong" (Live Real World Sessions Webcast)
3. "World Where You Live" (Live Real World Sessions Webcast)
4. Time on Earth Interview*
  - "Hotel California"
  - "Transit Lounge"
  - "Pour Le Monde"
5. Crowded House images (with "Don't Stop Now" audio)
- *Now available on official Crowded House website.

=== Australian live disc ===
1. "Mean to Me" – 3:31
2. "World Where You Live" – 3:28
3. "Don't Stop Now" – 3:46
4. "Hole in the River" – 7:33
5. "Don't Dream It's Over" – 4:20
6. "Silent House" – 6:26
7. "Walked Her Way Down" – 4:22
8. "Something So Strong" – 3:39
9. "Weather with You" – 4:28
10. "Private Universe" – 5:56
11. "You Are the One to Make Me Cry" – 4:22

== 2016 Deluxe Edition ==
=== Disc 1 (Original album) ===
All tracks are written by Neil Finn, except where noted.

| No. | Title | Length |
|---|---|---|
| 1. | "Nobody Wants To" | 4:10 |
| 2. | "Don't Stop Now" | 3:54 |
| 3. | "She Called Up" | 2:53 |
| 4. | "Say That Again" | 5:21 |
| 5. | "Pour le monde" | 5:10 |
| 6. | "Even a Child" (Finn, Johnny Marr) | 3:57 |
| 7. | "Heaven That I'm Making" | 3:56 |
| 8. | "A Sigh" | 3:17 |
| 9. | "Silent House" (Finn, Martie Maguire, Natalie Maines, Emily Robison) | 5:52 |
| 10. | "English Trees" | 3:43 |
| 11. | "Walked Her Way Down" | 4:17 |
| 12. | "Transit Lounge" | 4:25 |
| 13. | "You Are the One to Make Me Cry" | 3:43 |
| 14. | "People Are Like Suns" | 3:52 |

=== Disc 2 (Unreleased and rare material) ===
All tracks are written by Neil Finn, except where noted.

| No. | Title | Length |
|---|---|---|
| 1. | "She Called Up (Home Demo)" | 3:16 |
| 2. | "A Sigh (Home Demo)" | 2:24 |
| 3. | "Here's A Note (Studio Demo)" | 2:27 |
| 4. | "Purple Light (Home Demo)" | 4:40 |
| 5. | "So Dramatic *" | 3:36 |
| 6. | "Stare Me Out (Alternate Studio Version)" | 3:27 |
| 7. | "Distance Across (Studio Demo)" | 3:15 |
| 8. | "Lost Island (Alternate Mix)" | 3:18 |
| 9. | "Stare Me Out *" | 4:16 |
| 10. | "Bound to Rescue (Home Demo)" | 2:31 |
| 11. | "Don't Stop Now (Home Demo)" | 3:12 |
| 12. | "Won't Be Silent (Home Demo)" (Finn, Nick Seymour) | 3:35 |
| 13. | "People Are Like Suns (Piano Version) *" | 3:51 |

- * Previously released

== Personnel ==
=== Crowded House ===
- Neil Finn: vocals, guitars, Wurlitzer, piano and Vibraphone
- Nick Seymour: bass, backing vocals, autoharp
- Mark Hart: piano, keyboards, electric guitar, harmony vocals on 2, 3, 6 & 12
- Matt Sherrod: drums on 2, 3, 6 & 12, backing vocals on 3

=== Other musicians ===
- Ethan Johns: drums on 1, 7, 9–11 & 13, backing vocals on 1, harmony vocal on 5, string arrangement on 5, 13 & 14, sitar on 7, fuzz guitar on 9, hurdy-gurdy on 9, guitar on 11
- Rikki Gooch: drums on 4, 5 & 11, marching bass drum and cymbal on 13
- Gavin Wright: string leader on 5, 13 & 14
- Isobel Griffiths: string contractor on 5, 13 & 14
- Richard Watkins: French horn on 5
- Eddie Rayner: piano idea on 1, harmonium on 10
- Sharon Finn: harmony vocals on 10
- Don McGlashan: euphonium on 10, harmony vocals on 8
- Joey Waronker: drums on 14
- Jay Joyce: guitar atmosphere on 8
- Beth Rowley: ethereal vocal on 12
- Johnny Marr: electric guitar on 2 & 6, 12-string acoustic guitar on 6, backing vocals on 6
- Elroy Finn: acoustic guitar on 4, 5, 7 & 9, electric guitar on 11
- Liam Finn: harmony vocals on 7, 9 & 10
- Joseph Lindsay: horns on 7
- Isaac McNeill: horns on 7
- Scott Towers: horns on 7

== Charts ==
=== Weekly charts ===
| Chart (2007) | Peak position |
|---|---|
| Australian Albums (ARIA) | 1 |
| Canadian Albums Chart | 38 |
| German Albums Chart | 95 |
| Ireland (IRMA) | 37 |
| Dutch Albums (Album Top 100) | 12 |
| New Zealand Albums (RMNZ) | 2 |
| Norwegian Albums (VG-lista) | 27 |
| Swiss Albums (Schweizer Hitparade) | 89 |
| UK Albums Chart | 3 |
| US Billboard 200 | 46 |

=== Year-end charts ===
| Chart (2007) | Position |
|---|---|
| Australia (ARIA Charts) | 45 |

== Certifications ==
| Region | Certification | Certified units/sales |
|---|---|---|
| Australia (ARIA) | Platinum | 70,000^{^} |
| United Kingdom (BPI) | Silver | 60,000^{^} |
^{^} Shipments figures based on certification alone.

== "Pour Le Monde" ==
"Pour le monde"

Song by Crowded House

from the album Time on Earth
- B-side: "Something So Strong (Live in North America)"; "You Are the One to Make Me Cry (Live in North America)"
- Released: 10 December 2007
- Recorded: 2007
- Genre: Mellow rock
- Length: 5:11
- Label: Parlophone
- Songwriter: Neil Finn
- Producer: Ethan Johns

Crowded House singles chronology
| "She Called Up" (2007) | "Pour le monde" (2007) | "Saturday Sun" (2010) |

"Pour le monde" (French: "For the World") is the third single released from Crowded House's fifth studio album Time on Earth, released on 10 December 2007.

=== Track listing ===
Standard Digital Bundle.

1. "Pour le monde" [Full Length Radio Mix]
2. "Something So Strong" [Live in North America]
3. "You Are the One to Make Me Cry" [Live in North America]

iTunes Exclusive Bundle.

1. "Pour le monde" [Live at the iTunes Festival]
2. "Pour le monde" [Full Length Radio Mix]
3. "Something So Strong" [Live in North America]
4. "You Are the One to Make Me Cry" [Live in North America]
