= I Know (Dionne Farris song) =

1995 single by Dionne Farris

- Artwork for US CD single

Single by Dionne Farris

from the album Wild Seed – Wild Flower
- B-side: "People"; "I Wish I Knew How It Would Feel to Be Free"; "Human"
- Released: January 10, 1995
- Length: 3:47
- Label: Columbia
- Songwriters: Milton Davis; William DuVall
- Producers: Dionne Farris; David Harris; Milton Davis

Dionne Farris singles chronology
"I Know" (1995)	"Don't Ever Touch Me Again" (1997)

Music video
- "I Know" on YouTube

"I Know" is a song by American R&B singer Dionne Farris. Written by Milton Davis and William DuVall, it was released in January 1995 by Columbia Records as the first single from Farris' debut album, Wild Seed – Wild Flower (1994). At the 38th Annual Grammy Awards in 1996, the song was nominated for Best Female Pop Vocal Performance, losing to Annie Lennox's "No More 'I Love You's'". Davis and DuVall won an ASCAP Pop Award for writing the song in 1996.

"I Know" was a hit in Farris's native United States, peaking at number four on the Billboard Hot 100 and spending 10 consecutive weeks at number one on the Billboard Top 40/Mainstream chart, becoming that ranking's most successful song of 1995. Outside the US, "I Know" reached number one in Canada, where it was the 19th-most-successful single of the year. It also reached the top 20 in Australia, Iceland, the Netherlands, and New Zealand and entered the top 40 in several other countries.

== Critical reception ==
Dave Sholin from the Gavin Report wrote, "A sensational talent has emerged from Arrested Development and her name is Dionne Farris. Kent Zimmerman [editor] ran up and down the hall screaming about this weeks ago and even recommended it to his A3 panel. Early airplay indicates Top 40 programmers agree." Pan-European magazine Music & Media commented, "You first heard her voice on Arrested Development's Grammy-winning single 'Tennessee'. Farris solo has kept the band and hip hop concept intact. New is the rockier setting." Charles Aaron from Spin felt the vocalist "relates her story of a too-late lover with carefully measured soul that reads Club VH-1. But the kick comes from a peek-a-boo slide guitar, weaving in and out of the nimble beats and subtle tambourine like a generational flare. It's as if Farris runs down the whole relationship scene for a front porch full of aunts and uncles and grandparents, all of whom nod in rhythm." Mike Joyce from The Washington Post described 'I Know' as "a bluesy, slide guitar-riffed admonition".

== Track listings ==
- US maxi-CD single
1. "I Know" (single edit) – 3:25
2. "People" – 4:45
3. "I Know" (NY reprise mix) – 3:49
4. "I Wish I Knew How It Would Feel to Be Free" – 4:39
5. "I Know" (acoustic roots – extended edit) – 5:03
- US cassette single

A. "I Know" – 3:47
B. "Human" – 3:04

- UK CD1
1. "I Know" (radio version)
2. "I Know" (NY reprise mix)
3. "Human"
4. "The 11th Hour" (edit)
- UK CD2
1. "I Know" (radio version)
2. "I Know" (NY reprise mix)
3. "I Know" (acoustic roots extended mix)
4. "People"
- UK cassette single
1. "I Know" (radio version)
2. "Human"
- European CD single
1. "I Know" (single edit) – 3:23
2. "I Know" (acoustic roots – extended) – 6:01
- Australian CD and cassette single
1. "I Know" (single edit)
2. "I Know" (acoustic roots – extended)
3. "I Know" (NY reprise mix)
- Japanese CD single
1. "I Know" (single version)
2. "Stop the Think"
3. "People"
4. "I Know" (acoustic roots – extended)

== Charts ==
=== Weekly charts ===
Chart (1995–1996)	Peak position
Australia (ARIA)	16
Canada Top Singles (RPM)	1
Europe (European Hit Radio)	19
France (SNEP)	26
Germany (GfK)	59
Iceland (Íslenski Listinn Topp 40)	7
Netherlands (Dutch Top 40 Tipparade)	20
Netherlands (Single Top 100 Tipparade)	10
New Zealand (Recorded Music NZ)	10
Scottish Singles Sales (Official Charts)	32
UK Singles (Official Charts)	41
US Billboard Hot 100	4
US Adult Contemporary (Billboard)	2
US Adult Top 40 (Billboard)	13
US Top 40/Mainstream (Billboard)	1
US Top 40/Rhythm-Crossover (Billboard)	33
US Cash Box Top 100	1

=== Year-end charts ===
Chart (1995)	Position
Brazil (Crowley)	91
Canada Top Singles (RPM)	19
Latvia (Latvijas Top 50)	124
US Billboard Hot 100	11
US Adult Contemporary (Billboard)	2
US Top 40/Mainstream (Billboard)	1
US Cash Box Top 100	4

== Release history ==
Region	Date	Format(s)	Label(s)	Ref.
United States	January 10, 1995	Cassette	Columbia	
Australia	February 13, 1995	CD; cassette	Columbia	
United Kingdom	May 15, 1995	CD	Columbia	
