= Milton Davis =

Milton Davis is an American musician, songwriter and producer from Birmingham, Alabama, who is based in the California Bay Area. He recalls being introduced to gospel music by his grandfather at the age of seven and playing and singing in gospel groups from his childhood to his teenage years. Davis' grandfather was responsible for managing groups such as The Flying Clouds and The Mighty Clouds of Joy.

Davis' early influences include a large range of style and artists: Parliament Funkadelic, The Meters, Earth Wind & Fire, Roxy Music, Led Zeppelin, Peter Gabriel and Prince. His later influences include Jeff Buckley, Tool, Portishead, Jay-Z, The Foo Fighters, Jamiroquai, Red Hot Chili Peppers and Jane’s Addiction.

His accomplishments include work with 3LW, John Mellencamp, Michael Hedges, Tamia, Dawn Robinson, David Ryan Harris, Eric Benet, Paula Abdul, Chyna Phillips, Idina Menzel, Citizen King, Jhene, Damon Johnson and Al Jarreau. Davis was also responsible for the musical scoring of The Parent Trap.

== Discography ==
Year	Artist	Album	Credits
	Shane Evans	Rise	
1992	Vova Nova	Vova Nova	Bass, vocals
1995	Dionne Farris	Wild Seed – Wild Flower	Bass, producer
1996	Citizen King	Count the Days	Producer
1996	John Mellencamp	Mr. Happy Go Lucky	Bass
1997	David Ryan Harris	4 Songs	Bass
1997	David Ryan Harris	David Ryan Harris	Bass
1998	Idina Menzel	Still I Can’t Be Still	Bass, producer
1999	The Other Sister	Movie Soundtrack	Composer, producer
2002	Lori Cullen	So Much	Executive producer
2002	Dawn Robinson	Dawn	Producer
2003	Various Artists	N-Coded Music Presents, Vol. 2: Smooth Urban Vocal	Composer
2003	Lil’ J	Back 2 J	Guitar
2003	Christina Valemi	Aunque Soy Joven	Composer
2003	T.D. Jakes	Follow the Star	Engineer, vocal producer
2003	Various Artists	Fit Mix: Walking	Composer
2004	Sonny Rollins	Proper introduction to Sonny Rollins: Young Rollins	Composer
2004	Various Artists	Essential Jazz Collection (Encoded)	Composer
2004	Various Artists	Rock of the 90s (Sony 3 Pak)	Composer
2004	T.D. Jakes	Follow the Star (DVD)	Vocal producer
2004	Various Artists	Christmas Gumbo	Producer
2004	Neville Brothers	Walkin’ in the Shadow of Life	Bass, audio production, guitar, producer, programming, mixing, composer
2004	John Mellencamp	Words And Music: John Mellencamp’s Greatest Hits	Bass
2004	Greta Gaines	It Was Hot	Producer
2005	Various Artists	Austin City Limits Music Festival: 2004	Composer
2005	Aaron Neville	Christmas Prayer	Bass, composer, drum programming, engineer, orchestral arrangements, mixing, guitar, editing, percussion, vocals (background), vocal arrangement, string arrangements, programming
2005	Various Artists	Hurricane Relief: Come Together Now	Composer
2005	Neville Brothers	Gold	Composer, producer
2007	Various Artists	All #1 Hits 90s	Composer
2007	Various Artists	Wow Gospel Christmas	Vocal producer
2008	Wire: And All the Pieces Matter – Five Years of Music from the Wire	Movie Soundtrack	Producer
2008	Various Artists	Essential 90s (CD/DVD)	Producer, composer
2008	Al Jarreau	Love Songs	Composer
2009	Sara Wasserman	Solid Ground	Audio production
2010	Damon Johnson	Release	Composer
2010	John Mellencamp	On the Rural Route 7609 (Special Edition)	Bass
2010	Ernie Smith	Best of Original Masters	Strings
