= Deckchairs Overboard =

Australian band

- Origin: Sydney, New South Wales, Australia
- Genre: Pop
- Years active: 1982–1985
- Spinoff of: The Cheks
- Past members: Ken Campbell; John Clifforth; Paul Hester; Cathy McQuade; Dennis Flattery; Michael Hoste; Peter Morton; Michael Davis; Peter Adams; Peter Ciobo; Paul Maheno; Scott Saunders; Gordon Sullivan; Matthew Wenban

Deckchairs Overboard were an Australian pop band based in Sydney which formed in 1982 and disbanded in 1985. They released two minor hit singles: "That's The Way" (1983) and "Fight For Love" (1985), as well as a charting LP.

The early line-up, which recorded their 1982 debut EP, consisted of Ken Campbell on vocals, guitar, and drums; John Clifforth on vocals, guitar, and keyboards; Paul Hester (later of Split Enz and Crowded House) on drums; and Cathy McQuade on bass guitar and vocals. Most of the group's initial members had been in the Melbourne group The Cheks (1980–1982) with the exception of McQuade, who had been a member of The Ears. "That's The Way", with Campbell on vocals, was pulled as the single from the EP, and received modest airplay on TV and radio.

Hester had left the group by the end of 1982, and was replaced on drums by Matthew Wenban (billed as Matthew Wambam). "Shout", (1983) with McQuade on lead vocals, was issued as a non-album single by this lineup, but failed to chart. Michael Hoste, an ex-member of Flowers and Icehouse played keyboards with Deckchairs Overboard on live dates in 1983.

Wenban was replaced by yet another drummer, Michael Davis, for the 1984 single "Walking in the Dark" with Clifforth on vocals. This single also failed to chart. There was then a line-up reshuffle by the time of the band's only album, 1985's self-titled Deckchairs Overboard; the group was now officially a duo of Clifforth and McQuade, augmented by session musicians (including former members Wenban and Campbell on a few tracks). "Fight For Love", with Clifforth on vocals, was the album's single: it topped out at 78 on the Australian charts.

McQuade and Clifforth were involved in ABC's TV series Sweet and Sour (1984) supplying the singing voice for two of the lead actors, McQuade also provided bass guitar; Deckchairs Overboard also performed "That's the Way" for the soundtrack. The film I Can't Get Started (1985), starring John Waters had two Deckchairs Overboard tracks, "Mixed Low" and "Legion", on its soundtrack.

Deckchairs Overboard disbanded by the end of 1985.

In 2011, Clifforth released Craven's Pharmacy, featuring work with Hester.

Catherine McQuade released a solo album, Perfect Storm in 2019 and an EP, Life is Elsewhere' in 2021. Catherine released a second solo album Kiss Him Goodbye in 2022. A single from this album Snow was a finalist in the 2022 International John Lennon Songwriting Contest. Catherine wrote the original score for the 1/2 hour crime thriller The Widow which earned 14 International awards for best original score.

== Discography ==
=== Albums ===
| Year | Album details | Peak chart positions |
| Year | Album details | AUS |
|---|---|---|
| 1985 | Deckchairs Overboard: Released: October 1985; Label: Regular Records (L38438); Format: LP | 88 |

=== Extended Play ===
| Year | Album details |
|---|---|
| 1982 | Deckchairs Overboard: Released: 1982; Label: Regular Records (RRT 603); Format: LP |

=== Singles ===
List of singles as lead artist, with selected chart positions and certifications
| Year | Title | Peak chart positions | Album |
| Year | Title | AUS | Album |
|---|---|---|---|
| 1983 | "That's the Way" | 86 | Deckchairs Overboard (EP) |
| 1983 | "Shout" | - | non-album single |
| 1984 | "Walking in the Dark" | - | Deckchairs Overboard |
| 1985 | "Fight for Love" | 78 | Deckchairs Overboard |
| 1985 | "Teach Me to Cry" | - | Deckchairs Overboard |
