= Don't Stop Now =

Single by Crowded House

from the album Time on Earth
- Released: 16 June 2007 (Australia); 25 June 2007 (UK)
- Recorded: 2007
- Genre: Alternative rock
- Length: 3:57
- Label: Capitol
- Songwriter: Neil Finn
- Producer: Steve Lillywhite

Crowded House singles chronology
"Not the Girl You Think You Are" (1996)	"Don't Stop Now" (2007)	"She Called Up" (2007)

Music video
- "Don’t Stop Now" on YouTube

"Don't Stop Now" is the first single from Crowded House's fifth studio album Time on Earth. It was released in Australia on 16 June 2007; in the United Kingdom, it was released digitally on 18 June 2007 and physically on 25 June 2007.

== Background ==
"Don't Stop Now" was written by Neil Finn shortly after he and his wife, Sharon Finn, moved to Freshford near Bath, England. The influence of the song came as a result of Finn's wife driving and having difficulty navigating due to her vehicle's GPS system providing incorrect information. To compound her difficulty, this was her first time driving in this area of England, an area known for its narrow roads.

The song was written by Crowded House frontman Neil Finn as a solo effort. The song features guitar work from alternative group The Smiths' former co-songwriter Johnny Marr. The song was originally destined for Finn's third solo album, but as his third album was converted into the new album for his band Crowded House, the song was released as a Crowded House offering. "Don't Stop Now" is one of only four from the fourteen tracks from Time on Earth that includes the full lineup of Finn, bassist Nick Seymour, guitarist/keyboardist Mark Hart and newcomer drummer Matt Sherrod as Crowded House.

== Cover art ==
The cover art of "Don't Stop Now" is all in the same vein as the album Time on Earth that the song is derived from. This is prominent in that the artwork is made up of newspaper clippings that've been painted to fit the design, in this case appearing to be a green labyrinth with a car and some birds. The difference with this cover is that the song title is hand drawn, where on the album cover, the album title is in newspaper also. The blue dragon from the cover of Time on Earth is also seen hiding within the maze. The music video for "Don't Stop Now" also employs the same artwork and design as the background for the band.

== Notable performances ==
As the lead single for the group's reunion album Time on Earth, Crowded House has performed "Don't Stop Now" at all of their performances since reuniting, including the international event Live Earth on 7 July 2007 and for a promotional performance on the Australian television program Rove on 8 July 2007.

== Music video ==
The music video for "Don't Stop Now" is primarily animated with the band blue screened in. It features the same design and corporate image of the cover of its single and the album Time on Earth. The song is performed by the band who appear to be surrounded by illustrated trees and appear to be in an illustrated and animated world. Later, the band appears at the top of an illustrated newspaper building. The music video features a blue dragon (as from the Time on Earth cover) seeking out and devouring a person, just as from the album cover. The dragon is later featured throughout the music video. In parts of the music video, the shot moves to a close up view of newspaper, as is used on the cover of the album, while a small red car drives along the text and the words being sung are expanded to be read. As it is the first single with drummer Matt Sherrod on drums, it's also the first music video with Crowded House that he has been featured in. Multi-instrumentalist Mark Hart is mostly seen on guitar while the band is in view, however is also shown playing piano in other scenes.

== Reception ==
Junkee said, " A star guest turn from Johnny Marr sees his trademark jangle open up the crack in the darkness to let the light come in, while Finn’s minor-major cadence allows for a rainbow after the storm."

== Track listings ==
All physical formats vary in their track listings. All songs were written by Neil Finn.

=== Australian CD ===
Catalogue number 3977592

1. "Don't Stop Now" – 3:55
2. "Lost Island" – 3:19
3. "Mean to Me" (Live Real World Sessions Webcast) – 3:24
4. "Stare Me Out" – 4:19

=== UK CD ===
Catalogue number CDR6743

1. "Don't Stop Now" – 3:57
2. "Lost Island" – 3:19

=== UK Enhanced CD ===
Catalogue number CDRS6743

1. "Don't Stop Now" – 3:55
2. "Heaven That I'm Making" (Live Real World Sessions Webcast) – 4:17
3. "Don't Stop Now" (Video) – 3:55
4. "Mean to Me" (Live Real World Sessions Webcast) (Video) – 3:19

=== UK 7" vinyl ===
Catalogue number R6743

1. "Don't Stop Now" – 3:57
2. "Stare Me Out"

=== UK promotional CD ===
Catalogue number CHSTOP002

1. "Don't Stop Now" – 3:57

== Personnel ==
- Neil Finn - Guitars and vocals
- Mark Hart - Piano and backing vocals
- Nick Seymour - Bass guitars and backing vocals
- Matt Sherrod - Drums, percussion and backing vocals
- Johnny Marr - Additional guitars

== Charts ==
Chart (2007)	Peak position
Australian ARIA Charts	34
UK Singles Chart	41
US Adult Alternative Airplay (Billboard)	9
