= Intriguer =

Studio album by Crowded House
- Released: 11 June 2010
- Recorded: April 2009 – January 2010
- Studio: Roundhead Studios, Auckland; RAK Studios, London; Real World Studios, Wiltshire
- Genre: Alternative rock
- Length: 40:19
- Label: Fantasy, UMGI
- Producer: Jim Scott

Crowded House chronology
| Time on Earth (2007) | Intriguer (2010) | The Very Very Best of Crowded House (2010) |

Intriguer is the sixth studio album by rock group Crowded House, released on 11 June 2010. It is the band's follow-up to the group's 2007 reunion album Time on Earth. The first single for the album, "Saturday Sun", was released to radio and the video clip released to the internet in April 2010.

== Album history ==
Following the release of Crowded House's reunion album Time on Earth in 2007, Neil Finn announced that the band would re-enter the studio to record a follow-up album which would feature the current lineup, consisting of Finn on vocals, guitars and piano, fellow founding member Nick Seymour on bass guitar, Mark Hart on guitars and keyboards, and then-newcomer Matt Sherrod on drums. The band performed a small concert in The Leigh Sawmill, north of Auckland, in February 2008 and featured a few songs which were later to be recorded by the band for the next album.

In 2009, the band re-entered the studio and recorded demo tracks of 11 songs, some of which Finn had written during the tour around the previous album. For these recordings, the group enlisted producer Jim Scott for the first time, who then continued to produce the whole album in Finn's studio, Roundhead Studios in Auckland, New Zealand.

The band hired various guest musicians throughout the recording process, including multi-instrumentalist Don McGlashan, Lisa Germano on violin, Jon Brion on vocals and guitars, James Milne on additional vocals, and Finn's wife Sharon and son, Liam Finn contribute backing vocals and guitars, respectively.

== Critical reception ==
Professional ratings
Review scores
| Source | Rating |
|---|---|
| Allmusic | 4/5 stars |
| BBC | positive |
| Billboard.com | positive |
| Entertainment Weekly | B+ |
| Los Angeles Times | 3/4 stars |
| Mojo | 4/5 stars |
| musicOMH | 4/5 stars |
| Popdose | positive |
| Q | 3/5 stars |
| Rave magazine | 4/5 stars |
| Sputnikmusic | 4/5 stars |
| The Times | 5/5 stars |
| Uncut | 3/5 stars |
| Zeitgeisty Report | 8.5/10 stars |

The album was very well received by professional critics and the public. On Metacritic it has 75 out of 100, based on reviews from 13 critics, indicating "generally favourable reviews". Most enthusiastic was The Times which pointed that "it goes shoulder to shoulder with their best materials" and gave it 5 stars. Also very positive was Billboard which found that "Finn's durable songcraft never fails to enthrall." BBC was also very positive with statement "Crowded House have always sounded in parts like the later solo career Paul McCartney should have had. Despite the anthems being on a tight leash, repeated listens reveal this to be one of their best albums." Entertainment Weekly gave it B+ saying that "the House head honcho proved he was still a classy, clever tunesmith, and does so again here on Intriguer." Mojo, Allmusic Guide, and musicOMH gave it 4 stars with many praises such as "Intriguer will have to stand or fall on its own merits. If there is any justice in the world it will be a bestseller."

Allmusic Guide put Intriguer in its annual list of best rock albums in 2010. Intriguer was on many lists of best albums in 2010 of various music magazines and sites including Popdose, "Popblerd", "Qromag", "Blurt-online", and others. In "Popmatters" which gave 7 out of 10 stars at first, Intriguer finished on "slipped discs" of 2010, great albums which didn't make top 70 of the year.

Among mixed critics was Q Magazine, which gave 3 stars and stated that "who could've predicted, then, that Intriguer would be his best work in nearly two decades?" Uncut also gave 3 stars, saying that the album "suffers slightly from Crowded House's signature weakness: a tendency to retreat into tastefulness." Ally Carnwath from The Guardian also gave it 3 stars, saying "the trouble with the album's more conventionally crafted pop songs is that they invariably sound dull."

== Track listings ==
All tracks are written by Neil Finn, except where noted.

| No. | Title | Length |
|---|---|---|
| 1. | "Saturday Sun" | 3:27 |
| 2. | "Archer's Arrows" | 4:05 |
| 3. | "Amsterdam" | 3:34 |
| 4. | "Either Side of the World" | 4:35 |
| 5. | "Falling Dove" | 4:35 |
| 6. | "Isolation" (Finn, Mark Hart, Nick Seymour, Matt Sherrod) | 4:38 |
| 7. | "Twice if You're Lucky" | 3:34 |
| 8. | "Inside Out" | 3:19 |
| 9. | "Even If" | 4:03 |
| 10. | "Elephants" | 4:27 |

- "Eyes Grow Heavy" was released as a downloadable bonus track from Getmusic. "Turn it Around" was released as a downloadable bonus track from iTunes.

== Bonus DVD (deluxe edition) ==
1. "Either Side of the World" (Upstairs at Home)
2. "Amsterdam" (Upstairs at Home)
3. "Saturday Sun" (Upstairs at Home)
4. "Twice If You're Lucky" (Upstairs at Home)
5. "Elephants" (Upstairs at Home)
6. "Falling Dove" (Upstairs at Home)
7. "Isolation" (Upstairs at Home)
8. "Archer's Arrows" (Upstairs at Home)
9. "Either Side of the World" (Live at the Auckland Town Hall)
10. "Isolation" (Live at the Auckland Town Hall)
11. "Saturday Sun" (Official Video)

– USA/Canada issue substitutes "Don't Dream It's Over" for "Isolation"

== 2016 Deluxe Edition ==
=== Disc 1 (Original album) ===
All tracks are written by Neil Finn, except where noted.

| No. | Title | Length |
|---|---|---|
| 1. | "Saturday Sun" | 4:10 |
| 2. | "Archer's Arrows" | 3:54 |
| 3. | "Amsterdam" | 2:53 |
| 4. | "Either Side of the World" | 5:21 |
| 5. | "Falling Dove" | 5:10 |
| 6. | "Isolation" (Finn, Mark Hart, Nick Seymour, Matt Sherrod) | 3:57 |
| 7. | "Twice if You're Lucky" | 3:56 |
| 8. | "Inside Out" | 3:17 |
| 9. | "Even If" | 5:52 |
| 10. | "Elephants" | 3:43 |

=== Disc 2 (Unreleased and rare material) ===
All tracks are written by Neil Finn, except where noted.

| No. | Title | Length |
|---|---|---|
| 1. | "Only Way to Go Is Forwards (Live)" | 5:13 |
| 2. | "Beautiful Life (Live)" | 5:14 |
| 3. | "Either Side of The World (Live)" | 4:52 |
| 4. | "Twice If You're Lucky (Live)" | 4:52 |
| 5. | "Bound To Rescue (Live)" | 2:47 |
| 6. | "God Lives Over The Road (Studio Demo)" | 3:41 |
| 7. | "Isolation (Studio Demo; Alternate Version)" | 3:30 |
| 8. | "Better Things (Studio Demo)" | 3:22 |
| 9. | "Even If (Take 1)" | 4:23 |
| 10. | "Archer's Arrows (Alternate Version)" | 2:57 |
| 11. | "Saturday Sun (Alternate Version)" | 3:30 |
| 12. | "The Intriguer" | 3:26 |
| 13. | "Turn It Around *" | 4:04 |
| 14. | "Eyes Grow Heavy*" | 3:42 |
| 15. | "Two Minutes of Silence" (Finn, Mark Hart, Nick Seymour, Matt Sherrod) | 4:12 |
| 16. | "Nonsense of Course" (Finn, Hart, Seymour, Sherrod) | 9:05 |

- *Previously released.

== Personnel ==
=== Crowded House ===
- Neil Finn: vocals, guitars, piano
- Nick Seymour: bass
- Mark Hart: piano, keyboards, electric guitar
- Matt Sherrod: drums

=== Additional musicians ===
- Don McGlashan: mandolin, tambourine, acoustic and electric guitar and euphonium
- Sharon Finn: vocals
- Liam Finn: electric guitar on Isolation
- Lisa Germano: violin on Archer's Arrows and Even If
- Jon Brion: guitar and vocals on Twice If You're Lucky
- Jim Scott: low piano, tambourine, shaker, sleighbell
- Michael McClintock: violin on Even If
- Greg Leisz: pedal steel on Elephants

== Charts ==
| Chart (2010) | Peak position |
|---|---|
| Australian Albums (ARIA) | 1 |
| Belgium | 10 |
| Ireland (IRMA) | 17 |
| Dutch Albums (Album Top 100) | 31 |
| New Zealand Albums (RMNZ) | 3 |
| Norwegian Albums (VG-lista) | 32 |
| Spanish Albums (Promusicae) | 98 |
| UK Albums Chart | 12 |
| US Billboard 200 | 50 |

== Certifications ==
Certifications for Intriguer
| Region | Certification | Certified units/sales |
|---|---|---|
| Australia (ARIA) | Gold | 35,000^{‡} |
^{‡} Sales+streaming figures based on certification alone.
