= Not the Girl You Think You Are =

Single by Crowded House

from the album Recurring Dream
- Released: August 1996
- Recorded: 1996
- Genre: Rock
- Length: 4:08
- Label: Capitol
- Songwriter: Neil Finn
- Producers: Mitchell Froom, Neil Finn, Tchad Blake

Crowded House singles chronology
"Instinct" (1996)	"Not the Girl You Think You Are" (1996)	"Don't Stop Now" (2007)

"Not the Girl You Think You Are" is a 1996 song by rock group Crowded House. It was the third and final single released from the group's greatest hits compilation Recurring Dream (1996). According to the songwriter Neil Finn, the song was written as both his homage to The Beatles and his attempt at writing a song like them. It reached No. 37 on the ARIA Singles Chart, No. 41 in New Zealand, and No. 20 on the UK Singles Chart., where it entered the charts in mid-August.

Finn mentioned on Twitter in 2016 that the song was recorded using an Optigan.

== Music video ==
A music video was provided for "Not the Girl You Think You Are", filmed within a hotel featuring the band amongst many mysterious persons. It was directed by Jeff Darling, with production design by Ross Wallace. At the ARIA Music Awards of 1997 it was nominated for "Best Video".

== Reception ==
Junkee said, "Here, Finn pens his own Beatles homage. It’s another low-key, humble and wholly charming Crowdies moment. There’s also sentimental value attached: These sessions marked Hester’s final time recording with the band."

== Track listing ==
Live tracks recorded on the Phill Jupitus show, BBC GLR, 21 June 1996, the last live performance of the 1990s by Crowded House in the UK before disbanding.

=== Disc one ===
1. "Not the Girl You Think You Are" - 4:11
2. "Instinct" (live)
3. "Distant Sun" (live)
4. "Fall at Your Feet" (live)

=== Disc two ===
1. "Not the Girl You Think You Are" - 4:11
2. "Private Universe" (live) - 5:34
3. "Fingers of Love" (live) - 5:19
4. "Better Be Home Soon" (live) - 3:27

== Charts ==
Chart (1996)	Peak position
UK Singles (OCC)	20
