= Tarmac Adam =

Australian pop band

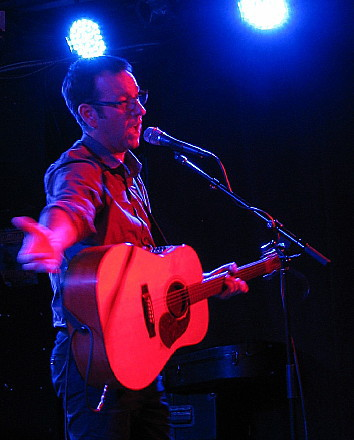
- Matt O'Donnell performing with Tarmac Adam in 2013

Background information
- Origin: Melbourne, Australia
- Genres: Pop
- Years active: 2002—present
- Label: Onesize Records
- Spinoff of: Crowded House
- Members: Matt O'Donnell; Steve Paix; Josh Barber; Ruben Alexander; Nick Seymour
- Past members: Sean McVitty; Paul Hester
- Website: tarmacadam.com.au

Tarmac Adam are a Melbourne-based Australian pop band formed in 2001 by singer–songwriter Matt O'Donnell. It includes Nick Seymour on bass, Ruben Alexander on drums, Josh Barber on percussion, and Steve Paix on keyboards and saxophone.

== History ==
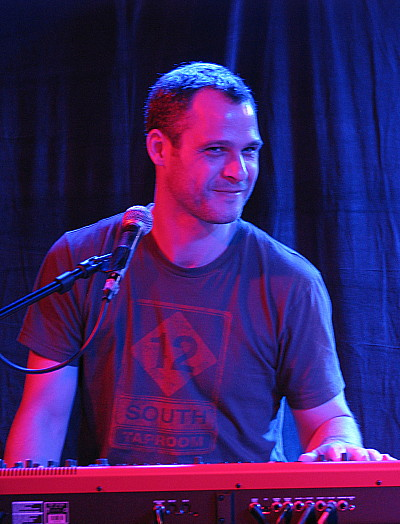
Steve Paix on keyboards

According to Matt O'Donnell, Tarmac Adam developed from a solo recording project he had begun planning around the year 2000. "I always had one foot in music", he said. "During my years as an occupational therapist, I'd take time off each year and go overseas, primarily to Germany, as a solo acoustic act, sometimes with a band. I've played in bands for fifteen, sixteen years, on and off".

O'Donnell began working on demos with guitarist Sean McVitty. They invited Crowded House members Nick Seymour and Paul Hester to join on bass and drums, respectively. The project was complemented by keyboardist and saxophonist Steve Paix.

In 2003, Tarmac Adam released the album Handheld Torch, recorded in Melbourne and Dublin and produced by Nick Seymour. The album was self-funded by O'Donnell after approaches to record companies for a recording deal were rebuffed. Hester died in March 2005 and, in 2007, Seymour returned to Crowded House after the band reunited.

In June 2007, Tarmac Adam announced it was "back jogging on the main arterial as they prepare for the next stage of the journey. It's been a while but the break has been fruitful". The band's website said Handheld Torch would be repackaged, adding unreleased tracks from the early sessions with Seymour and Hester, as well as ambient instrumental remixes. In February 2008, the website featured a new song, "You As Me", and noted that "Tarmac Adam music is being made".

The band, at this point composed of O'Donnell, Seymour, and Paix, as well as Ruben Alexander on drums and Josh Barber on percussion, released their sophomore album, The History Effect, in 2013. Following this release, O'Donnell, Paix, and Barber toured the US as a three-piece, to promote the new material, with an itinerary that included a national TV appearance, various radio interviews, and live performances.

Tarmac Adam's third album, In Place, was released in October 2015, and once again featured Nick Seymour on bass.

== Band members ==
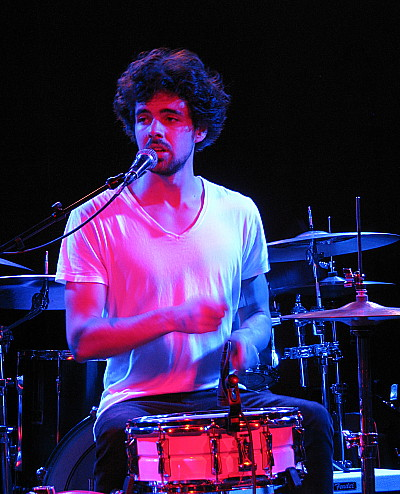
Ruben Alexander on drums

Current

- Matt O'Donnell – vocals
- Steve Paix – keyboards
- Josh Barber – percussion
- Ruben Alexander – drums
- Nick Seymour – bass

Past

- Sean McVitty – guitar
- Paul Hester – drums

== Discography ==
- Handheld Torch (2003)
- The History Effect (2013)
- In Place (2015)
