= Follow for Now (album) =

Studio album by Follow for Now
- Released: September 10, 1991
- Genre: Funk rock
- Length: 51:50
- Label: Chrysalis
- Producer: Matt Sherrod

Professional ratings
Review scores
Source	Rating
AllMusic	4/5 stars
Rolling Stone	4/5 stars

Follow for Now is the debut and only studio album by the American rock band Follow for Now, released in 1991.

The album includes a cover of "She Watch Channel Zero?!" by Public Enemy.

Follow for Now split before they could record a follow-up to this debut album.

Reports indicate that producer Matt Sherrod played drums on most of the album and deleted the unconventional drumming of band member Enrique.

== Reception ==
AllMusic noted that the band may have deserved constant comparisons to Living Colour that it had received from the press, but also noted the influence of Public Enemy and Bad Brains. Critic Rick Anderson concluded that Follow for Now "is a tight, hard, very funky band that stands easily on its own despite obvious influences," and called the album "an auspicious debut." Rolling Stone noted that Follow for Now exhibited "a wide-ranging mastery of rock styles" and found additional influences from Cream, Love, and Anthrax. Another reviewer praised the charismatic vocals of David Ryan Harris and Hendrix-like persona of guitarist Chris Tinsley. The album was also noted for its mix of "R&B, funk, hip hop, a little psychedelia, and a hint of metal."

== Track listing ==
1. "Holy Moses"
2. "Temptation"
3. "Mistreatin' Folks"
4. "She Watch Channel Zero?!"
5. "Time"
6. "Fire 'N Snakes"
7. "Evil Wheel"
8. "Ms. Fortune"
9. "White Hood"
10. "Trust"
11. "6's and 7's"
12. "Milkbone"

== Personnel ==
- David Ryan Harris – guitar, vocals
- Chris Tinsley – guitar, vocals
- Billy Fields – keyboards, vocals
- Jamie Turner – bass
- Enrique – drums
