= The Cheks =

Australian power pop band

The Cheks were a power pop band active in 1980–1982 and based in Melbourne, Victoria, Australia. They are notable for having Paul Hester on drums. The Cheks were formed with John Clifforth (guitar), Ken Campbell (guitar) and Steve White (bass guitar). The lineup changed quickly with the departure of Steve White and the addition of Steve Carter. In 1982, Clifforth, Campbell and Hester moved to Sydney to form Deckchairs Overboard with Cathy McQuade (bass). Hester was later drummer for Split Enz and then Crowded House. Other Cheks members went on to form Don't Panic and Ambivilent Hoojahs. Cheks were moderately popular within the Melbourne and Sydney alternative music scenes.
