= Gravity Stairs =

Studio album by Crowded House
- Released: 31 May 2024
- Length: 40:40
- Labels: Lester; BMG Rights Management
- Producers: Crowded House; Steven Schram

Crowded House chronology
Dreamers Are Waiting (2021)	Gravity Stairs (2024)

Singles from Gravity Stairs
- 1. "Oh Hi" Released: 8 February 2024; 2. "Teenage Summer" Released: 12 April 2024; 3. "The Howl" Released: 31 May 2024; 4. "Some Greater Plan (For Claire)" Released: 1 October 2024

Gravity Stairs is the eighth studio album by Australian rock band Crowded House, released on 31 May 2024 through Lester Records and BMG Rights Management. It was preceded by the release of the lead single "Oh Hi" on 8 February 2024. The album received favourable reviews from critics.

At the 2024 ARIA Music Awards, the album was nominated for ARIA Award for Best Adult Contemporary Album and Crowded House & Steven Schram were nominated for Best Produced Release.

At the AIR Awards of 2025, Steven Schram received a nomination in the field of Independent Mix, Studio or Mastering Engineer of the Year for work on this album.

== Background ==
The band produced the album with Steven Schram, with frontman Neil Finn stating that the band wanted to maintain a "dreamy quality" on the record yet be more "lyrically direct". Lead single "Oh Hi" was inspired by Finn's work for the nonprofit organisation So They Can, which builds schools in remote areas of Kenya and Tanzania. Finn named the album after a stone staircase near a place he vacations, which he compared to his mentality as a musician, calling the title a "metaphor for getting a little older and becoming aware of your own mortality, your own physicality" as there is "more determination needed to get to the top, but there's still the same compulsion to climb". The cover art is a pastiche of the Beatles' 1966 album Revolver drawn by Nick Seymour.

== Critical reception ==
Professional ratings
Aggregate scores
Source	Rating
Metacritic	73/100
Review scores
Source	Rating
Classic Rock	3.5/5 stars
Mojo	4/5 stars
MusicOMH	3.5/5 stars
Uncut	6/10

Gravity Stairs received a score of 73 out of 100 on review aggregator Metacritic based on five reviews, which the website categorised as "generally favorable" reception. Mojo's Andy Fyfe called the album "the most Crowded House thing that Crowded House have made in 30 years" as "'Teenage Summer', 'Oh Hi' and particularly 'All That I Can Ever Own' and 'The Howl' effortlessly withstand direct comparison with the band's mid-'90s peak". John Murphy of MusicOMH summarised it as "a welcome reminder that the Finn family are still going strong, with upbeat, breezy numbers set against languid, deliberately paced tracks".

Damian Jones of Classic Rock wrote that "gone (for the most part) are the familiar pop hooks that dominated [the band's] early records, exchanged for more thoughtful, complicated arrangements as frontman Neil Finn contemplates his own mortality". Uncut felt that "Crowded House's eighth studio release ticks all the expected boxes. Pitch-perfect harmonies and inventive chord sequences abound. [...] Where it falls short, perhaps, is the absence of the full-blooded radio-friendly hits of old, although the shuffling 'All That I Can Ever Own' is a close cousin to 1993's 'Distant Sun'".

== Track listing ==
Gravity Stairs track listing
No.	Title	Writer(s)	Length
1.	"Magic Piano"	Neil Finn	4:46
2.	"Teenage Summer"	N. Finn	3:47
3.	"The Howl"	Liam Finn	3:26
4.	"All That I Can Ever Own"	N. Finn	3:04
5.	"Oh Hi"	N. Finn	2:59
6.	"Some Greater Plan (for Claire)"	N. Finn; Tim Finn	4:10
7.	"Black Water, White Circle"	N. Finn	3:42
8.	"Blurry Grass"	Elroy Finn; N. Finn	3:09
9.	"I Can't Keep Up with You"	L. Finn; N. Finn	4:01
10.	"Thirsty"	E. Finn; N. Finn	3:30
11.	"Night Song"	N. Finn	4:12
Total length:			40:40

Notes

- On physical editions, "Teenage Summer" is titled "Life's Imitation".

== Personnel ==
Crowded House

- Neil Finn – lead vocals, guitar, keyboards, piano, production, bass
- Liam Finn – guitar, vocals, production
- Elroy Finn – drums, guitar, keyboards, vocals, production
- Nick Seymour – bass, keyboards, vocals, production, cover artwork
- Mitchell Froom – keyboards, production

Additional contributors

- Steven Schram – production, mixing, electric guitar on "The Howl" and "I Can't Keep Up with You"
- Bob Ludwig – engineering
- Paul Taylor – percussion
- Sharon Finn – additional vocals on "Magic Piano" and "All That I Can Ever Own"
- Ladyhawke – additional vocals on "Teenage Summer"
- Tim Finn – additional vocals on "Some Greater Plan (for Claire)"
- Antonis Moriatis – bouzouki on "Some Greater Plan (for Claire)"
- Elias Dendias – bouzouki on "Some Greater Plan (for Claire)"
- Nassos Vlachos – guitar on "Some Greater Plan (for Claire)"
- Tryfon Baitsis – guitar on "Some Greater Plan (for Claire)"
- Lauryn Canny – additional backing vocals on "Black Water, White Circle", additional vocals on "Blurry Grass" and "Thirsty"
- Eliza-Jane Barnes – additional vocals on "Thirsty"
- Jimmy Metherell – additional vocals on "Thirsty"
- Zoe Moon – additional vocals on "Night Song"

== Charts ==
=== Weekly charts ===
Weekly chart performance for Gravity Stairs
Chart (2024)	Peak position
Australian Albums (ARIA)	3
Belgian Albums (Ultratop Flanders)	78
New Zealand Albums (RMNZ)	4
Scottish Albums (Official Charts)	6
UK Albums (Official Charts)	8
UK Independent Albums (Official Charts)	3

=== Year-end charts ===
2024 year-end chart performance for Gravity Stairs
Chart (2024)	Position
Australian Artist Albums (ARIA)	45
