= Wild Seed – Wild Flower =

Studio album by Dionne Farris
- Released: October 25, 1994
- Recorded: 1993–1994
- Studio: Sony Music (New York City, New York); Sony Music (Los Angeles, California); Westlake (Los Angeles, California); McMix Production Services (Atlanta, Georgia); Larrabee (North Hollywood, California)
- Genre: Alternative hip hop; funk; pop rock; folk rock
- Length: 62:47
- Label: Columbia
- Producer: Dionne Farris; David Ryan Harris; Milton Davis; Randy Jackson; David Frank

Dionne Farris chronology
Wild Seed – Wild Flower (1994)	For Truth If Not Love (2007)

Wild Seed – Wild Flower is the debut full-length album by American singer Dionne Farris. Having found success for her performance on the song "Tennessee" by the alternative hip hop group Arrested Development, Farris, rather than continue with Arrested Development, made a solo record with members of the band Follow for Now, David Ryan Harris and Billy Fields. The album title was inspired in part by the Octavia E. Butler novel. The lead single, "I Know", peaked at number 4 on the Billboard Hot 100 in 1995.

== Reception ==
Professional ratings
Review scores
Source	Rating
AllMusic	4.5/5 stars
Chicago Tribune	3/4 stars
Robert Christgau	(dud)
The Encyclopedia of Popular Music	4/5 stars
The Guardian	3/4 stars
Los Angeles Times	3.5/4 stars
Rolling Stone	4/5 stars

"I Know" was the only hit from the album, but Tom Demalon of AllMusic wrote that the album's "charms run much deeper" than the "percolating and infectious" hit single. However, critic Brent Mann expressed the opposite view, stating that the other songs "lacked energy and direction" and in one case turned "plodding and ponderous."

== Track listing ==
Wild Seed – Wild Flower track listing
No.	Title	Writer(s)	Producer(s)	Length
1.	"I Know"	Milton Davis; William DuVall	Davis; Dionne Farris; David Harris; Randy Jackson	3:49
2.	"Reality"	Farris; Billy Fields; Skitch Lovett	Davis; Farris; Harris; Jackson	4:42
3.	"Stop to Think"	Farris; Lenny Kravitz	Jackson	5:29
4.	"Passion"	Farris; Fields; Lovett	Jackson	5:44
5.	"Food for Thought"	Farris; Harris	Davis; Farris; Harris; Jackson	6:35
6.	"Now or Later"	Farris; Fields; Lovett	Jackson	5:19
7.	"Don't Ever Touch Me (Again)"	Farris; Harris	Davis; Farris; Harris; Jackson	4:27
8.	"11th Hour"	Farris; David Frank	Frank	4:46
9.	"Water"	Farris; Fields	Farris; Jackson	4:06
10.	"Blackbird"	John Lennon; Paul McCartney	Davis; Farris; Harris	3:08
11.	"Old Ladies" (discussion of "Blackbird")		Farris	0:27
12.	"Human"	Farris	Farris	3:04
13.	"Find Your Way"	Farris; Tim Heintz; Jackson	Farris; Jackson	5:44
14.	"The Audition" (skit)		Farris	1:38
15.	"I Know" (NY Reprise Mix)	Davis; DuVall	Davis; Farris; Harris; Jackson	3:49

== Personnel ==
Adapted from the liner notes of Wild Seed – Wild Flower.

- Dionne Farris – vocals (1–10, 12, 13, 15), all vocal arrangements, string arrangements (5)
- Tim Heintz – keyboards (1, 6, 13), acoustic piano (6, 9), synthesizers (9, 13), Rhodes electric piano (13)
- David Kahne – keyboards (1)
- Ezra Greer – programming (3)
- Carl Young – keyboards (4), saxophone (9)
- Steven Twyman – organ (5)
- David Frank – keyboards (8), synthesizers (8)
- Billy Fields – keyboards (9)
- David Ryan Harris – guitars (1, 2, 5, 7, 10, 15), drum programming (1, 5), backing vocals (1, 7, 10, 15), keyboards (5), drums (5), arrangements (10)
- Skitch Lovett – guitars (2, 6)
- Torrell Ruffin – guitars (3, 4, 9, 13)
- Bruce Gaitsch – guitars (6)
- Paul Barrere – additional slide guitar (15)
- Milton Davis – bass (1, 2, 7, 15)
- Randy Jackson – bass (1, 3, 13)
- Lonnie Marshall – bass (4, 6, 9)
- Parish Wintersmith – drums (1, 13)
- John Mitchell – drum programming (1, 2, 13)
- Ju Ju House – drums (3, 6, 7, 9, 15)
- Anthony Johnson – drums (4)
- Pete Escovedo – percussion (2, 5)
- Jeff Haynes – percussion (3, 6, 7, 9, 10, 13, 15)
- DJ Nabs – scratches (2), turntables (3)
- Dennis Poole – sample clearances (3)
- Madeline Smith – sample clearances (3)
- Suzie Katayama – cello (5, 7)
- Joel Derouin – violin (5, 7)
- Russell Mullen – trumpet (9)
- William Galison – harmonica (13)
- Terrance Shelton – backing vocals (3)
- Leesa Richards – backing vocals (7)
- David Alan Grier – voices (11, 14)
- Melody – voices (11, 14)
- Moe – voices (11, 14), all instruments (12)

=== Production ===
- Michael Simanga – executive producer, management for Posact, Inc.
- Dionne Farris – executive producer, producer, liner notes
- Randy Jackson – executive producer, producer (1–7, 9, 13, 15)
- Milton Davis – producer (1, 2, 5, 7, 10, 15)
- David Ryan Harris – producer (1, 2, 5, 7, 10, 15)
- David Frank – producer (8)
- Allen Abrahamson – engineer, mixing (2–7, 9, 11–15)
- Danny Kopelson – engineer, mixing (10)
- Don McKinzie – engineer
- Jess Sutcliffe – engineer, mixing (8)
- Michael H. Brauer – mixing (1)
- Thom Cadley – assistant engineer
- Bruck Dawit – assistant engineer
- Mark Endert – assistant engineer
- Mike Fisher – assistant engineer
- Chris Herles – assistant engineer
- Greg Mull – assistant engineer
- Sheila Starks – assistant engineer
- James Williamson – assistant engineer
- Stephen Marcussen – mastering at Precision Mastering (Hollywood, California)
- Mary Maurer – art direction
- Doug Erb – design
- Cheri Gray – front cover design
- Sandra Hendricks – front cover photography
- David Roth – back cover photography
- Melvone Farrell – make-up

== Charts ==
Wild Seed – Wild Flower chart performance
Chart (1995)	Peak position
Australian Albums (ARIA)	42
German Albums (Offizielle Top 100)	85
US Billboard 200	57
