= Follow for Now =

American rock band (1987–1994)

- 1991 promotional photograph

Background information
- Origin: Atlanta, Georgia, U.S.
- Genres: Funk rock; funk metal; black rock
- Years active: 1987–1994
- Label: Chrysalis
- Past members: David Ryan Harris; Chris Tinsley; Bernard "Enrique" Coley; Billy Fields; Jamie Turner; Justin Senker

Follow for Now was an American rock band from Atlanta, Georgia, formed in 1987. During the height of their popularity, Follow for Now were considered an important band in an emerging black rock movement that also included Bad Brains, Living Colour and Fishbone. They released one self-titled album in 1991.

== History ==
Follow for Now were formed in 1987 by guitarist/vocalist David Ryan Harris, guitarist Chris Tinsley, bassist Justin Senker, and drummer Enrique (real name Bernard Coley). The band got their name from a lyric in the Public Enemy song "Bring the Noise". They quickly developed a reputation for incendiary live shows with frequent call-and-response chants with the audience, and were known for an eclectic mix of hard rock, funk, soul, jazz, ska, and heavy metal.

Senker departed in 1989, and was replaced by new bassist Jamie Turner. The band also expanded to a quintet with the addition of keyboardist/vocalist Billy Fields. In 1990, Follow for Now headlined a show at the Center Stage Theater in Atlanta without a record contract, even though the two opening bands did have contracts. They were then signed by Chrysalis Records and released their self-titled debut album in 1991. The album received a positive review from Rolling Stone, though fans were disappointed when producer Matt Sherrod played drums on most of the album and deleted the unconventional drumming of band member Enrique. Despite a significant promotional effort by Chrysalis, the album sold poorly but gained notice for a cover of Public Enemy's "She Watch Channel Zero?!".

Despite their popularity as a live act, Follow for Now were unable to produce a follow-up album and broke up in 1994. David Ryan Harris became musical director for soul singer Dionne Farris and contributed to her successful 1995 album Wild Seed – Wild Flower. Harris signed with Sony Records as a solo artist in 1997 and has released some records under his own name while collaborating with many other artists in a variety of genres. Harris is also the father of rapper Baby Tate. Billy Fields later joined Arrested Development.

== Personnel ==
- David Ryan Harris – vocals, guitar (1987–1994)
- Chris Tinsley – guitar, vocals (1987–1994)
- Bernard "Enrique" Coley – drums (1987–1994)
- Justin Senker – bass (1987–1989)
- Jamie Turner – bass (1989–1994)
- Billy Fields – keyboards, piano, vocals (1989–1994)

== Discography ==
- Follow for Now (1991)
