= Pilgrims (band) =

Spanish rock band

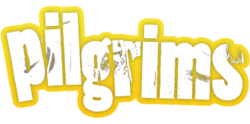

Background information
- Also known as: The Pilgrims
- Origin: Valladolid, Castile and León, Valladolid
- Genres: Funk rock
- Years active: 2009—
- Labels: Independent
- Members: Nikolas East, Daniel Birch, Miguel Ángel Cubillo, Daniel Clérigo
- Website: pilgrimsband.wordpress.com

Pilgrims is a musical group from Valladolid, Spain. It is often included as one of the pillars in the independent scene of Valladolid music. Their music has been described as "funk rock".

The band has four members: Nikolas East (guitarist and lead singer) and Daniel Birch (saxophonist) from the UK, and Miguel Ángel Cubillo (bassist) and Daniel Clérigo (drummer) from Spain.

Their first recorded project was the EP Half Breed Sunrise, submitted in November 2010.
