= Dionne Farris =

American singer (born 1969)

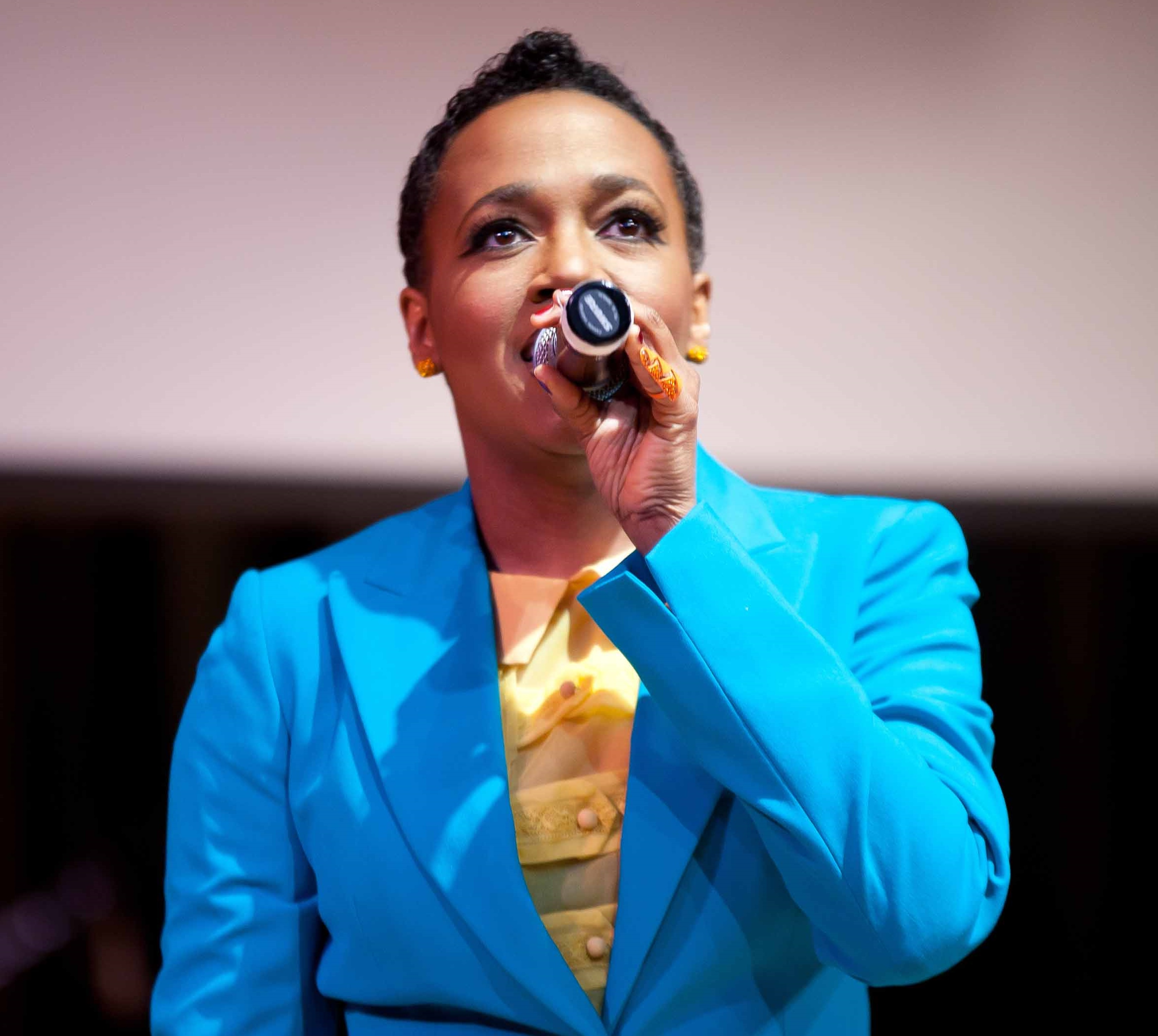
- Farris at the 2013 Black Women Rock concert

Background information
- Also known as: The Original Soul Rocker, Lady DY
- Born: December 4, 1969 (age 56); Plainfield, New Jersey, U.S.
- Genres: R&B; pop; soul; alternative hip-hop; pop rock; jazz
- Years active: 1992–present
- Labels: Columbia; Free and Clear
- Website: dionnefarris.com

Dionne Farris (born December 4, 1969) is an American singer and songwriter. Born and raised in New Jersey, she began singing in elementary school and competed in pageants as a teenager. In the early 1990s, she was featured on the hip-hop group Arrested Development's hit single "Tennessee" (1992).

Farris found success with the release of her debut album, Wild Seed – Wild Flower (1994) on Columbia Records. The album featured the US top ten single, "I Know" (1995). The music video earned Farris the Billboard Music Video Awards Best Pop/Rock New Artist Clip of the Year. She was also nominated for the Grammy Award for Best Female Pop Vocal Performance in 1996.

== Early life ==
Farris was born in Plainfield, New Jersey, the daughter of Larraine (Wall) and Richard Farris, both of whom had musical talents and aspirations, and named Dionne for their favorite singer Dionne Warwick. Farris was raised in Bordentown, New Jersey by her single mother, whose side of the family introduced her to the musical acts that shaped and influenced her. Farris was a huge fan of Diana Ross as a child – one of Farris’ fonder memories was attending a Ross concert in New York City at the age of eight, being lifted by her uncle onstage, and getting kissed by Ross.

Farris began taking dance lessons at the age of three at Irene Parker Dance Studio in Hamilton Township, New Jersey. She danced ballet, jazz, tap, and toe for 10 years, opting at 13 to sing instead. She sang in her high school's choir.

After graduating from Bordentown Regional High in 1987, Farris attended Mercer County Community College, where she studied photography. Farris entered into the Miss Hemisphere Pageant regional competitions, directly after high school and won her first and only pageant as 1987's Miss Hemisphere's Adult Talent, singing Whitney Houston's "Saving All My Love for You" in Miami, Florida. She joined a band known as 2.0 and later as Breaking Ground. They began performing on the Manhattan's club circuit, and looked to sign a record deal. Farris decided to move to Atlanta with her then boyfriend Donald "Rasa Don" Jones (one of the early members of Arrested Development), where her father lived. After a short time, Farris met with Atlanta producer Jermaine Dupri and began writing songs for Atlanta-based acts such as TLC and singing backgrounds for acts such as Xscape, and El Debarge. She signed a management contract with Michael Mauldin's (father of Dupri) company as a solo artist, but later became a member of a girl group they were producing, known as Onyx.

== Career ==
=== Arrested Development ===
Farris and the musical group Arrested Development were signed to the same management company. The group wanted a female singer for their 3 Years, 5 Months & 2 Days in the Life Of... album and Farris agreed to sing with the group although she was not an official member. Farris sang on three songs with the group: "Fishin' 4 Religion", "Give a Man a Fish" and "Tennessee". Farris performed "Tennessee" with Arrested Development on the 1992 MTV Movie Awards and The Arsenio Hall Show as well as being invited on the group's first national tour. After the success of "Tennessee", she began to receive media attention alongside the group, and Duff Marlo offered Farris a record deal, contingent upon Speech producing the project, but she rejected the offer in search of a deal where she would have artistic control. Farris began experiencing personal and business conflicts with Arrested Development's group leader, despite the success of "Tennessee" (the group's first and biggest hit in 1992). Farris was never an official member of the group, and she and the group parted ways in September 1992 before a show at the Fox Theater in Atlanta, Georgia after having an argument with group leader Speech and co-leader Headliner.

=== Wild Seed – Wild Flower ===
Farris reached out to Milton Davis and David Harris and began a collaboration. A demo sent to Sony Music was first reviewed by Bobby Colomby, then by Randy Jackson (who became known as a judge on American Idol). Jackson signed Farris to a deal at Columbia Records. Her debut album, Wild Seed – Wild Flower (1994), featured the 1995 single "I Know", which reached number four on the Billboard Hot 100 and was nominated for the Grammy Award for Best Female Pop Vocal Performance in 1996. In the UK Singles Chart, "I Know" peaked (after a re-release) at No. 41 in May 1995. Wild Seed – Wild Flower reached No. 57 on the Billboard 200 chart. Radio & Records magazine ranked "I Know" as the number-one most played song on mainstream Top 40/CHR radio stations for 1995 and spent 10 consecutive weeks at No. 1 on the Mainstream Top 40 chart (April 1 – June 3, 1995).

On April 8, 1995, she was the musical guest on Saturday Night Live, performing "I Know" and a roots acoustic rendition of the Beatles song "Blackbird."

=== Soundtracks ===
In 1995, her version of Billy Taylor's "I Wish I Knew How It Would Feel to Be Free" appeared on the soundtrack to the documentary The Promised Land. It appeared again as the opening song to the film Ghosts of Mississippi, about the true story of the 1994 trial of Byron De La Beckwith, the white supremacist accused of the 1963 assassination of civil rights activist Medgar Evers. Farris' soundtrack work continued for the movie The Truth About Cats & Dogs, in which she contributed a version of the Stevie Wonder classic "For Once in My Life" as the closing song and the movie The First Wives Club with a rendition of Bill Withers' "Heartbreak Road". Her single "Hopeless" (written by Van Hunt) appears on the Love Jones soundtrack (1997).

=== For Truth If Not Love ===
Farris recorded a second album For Truth if Not Love but she experienced creative differences with the label she was signed to, Columbia Records, and the album went unreleased by Columbia. A contract dispute between Farris and the label followed and the label subsequently released Farris. The album was released approximately twelve years later in 2007, issued on iTunes.

=== Independent releases ===
Farris released her official follow-up album Signs of Life in (2011), named Top 10 soul albums of 2011, a mixtape Lady Dy, the Mixtape Pt 1 (2011) and a live jazz album Dionne Get Your Gunn: Featuring the Russell Gunn Quartet with Dionne Farris (2012) via PledgeMusic crowd funding on her own record label, Free & Clear Records.

== Personal life ==
Farris has a daughter, rapper Baby Tate, whose father is former Follow for Now member David Ryan Harris.

== Discography ==
=== Albums ===
- Wild Seed – Wild Flower (1994), Columbia
- For Truth If Not Love (2007), Music World
- Signs of Life, (2011), Free & Clear Records
- Dionne Get Your Gunn (2013), Free & Clear Records
- DionneDionne (2014), Free & Clear Records

=== Mixtapes ===
- Lady Dy, The Mixtape pt. 1 (2011), Free & Clear Records

=== Singles ===
- "I Know" (1995), Sony
- "Don't Ever Touch Me Again" (1995), Sony
- "Passion" (1996), Sony
- "Food for Thought" (1996), Sony [promo]
- "For Once in My Life" (1996), The Truth About Cats & Dogs (movie soundtrack)
- "Hopeless" (1997), Sony

=== Soundtracks ===
- The Promised Land (1994), Columbia
- The Truth About Cats & Dogs (1996), A&M
- First Wives Club (1996), Work Group
- Ghosts of Mississippi (1996), Sony
- Love Jones (1997), Sony
