= Matt Sherrod =

American drummer (born 1968)

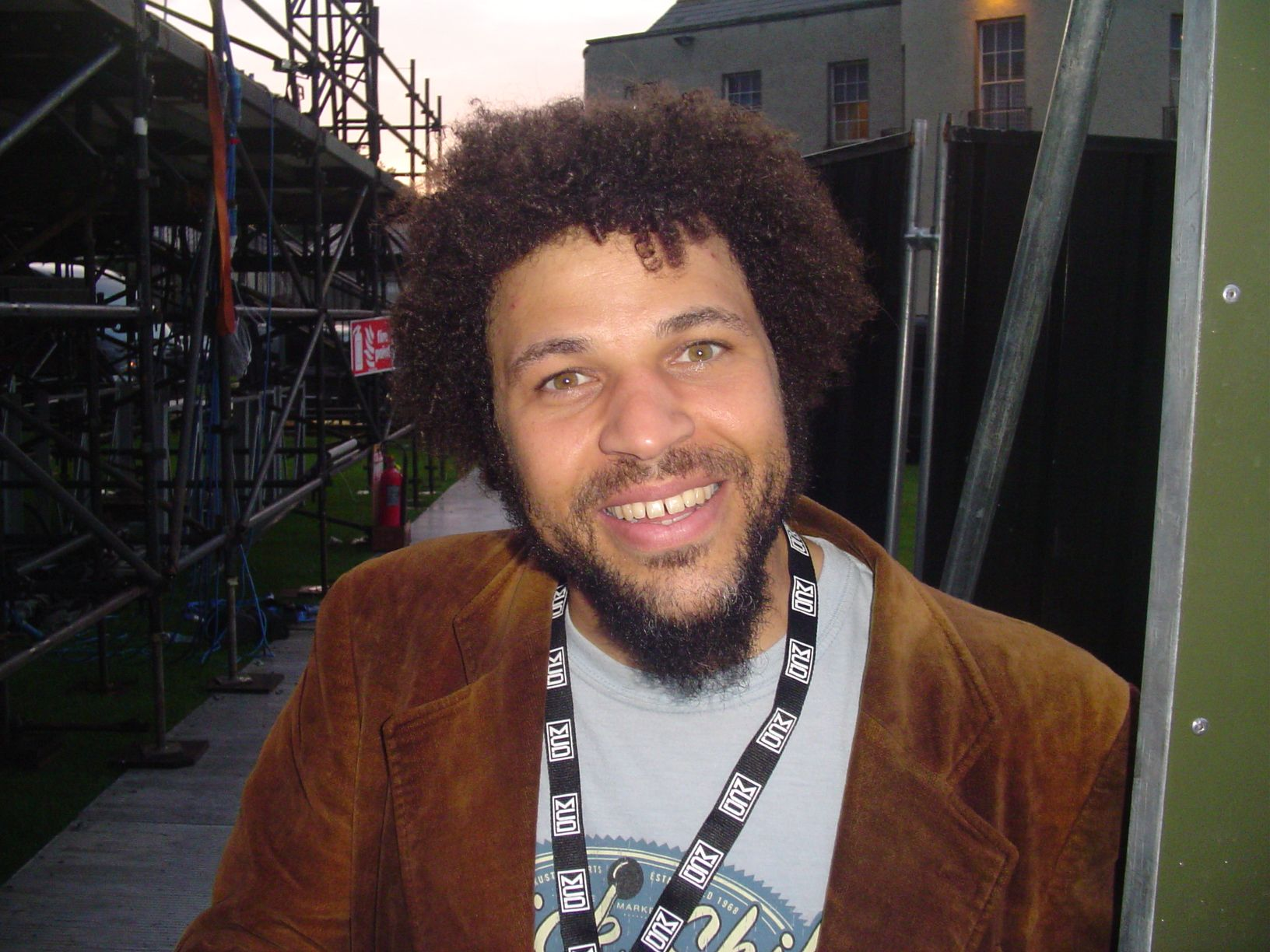
- Sherrod pictured in 2007

Background information
- Born: July 11, 1968 (age 58); California
- Genres: Rock
- Instruments: Drums
- Years active: 1988 – present
- Formerly of: Crowded House

Matthew Sherrod (born 11 July 1968) is an American drummer, musician, and a former member of the band Crowded House. Sherrod first became known as a musician playing drums for rock artist Beck. In 2007, following the 2005 death of Crowded House's drummer, Paul Hester, Sherrod was selected as a member of the band's reunion.

== History ==
Matthew Jackson "Matt" Sherrod, born July 11, 1968, was brought up in Southern California. Having been interested in music from a young age, he began playing the drums when he was 9 years old and piano when he was 12 years old.

In early 2007, following the death of their original drummer Paul Hester, Neil Finn decided to reform the rock group Crowded House. The band held auditions for drummers and Sherrod was invited to join, on the condition that it was a permanent arrangement. Sherrod accepted and joined the band. Finn has stated in interviews that he selected Sherrod based both on his musical ability and relative lack of familiarity with the band, their history and their music, as this would bring a new angle to the band. In another interview, Finn stated "Matt is his own man. I think that was what we like about him and he actually didn't know a lot about Crowded House but he responded to the songs. And it felt very exciting for us. The choice was kind of obvious in the end."

Sherrod plays drums on the album Time on Earth on four tracks, including lead single "Don't Stop Now". He also contributes backing vocals to one song on the album. The band returned to the studio in 2008 to begin recording a full album with the new lineup. This album became Intriguer, and was released on June 11, 2010. Sherrod played with the band full time through 2011, appearing for four last shows in 2016.

== Other projects ==
In addition to Beck and Crowded House, Sherrod has contributed to various musical recordings including writing music for Tracie Spencer with his brother Paul Sherrod and participating in the Beck-composited metal band Wounded Cougar. He has also produced and worked with groups such as NOFX, Macy Gray, Seiko Matsuda, Donna De Lory, and others.

Sherrod is the drummer on the 1991 release of the Atlanta funk rock quint Follow for Now. On their debut and only CD Sherrod is the studio drummer on eleven of the twelve songs. Matt and Paul Sherrod are also credited with producing the Follow for Now CD with the exception of the one song that Matt did not play on.

Sherrod is ambidextrous and performs some tasks with his left hand and some with his right. As a drummer, he plays left-handed. Sherrod is sponsored by Vater drumsticks and uses Zildjian K series cymbals.
