= David Ryan Harris =

American singer-songwriter (born 1968)

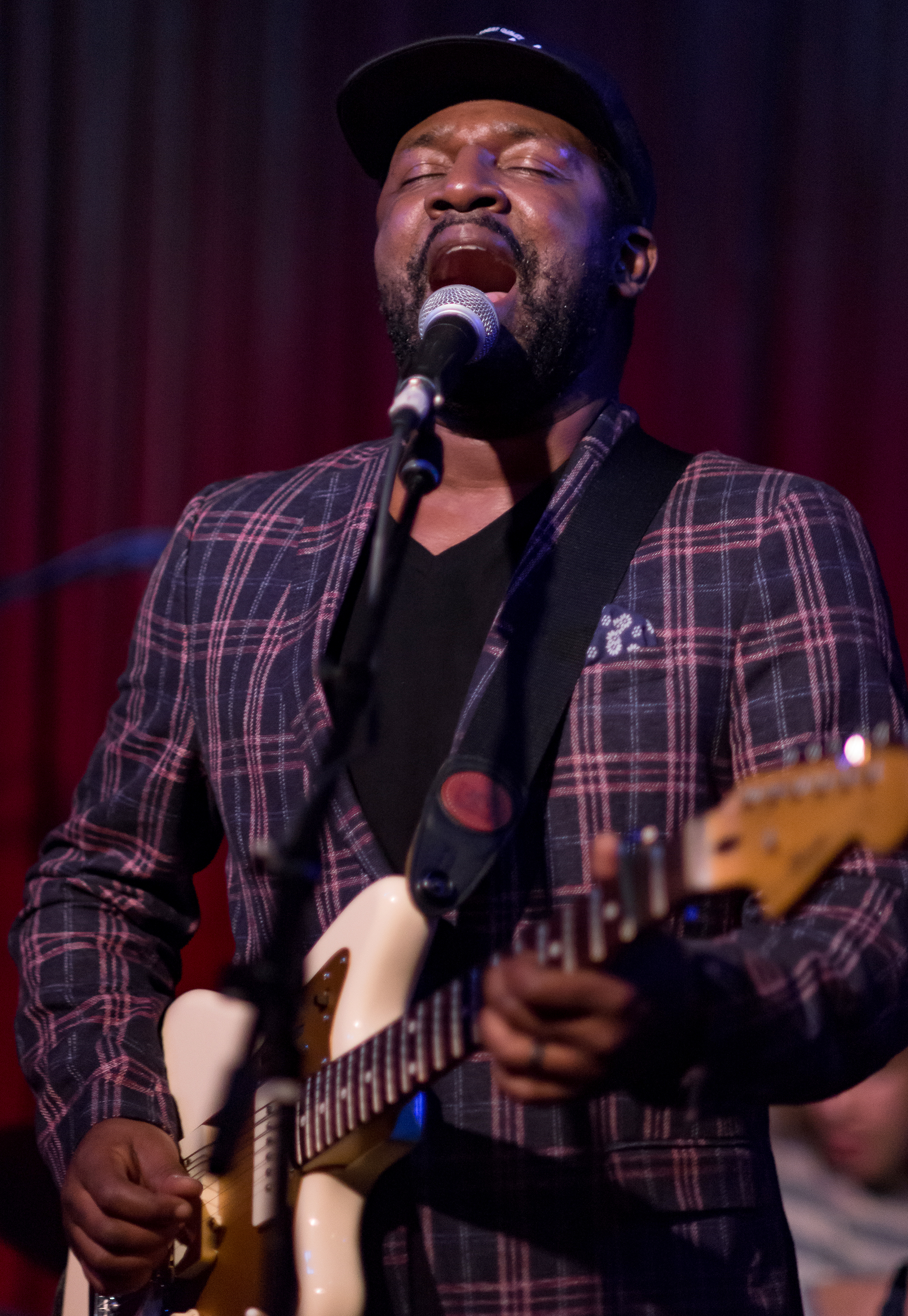
- Harris performing in 2017

Background information
- Born: 1967 or 1968 (age 57–58); Evanston, Illinois, U.S

David Ryan Harris (born 1967 or 1968) is an American singer-songwriter and guitarist based in Los Angeles, California, United States. Born in Evanston, Illinois, Harris moved to Atlanta at a young age. Harris has had a varied career as a musician.

== Influences ==
Harris has cited artists including Stevie Wonder, Paul McCartney, and Prince as influences. His solo music ranges in genre from folk to rhythm and blues.

== Career ==
=== Follow for Now ===
Harris has been performing on stage since the 1980s when he served as frontman for the Atlanta rock group Follow for Now. Harris' eclectic taste in music is apparent in the band's music, which shows influences ranging from Motown to thrash metal. Follow for Now was given a record deal through Chrysalis Records and after working with producer Brendan O'Brien, released their self-titled album in 1991. The band toured with such acts as Fishbone, HR of Bad Brains, Pearl Jam, Faith No More and 24–7 Spyz. The band members parted ways in 1994.

=== Solo career ===
After a short period out of the limelight, Harris began working as a producer and featured guitarist with Dionne Farris, a former vocalist from hip-hop group Arrested Development. Harris’ guitar work can be heard throughout Farris’ 1995 album Wild Seed, Wild Flower.

Harris worked with Farris until he launched his solo career in 1997. He reunited with Brendan O'Brien and was signed to Columbia Records, where the two would produce Harris’ solo debut. While the album was praised by critics, Harris’ range of musical influences made the album difficult to sell and he soon moved on to his next project.

=== Brand New Immortals ===
Still working with O’Brien, Harris united with drummer Kenny Creswell and former Black Crowes bassist Johnny Colt to create the trio Brand New Immortals. The group released a successful 6 track EP and was signed to Elektra Records by Lars Ulrich of Metallica. In 2001, the trio produced an album entitled Tragic Show, which the band felt that Elektra did not properly promote. Early the next year the band broke up and Harris returned to the pursuit of success as a solo artist.

=== 2002–present ===
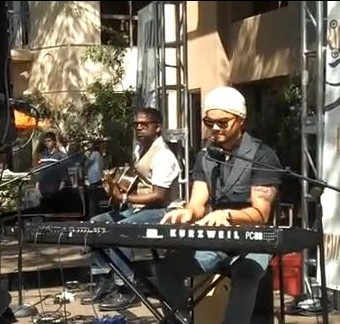
David Ryan Harris and Guy Sebastian performing at a BMI showcase at SXSW March 2009

While Harris continues to promote his solo act, he can frequently be seen on stage performing with artists such as John Mayer, Dave Matthews, and Santana. Along with artists such as Sister Hazel, Better Than Ezra, and Collective Soul, Harris has also performed on The Rock Boat music festival from 2002 to 2009.

In March 2009, Harris performed with Australian musician Guy Sebastian at SXSW, in Austin, Texas. He also performed with Steve Cropper and Sebastian at the 9th NON-COMMvention in Philadelphia in May 2009. Harris and Sebastian have had a long association. In 2004 Sebastian recorded "Sweetest Berry" which is a David Ryan Harris written song for his second album Beautiful Life. In 2006, Harris co-wrote two songs with Sebastian on his third album Closer to the Sun. In 2009 he co-wrote four tracks with Sebastian for his fifth album, including the title track "Like it Like That". Harris also played on and produced this single which reached number one and triple platinum in Australia and was the highest selling Australian artist song of 2009. Harris co-produced the album and contributed backing vocals and played instruments on some of the tracks. The album was released in the US in 2010. In 2012 Harris co-wrote "Battle Scars" with Sebastian. The song which has a rap written and performed by Lupe Fiasco reached number one and 9× platinum in Australia. It also reached number two and double platinum in New Zealand, and number two in Norway. "Battle Scars" spent 20 weeks on the US Billboard Hot 100 Chart peaking at number 71, and was certified platinum for 1 million sales. Ryan Harris toured Australia with Sebastian on the 46-date Get Along Tour in 2013.

Harris has also played guitar on the album Who I Am from Nick Jonas and the Administration which was released on February 2, 2010, but former New Power Generation bassist Sonny Thompson will replace him for live shows. In late 2011, Harris produced Australian singer-songwriter Amali Ward's debut album Back in Time. In late 2012, Harris joined Bon Jovi guitarist Richie Sambora's solo band for a short tour of Europe and North America. Harris also appeared in the television special Next at the Kennedy Center (Sara Bareilles: New Year’s Eve with the National Symphony Orchestra & Friends) as a friend and collaborator.

== Personal life ==
Harris is married and has five sons: Miles, Life, River, Truman and Hendrix. Harris also has a daughter with singer Dionne Farris named Tate Farris, a rapper who performs as Baby Tate.

In September 2023, Harris and two of his children, who are biracial, were stopped by American Airlines officials while deplaning after a trip from Atlanta to Los Angeles on suspicion he was a child trafficker. After being allowed to resume their trip, but having initially received no apology, he posted about the experience to Instagram and received an apology, which he accepted, telling People he had told American to let the cabin attendant know he "wholeheartedly accept[s] and appreciate[s] her apology”. He posted to Instagram, "I’ve never begrudged the red flag, I’ve always begrudged the apparent lack of diligence on the part of the flight attendant." He told the New York Times he had begun filing a petition to require minors travel with identification to remove the burden of assessing situations possibly involving child trafficking from cabin attendants. He told People, “The line of defense [against child trafficking] should not be on the plane”.
