= Crowded House =

Australian and New Zealand pop rock band

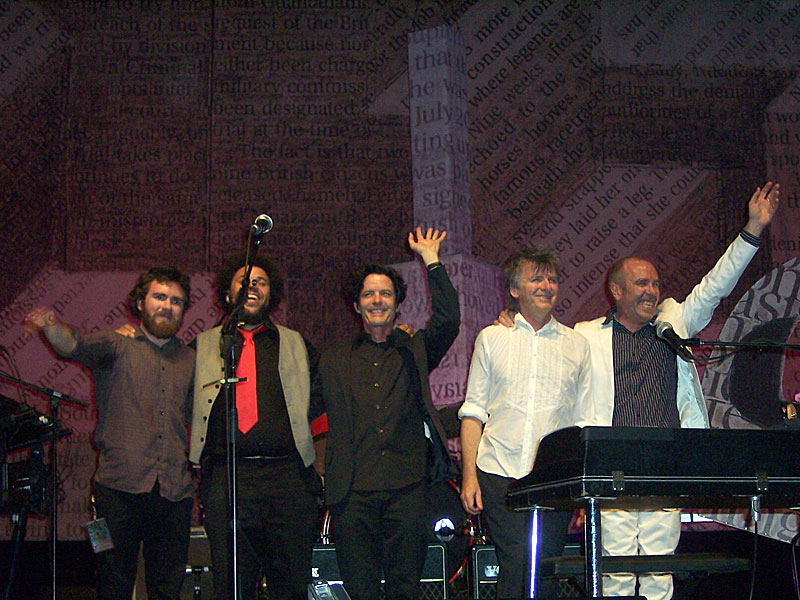
- Crowded House, August 2007 (L–R); Liam Finn, Matt Sherrod, Mark Hart, Neil Finn, Nick Seymour

Background information
- Also known as: The Mullanes (1985)
- Origin: Melbourne, Victoria, Australia
- Genres: Pop rock; jangle pop; alternative rock
- Years active: 1985–1996; 2006–2011; 2016; 2019–present
- Labels: Capitol; ATO; Parlophone; EMI Australia; BMG
- Spinoffs: Finn Brothers; Tarmac Adam
- Spinoff of: Split Enz
- Members: Neil Finn; Nick Seymour; Mitchell Froom; Liam Finn; Elroy Finn
- Past members: Craig Hooper; Paul Hester; Tim Finn; Peter Jones; Mark Hart; Matt Sherrod
- Website: crowdedhouse.com

Crowded House are a New Zealand/Australian rock band, formed in 1985 in Melbourne, Victoria, Australia. The band's founding members were New Zealander Neil Finn (vocalist, guitarist, primary songwriter), Paul Hester (drums), and Nick Seymour (bass). Later band members included Mitchell Froom, Finn's brother Tim, Finn's sons Liam and Elroy, and Americans Mark Hart and Matt Sherrod. Neil Finn and Seymour are the band's sole constant members.

Originally active from 1985 to 1996, Crowded House had consistent commercial and critical success in Australia and New Zealand. They achieved success in the United States with their self-titled debut album, which provided the Top Ten hits "Don't Dream It's Over" and "Something So Strong". Further international success came in the UK, mainland Europe and South Africa in the early 1990s with their third and fourth albums (Woodface and Together Alone) and the compilation album Recurring Dream, which included the hits "Weather with You" and "Distant Sun". Neil and Tim Finn were each awarded an OBE in June 1993 for their contributions to the music of New Zealand.

Crowded House disbanded in 1996 following several farewell concerts that year, including the "Farewell to the World" concerts in Melbourne and Sydney. Hester died by suicide in 2005. A year later, the group re-formed with drummer Matt Sherrod and released two further albums (Time on Earth and Intriguer), each of which reached number one in Australia. After going on another hiatus, the band reunited in 2020 with a new line-up featuring Neil Finn, Nick Seymour, Mitchell Froom, and Finn's sons Liam and Elroy. Their most recent album, Gravity Stairs, was released in 2024.

As of 2021, Crowded House have sold over 15 million albums worldwide. In November 2016, the band was inducted into the ARIA Hall of Fame.

== History ==
Neil Finn (vocals, guitar, piano) and drummer Paul Hester (the Cheks, Deckchairs Overboard) were both former members of New Zealand band Split Enz, which spent part of 1975–76 in Australia and several years in England. Neil Finn is the younger brother of Split Enz founding member Tim Finn, who joined Crowded House in 1990 on vocals, guitars and keyboards for the album Woodface. Bassist Nick Seymour (Plays with Marionettes, Bang, the Horla) is the younger brother of singer-songwriter and guitarist Mark Seymour of Australian rock group Hunters & Collectors.

=== Formation and name change (1984–1986) ===
Finn and Hester decided to form a new band during the first Split Enz farewell tour, "Enz with a Bang", in late 1984. Seymour approached Finn during the afterparty for the Melbourne show and asked if he could audition for the new band. The Mullanes formed in Melbourne in early 1985 with Finn, Hester, Seymour and guitarist Craig Hooper (the Reels) and first performed on 11 June. They secured a record contract with Capitol Records, but Hooper left the band before the remaining trio moved to Los Angeles to record their debut album.

At Capitol's behest, the band's name was changed to Crowded House, which alluded to the lack of space at the small Hollywood Hills house they shared during the recording of the album Crowded House. Former Split Enz keyboardist Eddie Rayner produced the track "Can't Carry On" and was asked to join the band. He toured with them in 1988, but was unable to become a full member due to family commitments.

=== Early albums (1986–1990) ===
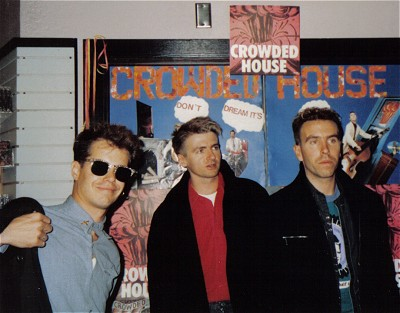
Crowded House, San Francisco, April 1987. L to R: Paul Hester, Neil Finn, Nick Seymour

Thanks to their Split Enz connection, the newly formed Crowded House had an established Australasian fanbase. They began by playing at festivals in Australia and New Zealand and released their debut album, Crowded House, in August 1986. Capitol Records initially failed to see the band's potential and gave them only low-key promotion, forcing the band to play at small venues to try to gain attention. The album's first single, "Mean to Me", reached the Australian Kent Music Report Singles Chart top 30 in June. It failed to chart in the US, but moderate American airplay introduced US listeners to the group.

The next single, "Don't Dream It's Over", was released in October 1986 and proved an international hit, reaching number two on the US Billboard Hot 100 and number one in Canada. New Zealand radio stations initially gave the song little support until months later when it became internationally successful. Ultimately, the song reached number one on the New Zealand singles chart and number eight in Australia. It remains the group's most commercially successful song.

In March 1987 the group were awarded "Best New Talent", along with "Song of the Year" and "Best Video" awards for "Don't Dream It's Over", at the inaugural ARIA Music Awards. The video also earned the group the MTV Video Music Award for Best New Artist that year. The song has often been covered by other artists and gave Paul Young a hit single in 1991. It was also used for a New Zealand Tourism Board advertisement in its "100% Pure New Zealand" worldwide promotion from October 2005. In May 2001, "Don't Dream it's Over" was voted seventh in a poll of the best Australian songs of all time by the Australasian Performing Right Association.

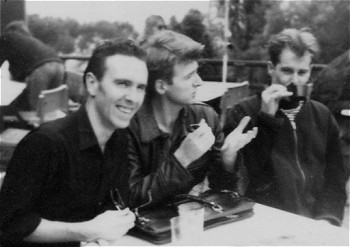
The band at the Montreux Pop Festival, May 1988. L to R: Seymour, Finn, Hester

In June 1987, nearly a year after its release, Crowded House finally reached number one on the Kent Music Report Album Charts. It also reached number three in New Zealand and number twelve in the US. The follow-up to "Don't Dream it's Over", "Something So Strong", was another global hit, reaching the Top 10 in New Zealand, the United States and Canada. "World Where You Live" and "Now We're Getting Somewhere" were also released as singles with chart success.

As the band's primary songwriter, Neil Finn was under pressure to create a second album to match their debut and the band joked that one potential title for the new release was Mediocre Follow-Up. Eventually titled Temple of Low Men, their second album was released in July 1988 with strong promotion by Capitol Records. The album did not fare as well as their debut in the US, only reaching number 40 and selling around 200,000 copies, but it achieved Australasian success, reaching number one in Australia and number two in New Zealand. The first single, "Better Be Home Soon", peaked at number two on both Australian and New Zealand singles charts and reached the top 50 in the US. The following four singles were less successful.

Crowded House undertook a short tour of Australia and Canada to promote the album, with Eddie Rayner on keyboards. Multi-instrumentalist Mark Hart, who would eventually become a full band member, replaced Rayner in January 1989. After the tour, Finn fired Seymour from the band. Music journalist Ed Nimmervoll claimed that Seymour's temporary departure was because Finn blamed him for causing his writer's block; however, Finn cited "artistic differences" as the reason. Seymour said that after a month he contacted Finn and they agreed that he would return to the band.

=== Early 1990s (1991–1994) ===
Crowded House took a break after the Canadian leg of the Temple of Low Men tour. Neil Finn and his brother Tim recorded songs they had co-written for their own album, Finn. Following the recording sessions with Tim, Neil began writing and recording a third Crowded House album with Hester and Seymour, but these tracks were rejected by the record company, so Neil asked Tim if Crowded House could use the Finn songs. Tim jokingly agreed on the proviso that he become a member, which Neil apparently took literally. With Tim as an official member, the band returned to the studio.

The new tracks, as well as some from the previously rejected recordings were combined to make Woodface, which was released in July 1991. The album features eight tracks co-written by Neil and Tim, which feature the brothers harmonising on lead vocals, except on the sombre "All I Ask" on which Tim sang lead. The track was later used on AIDS awareness commercials in Australia. Five of the album's tracks were Neil's solo compositions and two were by Hester, the exuberant "Italian Plastic", which became a crowd favourite at concerts, and the hidden track "I'm Still Here".

"Chocolate Cake", a humorous comment on American excesses that was not taken well by some US critics and sections of the American public was released in June 1991 as the first single. It failed to chart in the US; however, it reached number two on Billboard's Modern Rock Tracks chart. The song peaked at number seven in New Zealand and reached the top 20 in Australia. The second single, "Fall at Your Feet", was less successful in Australia and New Zealand but did at least reach the US Hot 100. The album reached number one in New Zealand, number two in Australia, number six in the UK and made the top 20 in several other European countries. The third single from Woodface, "Weather With You", peaked at No. 7 in early 1992 giving the band their highest UK chart placement. By contrast, the album had limited success in the US, only reaching number 83 on the Billboard 200 Album Chart and selling 225,000 copies.

Despite the success of the album, Tim Finn left Crowded House suddenly part-way through the UK leg of the Woodface tour, a few hours before the band were due to play at King Tut's Club in Glasgow on 1 November 1991. Neil Finn noted that "on stage, it just didn't feel right for us or him. We're very off-the-cuff and conversational, whereas Tim is into creating a spectacle and the two approaches don't gel all that well ... We'd all open our mouths at the same time and then stop and go, Oh, after you. From Tim's point of view it was quite a relief to put it all on the table, I think. For half the set he was standing there with his acoustic guitar, not really feeling part of it." Paul Hester commented that "both sides felt good about parting before it could get ugly".

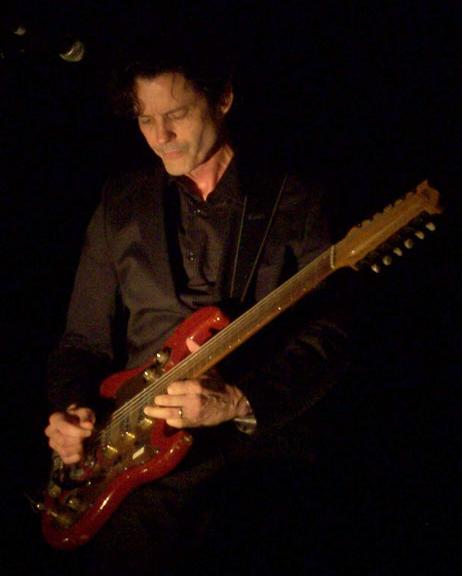
Multi-instrumentalist Mark Hart

Performances on the UK tour, at the Town and Country Club in London, were recorded live and given a limited release in Australia, while individual songs from those shows were released as B-sides of singles in some countries. In June 1993 the New Zealand government recommended that the Queen award an OBE to Neil and Tim Finn for their contribution to the music of New Zealand.

For their fourth album, Together Alone, Crowded House used producer Martin Glover (aka "Youth") and invited touring musician Mark Hart (guitar and keyboards) to become a permanent band member. The album was recorded at Karekare Beach, New Zealand, which gave its name to the opening track, "Kare Kare". The album was released in October 1993 and sold well internationally on the strength of lead single "Distant Sun" and follow-up "Private Universe". It topped the New Zealand Album Chart, reached number 2 in Australia and number 4 in the UK. "Locked Out" was the album's first US single and received airplay on MTV and VH1. This track and "My Sharona" by the Knack, which were both included on the soundtrack of the film Reality Bites, were bundled together on a jukebox single to promote the film soundtrack.

=== Saying farewell (1994–1996) ===
Crowded House were midway through a US tour when Paul Hester quit the band on 15 April 1994. He flew home to Melbourne to await the birth of his first child and indicated that he required more time with his family. Wally Ingram, drummer for support act Sheryl Crow, temporarily filled in until a replacement, Peter Jones (ex-Harem Scarem, Vince Jones, Kate Ceberano's Septet) was found. After the tour, the Finn Brothers released their album Finn in November 1995. In June 1996, at a press conference to announce the release of their greatest hits album Recurring Dream, Neil revealed that Crowded House were to disband. The June 1996 concerts in Europe and Canada were to be their final performances.

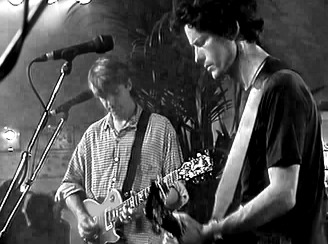
Crowded House at the Café De Kroon, Amsterdam, June 1996. Neil Finn (left) and Mark Hart

Recurring Dream contained four songs from each of the band's studio albums, along with three new songs. The album debuted at number one in Australia, New Zealand and the UK in July 1996. Early copies included a bonus CD of live material. The album's three new songs, which were released as singles, were "Instinct", "Not the Girl You Think You Are" and "Everything Is Good for You", which featured backing vocals from Pearl Jam's Eddie Vedder. Paul Hester returned to the band to play drums on the three new tracks.

Worried that their goodbye had been too low-key and had disregarded their home fans, the band performed the Farewell to the World concert on the steps of the Sydney Opera House on 24 November 1996, which raised funds for the Sydney Children's Hospital. The concert featured the line-up of Neil Finn, Nick Seymour, Mark Hart and Paul Hester. Tim Finn and Peter Jones both made guest appearances. Support bands on the day were Custard, Powderfinger and You Am I. The concert had one of the largest live audiences in Australian history with the crowd being estimated at between 120,000 and 250,000 people. Farewell to the World was released on VHS in December 1996. In 2007, a double CD and a DVD were issued to commemorate the concert's tenth anniversary. The DVD featured newly recorded audio commentary by Finn, Hart and Seymour and other new bonus material.

=== Between farewell and reunion (1996–2006) ===
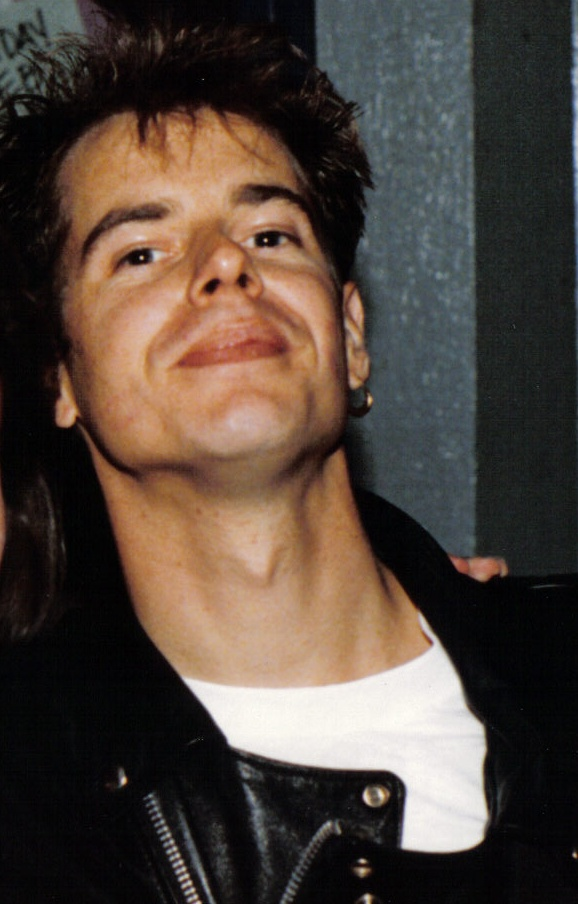
Paul Hester (1959–2005)

In May 1999, Crowded House issued a compilation of unreleased songs, Afterglow, which included the track "Recurring Dream", recorded when the group were still called the Mullanes and included Craig Hooper on guitar. The album's liner notes included information about the songs written by music journalist David Hepworth. Some limited-release versions included a second CD with songwriting commentary by Finn. The liner notes confirmed that Crowded House had no plans to reunite at that time.

A 2003 Crowded House compilation album, Classic Masters, was released only in the US, while 2005 saw the release of the album She Will Have Her Way, a collection of cover versions of Crowded House, Split Enz, Tim Finn and Finn Brothers songs by Australasian female artists. The album reached the top 5 in Australia and New Zealand.

On 26 March 2005, Paul Hester died by suicide in a park near his home in Melbourne. He was 46 years old. His obituary in The Sydney Morning Herald stated that he had fought "a long battle with depression". Following the news of Hester's death, Nick Seymour joined the Finn Brothers on stage at the Royal Albert Hall in London, where the three played in memory of Hester. A snare drum with a top hat on it stood at the front of the stage as a tribute.

=== Reunion and Time on Earth (2006–2009) ===
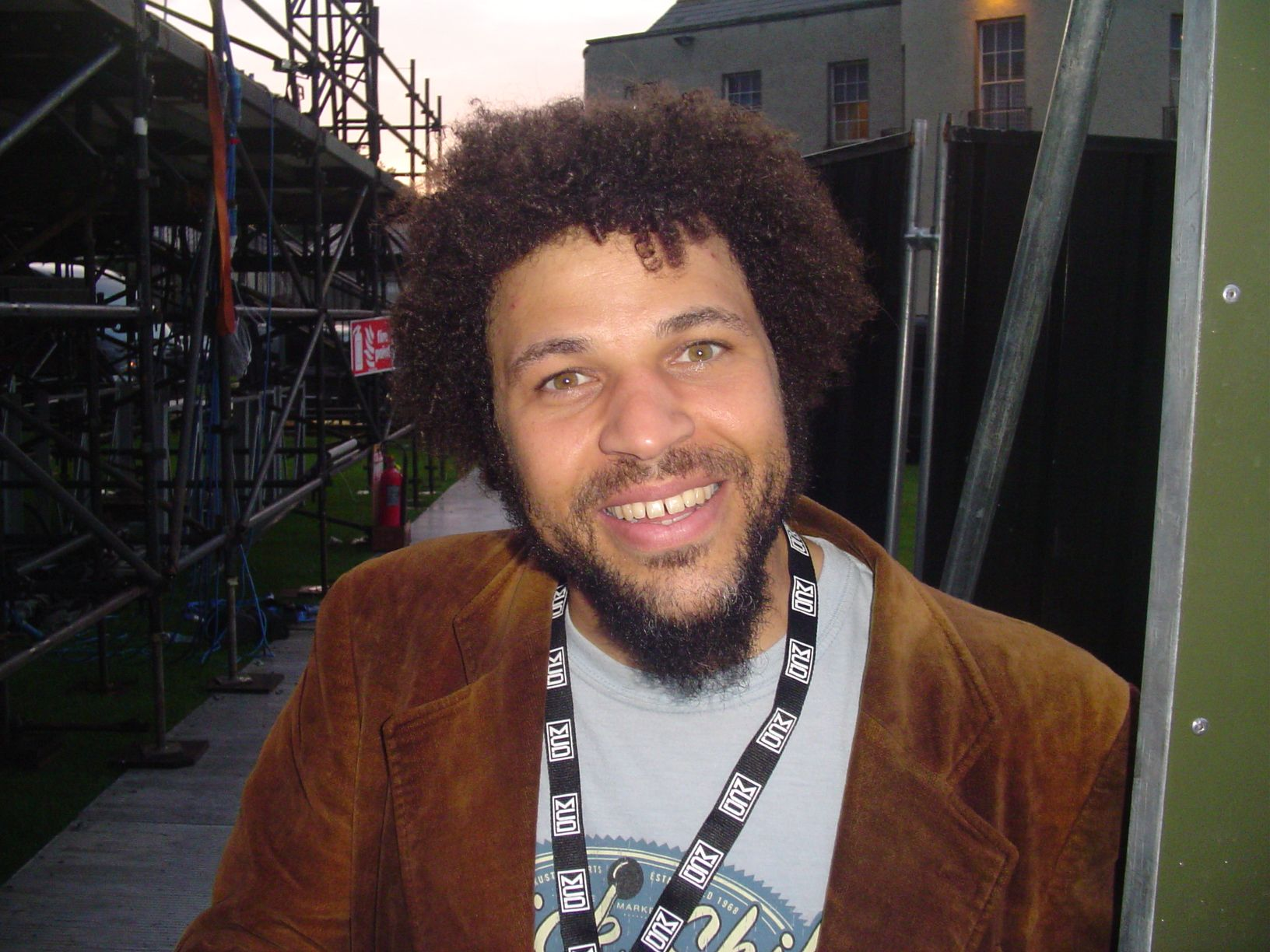
Matt Sherrod, Dublin, 2007

In 2006 Neil Finn asked Nick Seymour to play bass on his third solo album. Seymour agreed and the two joined with producer and multi-instrumentalist Ethan Johns to begin recording. As the recording sessions progressed it was decided that the album would be issued under the Crowded House band name rather than as a Neil Finn solo album. In January 2007, the group publicly announced their re-formation and on 23 February, after 20 days of auditions, former Beck drummer Matt Sherrod joined Finn, Seymour and Mark Hart to complete the new lineup. As Sherrod and Hart had not participated in the initial sessions, four new tracks were recorded with producer Steve Lillywhite including the album's first single "Don't Stop Now".

On 17 March 2007 the band played a live show at their rehearsal studio in front of around fifty fans, friends and family. The performance was streamed live as a webcast. The two-and-a-half-hour set included some new tracks, including "Silent House" co-written by Finn with the Dixie Chicks. A concert onboard The Thekla, moored in Bristol, followed on 19 March. Crowded House played at the Marquee Theatre in Tempe, Arizona on 26 April as a warm-up for their appearance at the Coachella Festival on 29 April in Indio, California. They played at the Australian Live Earth concert in Sydney on 7 July. The next day, Finn and Seymour were interviewed on Rove Live and the band, with Hart and Sherrod, performed "Don't Stop Now" to promote the new album, which was titled Time on Earth. The single was a minor hit in Australia and the UK. The album was released worldwide in June and July. It topped the album chart in New Zealand and made number 2 in Australia and number 3 in the UK.

=== Intriguer, second split and Sydney Opera House shows (2009–2018) ===
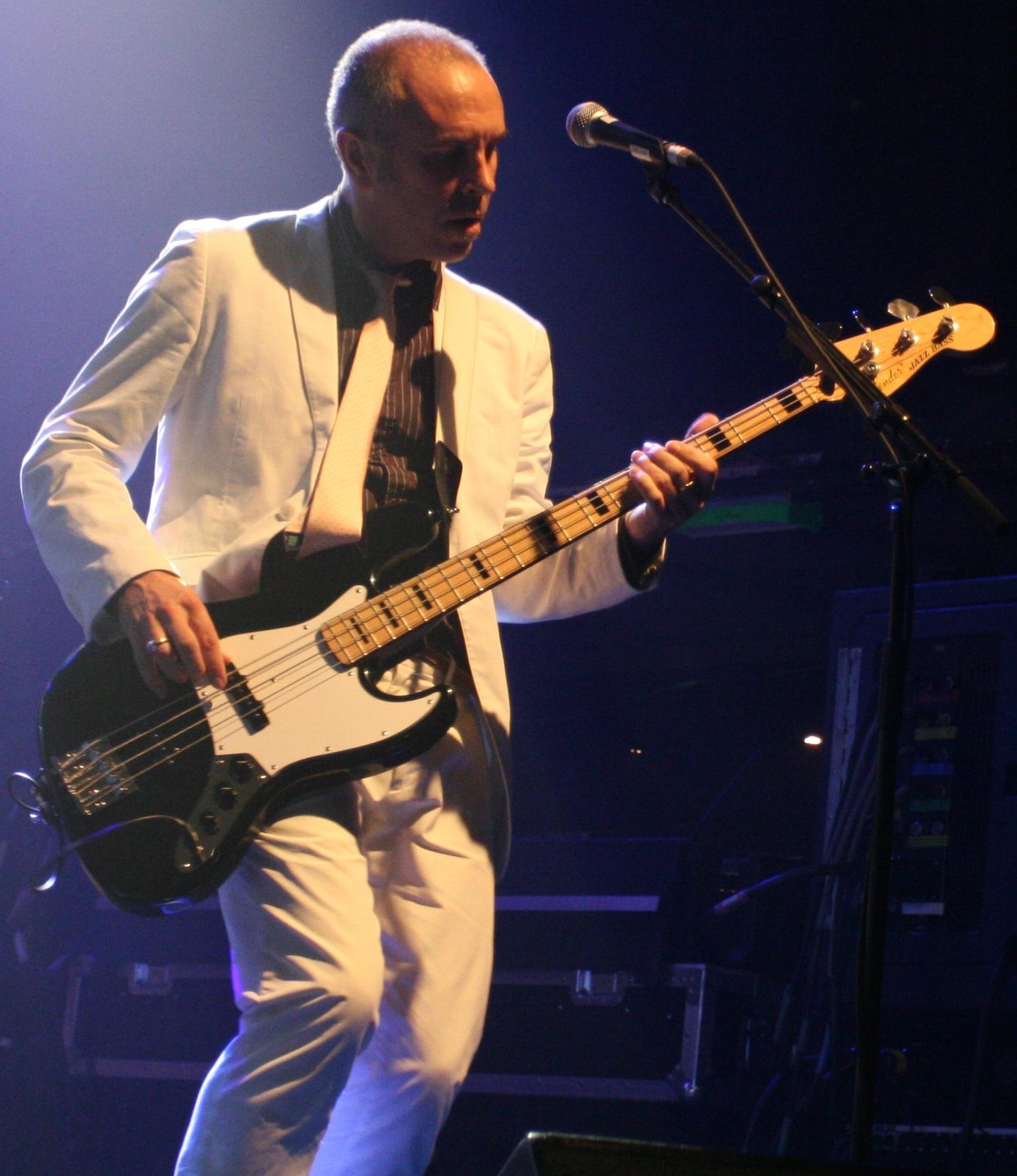
Nick Seymour, Barcelona, October 2007

Crowded House began recording their follow-up to Time on Earth in April 2009, at Finn's own Roundhead Studios. The album, Intriguer, was produced by Jim Scott who had worked on The Sun Came Out by Neil's 7 Worlds Collide project. In August 2009, Finn travelled to Los Angeles to record some overdubs at Jim Scott's Los Angeles studio before they began mixing tracks. The album was released in June 2010, in time for the band's appearance at the West Coast Blues & Roots Festival near Perth. Finn stated that the album contains some, "Unexpected twists and turns" and some songs that, "Sound like nothing we've done before." Intriguer topped the Australian album chart, reached number 3 in New Zealand and number 12 in the UK.

A new compilation album, The Very Very Best of Crowded House, was released in October 2010 to celebrate the band's 25th anniversary.

Following the success of the album She Will Have Her Way in 2005, a second album of cover versions of Finn Brothers songs (including Crowded House songs) was released on 12 November 2010. Entitled He Will Have His Way, all tracks are performed by Australasian male artists.

In November 2011 an Australian tour featured artists involved with the "She Will Have Her Way" and "He Will Have His Way" projects, including Paul Dempsey, Clare Bowditch, Seeker Lover Keeper (Sarah Blasko, Sally Seltmann and Holly Throsby), Alexander Gow (Oh Mercy) and Lior. The band played what would be their last concert for over five years at the A Day on the Green festival in Auckland on 27 February 2011.

Former Crowded House drummer Peter Jones died from brain cancer on 18 May 2012, aged 49. A statement issued by the band described him as "A warm-hearted, funny and talented man, who was a valuable member of Crowded House."

In September 2015 the song "Help is Coming", from the Afterglow album, was released as a download and limited edition 7" single to raise money for the Save the Children charity. The B-side, "Anthem", was a previously unreleased track, recorded at the same demo session as "Help is Coming" in 1995, with vocals added in 2015. Peter Jones plays drums on both songs. The money was used to provide shelter, water, sanitation and hygiene for refugees in Syria, Lebanon and Iraq. Neil Finn said of "Help Is Coming" that "It was always a song about refugees, even if at the time I was thinking about the immigrants setting off on ships from Europe to America, looking for a better life for their families. There is such a huge scale and urgency to the current refugee crises that barely a day goes by without some crushing image or news account to confront us. We can't be silent any more."

Neil Finn confirmed in a 2016 interview with the Dutch newspaper Volkskrant that Crowded House had been on indefinite hiatus since the end of the Intriguer tour. Later that year, however, he and Seymour announced a series of concerts at the Sydney Opera House to mark the 20th anniversary of the Farewell to the World show (24 November 1996). The band, with the same lineup as its initial reunion and Tim Finn as guest, performed four shows between 24 and 27 November 2016.

=== Re-formation, new line-up and Dreamers Are Waiting (2019–2023) ===
In August 2019, Crowded House announced a reunion show at the 2020 Byron Bay Bluesfest. Shortly afterwards, Mark Hart announced that he would not be involved in the group's reunion. Finn confirmed Hart's departure on his podcast Fangradio, noting that he "love[s] Hart dearly as a friend, as a contributor and a collaborator" and that "all will be revealed... trust that good thought and good heart gets put into all of these decisions."

On 15 October 2020, the band released "Whatever You Want", the first single from the band in over a decade. The band also shared an accompanying music video, starring Mac DeMarco.

On 17 February 2021, the band shared another single, "To the Island." The track serves as the second single to the band's seventh studio album, Dreamers Are Waiting, which was announced on the same day for release on 4 June 2021. The band supported the single with a national tour of New Zealand in March 2021.

On 19 August 2021, the band performed their single "To the Island" on CBS's The Late Show with Stephen Colbert. On 2 December 2021, the band announced that it will be touring Australia in 2022, with 6 shows around the country, including the 2022 Bluesfest lineup. On 24 June 2022, the band played at Glastonbury Festival.

=== Gravity Stairs (2024–present) ===
In February 2024, Crowded House released "Oh Hi" from their eighth album Gravity Stairs, which in turn was released on 31 May 2024.

Crowded House would later announce a North American tour for the album and release "Teenage Summer" as the second single, before later adding both a tour of Europe in October and a New Zealand and Australian tour beginning in November.

== Style ==
=== Songwriting and musical influences ===
As the primary songwriter for the band, Neil Finn has always set the tone for the band's sound. AllMusic said that Finn "has consistently proven his knack for crafting high-quality songs that combine irresistible melodies with meticulous lyrical detail." Neil's brother Tim was an early and important musical influence. Neil first saw Tim play with Split Enz in 1972, and said "that performance and those first songs made a lasting impression on me." His mother was another significant musical influence, encouraging him to listen to a variety of genres, including Irish folk music and Māori music. She would play piano at family parties and encourage Neil and Tim to accompany her.

=== Album covers, costumes and set design ===
Bassist Nick Seymour, who is also an artist, designed or co-designed all of the band's album covers and interior artwork. He also designed some of the costumes worn by the group, notably those from the cover of the group's debut album Crowded House. Seymour collaborated with Finn and Hester on the set design of some of their early music videos, including "Don't Dream It's Over" and "Better Be Home Soon". Since the band reunited, Seymour has again designed their album covers.

The majority of the covers for the band's singles were not designed by Seymour. The artwork for "Pineapple Head" was created by Reg Mombassa of Mental As Anything. For the first four albums Mombassa and Noel Crombie, who had been the main designer of Split Enz's artwork, assisted Seymour in creating sets and costumes. For the Farewell to the World concerts Crombie designed the set, while Mombassa and Seymour designed promotional materials and artwork.

== Members ==
=== Current members ===
Image	Name	Years active	Instruments	Release contributions
	Neil Finn	1985–1996; 2006–2011; 2016; 2020–present	lead and backing vocals; guitars; keyboards; percussion; bass	all releases
	Nick Seymour	1985–1996; 2006–2011; 2016; 2020–present	bass; backing vocals; keyboards	all releases
	Mitchell Froom	2020–present (session 1986, 1987–1988, 1989–1991)	keyboards	Crowded House (1986); Temple of Low Men (1988); Woodface (1991); Dreamers Are Waiting (2021); Gravity Stairs (2024)
	Liam Finn	2020–present (touring member 2007–2008)	guitars; drums; backing and lead vocals	Time on Earth (2007); Intriguer (2010); Dreamers Are Waiting (2021); Gravity Stairs (2024)
	Elroy Finn	2020–present (touring member 2008, 2016)	drums; backing vocals; guitars; keyboards	Time on Earth (2007); Dreamers Are Waiting (2021); Gravity Stairs (2024)

=== Current touring members ===
Image	Name	Years active	Instruments	Release contributions
	Paul Taylor	2021–present	drums; percussion	Gravity Stairs (2024)

=== Former members ===
Image	Name	Years active	Instruments	Release contributions
	Paul Hester	1985–1994; 1996 (died 2005)	drums; percussion; keyboards; backing and lead vocals	all releases from Crowded House (1986) to Farewell to the World (1996)
	Craig Hooper	1985	guitars; backing vocals	Recurring Dream Afterglow (Crowded House album)
	Tim Finn	1990–1991 (session 1987–1988; live guest 1996, 2016)	lead and backing vocals; keyboards; guitars	Temple of Low Men (1988); Woodface (1991); Together Alone (1993); Farewell to the World (2006); Dreamers Are Waiting (2021); Gravity Stairs (2024)
	Mark Hart	1992–1996; 2007–2011; 2016 (touring member 1989–1992)	keyboards; guitar; lap steel; backing vocals	all releases from Woodface (1991) to Intriguer (2010)
	Peter Jones	1994–1996 (died 2012)	drums	Farewell to the World (1996) one track
	Matt Sherrod	2007–2011; 2016	drums; percussion; backing vocals	Time on Earth (2007); Intriguer (2010)

=== Former touring musicians ===
Image	Name	Years active	Instruments	Release contributions
	Gill Civil	1986	keyboards	none
	Miffy Smith	1986	keyboards	none
	Eddie Rayner	1987; 1988	keyboards	Crowded House (1986); Together Alone (1993); Time on Earth (2007)
	Mike Gubb	1988	keyboards	none
	Wally Ingram	1994	drums	none
	Jules Bowen	1994–1996	keyboards	none
	Davey Lane	2007	guitars; keyboards; backing vocals	none
	Don McGlashan	2008	guitars; keyboards; mandolin; euphonium; vocals	Time on Earth (2007); Intriguer (2010)

== Discography ==
Studio albums

- Crowded House (1986)
- Temple of Low Men (1988)
- Woodface (1991)
- Together Alone (1993)
- Time on Earth (2007)
- Intriguer (2010)
- Dreamers Are Waiting (2021)
- Gravity Stairs (2024)

== Awards ==
Crowded House have won several national and international awards. In Australia, the group have won 13 ARIA Awards from 36 nominations, including the inaugural Best New Talent in 1987. The majority of their wins were for their first two albums, Crowded House and Temple of Low Men. They won eight APRA Awards from eleven nominations and were nominated for the New Zealand Silver Scroll for "Don't Stop Now" in 2007. "Don't Dream It's Over" was named the seventh best Australian song of all time in 2001.

In 1987, Crowded House won the American MTV Video Music Award for Best New Artist for their song "Don't Dream It's Over", which was also nominated for three other awards. In 1994, the group was named International Group of the Year at the BRIT Awards.

In 2009, "Don't Dream It's Over" was ranked number fifty on the Triple J Hottest 100 of All Time as voted by the Australian public. In 2025 Triple J counted down the Hottest 100 of Australian Songs, with Crowded House featuring three times with the songs; "Don't Dream It's Over" number five, "Better Be Home Soon" number thirty eight and "Weather with You" number sixty nine.

In November 2016, 20 years after their formation, Crowded House were inducted into the ARIA Hall of Fame.

== See also ==
- Men at Work
- Music of Australia
- Music of New Zealand
