= Roundhead Studios =

Recording studio in New Zealand

Coordinates: 36°51′50″S 174°45′37″E

The logo for Roundhead Studios.

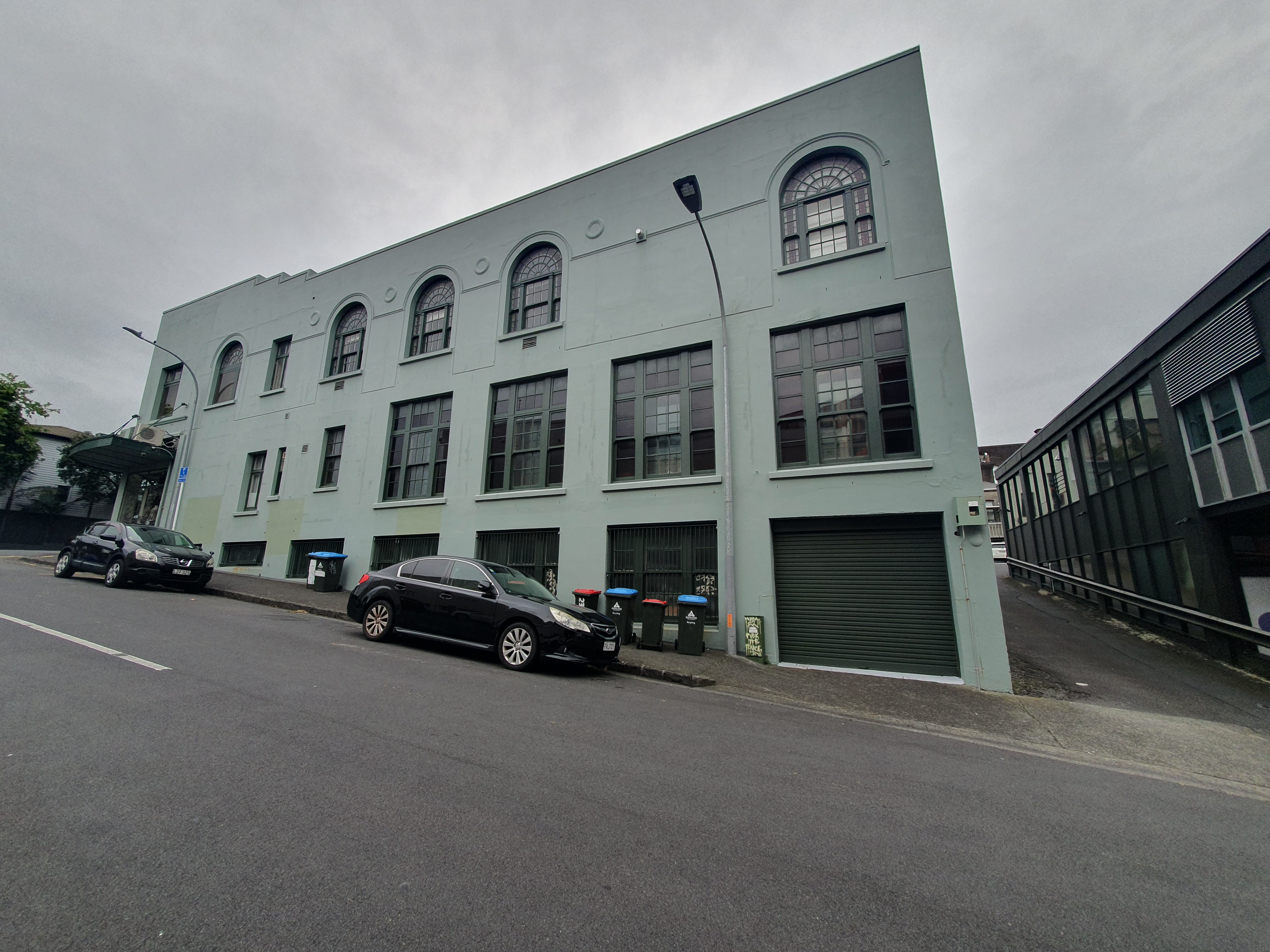
Roundhead Studios

Roundhead Studios is an Auckland-based sound recording studio owned by singer-songwriter Neil Finn. It was officially opened in June 2007, however by the time of its opening, several international artists had already used it whilst the studio was either in construction or receiving finishing touches.

Artists who have used the facility include Australian band Augie March, US rapper Kanye West, British Indie Rock band Foals, and a range of New Zealand–based artists, including Finn's son Liam Finn, Herriot Row, Eddie Rayner, Goldenhorse, Jan Hellriegel, the Topp Twins and Tim Finn. On 13 July 2007, Neil Finn brought his band Crowded House in and performed a set of songs live to New Zealand radio. Roundhead was also the recording location for 2009 Oxfam charity album The Sun Came Out, featuring members of Wilco, Johnny Marr, KT Tunstall, Phil Selway, Ed O'Brien, Sebastian Steinberg and local artists Don McGlashan, Bic Runga and Neil Finn. After recording for The Sun Came Out, members of Wilco took up residency at Roundhead to record the foundation tracks for their seventh studio album, Wilco (The Album).

Roundhead has two main studio spaces. Studio A features a Neve console which was originally built for The Who. This console was previously located at Bearsville Studios in upstate New York. Both vintage analogue equipment and modern digital recording equipment is available.

Between Studio A and the Brick Room studio below, in order to fully isolate the two studios, there is a 100mm thick concrete pad floating on rubber mounts. Studio A features sealed exterior window frames and panes and interior panes of heavy acoustic glass with a large air gap between them. These provide natural light, while keeping out the noise and vibration from the road outside.

Roundhead was also the name given to Neil Finn's previous home studio in Parnell, utilised by New Zealand bands including Garageland and The Stereo Bus in the late 1990s.

The name and logo for Roundhead Studios refer to the Round Head period of prehistoric art.
