= They Will Have Their Way =

Studio album by Various Artists
- Released: 28 October 2011
- Genres: Pop, rock, folk
- Label: EMI
- Producer: John O'Donnell

Various Artists chronology
He Will Have His Way (2010)	They Will Have Their Way (2011)

They Will Have Their Way is a compilation album featuring covers by New Zealand and Australian artists of songs originally written and performed by brothers Tim and Neil Finn. A successor to the highly successful 2005 album She Will Have Her Way and 2010 album He Will Have His Way, They Will Have Their Way includes tracks by both male and female artists, mainly from the two previous releases. The album was released 28 October 2011

They Will Have Their Way debuted at No. 31 on the Australian ARIA Top 100 albums chart and peaked at #25. It also reached No. 19 on the ARIA digital chart and No. 7 on the Australian Artists chart.

== Track listing ==
=== Disc 1 ===
Tracks 1 and 7 are not on the original release.

1. "Sinner" - (Seeker Lover Keeper) - 4:33
2. "Fall at Your Feet" - Clare Bowditch - 3:50
3. "Stuff and Nonsense" - Missy Higgins - 3:31
4. "I'll Never Know" - Goldenhorse - 3:04
5. "Into Temptation" - Renée Geyer - 4:56
6. "Six Months in a Leaky Boat" - Little Birdy - 3:53
7. "Weather With You" - (Hollie Smith) - 5:58
8. "Better Be Home Soon" - Kasey Chambers - 3:19
9. "Distant Sun" - Brooke Fraser - 3:56
10. "Not the Girl You Think You Are" - Holly Throsby - 3:36
11. "I Hope I Never" - Lisa Miller - 4:09
12. "Don't Dream It's Over" - Sarah Blasko - 4:42
13. "One Step Ahead" - Amiel - 3:01
14. "Four Seasons" - New Buffalo - 4:00
15. "Won't Give In" - Sara Storer - 4:18
16. "Pineapple Head" - Natalie Imbruglia - 3:23
17. "Persuasion" - Stellar* - 3:41
18. "Charlie" - Sophie Koh - 3:47

=== Disc 2 ===
Tracks 7 and 11 are not on the original release.

1. "I Feel Possessed" - (Oh Mercy) – 3:15
2. "Distant Sun" - (Chris Cheney) – 3:29
3. "Fall at Your Feet" - (Boy & Bear) – 4:31
4. "Four Seasons in One Day" - (Paul Kelly & Angus Stone) – 4:18
5. "She Got Body, She Got Soul" - (Glenn Richards) – 3:02
6. "Addicted" - (Paul Dempsey) – 4:09
7. "It's Only Natural" - (Lior & Emma-Louise)
8. "Message to My Girl" (Jimmy Barnes) – 4:33
9. "I See Red" - (Art vs. Science) – 4:01
10. "I Got You" - (Philadelphia Grand Jury) – 3:12
11. "Dirty Creature - (Old Man River & Washington) - 6:47
12. "Better Be Home Soon" - (The Sleepy Jackson) – 4:35
13. "Private Universe" - (Artisan Guns) – 4:15
14. "Not Even Close" - (Darren Hayes) – 4:06
15. "Shark Attack" - (The Break with Dan Sultan) – 4:31
16. "Poor Boy" - (Perry Keyes) – 3:49
17. "Better Be Home Soon" - (Busby Marou) – 3:49
18. "Kiss the Road of Rarotonga" - (Kody Nielson) – 3:15

== Charts ==
Chart (2011)	Peak position
Australian Albums (ARIA)	31
