= Sally Seltmann =

Australian musician (born 1975)

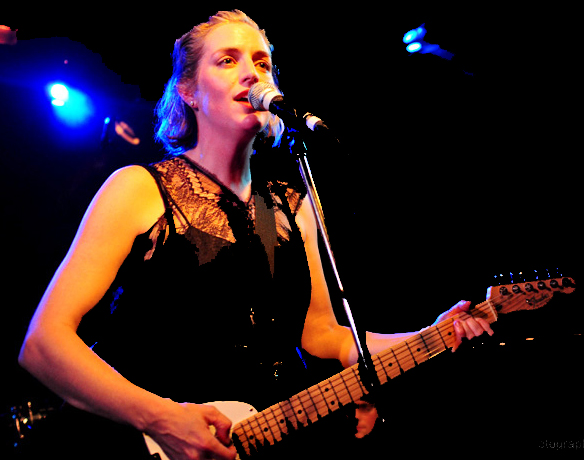
- Seltmann performing at Rosemount Hotel, Perth in July 2010

Background information
- Also known as: New Buffalo (2000–2009)
- Born: Sally Mary Russell; 11 September 1975 (age 51); Sydney, New South Wales, Australia
- Genres: Indie rock, indie pop
- Occupations: Singer-songwriter, musician, record producer, engineer, author
- Instruments: Vocals, guitar, piano, bass, keyboards, flute, percussion, accordion, drums
- Years active: 1992–present
- Labels: Arts & Crafts, Dot Dash, Lojinx
- Website: www.sallyseltmann.com

Sally Mary Seltmann (born Sally Mary Russell, 11 September 1975), is an Australian singer-songwriter, multi-instrumentalist and Record producer. From 2000 to 2009, Seltmann used the stage name, New Buffalo. Under that name, Seltmann wrote, performed, arranged and produced her debut album, The Last Beautiful Day in September 2004. Her second album, Somewhere, Anywhere appeared in March 2007. Seltmann and Canadian singer-songwriter Feist, co-wrote the song "1234" (originally "Sally's Song") which was featured in a 2007 iPod Nano commercial. It became a Top 10 hit on the United States Billboard Hot 100 for Feist. Seltmann is married to Darren Seltmann formerly of electronic music group, The Avalanches. In April 2010, Seltmann released her third solo album, Heart That's Pounding. Late that year, she formed an indie rock trio, Seeker Lover Keeper, with fellow Australians Sarah Blasko and Holly Throsby. They issued a self-titled album in June 2011, which peaked at number three on the ARIA Albums Chart. In 2013, Seltmann released her fourth solo album, Hey Daydreamer. In April 2018, Allen & Unwin published Sally Seltmann's debut novel Lovesome.

As a songwriter, Seltmann has won Australasian Performing Right Association awards for Professional Development – Pop/Dance Music in 2001 and Breakthrough Songwriter of the Year in 2008. At the ARIA Music Awards of 2007 she was nominated for Best Adult Contemporary Album for Somewhere, Anywhere.

== Biography ==
=== Early years ===
Sally Seltmann was born as Sally Mary Russell on 11 September 1975 and grew up in Sydney as the fourth of six children. As a child she had piano lessons learning classical music and later "used to love singing in little jazz ensembles, '20s and '30s style songs". One of her inspirations was listening to Marilyn Monroe's show tunes. In the early 1990s, she was the vocalist and founder of power pop group Lustre 4 alongside Lara Meyerratken on guitar. Other songwriters for Lustre 4 included Nicholas Devenish and Richard King. The band's six-track extended play, Double Happiness had "significant airplay" on national radio station, Triple J, where the group's music displayed "[s]himmering guitars and songs of young love". While still a member of Lustre 4, Seltmann briefly replaced Liz Payne on guitar in indie rock band, Spdfgh, in mid-1995. She had co-written the track, "You Made Me" with Spdfgh's Tania Bowers (aka Via Tania) for their album, Leave Me Like This (1995). Seltmann continued her work with Lustre 4 and was replaced in Spdfgh by Christina Hannaford.

In 1996, for her 21st birthday she shared a party with fellow indie singer, Ben Lee (ex-Noise Addict), who turned 18 on the same day (11 September): each had a special cake made by Meyerratken with icing as a painting of each individual. In 1997, after Lustre 4 disbanded, Seltmann moved to Melbourne where she attended an art school and worked as a photographer and waitress. In early 1999 she worked with Bowers again to compose a track for the latter's debut solo EP, Sunday. Seltmann provided backing vocals on "Electricity" for Melbourne-based electronic band, The Avalanches' 1999 single – it was later on their debut album, Since I Left You (2000).

=== New Buffalo years ===
Seltmann as New Buffalo, live in Melbourne, 2004

By 2000, Sally Seltmann had re-invented her musical style to create New Buffalo: she adopted a sound that replaced guitars with keyboards over smooth paced bass and soothing beats. In February 2000 Seltmann's debut release as New Buffalo was the track "16 Beats", which was available as an MP3 download via Ben Lee's web site. Of her musical transition, Seltmann said "I used to be in an all-girl punk band called Lustre 4. We were very, very loud... There were four of us [...] touring and having fun [...] Now I make dreamy pop songs [...] I like cutting up orchestral strings, but not plain-jane style". In 2001, Seltmann (as Sally Russell) won a Professional Development Award for 'Pop/Dance Music' from the Australasian Performing Right Association. That year she signed with Modular Recordings and released her debut five-track EP, About Last Night, featuring "16 Beats". The EP was produced by her fiance, Darren Seltmann of The Avalanches. MusicOMH's Michael Hubbard noted "[it] is a slow-paced affair of 1950s sci-fi movie effects, cut-back rhythm section ... what we end up with is something that's not quite a soundtrack, not quite a pop tune and really not quite anything". The EP was also released in the United Kingdom through Heavenly Recordings, which saw New Buffalo invited to tour throughout the UK supporting Ed Harcourt in 2001.

In 2002, Seltmann recorded tracks in Los Angeles with Jake Davies, but after Heavenly withdrew their financial support, she decided to set up her own home studio, The Lonely Studio, in Melbourne. In 2003, Sally Russell had married Darren Seltmann and they lived in suburban Yarraville. There she wrote and arranged her debut album, The Last Beautiful Day, which was released in Australia on 20 September 2004 by Dot Dash. The album features special guest appearances by Beth Orton on backing vocals and Jim White of Dirty Three on drums. However, Seltmann performed the vast majority of instrumentation on her own as well as engineering, mixing, programming and producing the work. According to The Age's reviewer, Anthony Carew, "The Last Beautiful Day is the brilliant result. Largely composed of analogue organs, scratchy samples, and layers of Seltmann's thin-yet-tender voice, it's a profound piece of personal expression, a collection of lyrical pop-songs that're a product of a single individual". On 23 August 2005 it was issued by Arts & Crafts in North America. When touring in support of the album, Seltmann sometimes performed solo and sometimes New Buffalo included other musicians, John Lee, Simon Parker and Brendan Webb.

In July 2005 a self-titled EP was released featuring two new songs – a collaboration with composer Rae Howell, and a duet with Sweden's Jens Lekman – plus re-mixes and re-worked versions of songs from the debut album. Seltmann provided a cover version of Crowded House's "Four Seasons in One Day" for a tribute album, She Will Have Her Way (2005) – it was used in the 2011 promo of the Australian soap Neighbours. In late 2005 Seltmann toured Canada supporting her label mates, Feist and Broken Social Scene.

Seltmann as New Buffalo, 2007.

On 24 March 2007, Seltmann released her second LP, Somewhere, Anywhere in Australia, and to North American audiences on 28 August 2007. Mike Mineo of Obscure Sound felt "Seltmann's style is very consistent through each and every song. Laden with a light touch of keys, her weightless vocals provide as scenery to the accompanying piano and acoustic instruments surrounding her". Also in August, Seltmann was invited by Deborah Conway to take part in the Broad Festival project, which toured major Australian cities including performing at the Sydney Opera House. With Seltmann and Conway were Anne McCue, Jade Macrae and Abbe May – they performed their own and each other's songs. In the same year, she toured as a support act for Air in Australia. She also toured in support of Paul Kelly on his Stolen Apples Tour of Australia. One of the last performances, on 20 September in Toowoomba, Queensland, was filmed and released on DVD as Live Apples: Stolen Apples Performed Live in its Entirety Plus 16 More Songs, in April 2008. The release includes Seltmann and Kelly performing a duet of a cover version of The Triffids' 1984 song, "Raining Pleasure".

Seltmann co-wrote the song "1234" (originally called "Sally's Song") with Feist, which was released on Feist's third solo album The Reminder (April 2007). The song was featured in a November 2007 iPod Nano commercial and transformed Feist's career. By proxy, Seltmann's New Buffalo project became better known as she was mentioned in a number of publications, including Entertainment Weekly, which named her as an artist to watch in September 2007.

=== Heart That's Pounding ===
In December 2009, Sally Seltmann announced the details of her third studio album, Heart That's Pounding, which was released by Arts & Crafts on 6 April 2010. The album was co-produced by Seltmann with film composer François Tétaz. It was the first album to be released under the Seltmann name, "I just felt like I was ready to go by my real name and not hide behind New Buffalo". The lead single from the album, "Harmony to My Heartbeat", was released through iTunes on 24 November 2009, and the accompanying music video directed by Antuong Nguyen of Moop Jaw followed on 15 December. In December 2009, the Seltmanns relocated to Sydney to reside.

In March 2010, Seltmann toured the US and Canada. On 14 August, Seltmann was guest programmer on rage with a playlist of over 50 songs. Also that month she formed an indie rock trio, Seeker Lover Keeper, with fellow Australians Sarah Blasko and Holly Throsby. They issued a self-titled album in June 2011, which peaked at number three on the ARIA Albums Chart. In November, Seltmann, Blasko and Throsby each provided a cover version of songs by Neil Finn and Tim Finn on the They Will Have Their Way Tour (see They Will Have Their Way) with various artists including Clare Bowditch, Lior, Paul Dempsey and Alexander Gow (of Oh Mercy) also appearing. Seltmann accompanied herself on a piano for her rendition of "Four Seasons in One Day", later Seeker Lover Keeper performed "Sinner" from Neil's 1998 album Try Whistling This. In March 2012, Seltmann supported an Australian tour by Bon Iver.

=== Hey Daydreamer to The Letdown ===
Seltmann issued her fourth album (second under her own name), Hey Daydreamer, via Arts & Crafts in March 2013. The Seltmanns had relocated to Los Angeles, after it was mostly written locally, she explained, "I wrote most of the songs for Hey Daydreamer in Sydney, but writing in LA feels GOOD! There's a lot of creative energy in the air in that city, which is one of the reasons why I live there now! A lot of positive energy, and a lot of writers and interesting people with ideas and courage." The album was recorded and co-produced with Darren.

AllMusic's James Christopher Monger observed, "[she] is first and foremost a confessional singer/songwriter, though one with a flair for pop artistry, and less fussy tracks like the lovely and heartfelt "The Small Hotel," the bouncy, bucolic "Holly Drive," and the stoic and superb closer 'States and Spaces"' drive that point home." In April 2014 she undertook an Australian east coast tour promoting the album's local release in the previous month. It reached the ARIA Albums Chart top 100.

At the APRA Music Awards of 2016 Seltmann and Darren won Best Original Song Composed for the Screen for "Dancing in the Darkness", which was used in The Letdown on ABC-TV. The couple had been approached by the comedy show's creator Sarah Scheller, "We knew that the show had some hilarious moments, but also some introspective moments where the main character feels isolated and is struggling with the changes of being a new mum. "Dancing in the Darkness" was used in one of these more sensitive scenes, and we felt so happy with how the music worked with the visuals and performances."

=== Lovesome ===
In April 2018, Allen & Unwin published Seltmann's debut novel Lovesome. Set in 1995 in Sydney's Balmain, Lovesome tells the story of twenty one year old artist and waitress Joni Johnson, and her search for love. Librarian's Choice included Lovesome in their Top 10 Books We Love of May 2018, and Seltmann appeared at The Melbourne Writers Festival, Brisbane Writers Festival and Perth Writers Week.

== Personal life ==
In 2003, Sally Russell married Darren Seltmann, of The Avalanches. In late 2008, the couple had a daughter. As of December 2009, the family resides in Sydney.

Her older brother, Luke Russell, is a philosophy lecturer at Sydney University, where he completed his PhD, in 2002. Luke also has a side career in pop rock; in 2007, he issued his debut album, Kiss That Lasted All Weekend, on Half A Cow Records.

== Credits ==
According to Allmusic, Seltmann is credited with: vocals, harmony vocals, guitar, bass guitar, piano, keyboards, flute (wood), organ, percussion, accordion, drums, Roland 2000, programming, producer, engineer, composer, mixing.

== Discography ==
=== Albums ===
List of albums, with selected chart positions
Title	Details	Peak chart positions
Title	Details	AUS
As New Buffalo
The Last Beautiful Day	Released: 2004; Label: Dot Dash (DASH002CD); Formats: CD, Digital	—
Somewhere, Anywhere	Released: March 2007; Label: Dot Dash (DASH007CD); Formats: CD, Digital	80
As Sally Seltmann
Heart That's Pounding	Released: April 2010; Label: Arts & Crafts/Shock (SS007); Formats: CD, LP, Digital	73
Hey Daydreamer	Released: 2014; Label: Arts & Crafts/Shock (SS008); Formats: CD, LP, Digital	—
Early Moon	Released: 2022; Label: Arts & Crafts/Three of Hearts; Formats: LP, Digital	—

=== Extended plays ===
List of EPs, with selected chart positions
Title	Details	Peak chart positions
Title	Details	AUS
As New Buffalo
About Last Night	Released: 2001; Label: The Seltmanns (SELT001); Formats: CD, Digital	—
New Buffalo	Released: 2005; Label: Dot Dash (DASH004CD); Formats: CD, Digital	—

=== See also ===
- Seeker Lover Keeper

=== Compilation appearances ===
- She Will Have Her Way – "Four Seasons" (2005)
- Like a Version 2 – "Don't Let Me Be Misunderstood" (2006)
- We Died, They Remixed – "The Cemetery" (Cemetery Sass Emerary Mix) (28 October 2006)
- Write Your Adventures Down – "No Reason to Cry" (2007)
- Live Apples – "Raining Pleasure" duet with Paul Kelly (April 2008)
- Like a Version 7 – "You're So Vain" (2011)
- They Will Have Their Way – "Four Seasons" by Seltmann, "Sinner" by Seeker Lover Keeper (October 2011)
- RocKwiz – The Christmas Album – "Hey Guys! It's Christmas Time" duet with Dan Kelly (25 November 2011)
- She Loves You Too by Various Artists (14 December 2014) – "Hypnotised"

== Awards and nominations ==
=== AMP Award ===
The Australian Music Prize (AMP) is presented annually from 2005 and is sponsored by the Phonographic Performance Company of Australia (PPCA).

Year	Nominee / work	Award	Result
2007	Somewhere, Anywhere – New Buffalo	Australian Music Prize	Nominated
2010	Heart That's Pounding – Sally Seltmann	Australian Music Prize	Nominated

=== APRA Awards ===
The APRA Awards are presented annually from 1982 by the Australasian Performing Right Association (APRA), "honouring composers and songwriters".

Year	Nominee / work	Award	Result
2001	Sally Russell	Professional Development Awards – Pop/Dance Music	Won
2008	Sally Seltmann	Breakthrough Songwriter of the Year	Won
2008	"1234" – Feist (Sally Seltmann, Leslie Feist)	Song of the Year	Nominated

=== ARIA Awards ===
The ARIA Music Awards are presented annually from 1987 by the Australian Recording Industry Association (ARIA).

Year	Nominee / work	Award	Result
2007	Somewhere, Anywhere – New Buffalo	Best Adult Contemporary Album	Nominated
2019	Wild Seeds (as part of Seeker Lover Keeper)	Best Adult Contemporary Album	Nominated
2020	The Letdown (Music from Seasons 1+2) (with Darren Seltmann)	Best Original Soundtrack, Cast or Show Album	Nominated
