= 2011 ARIA Music Awards =

Annual Australian music awards

- Date: 27 November 2011
- Venue: Allphones Arena, Sydney, New South Wales

Highlights
- Most wins: Gotye (6)
- Most nominations: Drapht (7); Gotye (7)
- Website: ariaawards.com.au

Television/radio coverage
- Network: Nine Network

The 25th Annual Australian Recording Industry Association Music Awards (generally known as the ARIA Music Awards or simply the ARIAs) were a series of award ceremonies which included the 2011 ARIA Artisan Awards, ARIA Hall of Fame Awards, ARIA Fine Arts Awards and ARIA Awards. The latter ceremony took place on 27 November at the Allphones Arena, Sydney, and was telecast Nine Network's channel Go! at 7:30pm. The final nominees for ARIA Award categories were announced on 11 October as well as nominees and winners for Fine Arts Awards and Artisan Awards.

For the second time in ARIA Awards history, public votes were used for the categories, "Most Popular International Artist" and "Most Popular Australian Artist"; and for the first time for a new category "Most Popular Australian Live Artist".

The ARIA Hall of Fame inducted Kylie Minogue and The Wiggles – including former member Greg Page – on 27 November at the same ceremony as the ARIA Awards.

2011 ARIA Hall of Fame inductees
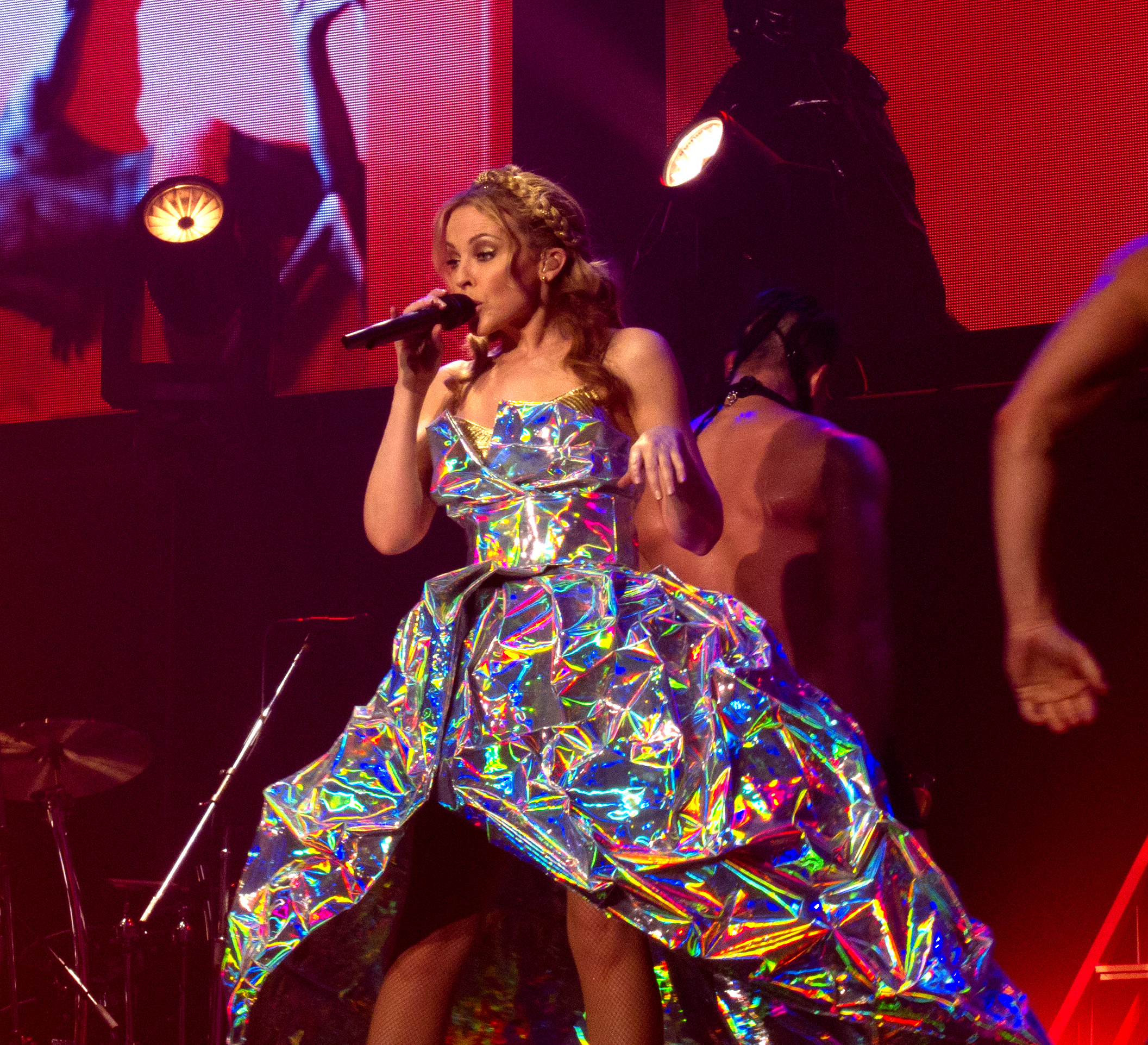
Kylie Minogue
Photo from April 2011 performance in Japan.

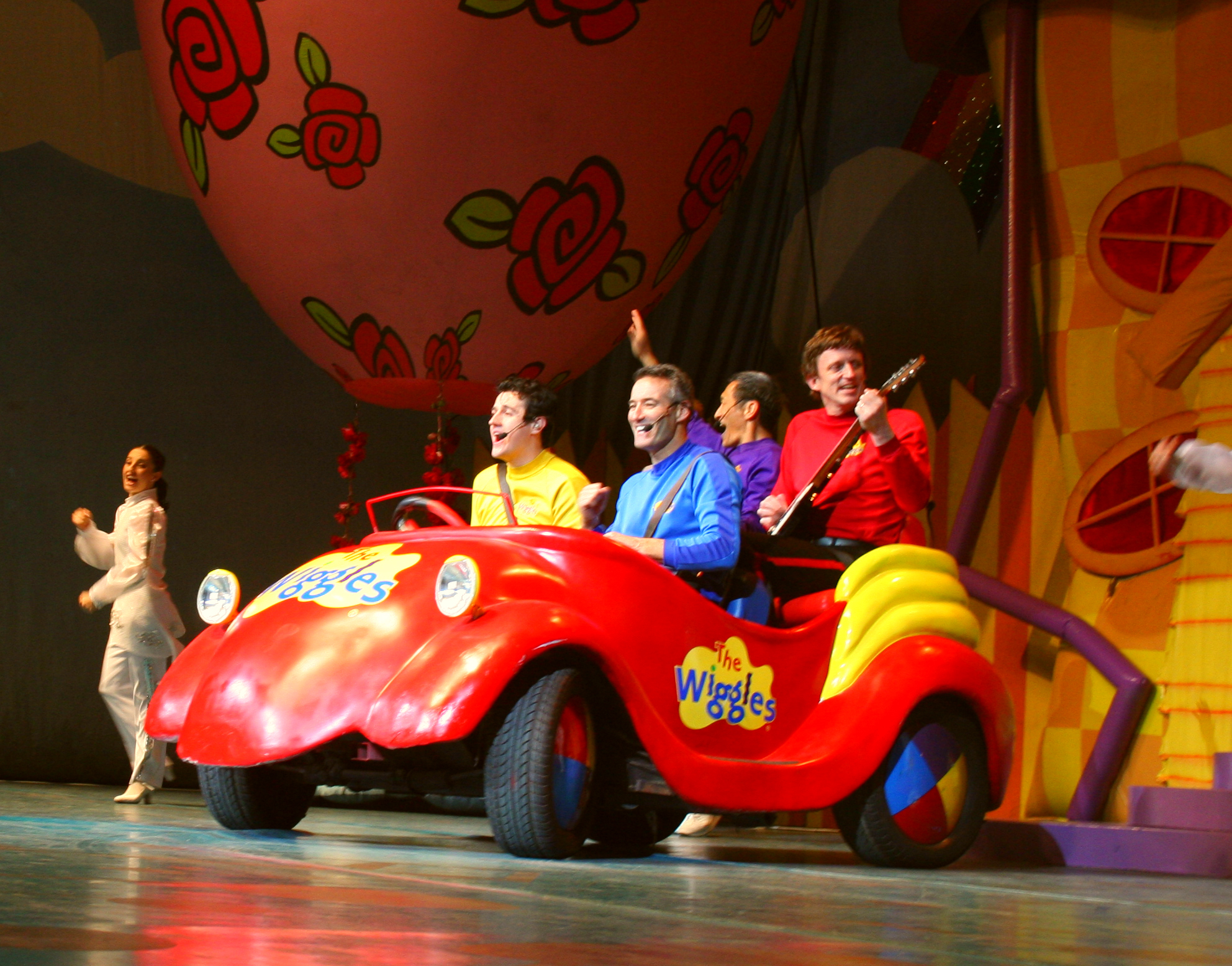
The Wiggles
Photo from 2007 performance in The United States

== Presenters and performers ==
=== Presenters ===
- Adam Hills presented the awards for "Breakthrough Artist – Single" and "Breakthrough Artist – Album".
- Tom Ballard and Alex Dyson presented the award for "Best Independent Release".
- Hamish & Andy presented the awards for "Best Urban Album", "Best Dance Release" and "Best Country Album".
- Benji Madden and Joel Madden presented the awards for "Best Rock Album" and "Best Comedy Release".
- Katie Noonan and Iva Davies presented the award for "Best Pop Release".
- Stevie Nicks and Richard Wilkins presented the award for "Best Adult Contemporary Album".
- Ricki-Lee Coulter and James Kerley presented the awards for "Most Popular Australian Artist", "Most Popular International Artist" and "Most Popular Australian Live Artist".
- Noah Taylor and Christina Amphlett presented the award for "Best Group".
- Delta Goodrem presented the awards for "Best Male Artist" and "Best Female Artist".
- Missy Higgins presented the awards for "Single of the Year" and "Album of the Year".
- Molly Meldrum and Prime Minister Julia Gillard inducted Kylie Minogue into the Hall of Fame.
- David Wenham inducted The Wiggles into the Hall of Fame.
- James Mathison
- Erin McNaught
- Ruby Rose

=== Performers ===
- Drapht performed his song "Rapunzel".
- Cut Copy performed their song "Need You Now".
- Art vs. Science performed their song "Magic Fountain".
- Guy Sebastian sang a medley of "Who's That Girl" and "Don't Worry Be Happy".
- Geoffrey Gurrumul Yunupingu performed his song, "Warwu", accompanied by Missy Higgins on piano.
  - In 2019 Double J's Dan Condon described this as one of "7 great performances from the history of the ARIA Awards."
- Gotye and Kimbra performed their award-winning single "Somebody That I Used to Know".
- The Living End sang "The Ending Is Just the Beginning Repeating", the lead single from their album.
- Delta Goodrem performed a cover version of Wendy Matthews' "The Day You Went Away", in tribute to those we've lost from the Australian Music Industry in the past 25 years.
- Boy & Bear performed their award-winning single "Feeding Line".

== ARIA Hall of Fame Inductees ==
The ARIA Hall of Fame induction occurred on 27 November 2011 as part of the overall ARIA Music Awards. Molly Meldrum introduced Prime Minister of Australia, Julia Gillard, who inducted Kylie Minogue; while actor, David Wenham, inducted The Wiggles – including former member Greg Page.

== Nominees and winners ==
=== ARIA Awards ===
Winners are listed first and highlighted in boldface.

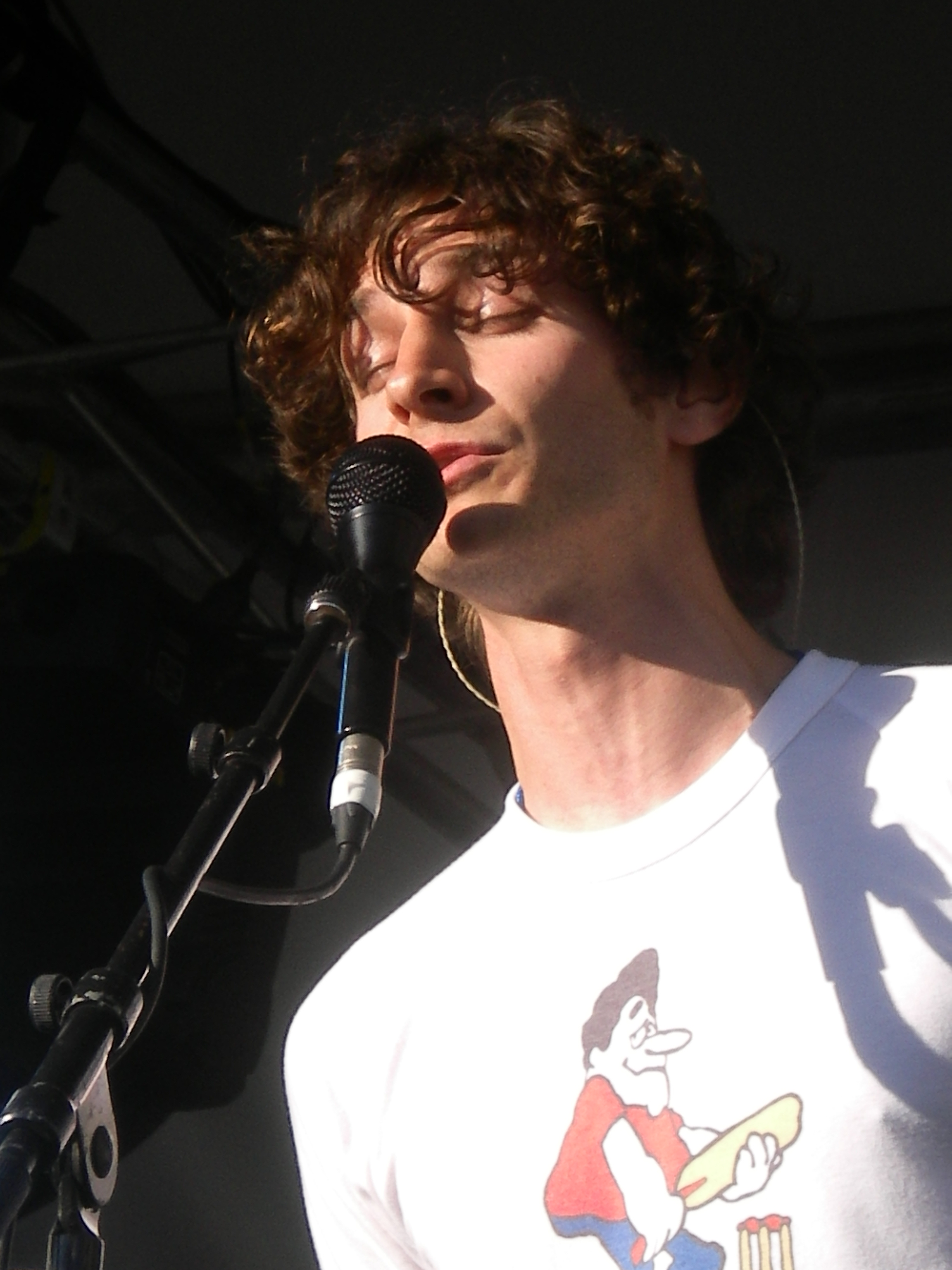
Gotye won six awards.

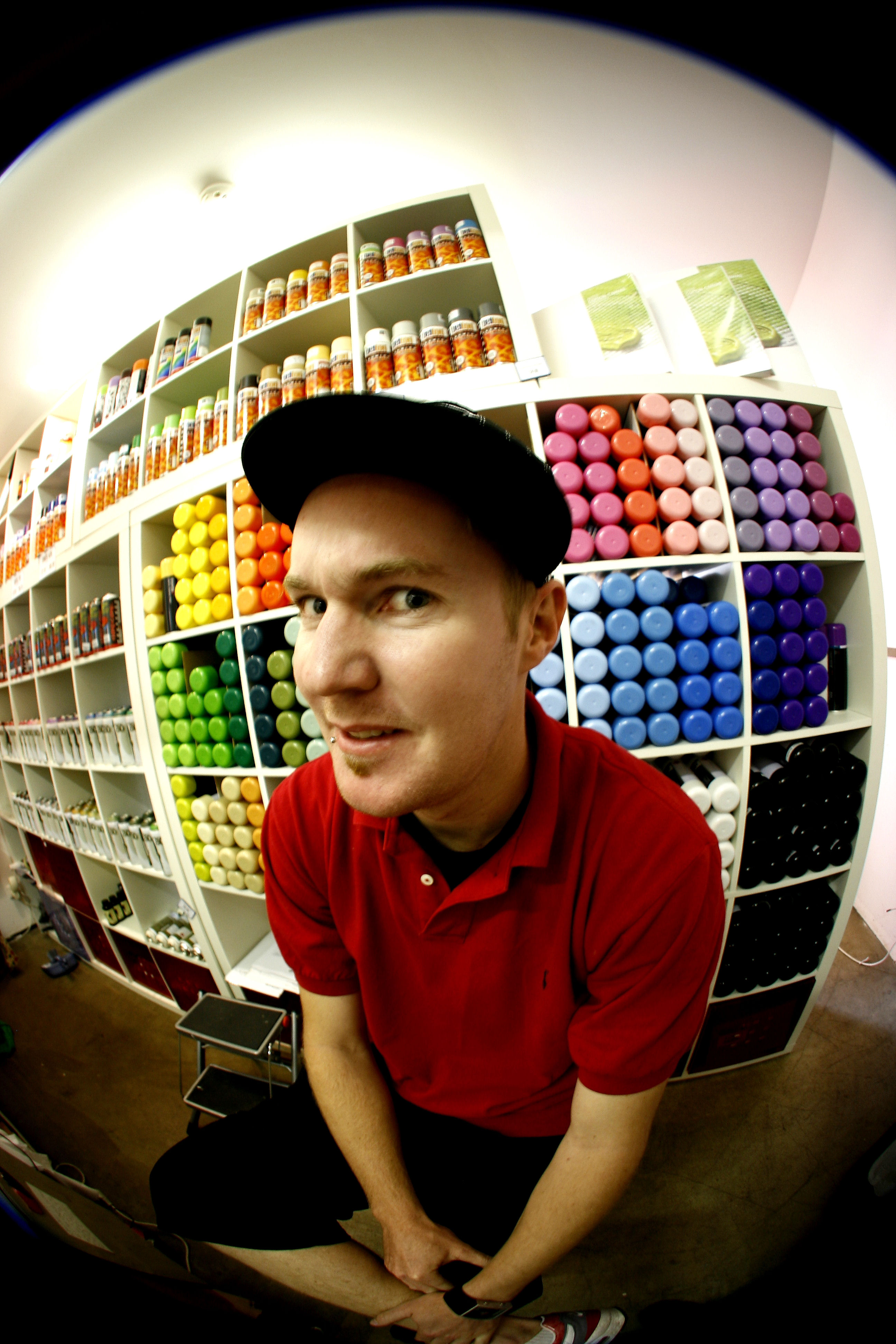
Drapht received seven nominations.

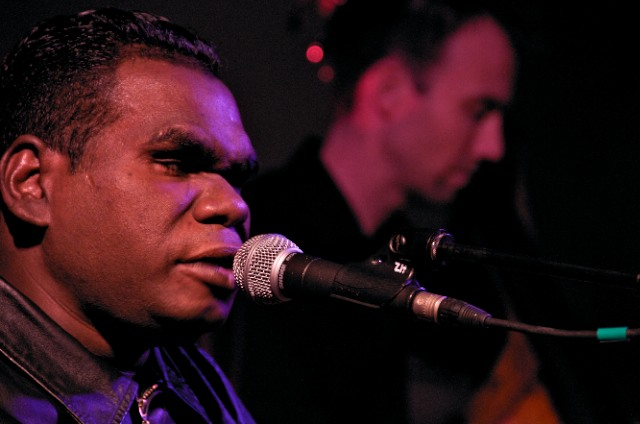
Geoffrey Gurrumul Yunupingu received six nominations.

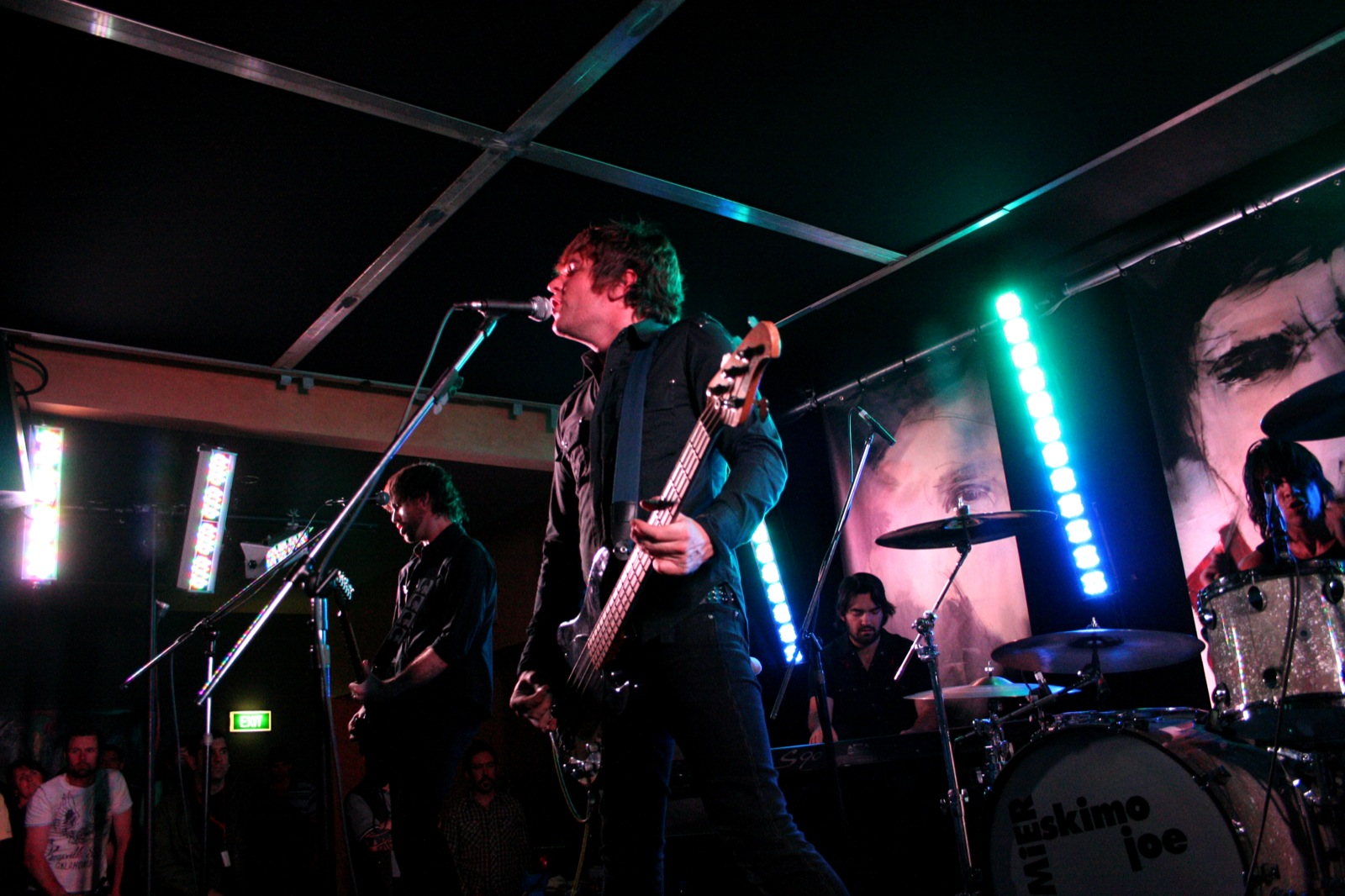
Eskimo Joe received six nominations.

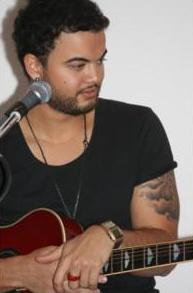
Guy Sebastian received four nominations.

Album of the Year	Single of the Year
**Boy & Bear – Moonfire**; Cut Copy – Zonoscope; Eskimo Joe – Ghosts of the Past; Geoffrey Gurrumul Yunupingu – Rrakala; Grinderman – Grinderman 2	**Gotye featuring Kimbra – "Somebody That I Used to Know"**; Birds of Tokyo – "Wild at Heart"; Boy & Bear – "Feeding Line"; Drapht – "Rapunzel"; Guy Sebastian featuring Eve – "Who's That Girl"; The Jezabels – "Dark Storm"
Best Male Artist	Best Female Artist
**Gotye – "Somebody That I Used to Know"**; Drapht – The Life of Riley; Gareth Liddiard – Strange Tourist; Geoffrey Gurrumul Yunupingu – Rrakala; Josh Pyke – "No One Wants a Lover"	**Kimbra – "Cameo Lover"**; Adalita – Adalita; Clare Bowditch – Are You Ready Yet?; Kasey Chambers – Little Bird; Washington – "Holy Moses"
Breakthrough Artist – Album (Note: Four old categories were returned, "Breakthrough Artist – Single" and "Breakthrough Artist – Album" (replacing "Breakthrough Artist"), "Highest Selling Album" and "Highest Selling Single" (replacing the popularly voted "Most Popular Australian Album" and "Most Popular Australian Single" respectively). As of December 2013, the ARIA website does not display entries for Highest Selling Album or Highest Selling Single for 2011. Nominees according to Take 40 Australia, winners according to PagesDigital: Take 40 Australia: "2011 ARIA Nominations Announced – Full List Here!". Take 40 Australia (MCM Entertainment). 12 October 2011. Archived from the original on 15 October 2011.; PagesDigital: Digges, Mariam (28 November 2011). "ARIA Awards 2011 – The Winners". PagesDigital.)	Breakthrough Artist – Single
**Boy & Bear – Moonfire**; Drapht – The Life of Riley; Gypsy & The Cat – Gilgamesh; Oh Mercy – Great Barrier Grief; The Middle East – I Want That You Are Always Happy	**Boy & Bear – "Feeding Line"**; Drapht – "Rapunzel"; Havana Brown – "We Run the Night"; The Jezabels – "Dark Storm"; Zoë Badwi – "Freefallin"
Highest Selling Album	Highest Selling Single
**Altiyan Childs – Altiyan Childs**; Angus & Julia Stone – Down the Way; Birds of Tokyo – Birds of Tokyo; Keith Urban – Get Closer; Various – He Will Have His Way	**Guy Sebastian featuring Eve – "Who's That Girl"**; Birds of Tokyo – "Plans"; Gotye featuring Kimbra – "Somebody That I Used to Know"; Havana Brown – "We Run the Night"; Jessica Mauboy featuring Ludacris – "Saturday Night"
Best Group	Best Independent Release
**Boy & Bear – Moonfire**; Birds of Tokyo – "Wild at Heart"; Eskimo Joe – Ghosts of the Past; Grinderman – Grinderman 2; The Living End – The Ending Is Just the Beginning Repeating	**Art vs. Science – The Experiment**; Geoffrey Gurrumul Yunupingu – Rrakala; John Butler Trio – Live at Red Rocks; Tex Perkins & the Dark Horses – Tex Perkins & the Dark Horses; The Jezabels – Dark Storm
Best Children's Album	Best Comedy Release
**The Wiggles – Ukulele Baby**; dirtgirlworld – Dig It; Hi-5 – Turn the Music Up!; Holly Throsby – See!; Play School – Let's Play Together	**Hamish & Andy – Celebrating 50 Glorious Years**; Adam Hills – Inflatable; Buddy Goode – The One & Only Buddy Goode; Josh Thomas – Josh Thomas Surprise Warehouse Comedy Festival; Tim Minchin – Tim Minchin & the Heritage Orchestra
Best Dance Release	Best Pop Release
**Cut Copy – Zonoscope**; Bag Raiders – Bag Raiders; Miami Horror – Illumination; Pnau – Soft Universe; The Potbelleez – "From the Music"	**Gotye featuring Kimbra – "Somebody That I Used to Know"**; Architecture in Helsinki – Moment Bends; Guy Sebastian featuring Eve – "Who's That Girl?"; Gypsy & the Cat – Gilgamesh; Washington –"Holy Moses"
Best Adult Alternative Album	Best Adult Contemporary Album
**Boy & Bear – Moonfire**; Grinderman – Grinderman 2; Little Red – Midnight Remember; Seeker Lover Keeper – Seeker Lover Keeper; The Panics – Rain on the Humming Wire	**Billy Thorpe – Tangier**; Colin Hay – Gathering Mercury; Damien Leith – Roy; John Farnham – Jack; Mark Seymour & the Undertow – Undertow
Best Blues & Roots Album	Best Urban Album
**The Audreys – Sometimes the Stars**; Backsliders – Starvation Box; Blue King Brown – Worldwize Part 1 – North & South; John Butler Trio – Live at Red Rocks; The Waifs – Temptation	**Drapht – The Life of Riley**; Illy – The Chase; Koolism – The 'Umu; Phrase – Babylon; Vents – Marked for Death
Best Hard Rock/Heavy Metal Album	Best Rock Album
**Front End Loader – Ritardando**; Coerce – Ethereal Surrogate Saviour; Cosmic Psychos – Glorius Barsteds; Dream On, Dreamer – Heartbound; Floating Me – Floating Me	**The Living End – The Ending Is Just the Beginning Repeating**; Children Collide – Theory of Everything; Eskimo Joe – Ghosts of the Past; Jebediah – Kosciuszko; Papa Vs Pretty – United in Isolation
Best Country Album	Most Popular Australian Live Artist (Note: For the second time in ARIA Awards history, the public voted in the categories for both "Most Popular International Artist" and "Most Popular Australian Artist". A new public voted category, "Most Popular Australian Live Artist" was introduced.)
**Kasey Chambers – Little Bird**; Jasmine Rae – Listen Here; Keith Urban – Get Closer; Shane Nicholson – Bad Machines; Troy Cassar-Daley – Troy Cassar-Daley Live	**The Living End**; Birds of Tokyo; Justice Crew; Keith Urban; Shannon Noll
Most Popular International Artist	Most Popular Australian Artist
**P!nk**; Adele; Chris Brown; Jennifer Lopez; Jessie J; Ke$ha; Lady Gaga; LMFAO; Pitbull; Rihanna	**Birds of Tokyo**; Altiyan Childs; Angus & Julia Stone; Drapht; Guy Sebastian; Jessica Mauboy; John Farnham; Justice Crew; Keith Urban; Stan Walker

=== Fine Arts Awards ===
Winners are listed first and highlighted in boldface. (Note: Best Music DVD category was moved to Fine Arts Awards from ARIA Awards section. Final nominees and winners were announced on 11 October 2011.)

Best Classical Album
- **Sally Whitwell – Mad Rush: Piano Music of Philip Glass**
  - Karin Schaupp & Flinders Quartet – Fandango
  - Latitude 37 – Latitude 37
  - Richard Tognetti (violin), Australian Chamber Orchestra – Mozart Violin Concertos Vol 2
  - Teddy Tahu Rhodes – Serious Songs
Best Jazz Album
- **Elixir featuring Katie Noonan – First Seed Ripening**
  - Allan Browne, Marc Hannaford, Sam Anning – Shreveport Stomp
  - Kristin Berardi and The Jazzgroove Mothership Orchestra – Kristin Berardi meets The Jazzgroove Mothership Orchestra
  - Sarah McKenzie – Don't Tempt Me
  - The Idea of North – Extraordinary Tale
Best Original Soundtrack/Cast/Show Album
- **Chris Lilley – Angry Boys – Official Soundtrack Album**
  - Jed Kurzel – Snowtown
  - Stephen Pigram, Alan Pigram, Alex Lloyd – Mad Bastards – Music from the Motion Picture
  - Sydney Symphony & cast, Alexander Briger (conductor) – Don John of Austria
  - Various Artists – Mary Poppins Australian Cast Recording
Best World Music Album
- **Geoffrey Gurrumul Yunupingu – Rrakala**
  - David Bridie, Hein Arumisore, Jacob Rumbiak, Ronny Kareni, Donny Roem – Strange Birds in Paradise: A West Papuan Soundtrack
  - Saltwater Band – Malk
  - The Shaolin Afronauts – Flight of the Ancients
  - Slava & Leonard Grigoryan, James & Joseph Tawadros – Band of Brothers
Best Music DVD
- **AC/DC – Live at River Plate**
  - Powderfinger – Sunsets Farewell Tour
  - RocKwiz – Live National Tour
  - Tex Perkins – The Man in Black
  - Various Artists –Triple J's One Night Stand

=== Artisan Awards ===
Winners are listed first and highlighted in boldface. (Note: The winners and nominees of the Artisan Awards were announced on 11 October 2011.)

Best Cover Art	Best Video
**Alter** – **Cut Copy** – **Zonoscope**; Aaron Hayward, David Homer, Debaser – Art vs. Science – The Experiment; Carlo Santone – Geoffry Gurumul Yunupingu – Rrakala; David Homer, Aaron Hayward, Debaser – Billy Thorpe – Billy Thorpe's Tangier; Ken Done – Oh Mercy – Great Barrier Grief	**Natasha Pincus** – **Gotye** featuring **Kimbra** – "**Somebody That I Used to Know**"; Bart Borghesi – Eskimo Joe – "Love Is a Drug"; Carlo Santone – Geoffrey Gurrumul Yunupingu – "Gopuru"; David Michod, Flood Projects – Children Collide – "Loveless"; Guy Franklin – Kimbra – "Cameo Lover"
Engineer of the Year	Producer of the Year
**François Tétaz** – **Gotye** featuring **Kimbra** – "**Somebody That I Used to Know**"; Dave Parkin – Drapht – "Rapunzel"; Greg Clarke – Billy Thorpe – Tangier; Matt Lovell – Eskimo Joe – Ghosts of the Past; Wayne Connolly – Josh Pyke – "No One Wants a Lover"	**Wally De Backer**– **Gotye** featuring **Kimbra** – "**Somebody That I Used to Know**"; Boy & Bear – Boy & Bear – Moonfire; Daniel Denholm – – Billy Thorpe Tangier; Eskimo Joe – Eskimo Joe – Ghosts of the Past; Wayne Connolly, Josh Pyke – Josh Pyke – "No One Wants a Lover"

== See also ==
- Music of Australia
