= Seeker Lover Keeper =

Australian indie rock music group

- Origin: Australia
- Genres: Folk, indie pop, indie rock
- Years active: 2010–2011, 2018–2020, 2022
- Labels: Dew Process, Liberation Music
- Past members: Sarah Blasko; Sally Seltmann; Holly Throsby
- Website: seekerloverkeeper.co

Seeker Lover Keeper was an Australian indie rock music supergroup formed by Sarah Blasko, Sally Seltmann and Holly Throsby in August 2010. The trio each have separate solo careers as singer-songwriters. The group's first album, which was self-titled, was released on 3 June 2011 through Dew Process/UMA.

On 12 June 2011, the album debuted at No. 3 on the ARIA Albums Chart and has been certified platinum. The album was a surprise success, peaking higher than any former release from Blasko, Seltmann or Throsby. At the ARIA Music Awards of 2011, Seeker Lover Keeper was nominated for 'Best Adult Alternative Album'.

Seeker Lover Keeper also scored two songs in Triple J Hottest 100 of 2011: "Light All My Lights" came in at #86, and "Even Though I'm a Woman" came in at #17.

== Biography ==
In August 2010, Seeker Lover Keeper was formed by Australian solo artists Sarah Blasko, Sally Seltmann and Holly Throsby. Each has a separate solo career as a singer-songwriter. They recorded material in New York and issued the self-titled album on 3 June 2011, which peaked at number three on the ARIA Albums Chart. The group issued three singles, each with an accompanying music video, that featured each individual as the lead singer, "Light All My Lights" (Blasko), "Even Though I'm a Woman" (Throsby) and "On My Own" (Seltmann). The video for "Light All My Lights" starred Australian actor Barry Otto, while "On My Own" starred John Waters and "Even Though I'm a Woman" starred Aden Young.

Seeker Lover Keeper undertook two major tours in support of the album. The first was undertaken across July and August 2011; and featured Dirty Three's Jim White on drums and David Symes (now of Boy & Bear) on bass. Support on the tour came from Youth Group's Toby Martin. The second tour was from late November into early December, primarily undertaken in churches and cathedrals as a part of the Heavenly Sounds tour. Although Symes returned for this tour, White was replaced by drummer and percussionist Bree van Reyk; Throsby's then-partner who also co-wrote the Seeker Lover Keeper song "Rely on Me". The tour concluded with an appearance at the Homebake music festival in Sydney.

In November, Seltmann, Blasko and Throsby each provided a cover version of songs by Neil Finn and Tim Finn on the They Will Have Their Way Tour (see They Will Have Their Way) with various artists including Clare Bowditch, Lior, Paul Dempsey and Alexander Gow (of Oh Mercy) also appearing. Seltmann accompanied herself on a piano for her rendition of "Four Seasons in One Day", later Seeker Lover Keeper performed "Sinner" from Neil's 1998 album Try Whistling This. By year's end, each had returned to their respective solo careers.

In 2016, Blasko was the artist in residence on Double J digital radio. With Seltmann and Throsby as guests on one of her sessions, Blasko floated the idea of making a second Seeker Lover Keeper record. Both Seltmann and Throsby agreed, and later confirmed that they were writing toward a new record.

In October 2018, the three performed together at St. Stephen's Uniting Church in Newtown. After each performing solo sets, they reconvened on stage as Seeker Lover Keeper for the first time in nearly seven years. In November 2018, Seltmann posted to Instagram that the group had been working on the second Seeker Lover Keeper album.

On 24 May 2019, the group released their first new song in eight years, "Let It Out". The music video stars Australian actress Magda Szubanski. The group also announced headlining shows in Sydney and Melbourne for July, both of which subsequently sold out. In June 2019, the group released a second single, "Wild Seeds". The group also announced their second studio album, also entitled Wild Seeds, which was released on 9 August 2019 via Liberation Music. The music video for "Wild Seeds" stars Orange Is the New Black actress Yael Stone and the video for "Superstar" features Australian actress Madeleine Madden.

In September 2019, the band commenced a 15-date Australian tour. It began in Springwood, New South Wales on 5 September and ended in Belgrave, Victoria on 20 October.

Following a final run of shows in March 2020, Seeker Lover Keeper entered another hiatus. Blasko released an anniversary reissue of her album As Day Follows Night and toured in support of it, while Seltmann released a new solo album entitled Early Moon and Throsby released her third novel, Clarke. In 2022, the group were announced on the line-up for Queenscliff Music Festival, and announced shows in both Sydney and Castlemaine around the festival appearance in November 2022.

== Members ==
- Holly Throsby – vocals, guitar, piano, keyboards (2010–2011, 2018–2020, 2022)
- Sarah Blasko – vocals, piano, keyboards (2010–2011, 2018–2020, 2022), percussion (2018–2020, 2022), guitar (2010–2011)
- Sally Seltmann – vocals, piano, keyboards (2010–2011, 2018–2020, 2022), guitar (2010–2011)

Auxiliary musicians

- Jim White – drums, percussion (2010–2011)
- Bree van Reyk – drums (2011)
- David Symes – bass (2010–2011, 2018–2019, 2022), keyboards (2018–2019, 2022)
- James Haselwood – bass, keyboards (2019–2020)
- Laurence Pike – drums, percussion (2018–2020, 2022)

== Discography ==
=== Albums ===
List of albums, with selected chart positions and certifications
| Title | Details | Peak chart positions | Certifications |
| Title | Details | AUS | Certifications |
|---|---|---|---|
| Seeker Lover Keeper | Released: 3 June 2011; Label: Dew Process; Formats: CD, digital download | 3 | ARIA: Platinum |
| Wild Seeds | Released: 9 August 2019; Label: Liberation; Formats: CD, vinyl, streaming | 14 | |

=== Singles ===
List of singles, with selected chart positions
| Year | Title | Peak chart positions | Album |
| Year | Title | AUS | Album |
|---|---|---|---|
| 2011 | "Light All My Lights" | — | Seeker Lover Keeper |
| 2011 | "Even Though I'm a Woman" | 80 | Seeker Lover Keeper |
| 2011 | "On My Own" | — | Seeker Lover Keeper |
| 2019 | "Let It Out" | — | Wild Seeds |
| 2019 | "Wild Seeds" | — | Wild Seeds |
| 2019 | "Superstar" | — | Wild Seeds |
| 2019 | "One Way Or Another" | — | Wild Seeds |
"—" denotes releases that failed to chart.

== Awards ==
=== ARIA Music Awards ===
The ARIA Music Awards is an annual awards ceremony that recognises excellence, innovation, and achievement across all genres of Australian music. Seeker Lover Seeker have been nominated for two awards.

| Year | Nominee / work | Award | Result |
|---|---|---|---|
| 2011 | Seeker Lover Keeper | Best Adult Alternative album | Nominated |
| 2019 | Wild Seeds | Best Adult Contemporary Album | Nominated |
