= ARIA Award for Best Cover Art =

Annual Australian music industry award

- Country: Australia
- Presented by: Australian Recording Industry Association (ARIA)
- First award: 1987
- Currently held by: Ecca Vandal, Kathryn Vinella and Sean McDonald for Looking for People to Unfollow by Ecca Vandal (2026)
- Website: ariaawards.com.au

The ARIA Music Award for Best Cover Art, is an award presented within the Artisan Awards at the annual ARIA Music Awards. The ARIA Awards recognise "the many achievements of Aussie artists across all music genres", and have been given by the Australian Recording Industry Association (ARIA) since 1987.

The award is given to the designer who is from, or resides in Australia, and has overall responsibility for the album covers' design concept. The graphics that appear on the cover must be an original work that was designed in Australia. The accolade is restricted to album recordings that have met the general eligibility criteria (however, in 2000 and 2012 single covers were included in the final nominations list). Best Cover Art is voted for by a judging academy, which consists of 1000 members from different areas of the music industry.

== Winners and nominees ==
In the following table, the winner is highlighted in a separate colour, and in boldface; the nominees are those that are not highlighted or in boldface. Nominees from 1988 are not available in published sources.

The years listed in the first column relate to the year and edition of the awards ceremony. The second column indicates the graphic artist(s) responsible for the covers' design (although the current rules (as of 2011) state that only the graphic designer who has had overall responsibility for the album covers' design concept may be eligible for nomination, multiple artists have been nominated in previous ceremonies). The "Album title and original recording artist(s)" column names the album whose cover art has been nominated, and its original recording artist; the musician is not the nominee unless they were the designer.

Winner marked in a separate colour

Year	Cover artist(s)	Album title and original recording artist(s)
**1987** (1st)
**1987** (1st)	**Oleh Witer**	**Big Pig** by **Big Pig**
**1987** (1st)	Art Scarff	The Final Wave by Australian Crawl
**1987** (1st)	Buster Stiggs	Love an Adventure by Pseudo Echo
**1987** (1st)	Nick Seymour	Crowded House by Crowded House
**1987** (1st)	Richard Alan	Models' Media by Models
**1987** (1st)	Richard Alan	Bear Witness by I'm Talking
**1987** (1st)	Steve Malpass	Whispering Jack by John Farnham
**1988** (2nd)	**Ken Duncan, Creative Type Wart, Gary Morris** and **Midnight Oil**	**Diesel and Dust** by **Midnight Oil**
**1989** (3rd)
**1989** (3rd)	**Nick Seymour**	**Temple of Low Men** by **Crowded House**
**1989** (3rd)	The Add Agency	Up from Down Under by Tommy Emmanuel
**1989** (3rd)	Bruce Goold	Wild Desert Rose by Coloured Stone
**1989** (3rd)	Phil Judd	The Sound of Trees by Schnell Fenster
**1989** (3rd)	Malpass & Burrows	Age of Reason by John Farnham
**1989** (3rd)	Robyn Stacey & Richard Allan	Lost by Died Pretty
**1989** (3rd)	Eric Weideman	...ish by 1927
**1990** (4th)
**1990** (4th)	**Rob Miles**	**Ghost Nation** by **Hunters & Collectors**
**1990** (4th)	Greg O'Connor	These Here Are Crazy Times by Boom Crash Opera
**1990** (4th)	Martin Fabinyi	Brave by Kate Ceberano
**1990** (4th)	Deborah Parry Graphics / Ben Evans	0–9 Series by Various Artists
**1990** (4th)	Stephen Thomas	The Big Don't Argue by Weddings Parties Anything
**1991** (5th)
**1991** (5th)	**Livingstone Clarke** and **Midnight Oil**	**Blue Sky Mining** by **Midnight Oil**
**1991** (5th)	Timothy Eames	Collected Works by Hunters & Collectors
**1991** (5th)	Iva Davies and David Barnes	Code Blue by Icehouse
**1991** (5th)	Jon Quinn	Chain Reaction by John Farnham
**1991** (5th)	Capitol Art / Peter Blakeley	Harry's Café De Wheels by Peter Blakeley
**1992** (6th)
**1992** (6th)	**Louise Beach / Mushroom Art**	**Tribal Voice** by **Yothu Yindi**
**1992** (6th)	Pierre Baroni / Mushroom Art	Soul Deep by Jimmy Barnes
**1992** (6th)	Pierre Baroni / Mushroom Art	String of Pearls by Deborah Conway
**1992** (6th)	Richard Pleasance and Ross Hipwell	Galleon by Richard Pleasance
**1992** (6th)	Tommy Steele and Nick Seymour	Woodface by Crowded House
**1993** (7th)
**1993** (7th)	**Paul McNeil and Richard All**	**Electric Soup** and **Gorilla Biscuit** by **Hoodoo Gurus**
**1993** (7th)	Angie Hart and Louise Beach	Marvin the Album by Frente!
**1993** (7th)	Ian Martin and Adrienne Overall	Hepfidelity by Diesel
**1993** (7th)	Midnight Oil and Neo One Design	Scream in Blue by Midnight Oil
**1993** (7th)	Pascoe & Gray Design and Eryk Photography	Better Times by The Black Sorrows
**1994** (8th)
**1994** (8th)	**Pierre Baroni / Mushroom Art**	**Bitch Epic** by **Deborah Conway**
**1994** (8th)	Kristyna Higgins and Jan Manby	The Honeymoon Is Over by The Cruel Sea
**1994** (8th)	Marcelle Lunam	The Yearning by Things of Stone and Wood
**1994** (8th)	Nick Seymour	Together Alone by Crowded House
**1994** (8th)	Kevin Wilkins and Midnight Oil	Earth and Sun and Moon by Midnight Oil
**1995** (9th)
**1995** (9th)	**Dominic O'Brien**	**A Million Year Girl** by **Max Sharam**
**1995** (9th)	Simon Anderson	The Electric Hippies by Electric Hippies
**1995** (9th)	Simon Anderson	Hi Fi Way by You Am I
**1995** (9th)	The Cruel Sea, Kristyna Higgins and Jim Paton	Three Legged Dog by The Cruel Sea
**1995** (9th)	Reg Mombassa	Mr Natural by Mental As Anything
**1996** (10th)
**1996** (10th)	**Reg Mombassa**	**Liar Liar Pants on Fire** by **Mental As Anything**
**1996** (10th)	Simon Anderson	Hourly, Daily by You Am I
**1996** (10th)	Rockin' Doodles, Quan Yeomans and Ben Ely	Tu-Plang by Regurgitator
**1996** (10th)	Janet English and George Stajsic	The Unfinished Spanish Galleon of Finley Lake by Spiderbait
**1996** (10th)	Tony Mahoney	The Soft 'N Sexy Sound by Dave Graney
**1997** (11th)
**1997** (11th)	**John Watson, John O'Donnell, Kevin Wilkins** and **Silverchair**	**Freak Show** by **Silverchair**
**1997** (11th)	Janet English	Ivy and the Big Apples by Spiderbait
**1997** (11th)	Pierre Baroni	Songs from the South by Paul Kelly
**1997** (11th)	Simon Anderson and Dean Manning	Angel Blood by Leonardo's Bride
**1997** (11th)	Tony Mahony	The Devil Drives by Dave Graney & the Coral Snakes
**1998** (12th)
**1998** (12th)	**The Shits**	**Unit** by **Regurgitator**
**1998** (12th)	Carl Breitkreuz and Ian Downie	To Hal and Bacharach by various artists
**1998** (12th)	Dominic O'Brien, Matt Thomas, Rachel Boyce and Alison Smith	Pink Pills by The Mavis's
**1998** (12th)	William Tennent and Chris Tennent	Sumo by The Superjesus
**1998** (12th)	Kevin Wilkins	20,000 Watt R.S.L. by Midnight Oil
**1999** (13th)
**1999** (13th)	**Kevin Wilkins**	**Internationalist** by **Powderfinger**
**1999** (13th)	Janet English and George Stajsic	Grand Slam by Spiderbait
**1999** (13th)	Reg Mombassa	Garage by Mental As Anything
**1999** (13th)	John Watson, Kevin Wilkins and Melissa Chenery	Neon Ballroom by Silverchair
**1999** (13th)	Quan Yeomans and Janet English	Welcome to Happyland by Happyland
**2000** (14th)
**2000** (14th)	**Janet English**	**"Glokenpop"** by **Spiderbait**
**2000** (14th)	Mark Gowling	Road Kill by Groove Terminator
**2000** (14th)	Paul Kosky	Reflector by Killing Heidi
**2000** (14th)	Love Police	Triple J Hottest 100 Vol 6 by Various
**2000** (14th)	Kevin Wilkins	"Passenger" by Powderfinger
**2001** (15th)
**2001** (15th)	**Kevin Wilkins**	**Odyssey Number Five** by **Powderfinger**
**2001** (15th)	Bobbydazzler (a.k.a. Darren Seltmann, Robbie Chater)	Since I Left You by The Avalanches
**2001** (15th)	Darren Glindemann	Jet Age by The Superjesus
**2001** (15th)	Sam Hickey	Sunset Studies by Augie March
**2001** (15th)	Stephanie Ashworth	Echolalia by Something for Kate
**2002** (16th)
**2002** (16th)	**Darren Glindemann, John Watson, Melissa Chenery** and **Daniel Johns**	**Diorama** by **Silverchair**
**2002** (16th)	Art of the State and Scott James Smith	Torch the Moon by The Whitlams
**2002** (16th)	Campbell Murray Creating	Barricades & Brickwalls by Kasey Chambers
**2002** (16th)	Chris Von Sanden	Polyserena by george
**2002** (16th)	Craig Nicholls	Highly Evolved by Highly Evolved
**2003** (17th)
**2003** (17th)	**Steven Gorrow** and **Revolution Design**	**Vulture Street** by **Powderfinger**
**2003** (17th)	Jenny Sullivan and Sony Music Design	Innocent Eyes by Delta Goodrem
**2003** (17th)	Adalita and Steven Gorrow	Tough Love by Magic Dirt
**2003** (17th)	Stephanie Ashworth and David Homer (Sony Music Design)	The Official Fiction by Something for Kate
**2003** (17th)	James Bellesini and Love Police	Deliverance by You Am I
**2004** (18th)
**2004** (18th)	**James Hackett**	**The Dissociatives** by **The Dissociatives**
**2004** (18th)	Peter Barrett and Eskimo Joe	A Song Is a City by Eskimo Joe
**2004** (18th)	James Bellesini and Love Police	Winning Days by The Vines
**2004** (18th)	James Bellesini and Love Police	The Cream & The Crock by You Am I
**2004** (18th)	Mathematics	Wayward Angel by Kasey Chambers
**2004** (18th)	Tom Walker	Sunrise Over Sea by John Butler Trio
**2005** (19th)
**2005** (19th)	**Ben Lee, Lara Meyerratken** and **Dan Estabrook**	**Awake Is the New Sleep** by **Ben Lee**
**2005** (19th)	Cameron Bird	In Case We Die by Architecture in Helsinki
**2005** (19th)	Cathie Glassby	The Sound of White by Missy Higgins
**2005** (19th)	David Homer, Aaron Hayward (Debaser)	United Paper People by Kisschasy
**2005** (19th)	Reg Mombassa	Foggy Highway by Paul Kelly & the Stormwater Boys
**2006** (20th)
**2006** (20th)	**Debaser**	**Tea & Sympathy** by **Bernard Fanning**
**2006** (20th)	Alison Smith and Chris Cheney – The Living End	State of Emergency by The Living End
**2006** (20th)	Dane Lovett and Dave Snow	Black Fingernails, Red Wine by Eskimo Joe
**2006** (20th)	Luke Steele, James Bellesini and Love Police	Personality – One Was a Spider, One Was a Bird by The Sleepy Jackson
**2006** (20th)	The Grates	Gravity Won't Get You High by The Grates
**2007** (21st)
**2007** (21st)	**Aaron Hayward** and **Dave Homer (Debaser)**	**Dream Days at the Hotel Existence** by **Powderfinger**
**2007** (21st)	Wally de Backer	Mixed Blood by Gotye
**2007** (21st)	John Engelhardt	The Hard Road: Restrung by Hilltop Hoods
**2007** (21st)	Sharon Chai and Sarah Blasko	What the Sea Wants, the Sea Will Have by Sarah Blasko
**2007** (21st)	Hackett Films	Young Modern by Silverchair
**2008** (22nd)
**2008** (22nd)	**Jonathan Zawada**	**Apocalypso** by **The Presets**
**2008** (22nd)	Aaron Hayward & David Homer (Debaser)	Be the Twilight by Faker
**2008** (22nd)	Aaron Hayward & David Homer (Debaser)	Rattlin' Bones by Kasey Chambers and Shane Nicholson
**2008** (22nd)	Alter	In Ghost Colours by Cut Copy
**2008** (22nd)	IOSHVA	A Book Like This by Angus & Julia Stone
**2009** (23rd)
**2009** (23rd)	**Aaron Hayward and David Homer (Debaser)**	**Walking on a Dream** by **Empire of the Sun**
**2009** (23rd)	C. W. Stoneking	Jungle Blues by C. W. Stoneking
**2009** (23rd)	Mathematics	Inshalla by Eskimo Joe
**2009** (23rd)	Sarah Larnach	Ladyhawke by Ladyhawke
**2009** (23rd)	Sharon Chai	As Day Follows Night by Sarah Blasko
**2010** (24th)
**2010** (24th)	**Angus & Julia Stone**	**Down the Way** by **Angus & Julia Stone**
**2010** (24th)	Cameron Gray and Scott Smith	This Is the Warning by Dead Letter Circus
**2010** (24th)	David Homer and Aaron Hayward (Debaser)	Birds of Tokyo by Birds of Tokyo
**2010** (24th)	Debaser	Head of the Hawk by Bluejuice
**2010** (24th)	Leif Podhajsky	Innerspeaker by Tame Impala
**2011** (25th)
**2011** (25th)	**Alter**	**Zonoscope** by **Cut Copy**
**2011** (25th)	Aaron Hayward and David Homer (Debaser)	The Experiment by Art vs. Science
**2011** (25th)	Aaron Hayward and David Homer (Debaser)	Tangier by Billy Thorpe
**2011** (25th)	Carlo Santone	Rrakala by Geoffrey Gurrumul Yunupingu
**2011** (25th)	Ken Done	Great Barrier Grief by Oh Mercy
**2012** (26th)
**2012** (26th)	**Frank de Backer** and **Wally de Backer**	**Making Mirrors** by **Gotye**
**2012** (26th)	Carlo Santone	"Bayini" by Gurrumul featuring Sarah Blasko
**2012** (26th)	Christopher Doyle	Prisoner by The Jezabels
**2012** (26th)	Debaser	Falling & Flying by 360
**2012** (26th)	Rennie Ellis	Deep Heat by Oh Mercy
**2013** (27th)
**2013** (27th)	**Aaron Hayward and David Homer (Debaser)**	**Ice on the Dune** by **Empire of the Sun**
**2013** (27th)	Glen Hannah	Wreck & Ruin by Kasey Chambers and Shane Nicholson
**2013** (27th)	Graeme Base	Steal the Light by The Cat Empire
**2013** (27th)	Justin Maller	Circus in the Sky by Bliss n Eso
**2013** (27th)	Kevin Parker and Leif Podhajsky	Lonerism by Tame Impala
**2014** (28th)
**2014** (28th)	**Tin & Ed**	**Built on Glass** by **Chet Faker**
**2014** (28th)	Angus & Julia Stone	Angus & Julia Stone by Angus & Julia Stone
**2014** (28th)	Celeste Potter	Black Rat by DZ Deathrays
**2014** (28th)	Sia Furler	1000 Forms of Fear by Sia
**2014** (28th)	The Leonard Brothers	Utopia by 360
**2015** (29th)
**2015** (29th)	**Courtney Barnett**	**Sometimes I Sit and Think, and Sometimes I Just Sit** by **Courtney Barnett**
**2015** (29th)	Daniel Johns, Aref and Peter Salmon-Lomas	Talk by Daniel Johns
**2015** (29th)	Timothy Lovett	Down To Earth by Flight Facilities
**2015** (29th)	Bjenny Montero	Man It Feels Like Space Again by Pond
**2015** (29th)	Nathan Johnson	The Positions by Gang of Youths
**2016** (30th)
**2016** (30th)	**Johnathan Zawada**	**Skin** by **Flume**
**2016** (30th)	Karen Lynch	Civil Dusk by Bernard Fanning
**2016** (30th)	Kristen Doyle	Wings of the Wild by Delta Goodrem
**2016** (30th)	Jack Vanzet	Bloom by RÜFÜS
**2016** (30th)	Robbie Chater for Lost Art	Wildflower by The Avalanches
**2017** (31st)
**2017** (31st)	**Peter Salmon-Lomas**	**Life Is Fine** by **Paul Kelly**
**2017** (31st)	Lee McConnell	The Kids Will Know It's Bullshit by Dune Rats
**2017** (31st)	Nathan Cahyadi	Go Farther in Lightness by Gang of Youths
**2017** (31st)	Nick McKinlay	Don't Let the Kids Win by Julia Jacklin
**2017** (31st)	Mitchell Storck	The Overflow Tank by Midnight Oil
**2018** (32nd)
**2018** (32nd)	**Caiti Baker**	**Djarimirri (Child of the Rainbow)** by **Gurrumul**
**2018** (32nd)	Ben Lopez	Flow State by Tash Sultana
**2018** (32nd)	Dean Hanson	Good Mood by Ball Park Music
**2018** (32nd)	Jonathan Zawada	Hi Viz by The Presets
**2018** (32nd)	Steve Wyper	Love Monster by Amy Shark
**2019** (33rd)
**2019** (33rd)	**Emilie Pfitzner**	**Better in Blak** by **Thelma Plum**
**2019** (33rd)	Ben Jones	Amyl and the Sniffers by Amyl and the Sniffers
**2019** (33rd)	Jonathan Zawada	Hi This is Flume by Flume
**2019** (33rd)	Lucy Dyson	Nature by Paul Kelly
**2019** (33rd)	Nick Mckk	Crushing by Julia Jacklin
**2020** (34th)
**2020** (34th)	**Adam Dal Pozzo, Megan Washington and Michelle Pitiris**	**Batflowers** by **Washington**
**2020** (34th)	Louis Leimbach	14 Steps to a Better You by Lime Cordiale
**2020** (34th)	Luke Henery	Everything Is A-OK by Violent Soho
**2020** (34th)	Made in Katana	Hilda by Jessica Mauboy
**2020** (34th)	Tim Rogers	Mr Experience by Donny Benét
**2021** (35th)
**2021** (35th)	**Kofi Anash & Bailey Howard**	**Smiling with No Teeth** by **Genesis Owusu**
**2021** (35th)	Ngaiire Joseph & Dan Segal	3 by Ngaiire
**2021** (35th)	Eben Ejdne	Herald by Odette
**2021** (35th)	Jonathan Zawada	We Will Always Love You by The Avalanches
**2021** (35th)	Giulia Giannini McGauran & Mitchell Eaton	Welcome to the Madhouse by Tones and I
**2022** (36th)
**2022** (36th)	**Adnate**	**Gela by Baker Boy**
**2022** (36th)	Giulia Giannini McGauran	How to Grow a Sunflower Underwater by Alex the Astronaut
**2022** (36th)	Jonathan Zawada	Palaces by Flume
**2022** (36th)	Kayla Flett, Gabi Coulthurst & Dimathaya Burarrwanga	King Stingray by King Stingray
**2022** (36th)	Seshanka Samarajiwa, Zain Ayub & Tasman Keith	A Colour Undone by Tasman Keith
**2023** (37th)
**2023** (37th)	**Jeremy Koren (Grey Ghost)**	**Everything Was Green by Forest Claudette**
**2023** (37th)	Connor Dewhurst	Acres by Brad Cox
**2023** (37th)	Harry Allen — Studio Balcony	370HSSV 0773H by Private Function
**2023** (37th)	Peach PRC, Billy Zammit	Manic Dream Pixie by Peach PRC
**2023** (37th)	Sam Netterfiled, Mia Rankin	Jesus at the Gay Bar by Cub Sport
**2024** (38th)
**2024** (38th)	**Daniel Boyd and Nomad Create**	**Kill the Dead by 3%**
**2024** (38th)	Giulia McGauran & Sam Chirnside	Beautifully Ordinary by Tones and I
**2024** (38th)	Louis Leimbach	Enough of the Sweet Talk by Lime Cordiale
**2024** (38th)	Michael Bryers	Between the Fires by Troy Cassar-Daley
**2024** (38th)	Tomas Shanahan	Chorus by Mildlife
**2025** (39th)
**2025** (39th)	**John Stewart**	**Cartoon Darkness by Amyl and the Sniffers**
**2025** (39th)	Giulia McGauran	Bird in Paradise by The Cat Empire
**2025** (39th)	Kira Puru and Em Jensen	I'm Sorry, Now Say It Back by Thelma Plum
**2025** (39th)	Nina Wilson, John You and Aria Zarzycki	I Love My Computer by Ninajirachi
**2025** (39th)	Sarah McCloskey	Fall from the Light by Hilltop Hoods
**2026** (40th)
**2026** (40th)	**Ecca Vandal, Kathryn Vinella and Sean McDonald**	**Looking for People to Unfollow by Ecca Vandal**
**2026** (40th)	Aurie Indianna and Sulaiman Enayatzada	Djandjay by Baker Boy
**2026** (40th)	Connor Dewhurst	Soft Pop by Amy Shark
**2026** (40th)	Kofi Owusu-Ansah, Isaac Brown and Gina Wagstaffe	Redstar Wu & the Worldwide Scourge by Genesis Owusu
**2026** (40th)	Miriam David and Pat Fox	Tragic Magic by Matt Corby
