= A Loud Call =

Studio album by Holly Throsby
- Released: 14 July 2008
- Studios: Beech House, South Nashville; Tony Dupé, Kangaroo Valley
- Genre: Indie folk
- Length: 42:54
- Label: Spunk/EMI
- Producer: Mark Nevers

Holly Throsby chronology
| Under the Town (2006) | A Loud Call (2008) | See! (2010) |

A Loud Call is the third studio album by Australian indie-folk artist Holly Throsby. It was released on 14 July 2008, which peaked at No. 34 on the ARIA Albums Chart. Throsby worked with Nashville-based producer, Mark Nevers (Lambchop, Andrew Bird). At the ARIA Music Awards of 2008 she was nominated for Best Female Artist for the album.

== Background ==
Most of A Loud Call, the third studio album by Australian indie folk singer-songwriter, Holly Throsby, was recorded at Beech House Studios, the residence of producer Mark Nevers, in South Nashville, United States. Nevers had previously produced material for Lambchop and Andrew Bird. Some additional recording of strings and horns was done at Tony Dupé's home studio in Kangaroo Valley, New South Wales.

A Loud Call was Radio National's album of the week when it was released on 14 July 2008. The album peaked at No. 34 on the ARIA Albums Chart. In September 2008, Throsby was nominated for Best Female Artist at the ARIA Music Awards of 2008 for the album.

== Track listing ==
All tracks are written by Holly Throsby, unless otherwise noted

A Loud Call track listing
| No. | Title | Length |
|---|---|---|
| 1. | "Warm Jets" | 3:55 |
| 2. | "A Heart Divided" (Throsby, Bree van Reyk) | 3:37 |
| 3. | "Now I Love Someone" | 3:56 |
| 4. | "On the Wharf" (Throsby, van Reyk) | 5:58 |
| 5. | "The Time It Takes" | 4:12 |
| 6. | "Would You?" (featuring Bonnie "Prince" Billy) | 3:12 |
| 7. | "One of You for Me" | 3:13 |
| 8. | "We Carry" | 3:46 |
| 9. | "And Then We're Gone" | 4:14 |
| 10. | "A Widow's Song" | 2:56 |
| 11. | "To Begin With" (Throsby, van Reyk) | 3:55 |
| Total length: | | 42:54 |

== Personnel ==
Credits:

Musicians

- Holly Throsby – guitars (acoustic, electric), keyboards, piano, lead vocals
- Bonnie "Prince" Billy – backing vocals, co-lead vocals ("Would You?")
- Jena Birchell – cello, bass guitar, mandolin
- Tony Crow – synthesiser, backing vocals
- Tony Dupé – clarinet, bass clarinet, French Horn, guitar, horn arrangements, piano, string arrangements, backing vocals
- Penny McBride – flugelhorn, trumpet, backing vocals
- Mark Nevers – guitar, backing vocals
- Matt Swanson – bass guitar, backing vocals
- Gary Tussing – cello
- William Tyler – electric guitar, backing vocals
- Bree van Reyk – drums, organ, accordion

Production details

- Jim DeMain – mastering engineer
- Tony Dupé – engineer
- Mark Nevers – audio engineer, audio production, engineer, mixing engineer
- Tim Whitten – mixing engineer

== Charts ==
Chart performance for A Loud Call
| Chart (2008) | Peak position |
|---|---|
| Australian Albums (ARIA) | 34 |
