= Under the Town =

Studio album by Holly Throsby
- Released: 20 July 2006
- Recorded: 2006
- Genre: Folk
- Length: 35:02
- Label: Spunk Records
- Producer: Tony Dupe

Holly Throsby chronology
On Night (2004)	Under the Town (2006)	A Loud Call (2008)

Under the Town is the second album by Australian folk singer-guitarist Holly Throsby. It was released on 20 July 2006 and peaked at No. 66 on the ARIA Albums Chart. At the ARIA Music Awards of 2006, Throsby was nominated in the 'Best Female Artist' category for Under the Town.

== Track listing ==
1. "Under the Town" – 2:22
2. "Making a Fire" – 3:39
3. "If We Go Easy" – 3:47
4. "On Longing" – 3:10
5. "I Worry Very Well" – 3:18
6. "Come Visit" – 3:05
7. "Swing On" – 3:53
8. "Shoulders and Bends" – 3:39
9. "What Becomes of Us" – 4:13
10. "Only a Rake" – 3:56

== Charts ==
Chart performance for Under the Town
Chart (2006)	Peak position
Australian Albums (ARIA)	66
