= He Will Have His Way =

Compilation album by Various Artists
- Released: 12 November 2010
- Genre: Pop, rock, folk
- Length: 61:06 (Regular Edition); 123:20 (Special Edition)
- Label: EMI

Various Artists chronology
She Will Have Her Way (2005)	He Will Have His Way (2010)	They Will Have Their Way (2011)

Professional ratings
Review scores
Source	Rating
Australian Broadcasting Corporation	(favourable)
Herald Sun	(favourable)

He Will Have His Way is a compilation album featuring male Australian and New Zealand musicians performing songs written by Neil Finn and Tim Finn (The Finn Brothers), who are best known as members of Split Enz and Crowded House. It was released on 12 November 2010 and is a sequel to She Will Have Her Way, a 2005 album featuring female Australian and New Zealand musicians. The two albums were later released together with extra tracks as the double CD They Will Have Their Way.

== Background ==
The album's title is a masculine adaptation of She Will Have Her Way, which in turn took its name from Neil Finn's single, "She Will Have Her Way", from his album Try Whistling This, however neither compilation features the song.

== Chart performance ==
On 21 November 2010, the album debuted at number 5 on the Australian Albums Chart.

== Track listings ==
1. "I Feel Possessed" (Oh Mercy) – 3:15
2. "Distant Sun" (Chris Cheney) – 3:29
3. "Fall at Your Feet" (Boy & Bear) – 4:31
4. "Four Seasons in One Day" (Paul Kelly & Angus Stone) – 4:18
5. "She Got Body, She Got Soul" (Glenn Richards) – 3:02
6. "Addicted" (Paul Dempsey) – 4:09
7. "Message to My Girl" (Jimmy Barnes) – 4:33
8. "I See Red" (Art vs. Science) – 4:01
9. "I Got You" (Philadelphia Grand Jury) – 3:12
10. "Better Be Home Soon" (The Sleepy Jackson) – 4:35
11. "Private Universe" (Artisan Guns) – 4:15
12. "Not Even Close" (Darren Hayes) – 4:06
13. "Shark Attack" (The Break with Dan Sultan) – 4:31
14. "Poor Boy" (Perry Keyes) – 3:49
15. "Better Be Home Soon" (Busby Marou) – 3:49
16. "Kiss the Road of Rarotonga" (Kody Nielson) – 3:15
17. "Angels Heap" (Perry Keyes) – 4:05 (iTunes bonus track)

== Charts ==
=== Weekly charts ===
Chart (2010/11)	Peak position
Australian Albums (ARIA)	5

=== Year-end charts ===
Chart (2010)	Position
Australia (ARIA) Albums Chart	54

== Certifications and sales ==
Region	Certification	Certified units/sales
Australia (ARIA)	Gold	35,000^{^}
^{^} Shipments figures based on certification alone.
