= Deep Heat (Oh Mercy album) =

Studio album by Oh Mercy
- Released: August 2012
- Label: Casadeldisco Records
- Producers: Alexander Gow, Burke Reid

Oh Mercy chronology
Great Barrier Grief (2011)	Deep Heat (2012)	When We Talk About Love (2015)

Deep Heat is the third studio album by Australian indie rock band Oh Mercy. The album was released in August 2012 and peaked at number 21 on the ARIA Charts.

At the J Awards of 2012, the album was nominated for the Australian Album of the Year. At the ARIA Music Awards of 2012, the album was nominated for Best Rock Album and Best Cover Art.

== Track listing ==
1. "Deep Heat" - 3:38
2. "Rebel Beats" - 3:32
3. "My Man" - 4:04
4. "Fever" - 3:54
5. "Pilgrim's Blues" - 3:23
6. "Europa" - 2:54
7. "Suffocated" - 2:48
8. "Still Making Me Pay" - 4:09
9. "Drums" - 3:03
10. "Labour of Love" - 3:10

== Chart ==
Chart (2012)	Peak position
Australian Albums (ARIA)	21
