= Great Barrier Grief =

Studio album by Oh Mercy
- Released: March 2011
- Studio: Keith St Studio
- Label: Casadeldisco Records
- Producer: Mitchell Froom

Oh Mercy chronology
Privileged Woes (2009)	Great Barrier Grief (2011)	Deep Heat (2012)

Great Barrier Grief is the second studio album by Australian indie rock band Oh Mercy. The album was released in March 2011 and peaked at number 13 on the ARIA Charts.

At the ARIA Music Awards of 2011, the album was nominated for Breakthrough Artist – Album and Best Cover Art.

== Track listing ==
1. "Stay, Please Stay" - 3:04
2. "Keith St" - 4:00
3. "On the Run" - 3:25
4. "Mercy Valley" - 3:42
5. "Let Me Go" - 3:00
6. "Hold Out Your Hand" - 3:21
7. "Tenderness" - 4:04
8. "Confessions" - 2:47
9. "Blue Lagoon" - 3:59
10. "What You Do" - 3:30
11. "Doldrums" - 2:55

== Chart ==
Chart (2011)	Peak position
Australian Albums (ARIA)	13
