= Privileged Woes =

Studio album by Oh Mercy
- Released: August 2009
- Label: Casadeldisco Records
- Producer: Myles Wootton

Oh Mercy chronology
In the Nude for Love (2009)	Privileged Woes (2009)	Great Barrier Grief (2011)

Privileged Woes is the debut studio album by Australian indie rock band Oh Mercy, released in August 2009.

At the J Awards of 2009, the album was nominated for Australian Album of the Year. The album was also nominated for the 2009 Australian Music Prize.

== Track listing ==
1. "Lay Everything On Me" - 3:08
2. "Seemed Like a Good Idea" - 2:41
3. "Met a Wizard" - 3:40
4. "Get You Back" - 3:07
5. "By the Collar" - 3:01
6. "Astrid, No" - 3:19
7. "Broken Ears" - 3:34
8. "In Good Time" - 3:09
9. "Can't Fight It" - 2:12
10. "Couldn't Let You Drown" - 2:59
11. "What Good Is That" - 3:40

== Charts ==
Chart (2009)	Peak position
Australian (ARIA Hitseekers Albums)	3
