= Spdfgh =

Australian rock band

- Origin: Sydney, New South Wales, Australia
- Genres: Rock, indie rock
- Years active: 1990–1997
- Labels: Half a Cow; Dirt Records
- Past members: Kim Bowers; Liz Payne; Tania Bowers; Melanie Thurgar

Spdfgh (/ˈspʌdəˈfʌɡəhə/) were an Australian rock band formed in 1990. The founding members were: Kim Bowers (as Wikky Malone) (guitar, vocals), Liz Payne (as Rosy Glo, Lou Marvel, Belle) (guitar, vocals), Tania Bowers (as Tania May) (bass guitar, vocals), Melanie Thurgar (as Finnius) (drums), and Angela Morosin (vocals).

== Name origin ==
In chemistry, the letters (spdfgh...) are used when determining the number of electrons in the shells of an atom (the letters denote the first six states of orbital angular momentum in atomic physics). TV Week magazine called it "the dumbest name in Australian rock".

== History ==
The original members got started playing together at St. Patrick's College (Campbelltown, southwest of Sydney). A very early gig was the St Patrick's School disco and featured the unreleased "Help! Help! It's a dance party!" The band and Morosin parted company soon after high school.

In their early days, to get noticed, they would travel to Sydney, sneak into soundchecks of bands they liked and just start playing. Payne left after the group had recorded Leave Me Like This and Sally Russell (later known as New Buffalo, Sally Seltmann) briefly replaced her on guitar in mid-1995. Russell, still a member of power pop group Lustre 4, had co-written the track "You Made Me" with Tania (later known as Via Tania) for that album. Russell continued her work with Lustre 4 and was replaced in Spdfgh by Christina Hannaford by the time the album was issued.

The band had songs included on the soundtracks of the films Love and Other Catastrophes and The Well.

After breaking up, the members pursued new projects:

- Kim Bowers recorded some electronic tracks under the name of 'Deep in Sound', which appeared on the soundtrack to the 1999 Australian film, Fresh Air. She later worked with her sister, Candy Bowers, on hip-hop group / theatrical performers Sista She. Kim Bowers died from breast cancer in April 2026.
- Tania Bowers went on to Godstar, contributed songs to the Fresh Air soundtrack under the name of "Sunday", and has since released an album under of the name Via Tania—with help from her husband, sound engineer Casey Rice. In April 2020, under the name T Wilds, Tania released a single "I Swim" from forthcoming album due out 2021.
- Payne went on to Rocket and Sonic Emotion Explosion, both with former Gerling guitarist Brad Herdson. The duo has since renamed themselves to Little Sky and turned into a fully-fledged band.
- As of 2009, Thurgar is drumming in Sydney-based Hard Rock outfit Death By Proxy.

== Discography ==
=== Albums ===
List of albums, with selected details
Title	Details
Leave Me Like This	Released: 1996; Format: CD; Label: Half a Cow Records (HAC 46)

=== Extended plays ===
List of EPs, with selected details
Title	Details
Grassroots	Released: 1994; Format: CD; Label: Half a Cow Records (HAC 31)

== See also ==
- List of all-women bands
