= The Last Beautiful Day =

Studio album by New Buffalo
- Released: 14 September 2004
- Recorded: May – December 2003
- Studio: The Lonely Studio
- Genre: Indie rock
- Length: 35:58
- Labels: Dot Dash, Arts & Crafts
- Producer: Sally Seltmann

New Buffalo chronology
About Last Night (EP) (2001)	The Last Beautiful Day (2004)	New Buffalo (2005)

Professional ratings
Review scores
Source	Rating
The Age	link
Allmusic	link
Pitchfork Media	(6.8/10) link
Sputnik Music	link

The Last Beautiful Day is the debut album by New Buffalo.

After their debut EP, About Last Night, New Buffalo received interest from the record label Heavenly Recordings, who funded sessions with producer Jake Davies in Los Angeles. However, these sessions were not completed, and New Buffalo's Sally Seltmann returned home to Melbourne. Instead, The Last Beautiful Day was recorded by Seltmann at the Lonely Studio, at her home in Yarraville with husband Darren Seltmann.

The album was released on the Dot Dash record label on 14 September 2004, and was distributed in Australia through Inertia. It was subsequently released by P-Vine Records in Japan on 6 June 2005 by Arts & Crafts Productions in Canada on 23 August 2005. The album was written, performed, recorded, and produced by Sally Seltmann of New Buffalo, with the exception of backing vocals from Beth Orton on the track "Inside", and drums from Jim White on the tracks "No Party", "Inside" and "While You're Away".

== Reception ==
Reviews of The Last Beautiful Day were largely positive, focusing on Seltmann's strengths with melody, and the album's mix of indie folk and electronic sounds and sampling. Rob Mitchum of Pitchfork described the album as having "dreamy-indie qualities" and that Seltmann was a "forward-thinking indie-folkster, not one to shy away from technology." Stewart Mason of Allmusic pointed out that Seltmann has a "clear voice that's a more substantial and varied instrument than many of her more wispy contemporaries; Seltmann is also a clever melodicist with a knack for plainspoken but evocative lyrics." A staff writer in The Age called the album "an unqualified joy" that used "bubbling vintage keyboards, ringing guitar and understated orchestral samples to provide a rich, uncluttered foundation for wistful songs of love and intimacy". A staff writer at the Sydney Morning Herald described the album as having a "sometimes surprising gentleness" and that Seltmann "brings an affecting warmth to her songs and creates her own little out-of-its-time world", but that the album "is easy to drift into and be lulled", which "can sometimes work against her, particularly towards the end of the album".

== Track listing ==
1. "Recovery" - 3:41
2. "I've Got You and You've Got Me (Song of Contentment)" - 3:54
3. "No Party" - 3:06
4. "It'll Be Alright" - 3:31
5. "Time to Go to Sleep" - 4:03
6. "Yes" - 3:10
7. "Inside" - 4:16
8. "Come Back" - 4:08
9. "While You're Away" - 3:30
10. "On Sunday" - 2:43

== Personnel ==
- Sally Seltmann - writing, recording, production, mixing, vocals, guitar, bass, piano, keys & programming
- Franc Tetaz - mixing & mastering
- Beth Orton - backing vocals (7)
- Jim White - drums (3,7,9)
- Tony Espie - mixing (1,3)

All songs were recorded at The Lonely Studio from May 2003 to December 2003. All songs written, recorded and produced by New Buffalo.
