= Somewhere, Anywhere =

Studio album by New Buffalo
- Released: 24 March 2007
- Recorded: 2006
- Genre: Indie rock
- Length: 35:30
- Labels: Dot Dash; Arts & Crafts

New Buffalo chronology
New Buffalo (2005)	Somewhere, Anywhere (2007)

Somewhere, Anywhere is the second studio album by the Australian indie rockers, New Buffalo, which was released on 24 March 2007, before its founder performed and recorded under her married name, Sally Seltmann. It peaked at No. 4 on the ARIA Hitseekers Albums Chart; and was nominated for the 2007 ARIA Award for Best Adult Contemporary Album.

== Reception ==
Professional ratings
Review scores
Source	Rating
AllMusic	4/5 stars

AllMusic's Stewart Mason wrote that the album was "the work of a musician who has found her own voice" and that Seltmann "has roots in the Aussie indie pop scene of the early '90s, but Somewhere, Anywhere, is a sparse and primarily electronic album of dreamy, minor-key tunes that trade in subtlety and delicacy".

== Track listing ==
1. "Cheer Me Up Thank You" – 3:12
2. "It's True" – 3:33
3. "City and Sea (Lady Nameless)" – 3:26
4. "Stay with Us" – 4:29
5. "Emotional Champ" – 3:22
6. "You've Gone My Friend" – 3:02
7. "Versary" – 3:10
8. "I'm the Drunk and You're the Star" – 3:50
9. "It's Got to Be Jean" – 3:47
10. "Misery and Mountains, Arrows and Bows" – 3:39
11. "Lobe Limbique" – 4:10

== Charts ==
Chart performance for Somewhere, Anywhere
Chart (2007)	Peak position
Australian Albums (ARIA)	80
