= New Buffalo (EP) =

EP by New Buffalo
- Released: 25 July 2005
- Recorded: 2005
- Genre: Indie rock
- Length: 18:11
- Label: Dot Dash; Arts & Crafts

New Buffalo chronology
The Last Beautiful Day (2004)	New Buffalo (2005)	Somewhere, Anywhere (2007)

New Buffalo is an EP by New Buffalo, released on 25 July 2005. It featured three songs remixed and reworked from her debut album and two original songs.

== Track listing ==
1. "I've Got You & You've Got Me (Version Two)" - 3:41
2. "Trigger" - 4:00
3. "Recovery" (Fanclub Remix by Simenon & Smith) - 3:31
4. "Inside (The Corrections)" featuring Jens Lekman - 3:33
5. "The Beginning of the End" - 3:27
