= Holly Throsby =

Australian musician and writer

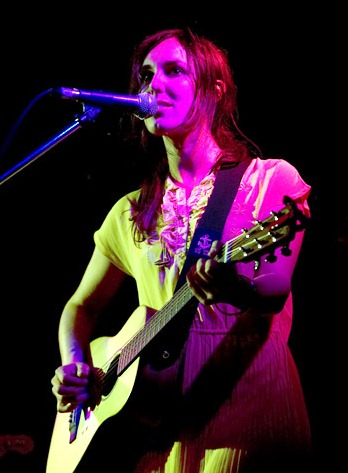
- Holly Throsby, The Corner Hotel, Melbourne; September 2008

Background information
- Born: Holly Sarah Throsby
- Origin: Sydney, Australia
- Genres: Folk; indie folk; indie pop
- Occupations: Singer-songwriter, musician, novelist
- Instruments: Guitar; piano; vocals
- Years active: 2004–present
- Labels: Spunk/EMI, ABC
- Website: hollythrosby.com

Holly Sarah Throsby is an Australian musician and novelist.

Her work as a solo artist has produced six albums. She was nominated for an ARIA Award for Best Female Artist in 2006 for Under the Town; and in the same category in 2008 for A Loud Call. In 2011, she was nominated for an ARIA Award for Best Children's Album for See!, her album of alternative children's songs. Throsby has toured extensively both internationally and in Australia, with artists including Joanna Newsom, Paul Kelly, Sun Kil Moon, Devendra Banhart, and The Tallest Man on Earth.

Throsby is a member of Seeker Lover Keeper, with fellow singer-songwriters, Sally Seltmann and Sarah Blasko. They released an album of the same name in June 2011, which peaked at No. 3 and was nominated for an ARIA Music Awards of 2011 for Best Alternative Album in that year. The band's second album, Wild Seeds (2019) and was nominated for an ARIA Music Awards of 2019 for Best Adult Contemporary Album. The album was accompanied by three music videos starring Australian actors Magda Szubanski, Madeleine Madden, and Yael Stone.

Throsby's debut novel, Goodwood, was published by Allen & Unwin on 28 September 2016. Goodwood came in at number 7 on the ABC's Book Club's Top Ten and was number 3 on Dymocks' list of the Best Books of 2016. Goodwood has been since been shortlisted for an Indie Book Award, two Australian Book Industry Awards, two Davitt Awards (from Sisters in Crime), a Ned Kelly Award, and the Barbara Jeffris Award. Her second novel, Cedar Valley, was published in September 2018. It was longlisted for an Indie Book Award and a Davitt Award. Throsby's third novel, Clarke, was published in 2022.

== Early life and family ==
Holly Sarah Throsby is the daughter of Margaret Throsby, a radio presenter on Australian Broadcasting Corporation's ABC Classic; and John Buttsworth, a psychiatrist and art and furniture dealer. Her uncle, David Throsby is a cultural economist, and her maternal grandmother was a cellist in the Sydney Symphony Orchestra.

Throsby grew up in Sydney and began studying guitar at the age of 8. She studied classical guitar techniques and began composing from the age of 11. She attended Hunters Hill High School for her secondary education.

Her older half-brother, Timothy Marc, died in a motorcycle accident in Thailand in 1996. Throsby later recalled the death of her brother "I was 17 when [he] died and I had one exam left in my HSC. I went to the exam and did all that stuff because I thought you had to keep on doing that stuff and I didn't stop... Those things affect you. I think it has made me scared. It made me scared to travel because he died when he was in Bangkok. It made me scared to get on a motorcycle, which I've never done. It made me scared when other people travel away from me". After earning a B.A. degree (major in English) from the University of Sydney, Throsby worked at an art house video store for several years and travelled overseas, including living in Austin, Texas for six months.

== Solo musical career ==
=== 2003: Debut album ===
During 2003 Throsby recorded her debut album, On Night (11 November 2004), with experimental producer, Tony Dupé, at his cottage on Saddleback Mountain, near Kiama. Throsby provided lead vocals and guitar, additional musicians were Dupé on piano and pump organ, Davey Cotsios on guitar and backing vocals, Abel Cross on bass guitar and double bass, and Joseph Fuse on drums. In Australia it appeared on the indie label, Spunk Records. AllMusic's Mark Deming described her album of "uncluttered but emotionally resonant songs made a major impact with critics". Chloe Persing of Woroni felt it was "a collection of quaint and delicate acoustic songs that have a lyrical focus on themes such as loneliness and distance, and have the ability to resonate quite powerfully".

Throsby toured Australia supporting various musical acts: Bonnie "Prince" Billy (a.k.a. Will Oldham), Joanna Newsom, Bill Callahan/ Smog, M. Ward, Devendra Banhart, Jose Gonzales, Low and The Eels. She toured in the United States, attending SXSW in 2005 and returning for a support tour with David Pajo (Slint, Interpol, Papa M). Throsby also toured Europe, including the United Kingdom, with Micah P. Hinson. In September 2005 Throsby's cover version of "Not the Girl You Think You Are" was compiled on the various artist's album, She Will Have Her Way – a tribute to singer-songwriters, and brothers, Tim and Neil Finn. Fellow female singers on the album include Sarah Blasko and Sally Seltmann (as New Buffalo).

=== 2006: Second album ===
In July 2006, Throsby released her second album, Under the Town, it was produced by Dupé again but included a larger group of session musicians. Dupé assisted with piano, bouzouki, clarinet and trumpet; Jens Birchall provided cello and double bass; Rebecca and Samantha Brown (twin sisters) both played violin, Jack Ladder was on bass guitar and Bree van Reyk played drums. It reached the ARIA Albums Chart top 100. It also reached No. 2 on the related Hitseekers Albums chart. The ARIA Report cited her "distinctive, fragile voice" with her "country-folk sound and poignant lyrics regarding all things from howling wolves to coffee pots" which have "struck a chord with music lovers". Under the Town was lauded by music critics; including the UK press with ratings of 3/5 in Uncut, 4/5 in Mojo, and 8/10 from Drowned in Sound's Dom Gourlay. At the ARIA Music Awards of 2006 Throsby was nominated for Best Female Artist for the album.

Ed Nimmervoll, an Australian music journalist, declared Under the Town to be his Feature Album for the week of 5 September that year. He explained that "she's moving on, growing. What hasn't changed is the revealing, daring nature of her songs, Holly musing on life and love in a quiet breathless provocative voice, accentuating every word. She's sensual and fragile. The songs are filled with images and feelings that spill between the songs". Mess+Noise's Craig Mathieson opined that "playfulness comes easily, but it's the unease that lingers" while her "voice has an airy, splintered tone – certain syllables crack under the pressure – and she uses it to move easily between gently plangent pop and formal folk constructs".

Throsby promoted the album with a national tour, interrupted by a short tour of New Zealand. She described her writing process to Laura MacIntyre of MediaSearch website, "I've never had any music lessons, I don't understand music theory. I make chord shapes, but I really just make things up as I go along ... I have ideas for a song, a song can start from one word, one image ... Melodies seem to pop out of thin air often, as if the song is already written, the melodies just seem to come. It's almost involuntary".

=== 2008: Third album ===
Throsby's third album, A Loud Call (July 2008), was produced in Nashville by Mark Nevers (Lambchop, Andrew Bird) with string and horn arrangements recorded in Kangaroo Valley (near Kiama) by Dupé. It includes guest vocals by Bonnie "Prince" Billy and guest musicians from Lambchop and Silver Jews. A Loud Call was hailed by the Australian and the British press as Throsby's strongest work. Joel Bryant of Same Same website praised its "instrumental depth, a notable departure from the bareness of her previous albums". Daily Mirror's Gavin Martin described Throsby as "sylph-like" and that "Pumping up the volume is not in [her] game plan" on her "alluring album" as she "knows decibels aren't needed to capture emotional wonders". Mark Deming of AllMusic felt she was "able to sound fragile and strong at the same time; there's a wary vulnerability in her breathy vocals, but the emotional power of her music is enough to persuade anyone that this is someone who possesses a firm will when she needs it".

A Loud Call peaked at No. 34 on the ARIA Albums Chart – her highest placement as a solo artist. At the ARIA Music Awards of 2008 it provided her second nomination as Best Female Artist. Throsby toured extensively in Australia, as well as tours in Europe with Paul Kelly, The Handsome Family, and The Tallest Man on Earth – who covered Throsby's track, "To Begin With", at his subsequent live shows. Throsby played at the St Jerome's Laneway, and Splendour in the Grass festivals in 2007 and 2009.

=== 2010: Children's album ===
In October 2010 Throsby released an album of original children's songs, See!. Billed as an alternative "black sheep" children's album, See! was recorded in January of that year with long-time collaborator Dupé and included guest cameos by Darren Hanlon, J. Walker, Jack Ladder and, her mother, Margaret Throsby. It was released through ABC Music. Throsby and her band, The Hello Tigers – with Bree van Reyk on drums and percussion and Jens Birchall on cello, bass and mandolin – have performed the album as a live show at festivals in the Australian state capitals including Sydney Festival, Brisbane Festival, Adelaide Festival Centre and Melbourne Arts Centre.

Throsby told Darren Levin of Mess+Noise, "I thought it'd be fun to make one for friends who had kids... hanging out with them, and babysitting them, and driving around in the car listening to this children's music that just made me want to stab my ears out... I thought it'd be a nice idea to make an album that wasn't like warbling 'Itsy Bitsy Spider' over a really bad background." At the ARIA Music Awards of 2011 she was nominated for an ARIA Award for Best Children's Album for See!.

=== 2011: Fifth album ===
In February 2011 Throsby released her fifth solo album, Team, which peaked in the ARIA Albums Chart top 50. It was recorded in a 19th-century church in Wildes Meadow with Dupé producing. Team received four-star reviews in the Australian and British press and was lauded as her most experimental album, eschewing traditional song structure for layered, intersecting vocals expressing varying points of view around the subject of a relationship breakdown. Chris Trout of Drowned in Sound found she was "a brilliant writer of melodies, even when shackled to a trad blueprint" where "the lyrics are affecting because the imagery Throsby employs is neither too personal and specific... nor too self-consciously 'poetic'... to communicate much to the listener except that she is in the presence of a Good Writer".

=== 2017: 6th album ===
Throsby released After a Time in 2017. Recorded by Tim Kevin, the album featured a Throsby-penned duet with Mark Kozelek called "What Do You Say?" and performances from Mick Turner from Dirty Three as well as Bree van Reyk, Jens Birchall and Marcus Whale (Collarbones, BV). After a Time was longlisted for the Australian Music Prize and was included in Rolling Stone Magazine's top 50 albums of the year, and music journalist Bernard Zuel's top 10. The song "What Do You Say?" had over 2.5 million streams on Spotify and the song "Aeroplane" had over 30 million streams.

== Collaborations ==
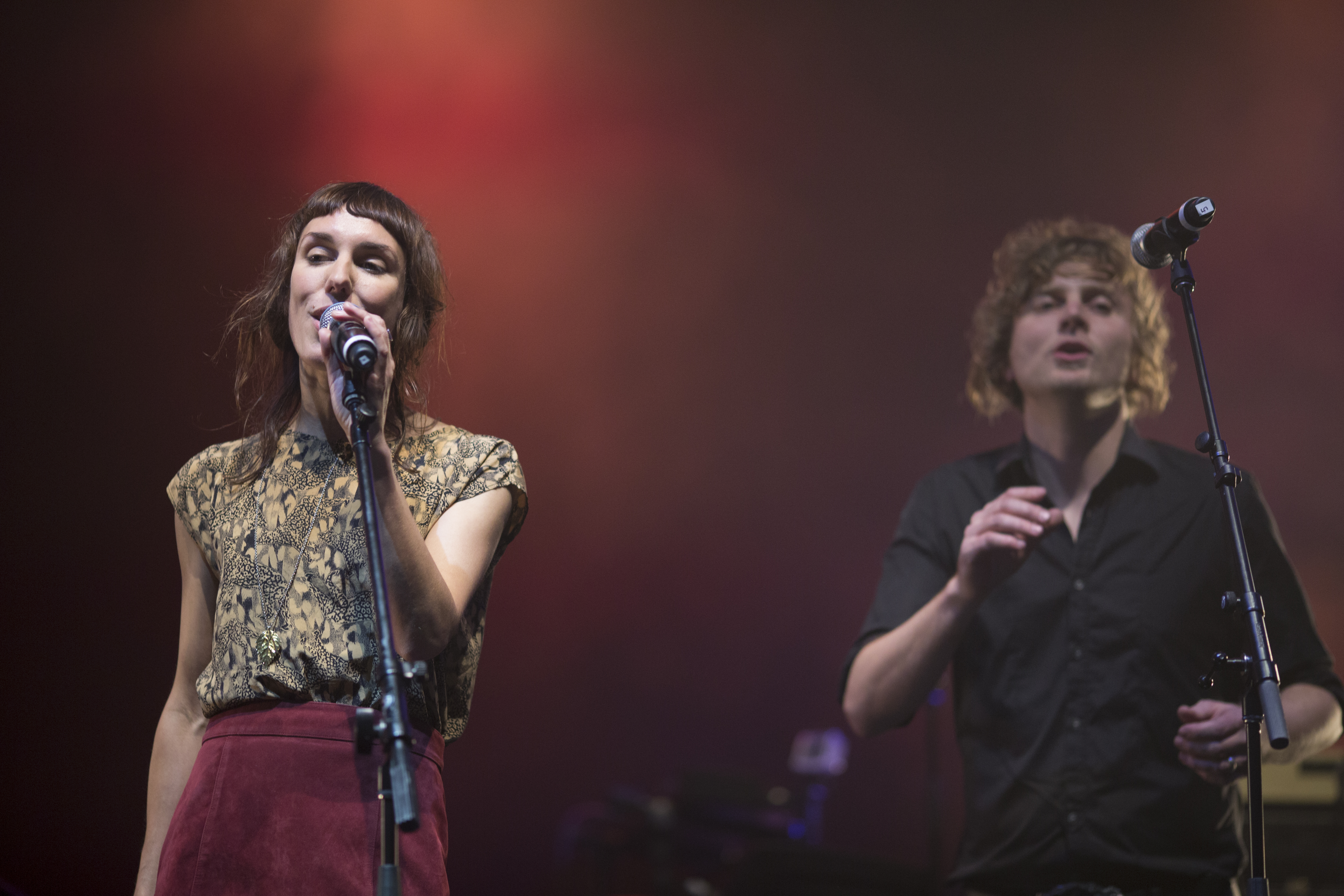
Holly Throsby & Kevin Mitchell performing at the Bob Dylan Tribute Concert, Sydney Opera House, July 2012.

Throsby has contributed to albums by Josh Pyke, The Sleepy Jackson, Hayden, TZU and Jack Ladder.

From August 2010 Throsby, along with Sarah Blasko and Sally Seltmann, was a member of the vocal trio, Seeker Lover Keeper. In June 2011 their debut album was released, which had been recorded in New York with engineer Victor Van Vugt (PJ Harvey, Nick Cave) and Dirty Three's drummer, Jim White as well as van Reyk on drums. It debuted at No. 3 on the ARIA Albums Chart and achieved gold accreditation. At the ARIA Music Awards of 2011 the album was nominated for Best Adult Alternative Album.

In October 2011 the trio provided a cover version of "Sinner" for the third Finn brothers tribute album by various artists, They Will Have Their Way, which also included Throsby's earlier rendition of "Not the Girl You Think You Are". To promote it Throsby and the group toured Australia with other artists on the related They Will Have Their Way Tour in November of that year. Seeker Lover Keeper completed two national tours in 2011 and 2012, before each artist resumed their solo careers.

In July 2012 Throsby undertook a tour of Bob Dylan Tribute Concerts with fellow Australian artists Patience Hodgson, Kevin Mitchell, Josh Pyke and Kav Temperley.

== Writing ==
In addition to recording, Throsby has written and illustrated two comic books which act as companion pieces to her albums.

Throsby's debut novel, Goodwood, was published by Allen & Unwin on 28 September 2016. Goodwood came in at No. 7 on ABC's The Book Club's Top Ten; and was No. 3 on Dymocks' list of the Best Books of 2016. It has since been shortlisted for an Indie Book Award, two Australian Book Industry Awards, two Sisters in Crime Davitt Awards, and a Ned Kelly Award. In support of the book, Throsby appeared at festivals including the Sydney Writers Festival, Perth Writers Festival, Adelaide Writers' Week, Newcastle Writers' Festival, and at numerous live book events, including in Melbourne, Brisbane and Hobart.

Her second novel, Cedar Valley, was published in September 2018. Throsby promoted the book with a large book tour and appeared at several writers' festivals across Australia. Cedar Valley makes reference to the real-life unsolved Australian mystery, the Somerton Man.

Throsby's third novel, Clarke, a crime novel described as "bush noir", was published in November 2022.

== Interests ==
- On her official website, Throsby lists her interests outside of songwriting as contemporary literature, political intrigue, cryptic crosswords, small towns and dogs.
- Throsby contributed a T-shirt design for The Yellow Bird Project to raise money for Amnesty International.
- Throsby sits on the council of Voiceless, the animal protection institute an independent non-profit think-tank dedicated to alleviating the suffering of animals in Australia. "I've always had a deep respect and empathy for animals. When they are exploited, I feel compelled to speak out."

== In popular culture ==
- Throsby's song "A Heart Divided" is featured on an international TV and cinema campaign for Tourism Victoria, filmed in Australia and Finland. The ad was directed by Mike Daly and aired during the Australian Open coverage in the U.S. in 2011, 2012, 2013 and in subsequent years
- Throsby's song 'To Begin With' has been covered live by The Tallest Man on Earth live.
- Her song 'Under The Town' was recorded by rock band Kisschasy. It was also remixed by Machine Translations and Mountains in the Sky.
- Sarah Blasko has covered 'We're Good People But Why Don't We Show It?'.
- On his 2015 Australian tour, Mark Kozelek of Sun Kil Moon and Red House Painters mentioned Throsby in the lyrics of an unreleased song about touring in Australia. Throsby and Kozelek toured together in Australia in 2005.
- Courtney Barnett covered the Seeker Lover Keeper song "Not Only I" (originally sung by Throsby) in her MTV Unpluggled album, as a duet with Marlon Williams.

== Personal life ==
Throsby wrote an article, "Sing out loud: marriage equality is in tune with the times", for The Sydney Morning Herald in December 2013 describing her same sex relationship: "I would like to be able to get married" but "Australian law says my partner and I aren't allowed". Throsby and her partner are the parents of a child: she described her family in Motherhood and Creativity (April 2015) by Rachel Power. The book includes interviews with other celebrities: Claudia Karvan, Rachel Griffiths, Clare Bowditch and Del Kathryn Barton.

Throsby discussed her cocaine use in Talking Smack (July 2014) by Andrew McMillen. The book features "Honest conversations about drugs" with other Australian musicians, including Paul Kelly, Gotye, Mick Harvey and Phil Jamieson.

Throsby contributed the opening chapter to Growing Up Queer in Australia (published 2019 by Black Inc. Books).

== Discography ==
=== Albums ===
List of solo studio albums, with selected chart positions
Title	Details	Peak chart positions
Title	Details	AUS
On Night	Released: 2004; Label: Spunk (URA 137)	—
Under the Town	Released: July 2006; Label: Spunk (URA 180)	66
A Loud Call	Released: July 2008; Label: Spunk (URA 244)	34
See!	Released: 2010; Label: ABC Music (2753234); Note: Children's music	—
Team	Released: February 2011; Label: Spunk (URA 335)	41
After a Time	Released: February 2017; Label: Spunk (URA 503)	56
Normal Magic	Releases: September 2026; Label: Independent	—

=== Singles/EPs ===
- Things Between People (2004)
- Everything Sings Out (2006)
- One of You for Me (2007)

=== Compilations ===
- She Will Have Her Way – cover of "Not the Girl You Think You Are" by Crowded House (26 September 2005)
- Like a Version: Volume 2 – cover of "Mistress" by Red House Painters (2006)
- Like a Version: Volume 5 – cover of "Berlin Chair" by You Am I (2009)
