= When We Talk About Love =

Studio album by Oh Mercy
- Released: June 2015
- Label: Casadeldisco Records
- Producer: Scott Horscroft

Oh Mercy chronology
| Deep Heat (2012) | When We Talk About Love (2015) | Café Oblivion (2018) |

When We Talk About Love is the fourth album by then-Australian indie rock band Oh Mercy. It was released in June 2015 and peaked at number 28 on the ARIA Charts.

At the ARIA Music Awards of 2015, the album won the ARIA Award for Best Adult Contemporary Album.

== Track listing ==
1. "Without You" - 4:17
2. "I Don't Really Want to Know" - 2:57
3. "Sandy" - 3:52
4. "Lady Eucalyptus" - 4:23
5. "Let Me Be Him" - 3:07
6. "If You Come Around Tonight" - 3:26
7. "Iron Cross" - 3:20
8. "All The Roads Lead to You" - 3:40
9. "I Believe It" - 2:42
10. "Can't You Hear My Body (Calling Out to You)" - 3:40
11. "Cool Waiter" - 3:21
12. "Catherine" - 2:41

== Chart ==
| Chart (2015) | Peak position |
|---|---|
| Australian Albums (ARIA) | 28 |
