= Heart That's Pounding =

Studio album by Sally Seltmann
- Released: 6 April 2010
- Genre: Indie rock
- Length: 40:39
- Label: Arts & Crafts
- Producers: Francois Tetaz & Sally Seltmann

Heart That's Pounding is an album by Sally Seltmann, released on 6 April 2010.

== Reception ==
Professional ratings
Review scores
Source	Rating
AllMusic	3.5/5 stars
Pitchfork	6.4/10

Critics have described the album as "buoyant at every turn, relishing layered whimsy as well as inventive details. Vocal harmonies are everywhere, and a wealth of synth and piano sounds distinguish each song".

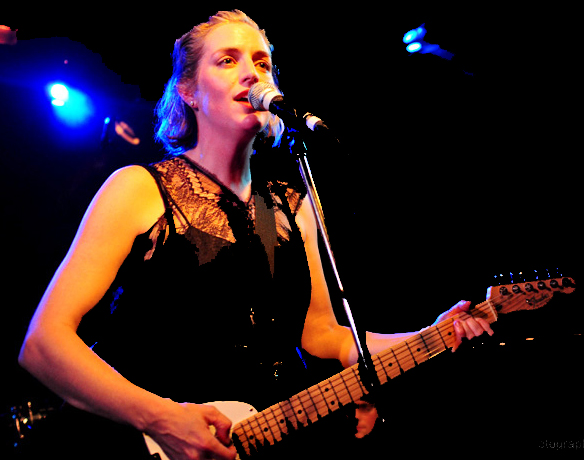
Sally Seltmann performing at Rosemount Hotel, Perth in July 2010.

== Track listing ==
1. "Harmony to My Heartbeat" – 3:55
2. "Set Me Free" – 3:35
3. "On the Borderline" – 4:01
4. "Book Song" – 3:21
5. "Dream About Changing" – 3:29
6. "Heart That's Pounding" – 3:28
7. "I Tossed a Coin" – 3:17
8. "Happy" – 3:15
9. "The Truth" – 3:30
10. "Sentimental Seeker" – 2:39
11. "5 Stars" – 3:01
12. "Dark Blue Angel" – 3:08

== Charts ==
Chart performance for Heart That's Pounding
Chart (2010)	Peak position
Australian Albums (ARIA)	73
