= She Will Have Her Way =

Compilation album by Various Artists
- Released: 26 September 2005
- Recorded: Various Times
- Genre: Pop, rock, folk, R&B, soul
- Length: 61:06 (Regular Edition); 123:20 (Special Edition)
- Label: Capitol; EMI

Various Artists chronology
She Will Have Her Way (2005)	He Will Have His Way (2010)

Alternative Cover
- Cover to the special edition version.

Professional ratings
Review scores
Source	Rating
FasterLouder	Favourable link
ABC	link

She Will Have Her Way is a compilation album featuring female Australian and New Zealand musicians performing songs written by Neil Finn and Tim Finn (The Finn Brothers), members of Split Enz and Crowded House. A follow-up album, He Will Have His Way, featuring male artists, was released in 2010.

== Background ==
The album takes its name from Neil Finn's single "She Will Have Her Way" from Try Whistling This, however the song does not appear on this album, nor does any other from Neil Finn's solo career. The album is a mixture of songs previously recorded for prior releases (such as "Better Be Home Soon") and some recorded specifically for the project ("Distant Sun," "Fall at Your Feet," "Stuff and Nonsense" etc.).

A special edition of the album was released with a second disc containing all of the original versions of the songs remastered. Its cover was slightly redesigned with a pale blue instead of a dark blue background and subtle, added background elements.

== Commercial performance ==
She Will Have Her Way peaked at #3 on the Australian Albums Chart and reached #4 in New Zealand. In total, it spent 15 weeks in the Australian top 40.

The album has sold over 350,000 copies.

== Differences to original versions ==
Some songs have distinct differences to the original versions, while some maintain the general feel of the original.

- In "Distant Sun," Fraser omits the bridge lyric "Like a Christian fearing vengeance from above," presumably due to her Christian faith.
- In "Six Months in a Leaky Boat," much of the song is omitted, particularly the lower tempo parts of the song.
- "Four Seasons" was originally entitled "Four Seasons In One Day."
- "I Hope I Never" is much slower.
- "Persuasion" is converted from a "natural" folk rock song into a "synthetic" pop-rock song, and changed the gender references to neutral as opposed to male (e.g. "I will always be a man who's open to persuasion" was changed to "I will always be someone who's open to persuasion").
- "Charlie" converted from a sombre ballad into an uptempo rock song.
- "Into Temptation" originally had the line "You and your new blue dress," however Geyer changed this line to "You and your deep blue eyes" and converted the rock ballad into an RnB-ballad instead.

== Track listing ==
=== Regular release ===
1. "Fall at Your Feet" – Clare Bowditch – 3:50
2. "Stuff and Nonsense" – Missy Higgins – 3:31
3. "I'll Never Know" – Goldenhorse – 3:04
4. "Into Temptation" – Renée Geyer – 4:56
5. "Six Months in a Leaky Boat" – Little Birdy – 3:53
6. "Better Be Home Soon" – Kasey Chambers – 3:19
7. "Distant Sun" – Brooke Fraser – 3:56
8. "Not the Girl You Think You Are" – Holly Throsby – 3:36
9. "I Hope I Never" – Lisa Miller – 4:09
10. "Don't Dream It's Over" – Sarah Blasko – 4:42
11. "One Step Ahead" – Amiel – 3:01
12. "Four Seasons" – New Buffalo – 4:00
13. "Won't Give In" – Sara Storer – 4:18
14. "Pineapple Head" – Natalie Imbruglia – 3:23
15. "Persuasion" – Stellar* – 3:41
16. "Charlie" – Sophie Koh – 3:47
17. "Message To My Girl" - Clare Bowditch – 4:12 (iTunes bonus track)

=== Special Edition disc two ===
All tracks are in the same sequence as disc one, however these are the original versions. These recordings were remastered for this release.

1. "Fall at Your Feet" – Crowded House – 3:20
2. "Stuff and Nonsense" – Split Enz – 4:24
3. "I'll Never Know" – Tim Finn – 3:06
4. "Into Temptation" – Crowded House – 4:35
5. "Six Months in a Leaky Boat" – Split Enz – 4:21
6. "Better Be Home Soon" – Crowded House – 3:08
7. "Distant Sun" – Crowded House – 3:51
8. "Not the Girl You Think You Are" – Crowded House – 4:08
9. "I Hope I Never" – Split Enz – 4:33
10. "Don't Dream It's Over" – Crowded House – 3:59
11. "One Step Ahead" – Split Enz – 2:53
12. "Four Seasons In One Day" – Crowded House – 2:50
13. "Won't Give In" – Finn Brothers – 4:16
14. "Pineapple Head" – Crowded House – 3:29
15. "Persuasion" – Tim Finn – 3:54
16. "Charlie" – Split Enz – 5:30

== Personnel ==
Adapted from AllMusic.

- Josh Cunningham - guitar, producer, vocals
- Nash Chambers - engineer, mixing, producer
- Martin Harrington - producer
- Missy Higgins - performer, primary artist, producer
- Ash Howes - mixing, producer
- Garth Porter - producer
- Sally Seltmann - engineer, producer
- David Skeet - mixing, producer
- Geoffrey Maddock - arranger, guitar, producer, vocals

== Charts ==
=== Weekly charts ===
Chart (2005–07)	Peak position
Australian Albums (ARIA)	3
New Zealand Albums (RMNZ)	4

=== Year-end charts ===
Chart (2005)	Position
Australia (ARIA) Albums Chart	36
New Zealand (RIANZ)	34
Chart (2006)	Position
Australia (ARIA) Albums Chart	43

== Certifications and sales ==
Region	Certification	Certified units/sales
Australia (ARIA)	2× Platinum	140,000^{^}
New Zealand (RMNZ)	Platinum	15,000^{^}
^{^} Shipments figures based on certification alone.
