= Via Tania =

American singer

- Also known as: Sunday
- Born: Tania May-Bowers; Australia
- Origin: Chicago, Illinois, United States
- Genres: Pop, electronic
- Occupations: Singer-songwriter, record producer
- Years active: 2000–present
- Labels: Chocolate Industries, Love + Mercy, Narooma
- Website: www.viatania.com

Tania May-Bowers, better known by her stage name Via Tania, is an Australian singer formerly based in Chicago, Illinois.

== Life and career ==
Via Tania originally started performing in Sydney during the 1990s with her sister Kim Bowers in noise outfit named Spdfgh. After relocating to Chicago at the end of the 1990s, Tania set about piecing together an album as Via Tania, with producer Casey Rice and various Chicago musical luminaries. Her first release "Dream Of" was through seminal Chicago record label Chocolate Industries in 2002. This was followed by a 12" vinyl release (also through Chocolate Industries) of "Lightning and Thunder" which was backed with a cover of New Order's "Temptation".

In 2003, Tania released her critically acclaimed full-length album "Under A Different Sky". The album featured artists like Prefuse 73, Casey Rice, Tortoise, Howe Gelb and Tim Kinsella. Pitchfork gave the album a glowing review and decreed "Via Tania will be a major contender". The album received coverage in CMJ and Venus Zine, and Tania was featured on the cover of Anthem Magazine. Tania played shows with artists such as Tortoise, Junior Boys, Lisa Germano, and My Brightest Diamond.

When returning to Australia, Tania met Texan producer Craig Ross, who has worked with many artists including Emmylou Harris, Daniel Johnston, patty griffin and Spoon and followed Craig to Austin to work on her new album "Moon Sweet Moon". While she was there she also performed at the Sxsw Music Festival in 2007.

"Moon Sweet Moon" was first released in 2007 by Australia record label Love & Mercy. The album was also released in Japan through Easel Recordings in the same year. The Japanese version featured an exclusive track, "Do You Believe". "Moon Sweet Moon" features contributions from an array of skilled players including members of Tortoise, Lara Meyerratken (El May & Ben Lee's band), Shearwater and Melbourne's Ground Components.

In Australia the album received great acclaim from community radio and was an "album of the week" at FBI, 2SER and 4ZZZ. Two singles were released off the album in Australia: "Our Wild Flight" (2007), which featured remixes by Mountains in The Sky; and "Become Forest" (2008), which featured remixes by Grafton Primary and J Nitti. Tania carried out two national Australian tours, one touring with Clare Bowditch in late 2007 and also the Laneways Festival in early 2008.

In 2009 Tania signed in the United States to New York/Paris based label The Hours in 2009, when she was subsequently released in the United States in October. The U.S. version of "Moon Sweet Moon" featured new artwork, a new track list and a new track called "Fields". The first single off "Moon Sweet Moon", "Wonder Stranger," was remixed by influential Warp artist Plaid.

Tania played at Sxsw in 2010, and she released the second single "Fields" in early 2010.

In 2013 had a fundraising campaign on Indiegogo for her upcoming album with the Tomorrow Music Orchestra (official release date Feb. 2015).

== Discography ==
=== Albums ===
- Under a Different Sky (2003)
- Moon Sweet Moon (2009)
- Via Tania and the Tomorrow Music Orchestra (2015)

=== EPs ===
- Dream Of... (2002)

=== Singles ===
- "Lightning & Thunder" (2002)
- "Boltanski" (2003)
- "True" (2005)
- "Wonder Stranger" (2009)
- "Fields" (2010)
