= Tangier (album) =

Studio album by Billy Thorpe
- Released: 2010
- Recorded: 2006–2007
- Studio: Electric Mountain Studios, Trackdown Digital, Studios 301, Point-Blank Sound, Lahaina Sound
- Label: Sony Music Australia
- Producer: Billy Thorpe, Daniel Denholm

Billy Thorpe chronology
Solo – The Last Recordings (2007)	Tangier (2010)

Tangier is a studio album by singer Billy Thorpe. Thorpe recorded material for the album between September and November 2006 and was working on the album when he died in Sydney in February 2007. The album was released in 2010 by Sony Music Australia.

At the ARIA Music Awards of 2011, the album won the ARIA Award for Best Adult Contemporary Album

== Track listing ==
1. "Marrakesh" – 4:54
2. "A River Knows" – 4:25
3. "Since You've Been Gone" – 5:28
4. "Gypsy" – 5:05
5. "Tangier" – 5:17
6. "Fatima" – 7:14
7. "Long Time" – 4:49
8. "In a New World" – 4:45
9. "We Will Be There" – 3:07
10. "Out of Here" – 4:41

== Charts ==
Chart performance for Tangier
Chart (2010)	Peak position
Australian Albums (ARIA)	14
