= Sophie Koh =

Australian musician

- Origin: Melbourne, Australia
- Genres: Alternative pop
- Instruments: Vocals, guitar, piano
- Years active: 2000–present
- Label: Independent (Crying Ninja Records)
- Website: sophiekoh.com

Sophie Koh is an Australian singer and songwriter.

== Biography ==
Born in New Zealand, Sophie Koh grew up both there and in Singapore. She got her LMusA (Licentiate in Music Australia, a diploma) when she was just 16 years old and spent her early years majoring in classical piano at the Melbourne Conservatory of Music. After finishing university in Melbourne, where she qualified as an optometrist, she headed to Darwin where she won Triple J's Unearthed contest.

She launched her debut album, All The Pretty Boys, in 2005. She released her follow-up album, All Shook Up, in 2008. The album was produced by J. Walker (Machine Translations). Her third album, Oh My Garden, was recorded in Los Angeles with producer Brad Wood (Liz Phair, Veruca Salt, Pete Yorn) and includes collaboration with Ben Lee. It was released in 2012.

In 2013, Sophie and band completed a major tour of China. Her music has featured on TV's Grey's Anatomy, Neighbours and Home and Away and in feature films such as The Loved Ones.

Koh's fourth studio album, Book Of Songs, was released in 2017. It features a handful of songs sung in Mandarin and is produced by J. Walker. This latest album sees her cross over into the indie-classical world.

== Achievements ==
Sophie Koh signed to In-Fidelity Recordings label after winning Triple J's Unearthed contest. She became a breakthrough female artist, reaching No 3 on Triple J's Net 50 and remaining in the chart for 8 consecutive weeks. Paul Hester played drums on her debut album, All the Pretty Boys.

In 2005, Koh appeared on Australian TV show RocKwiz performing her song "Anywhere" and singing a duet with Jimmy Little. They performed a The Turtles song, "Happy Together". In 2008, she appeared on RocKwiz again. This time, the counterpart guest musician was Steve Kilbey from The Church. They performed a cover of The Go Betweens' "Streets of Your Town".

Koh has supported The Eels, The Go-Betweens, Paul Kelly, Ember Swift, Pete Murray, Alex Lloyd, Paul Dempsey, Howie Day and Tim Freedman. She was The Go-Betweens' national support in 2006. Koh contributed a cover of the Split Enz song "Charlie" for the double platinum album She Will Have Her Way: the Songs of Tim & Neil Finn.

Koh's second album, All Shook Up, which was (produced by Greg J Walker (Machine Translations)), led her to win Best Female Artist at The Age EG 2008 Music Awards.

Koh appeared on Spicks and Specks, taking over co-hosting duties from Adam Hills for a section of the show. It was the most watched ABC TV show of 2009 The same year, Sophie had a cameo role on Neighbours, performing "Anywhere" with her live band in Charlie's Bar.

In 2011, Koh released her third studio album, Oh My Garden, with producer Brad Wood and musician Ben Lee. The video for Lo-Fi was ABC RAGE "Indie Clip of the Week" and InPress Street Mag's "Clip of the Year 2011". Lo-Fi was also voted into RAGE's Top 50 clips of 2011. She also launched her own independent label, Crying Ninja Records.

Koh is an awarded songwriter, winning Best Contemporary Song at Independent Music Awards (USA) for "I Understand". She was a top ten finalist in the International Songwriting Competition for "Lo-Fi". (Both songs were co-written with Ben Lee and Brad Wood.) She toured China for the first time in 2013 to rave reviews. Cities visited included Hong Kong, Shenzhen, Guangzhou, Changsha, Wuhan, Shanghai, Ningbo, Zaozhuang, Qufu, Beijing, Chengdu and Chongqing, and the tour was supported by Arts Victoria and ThisTownTouring.

In 2019, she was a finalist in the Melbourne Music Prize, Emerging Composer category.

== Discography ==
=== Albums ===
- All the Pretty Boys (2005)
- All Shook Up (2008)
- Oh My Garden (2012)
- Book of Songs (2017)

=== EPs and singles ===
- "Anywhere" (2005) No. 3 Triple J Net 50
- "Silly Thing" (2006) EP
- "Objects in This Mirror" (2008) single iTunes only
- "Lo-Fi" single (2011)
- "I Understand" single (2012)
- "One Thing Leads to Another" single (2014) – as heard on Grey's Anatomy 80's band The Fixx cover
- "Tiger Not the Hare" single (2017)

=== Compilations ===
- She Will Have Her Way: "Charlie" (2005)
- Like a Version 2: "Creep" (Radiohead) (2006)
- Lazy Sunday: "Silly Thing" (2006)
- Acoustic 2: "All The Pretty Boys" (2006)
- RocKwiz Two for the Show with Jimmy Little: "Happy Together" (2006) DVD

== Awards and nominations ==
=== Music Victoria Awards ===
The Music Victoria Awards are an annual awards night celebrating Victorian music. They commenced in 2006.

Year	Nominee / work	Award	Result	Ref.
2017	Book of Songs	Best Folk Roots Album	Nominated	
