= Seeker Lover Keeper (album) =

Studio album by Seeker Lover Keeper
- Released: 3 June 2011
- Genre: Indie rock
- Length: 46.33
- Label: Dew Process/Universal Music Australia

Seeker Lover Keeper chronology
Seeker Lover Keeper (2011)	Wild Seeds (2019)

Seeker Lover Keeper is the self-titled first album released by the Australian all-female trio, Seeker Lover Keeper, composed of solo singer-songwriters Sarah Blasko, Holly Throsby and Sally Seltmann. It was released in Australia on 3 June 2011. On 12 June 2011, the album debuted at No. 3 on the ARIA Albums Chart.

Prior to its release, the alternative youth radio station Triple J selected the album as their feature album of the week from 23 to 30 May. In addition to playing the tracks on air, the entire album was available for streaming from the Triple J website for that week.

Due to the group being made up of three solo artists, they chose to release three singles, each with an accompanying music video, that featured each individual band member as the lead singer. They were "Light All My Lights" (Blasko), "Even Though I'm a Woman" (Throsby) and "On My Own" (Seltmann).

== Track listing ==
1. "Bring Me Back" (written by: Blasko; lead vocals: Blasko)
2. "Light All My Lights" (written by: Throsby; lead vocals: Blasko)
3. "Even Though I'm a Woman" (written by: Seltmann; lead vocals: Throsby)
4. "Bridges Burned" (written by: Blasko; lead vocals: Blasko)
5. "On My Own" (written by: Blasko; lead vocals: Seltmann)
6. "Rely on Me" (written by: Throsby/Bree von Reyk; lead vocals: Blasko)
7. "Theme I" (written by: Blasko; lead vocals: Blasko)
8. "Every Time" (written by: Seltmann; lead vocals: Seltmann)
9. "We Will Know What It Is" (written by: Throsby; lead vocals: Throsby)
10. "If the Night Is Dark" (written by: Seltmann; lead vocals: Seltmann)
11. "Going to Sleep" (written by: Throsby; lead vocals: Throsby)
12. "Rest Your Head on My Shoulder" (written by: Seltmann)

== Charts ==
=== Weekly charts ===
Chart (2011)	Peak position
Australian Albums (ARIA)	3

=== Year-end charts ===
Chart (2011)	Position
Australian Albums (ARIA)	38

== Certifications ==
Region	Certification	Certified units/sales
Australia (ARIA)	Platinum	70,000^{‡}
^{‡} Sales+streaming figures based on certification alone.
