= Tony Dupé =

Australian music producer and musician

- Occupation: Musician
- Website: www.tonydupé.com

Tony Dupé is an Australian music producer and musician. He has also performed and released music under the name of Saddleback. Dupé has released four solo albums: Margaret Hammett Lived, Assembly, Everything's a Love Letter and Night Maps. In 2020 he released a collaborative album, the old capital with his partner, Claire Deak, on American label Lost Tribe Sound.

Known for his work with Holly Throsby, who he produced three albums for, Dupé has also worked with Piers Twomey, Jamie Hutchings, Bluebottle Kiss, Jack Ladder, SeaLifePark, Glovebox, Fergus Brown, The Woods, Grand Salvo, Lucy Roleff and many others.

Dupé composed the score to the ABC animated series The Gradual Demise of Phillipa Finch and the 2020 feature film Disclosure.

Until recently, Tony Dupé completed much of his recording work in a studio based on a rural property in the NSW Southern Highlands. The studio was a weatherboard cottage on located on Saddleback Mountain. He is now based in Melbourne after working in Berlin for a number of years.

Dupé is also an internationally recognised academic in songwriting and music production.

== Discography ==
- Everything's a Love Letter 2004 - Preservation/Inertia
- Night Maps 2007 - Preservation
- Everything's a Love Letter + Everything's Open to Interpretation [re-issue with reworks] 2010 - Preservation
- Assembly: Organ and Birds at Pella Desert Church 2019 - self released
- the old capital 2020 (with Claire Deak) - Lost Tribe Sound
- Everything's a Love Letter [re-mastered for vinyl] 2022 - Oscarson
- Margaret Hammett Lived 2021 - Lost Tribe Sound
