= Oh Mercy (band) =

Australian indie rock band

- Origin: Melbourne, Victoria, Australia
- Genre: Indie rock
- Years active: 2007–2018
- Labels: Casadeldisco; Shock; EMI Music Australia
- Past members: Alexander Gow; Eliza Lam; Rohan Sforcina; Simon Okely; Thomas Savage; Peter McDonald; Annabel Griggs; Cliff Bowden
- Website: ohmercy.com.au

Oh Mercy were an Australian indie rock band formed by Alexander Gow. The band released five studio albums, Privileged Woes (2009), Great Barrier Grief (2011), Deep Heat (2012), When We Talk About Love (2015) and Café Oblivion (2018).

At the ARIA Music Awards of 2015 they won Best Adult Contemporary Album for When We Talk About Love.

== History ==
Oh Mercy was an indie rock band, formed as a duo in Melbourne in 2006 by former De La Salle College students Alexander Gow on lead vocals and guitar, and Thomas Savage on lead vocals, piano and guitar. The band name is from Bob Dylan's September 1989 album of the same name. Their music has received high rotation on Australian national radio station, Triple J, since April 2007. Oh Mercy expanded to a quartet by 2008 with Eliza Lam on bass guitar and Peter McDonald on drums.

The quartet issued a six-track extended play, In the Nude for Love, in May 2009 which Electric Skeleton's reviewer noticed the group "make the kind of dreamy pop music that even your Grandmother would probably appreciate (although they drop the f-bomb in 'Seems Like a Good Idea', so unless you have a really cool granny, perhaps not). It is very easy to see why they’ve been compared to the likes of The Go-Betweens and Augie March." The reviewer listed the EP as one of the best of that year, "Aside from the brilliant title it has some great pop songs and two instrumentals." Two tracks, "Lay Everything on Me" and "Seemed Like a Good Idea", were issued as singles and were used to promote the group on Triple J and Triple R.

The four-piece released their debut album, Privileged Woes, on 24 August 2009 on the Casadeldisco label and distributed by Shock with Myles Wootton (of the Panics) producing. Gow and Savage co-wrote all the tracks. Gow explained the album's content and title, "I realised the problems we had were the problems of privilege. We started poking fun at ourselves. It set the theme for the record. We were 19 and middle class and whingeing about emotions and angst coming out of being that age." Privileged Woes peaked at No. 3 on the ARIA Hitseekers Albums chart a week after its appearance.

In 2009 Rohan Sforcina joined on drums, after the album had been recorded with McDonald. In 2010 Savage left the group and later reflected on his songwriting partnership with Gow, "We'd show each other what we'd done that week and it would be like a friendly competition. It was great for early development." He had left after touring with the group for 18 months to return to Australia and pursued a solo singer-songwriter career. Gow remembered "Tom had flagged with everybody that he wanted to move on at some stage. It wasn't a big surprise for us. He was really not interested in the touring lifestyle." Simon Okely (ex-The Preytells) joined on guitar.

Their first three albums were each a featured album on Triple J.

The project is presumed to have ceased when lead Alex Gow changed the Facebook page for the band over to his new solo project, Perfect Moment, in April 2020.

== Discography ==
=== Studio albums ===
Title	Details	Peak chart positions
Title	Details	AUS
Privileged Woes	Released: 24 August 2009; Label: Casadeldisco (CASA013); Format: CD, digital download	— (Note: Privileged Woes did not enter the ARIA top 100, but peaked at number 3 on the ARIA Hitseekers Albums.)
Great Barrier Grief	Released: March 2011; Label: Casadeldisco (CASA021); Format: CD, digital download	13
Deep Heat	Released: August 2012; Label: Casadeldisco (CASAO22); Format: CD, digital download, LP	21
When We Talk About Love	Released: 2015; Label: Casadeldisco (4725363); Format: CD, digital download, LP	28
Café Oblivion	Released: 9 March 2018; Label: Casadeldisco (6733900); Format: CD, digital download, LP	—

=== Extended plays ===
Title	Details
Expats & Eczema	Released: 2007; Label: Liberation; Format: CD
In the Nude for Love	Released: May 2009; Label: Casadeldisco (CASA011); Format: CD, digital download

=== Charted singles ===
List of charted singles, with selected chart positions
Title	Year	Peak chart positions	Album
Title	Year	AUS Phy.	Album
"Keith St."	2010	5	Great Barrier Grief

== Awards and nominations ==
=== AIR Awards ===
The Australian Independent Record Awards (commonly known informally as AIR Awards) is an annual awards night to recognise, promote and celebrate the success of Australia's Independent Music sector.

Year	Nominee / work	Award	Result
2009	Oh Mercy	Breakthrough Independent Artist	Nominated
2012	"Drums"	Best Independent Single/EP	Nominated

=== AMP Award ===
The Australian Music Prize (The AMP) is an annual award of $30,000 given to an Australian band or solo artist in recognition of the merit of an album released during the year of award. The award made by Australian Music Prize Ltd, a sole-purpose entity sponsored by a variety of music industry figures and record companies. The AMP was established in 2005.

Year	Nominee / work	Award	Result
2009	Kid Sam	Australian Music Prize	Nominated

=== ARIA Music Awards ===
The ARIA Music Awards are an annual series of ceremonies celebrating the local industry, presented by the Australian Recording Industry Association (ARIA), since 1987. Oh Mercy have won one trophy from five final nominations.

Year	Nominee / work	Award	Result
2011	Great Barrier Grief	Breakthrough Artist – Album	Nominated
2011	Great Barrier Grief – Ken Done	Best Cover Art	Nominated
2012	Deep Heat	Best Rock Album	Nominated
2012	Deep Heat – Rennie Ellis	Best Cover Art	Nominated
2015	When We Talk About Love	Best Adult Contemporary Album	Won

=== EG Awards / Music Victoria Awards ===
The EG Awards (known as Music Victoria Awards since 2013) are an annual awards night celebrating Victorian music. They commenced in 2006.

Year	Nominee / work	Award	Result
2012	Oh Mercy	Best Band	Nominated
2012	"Drums"	Best Song	Nominated
2012	Deep Heat	Best Album	Nominated
2012	Oh Mercy	Outstanding Achievement	Won

=== J Award ===
The J Awards are an annual series of Australian music awards that were established by the Australian Broadcasting Corporation's youth-focused radio station Triple J. They commenced in 2005.

Year	Nominee / work	Award	Result
2009	Privileged Woes	Australian Album of the Year	Nominated
2012	Deep Heat	Australian Album of the Year	Nominated

== Band members ==
- Alexander Gow – lead vocals, guitar, piano (2006–present)
- Thom Savage – lead vocals, piano, guitar (2006–10)
- Peter McDonald – drums (2008–09)
- Eliza Lam – bass guitar (2008–present)
- Rohan Sforcina – drums (2009–present)
- Simon Okely – lead guitar
- Annabel Griggs (touring keys)
- Cliff Bowden (touring guitar)

== See also ==
- Music of Melbourne
- Music of Australia
- Australian Independent Record Labels Association (AIR)
