= Dreaming: The Videos =

Video by Crowded House
- Released: 2002
- Genre: Rock; Pop
- Length: 106 Minutes
- Label: Capitol

Crowded House chronology
| I Like to Watch (1994) | Dreaming: The Videos (2002) | Farewell to the World (2006) |

Professional ratings
Review scores
| Source | Rating |
|---|---|
| Amazon.com | 4/5 stars |

Dreaming: The Videos is a music video compilation DVD of songs by rock group Crowded House, released in 2002. It includes twenty-one of their music videos from 1986 to 1996, but excludes "Instinct" from their greatest hits album Recurring Dream, and "Fingers of Love" from Together Alone. In 1987, New Zealand television show Catch 22 interviewed Crowded House while on tour. This interview, at 26 minutes long, is featured with live footage and scenes from all of the music videos until that point edited throughout the interview. The front cover of the DVD features the 1992–1994 (the Together Alone era) lineup of Crowded House featuring Neil Finn, Nick Seymour, Mark Hart and Paul Hester. The rear of the DVD features the prior lineup from 1991 to 1992 (the Woodface era) which did not include Mark Hart, however featured Neil Finn's elder brother Tim Finn. Unlike Recurring Dream, Dreaming follows closer to the chronological releases of all of the singles, the only difference to original release being that "Everything Is Good for You" was released before "Not the Girl You Think You Are" and "Chocolate Cake" was released before "Fall at Your Feet" and "It's Only Natural". The DVD also features a live performance of fan favourite "Sister Madly", as there was no music video ever made of the song. The band also made a promo video for 'Instinct' but it was not included in the compilation as a consequence of the band reportedly disliking it.

== Track listing ==
1. "Mean to Me"
2. "Now We're Getting Somewhere"
3. "Don't Dream It's Over"
4. "Something So Strong"
5. "World Where You Live"
6. "Better Be Home Soon"
7. "Sister Madly" (Live at The State Theatre)
8. "When You Come"
9. "Into Temptation"
10. "I Feel Possessed"
11. "It's Only Natural"
12. "Chocolate Cake"
13. "Fall at Your Feet"
14. "Weather with You"
15. "Four Seasons in One Day"
16. "Distant Sun"
17. "Nails in My Feet"
18. "Locked Out"
19. "Private Universe"
20. "Not the Girl You Think You Are"
21. "Everything Is Good for You"
  Special Features
22. Catch 22 Interview
