= I Like to Watch (Crowded House video) =

Video by Crowded House
- Released: 16 November 1992
- Length: 60 minutes
- Label: PMI
- Producer: Andrew Vogel

I Like to Watch is a music video collection by the band Crowded House, which was released in 1992 on video only. The collection features 13 promotional music videos for the singles from the band's first three albums along with three short documentary features on the band.

== History ==
The cover artwork for the collection is by bassist Nick Seymour and features elements from the cover of the album Temple of Low Men.

== Track listing ==
| No. | Title | Length |
|---|---|---|
| 1. | "On the Road With Crowded House" | 3:10 |
| 2. | "Don't Dream It's Over" | 3:43 |
| 3. | "Mean to Me" | 4:45 |
| 4. | "Now We're Getting Somewhere" | 4:06 |
| 5. | "Something So Strong" | 2:59 |
| 6. | "World Where You Live" | 3:04 |
| 7. | "Backstage With Crowded House" | 3:14 |
| 8. | "When You Come" | 4:44 |
| 9. | "Into Temptation" | 4:31 |
| 10. | "Better Be Home Soon" | 3:17 |
| 11. | "Crowded House Q+A" | 2:51 |
| 12. | "Chocolate Cake" | 4:02 |
| 13. | "Fall at Your Feet" | 3:16 |
| 14. | "It's Only Natural" | 3:38 |
| 15. | "Weather with You" | 3:46 |
| 16. | "Four Seasons in One Day" | 2:54 |

== Charts ==
=== Weekly charts ===
| Chart (1992) | Position |
|---|---|
| UK Video Charts | 14 |
