= Spring Break '87 =

- Directed by: Scott Fishman
- Produced by: Rich Zelachowski
- Starring: Neil Finn; Nick Seymour; Paul Hester; Eddie Rayner
- Music by: Crowded House
- Distributed by: MTV
- Release date: July 1987
- Running time: 60 minutes
- Country: United States
- Language: English

Spring Break '87 is a 1987 concert performed by Australian rock group Crowded House at Daytona Beach, Florida, United States.

The concert was recorded and released by MTV for the United States, and featured all of Crowded House's singles that had been released up to that point. It also featured a small handful of songs from the then forthcoming album Temple of Low Men, such as "When You Come" and "Better Be Home Soon". Crowded House also played two songs by Split Enz, and a cover of the Hunters & Collectors hit song "Throw Your Arms Around Me".

== Personnel ==
- Neil Finn – vocals, guitars
- Nick Seymour – Bass guitar, backing vocals
- Paul Hester – Drums, vocals
- Eddie Rayner – Keyboards, piano

== Track listing ==
All written by Neil Finn unless otherwise noted.

1. "This Is Massive" (Paul Hester)
2. "When You Come"
3. "Mean to Me"
4. "World Where You Live"
5. "That's What I Call Love"
6. "One Step Ahead"
7. "Recurring Dream" (Craig Hooper, Nick Seymour, Finn, Hester)
8. "Something So Strong" (Finn, Mitchell Froom)
9. "Hole in the River" (Finn, Eddie Rayner)
10. "Don't Dream It's Over"
11. "Now We're Getting Somewhere"
12. "Throw Your Arms Around Me" (Mark Seymour)
13. "Better Be Home Soon"
