= Instinct (song) =

1996 single by Crowded House

Single by Crowded House

from the album Recurring Dream
- Released: 10 June 1996
- Length: 3:09
- Label: Capitol
- Songwriter: Neil Finn
- Producers: Mitchell Froom; Neil Finn; Tchad Blake

Crowded House singles chronology
"Everything Is Good for You" (1996)	"Instinct" (1996)	"Not the Girl You Think You Are" (1996)

"Instinct" is a 1996 single by rock band Crowded House. It was the first single released from the group's greatest hits compilation Recurring Dream in the United Kingdom, and the third and final release in Australia. It was a top-20 hit in New Zealand and the UK, peaking at number 17 and number 12, respectively. In Australia, "Instinct" peaked at number 90 on the ARIA Singles Chart in March 1997, spending two non-consecutive weeks in the top 100.

The band members reportedly hated the music video for the song, which features two female aliens and a living golden statue; thus, it was omitted from the compilation DVD Dreaming: The Videos.

== Track listings ==
"Instinct" was released as a two CD set available separately. Disc one in a double case; disc two in a sleeve ready to insert the disc into the case with disc one. "Recurring Dream" originally from the film Tequila Sunrise and later released on Crowded House rarities album Afterglow. "In the Lowlands" originally from Temple of Low Men. "Chocolate Cake" features the Beatles song "Rocky Raccoon" as its intro. All songs written by Neil Finn unless otherwise indicated.

UK CD1

1. "Instinct"
2. "Recurring Dream" (Remix from Tequila Sunrise soundtrack) (Craig Hooper, Neil Finn, Nick Seymour, Paul Hester)
3. "Weather with You" (N. Finn, Tim Finn) (live)
4. "Chocolate Cake" ("Rocky Raccoon": John Lennon, Paul McCartney; "Chocolate Cake": N. Finn, T. Finn) (live)

UK CD2

1. "Instinct" (alternative mix)
2. "World Where You Live" (live)
3. "In the Lowlands" (live)
4. "Into Temptation" (live)

== Charts ==
Chart (1996–1997)	Peak position
Australia (ARIA)	90
Canada Top Singles (RPM)	68
Canada Adult Contemporary (RPM)	27
Europe (Eurochart Hot 100)	71
Israel (IBA)	10
New Zealand (Recorded Music NZ)	17
Scottish Singles Sales (Official Charts)	7
UK Singles (Official Charts)	12
