= Classic Masters (Crowded House album) =

Compilation album by Crowded House
- Released: 24 June 2003
- Genre: Pop rock, alternative rock
- Label: Capitol
- Producer: Mitchell Froom, Neil Finn and Tchad Blake

Crowded House chronology
Afterglow (1999)	Classic Masters (2003)	Farewell to the World (2006)

Classic Masters is a compilation album of songs by rock group Crowded House, released in 2003.

This album was only released to the American market and focuses more on songs that were popular in America than the songs on the international release Recurring Dream: The Very Best of Crowded House.

== Critical reception ==
AllMusic writer Stephen Thomas Erlewine criticized that the compilation album contained such a large percentage of obscure singles, album songs, and rare tracks. Erlewine said the collection, "while listenable, is far from their classic work, and pales dramatically in comparison to Recurring Dream." Gregg Shapiro of Windy City Times was more favorable, stating that the collection was worthwhile thanks to the album's two live recordings, "When You Come" and "Sister Madly".

== Track listing ==
All songs were written by Neil Finn, except where noted.

1. "Something So Strong" (N. Finn, Mitchell Froom) – 2:52
2. "Weather with You" (N. Finn, Tim Finn) – 3:44
3. "When You Come" (Live) – 5:47*
4. "Don't Dream It's Over" – 3:55
5. "Fingers of Love" - 4:26
6. "Nails in My Feet" - 3:39
7. "Never Be the Same" - 4:28
8. "Chocolate Cake" (N. Finn, T. Finn) - 4:02
9. "It's Only Natural" (N. Finn, T. Finn) – 3:32
10. "Distant Sun" (Remix) – 3:50*
11. "Sister Madly" (Live) - 2:57*
12. "Hole in the River" (N. Finn, Eddie Rayner) - 3:56

Note

- *Not available on other albums
