= Beautiful (The Reels album) =

Studio album by The Reels
- Released: 9 May 1982
- Recorded: Late 1981–early 1982
- Studio: Albert Studios
- Genre: Synthpop
- Length: 36:45
- Label: K-Tel, RCA; Liberation Music (reissue)
- Producer: The Reels; B.C. Brown

The Reels chronology
Quasimodo's Dream (1981)	Beautiful (1982)	Neighbors (1988)

Beautiful is the third studio album by The Reels and was released in 1982 by special licence on the budget-priced K-tel label. The album was subsequently released on CD through RCA (BPCD5038). The Reels had just split in two, following the recent shock departures of bass player Paul Abrahams and keyboardist Karen Ansell (lead keyboardist Colin Newman had previously left in mid '81), forcing remaining members David Mason, Craig Hooper and Stephan Fidock to work out other concepts; eventually, they decided to shuffle on as a trio and use a tape recorder for live work. Nonetheless, Beautiful was the Reels' most successful album to date, mainly covering Middle of the Road classics with a synthesiser feel. The single taken from it, "This Guy's in Love With You" gave the Reels their biggest hit in Australia, peaking at number 7 around November 1982. The album was later certified gold. In 2012 it was remastered and reissued on Compact Disc by Liberation Music.

== Track listing ==
Side One

1. "This Guy's in Love with You" (Bacharach-David) - 4:34
2. "Where Is the Love?" (MacDonald-Salter) - 2:03
3. "La Mer" (Trenet) - 3:18
4. "Cry" (Mason-Fidock) - 3:16
5. "(Last Night) I Didn't Get to Sleep at All" (Tony Macaulay) - 3:16
6. "Prefab Heart" (Mason) - 3:18 (Note: A slow-paced version different from that on the first album)

Side Two

1. "True Love" (Porter) - 2:25
2. "茶山姑娘" (Electric & Musical Industries Ltd.) – 2:27
3. "Science Is Golden" (Mason) - 2:44
4. "He'll Have to Go" (Allison-Allison) - 2:39
5. "The Last Waltz" (Mason-Reed) - 3:17
6. "Return" (Mason-Hooper) - 4:16

== Charts ==
Chart (1982–1983)	Peak position
Australia (Kent Music Report)	32
