= Quasimodo's Dream (song) =

Single by The Reels

from the album Quasimodo's Dream
- A-side: "Quasimodo's Dream"
- B-side: "(Love Is) Here Today"
- Released: May 1981; December 1983 (re-release)
- Recorded: 1980–1981 at Albert Studios
- Genre: Pop, new wave
- Length: 4:06
- Label: Polygram, Mercury
- Songwriter(s): David Mason
- Producer(s): The Reels

The Reels singles chronology
"Shout and Deliver" / "Depression" (1981)	"Quasimodo's Dream" (1981)	"No. 3" / "Haunted" (1981)

The Reels singles chronology
""Happiness" / "Comedy"" (1983)	"Quasimodo's Dream" (1983)	""It Must Be Love" / "My Family"" (1985)

"Quasimodo's Dream" is a song by Australian pop/new wave band The Reels and was released as the title single off their second album, Quasimodo's Dream in May 1981. The album peaked at No. 27 on the Australian Kent Music Report Albums Chart but the single did not reach the Top 50 of the related Singles Chart. Rock music historian, Ian McFarlane claimed, "the album's highlight was the sparse, evocative title track". The song, written by lead singer Dave Mason, is now regarded as a classic—in 2001 it was named by Australasian Performing Right Association (APRA) at No. 10 of their Top 30 Australian songs of all time. It was covered by fellow Australians Kate Ceberano (1989) and Jimmy Little (1999).

== Background ==
The Reels were formed in 1979 in Sydney and signed with the Australian branch of Mercury Records, with the line-up of Paul Abrahams on bass guitar, John Bliss on drums, Craig Hooper on lead guitar and synthesiser, Dave Mason on vocals, and Colin Newham on keyboards, saxophone and guitar. They released their debut single, "Love Will Find a Way" in October, which peaked into the top 40 of the Australian Kent Music Report Singles Chart. Their self-titled debut album, The Reels, produced by Mark Opitz (The Angels, Cold Chisel) had appeared in November. With the follow-up single, "Prefab Heart" also appearing in November, combined with the band's distinctive image, they gained increasing attention with their music videos featured on the influential national ABC TV pop show Countdown from early 1980. In February, The Reels were joined by another keyboardist, Karen Ansel (ex-Romantics), and released their third single, "After the News" in July. It marked a transition in their music—their songs took on a more serious lyrical tone—they dispensed with guitars, by using synthesisers as their main instruments.

"Shout and Deliver" was released in March 1981, ahead of their second album, Quasimodo's Dream, in May, which peaked at No. 27 on the Australian Kent Music Report Albums Chart. The title single, "Quasimodo's Dream", followed but did not reach the Top 50 of the related Singles Chart. Australian rock music historian, Ian McFarlane claimed, "the album's highlight was the sparse, evocative title track". In 1983 the band travelled to the United States and United Kingdom, and released a five track EP, Pitt Street Farmers and followed with an updated version of "Quasimodo's Dream" in December, which demonstrated the band's faith in the song, although it failed to chart on its second release. At this point Mason was forced to give up performing after contracting hepatitis, which effectively ended the group.

The song's writer, Mason, concedes that the "whole lyric just doesn't make sense". In March 2011, while performing the song on RocKwiz, Mason says, "... And of course you know that Quasimodo, wanted to marry Gazelda [sic], and live in a nice little house with three children, and a picket fence; And I never want to be, in Quasimodo's dream. No sir."

== Reception ==
The song became acknowledged as a classic, and in 2001, it was named by Australasian Performing Right Association (APRA) at No. 10 of their Top 30 Australian songs of all time. Music journalist, Toby Creswell, described the song in his 2005 book, 1001 Songs as being "a grim but beautiful tale of alienation and self-hatred".

Junkee said, "A twisted, stalking song, it might be one of the strangest singles to gain popularity in Australia. Songwriter and vocalist Dave Mason spins his story of alienation and self-loathing over a spacious and unsettling backing, the instrumentation sounding like it was dropped from the top of an aircraft hangar."

== Cover versions ==
"Quasimodo's Dream" was covered by Kate Ceberano on her album, Brave (1989); by The Blackeyed Susans' Robert Snarski for the Triple R-FM compilation, RRRewind in the Chapel (February 1999); and by Jimmy Little on Messenger (June 1999). Subsequently it was covered by Glenn Richards of Augie March on national radio, Triple J's segment "Like a Version" in October 2010. Another variety was arranged and performed by Tripod and Eddie Perfect (performing together as "Perfect Tripod") together with Gotye as a special download and vinyl release in March 2013 to support the Save Live Australian Music campaign on Pledge Music. "Quasimodo's Dream" was interpreted by Tim Rogers with a music video by Sandpit to coincide with the theatrical release of an Australian feature film, The Boy Castaways (2013). Singer / songwriter Rob Dougan released a cover of the track on his "The Life of the World to Come" EP in February 2019, including both vocal and instrumental versions.

== Track listing ==
1. "Quasimodo's Dream" (David Mason) – 4:06
2. "(Love Is) Here Today" (Brian Wilson/Tony Asher) credited on the record label as Brian Wilson/Peter Asher – 3:39
