= Crowded House (album) =

Studio album by Crowded House
- Released: 1 August 1986
- Studios: Sunset Sound (Los Angeles); Capitol (Hollywood); Platinum (Melbourne)
- Genres: Pop rock; alternative rock; new wave
- Length: 38:40
- Labels: Capitol; EMI
- Producer: Mitchell Froom

Crowded House chronology
Crowded House (1986)	Temple of Low Men (1988)

Singles from Crowded House
- 1. "Mean to Me" Released: June 1986; 2. "World Where You Live" Released: July 1986; 3. "Now We're Getting Somewhere" Released: September 1986; 4. "Don't Dream It's Over" Released: October 1986; 5. "Something So Strong" Released: April 1987

Professional ratings
Review scores
Source	Rating
AllMusic	3.5/5 stars
Encyclopedia of Popular Music	4/5 stars
The Rolling Stone Album Guide	4/5 stars
The Village Voice	C+

Crowded House is the debut studio album by Australian/New Zealand rock band Crowded House, released in August 1986 by Capitol Records. Produced by Mitchell Froom, it includes the international hit single "Don't Dream It's Over", as well as the singles "Mean to Me", "World Where You Live", "Now We're Getting Somewhere", and "Something So Strong".

Crowded House was certified platinum in four countries and won Best Debut Album at the 1986 Countdown Australian Music Awards. In December 2021, the album was listed at no. 7 in Rolling Stone Australia's "200 Greatest Albums of All Time" countdown.

== History ==
After the breakup of Split Enz in 1984, Neil Finn and drummer Paul Hester decided to form a new band. Bass player Nick Seymour approached Finn during the after party for the Melbourne show of the Split Enz farewell tour and asked if he could try out for the new band. Former Swingers and soon-to-be Midnight Oil bass player Bones Hillman was also a candidate, but it was Seymour's playing on the demo for "That's What I Call Love" that earned him the spot. The group, then named The Mullanes, also included the Reels guitarist Craig Hooper, who left the band before they signed with Capitol Records. Capitol rejected the name "The Mullanes", as well as alternatives such as "Largest Living Things". The name "Crowded House" was adopted after the trio flew to Los Angeles to record the album and were provided with a very cramped apartment to live in.

The album's rhythm tracks were recorded by Larry Hirsh at Capitol Recording Studios, Los Angeles. The remaining recording sessions for the album were at Sunset Sound studios, where the group first collaborated with engineer Tchad Blake who also worked on the next two Crowded House albums. The album was mixed by Michael Frondelli at Studio 55. Seymour and Hester do not appear on "Now We're Getting Somewhere", which was recorded early in the sessions with drummer Jim Keltner and bass player Jerry Scheff.

The original New Zealand and Australia release of the album featured ten tracks; however, when the album was being prepared for export it was decided to include Crowded House's version of the Split Enz song "I Walk Away". At the same time the track listing was re-ordered and the song "Can't Carry On" was dropped from the album. After the release of the band's second album, Temple of Low Men, EMI re-released Crowded House internationally, using the original Australian/New Zealand track listing but with "I Walk Away" included too. This is now considered the "standard" track listing of for the album. A DualDisc version of this album was made available in 2005. The DVD side features a DVD-A version of the album with lyrics, a discography and the music videos for "Don't Dream It's Over" and "Something So Strong".

Original copies of the CD in Australia and New Zealand were made in Japan, but after the Disctronics B plant at Braeside was opened in March 1987, the album began to be manufactured there.

== Track listing ==
All tracks are written by Neil Finn, except where noted.

No.	Title	Writer(s)	Length
1.	"Mean to Me"		3:15
2.	"World Where You Live"		3:07
3.	"Now We're Getting Somewhere"		4:09
4.	"Don't Dream It's Over"		3:56
5.	"Love You 'Til the Day I Die"		3:31
6.	"Something So Strong"	Finn, Mitchell Froom	2:51
7.	"Hole in the River"	Finn, Eddie Rayner	4:02
8.	"Can't Carry On"		3:57
9.	"I Walk Away"		3:06
10.	"Tombstone"		3:30
11.	"That's What I Call Love"	Finn, Paul Hester	3:39

Note

- The original release of the album in Australia and New Zealand featured "Can't Carry On" as track 8. This song was replaced by a re-recording of the Split Enz song "I Walk Away" for other markets. Later re-issues of the album include both songs with the listing extended to 11 tracks, as above. EMI re-releases also have World Where You Live as the opening track, and Mean To Me as track 4.

=== 2016 deluxe edition ===
==== Disc 1 (original album) ====
All tracks are written by Neil Finn, except where noted.

No.	Title	Length
1.	"Mean to Me"	3:15
2.	"World Where You Live"	3:07
3.	"Now We're Getting Somewhere"	4:09
4.	"Don't Dream It's Over"	3:56
5.	"Love You 'Til the Day I Die"	3:31
6.	"Something So Strong" (Finn, Mitchell Froom)	2:51
7.	"Hole in the River" (Finn, Eddie Rayner)	4:02
8.	"Can't Carry On"	3:57
9.	"I Walk Away*"	3:31
10.	"Tombstone"	3:30
11.	"That's What I Call Love" (Finn, Paul Hester)	3:39

==== Disc 2 (unreleased and rare material) ====
All tracks are written by Neil Finn, except where noted.

No.	Title	Length
1.	"Something So Strong (Home Demo)" (Finn, Mitchell Froom)	1:22
2.	"Hole in the River (Studio Demo)" (Finn, Eddie Rayner, Paul Hester)	4:06
3.	"Love You 'til the Day I Die (Home Demo)"	0:54
4.	"That's What I Call Love (Studio Demo)" (Hester, Finn)	3:35
5.	"Can't Carry On (Studio Demo)"	3:35
6.	"Walking on the Pier (Studio Demo)"	3:20
7.	"Does Anyone Here Understand my Girlfriend (Studio Demo)" (Hester)	3:23
8.	"Oblivion (Studio Demo)"	3:36
9.	"Walking on the Spot (Studio Demo)"	3:44
10.	"Something So Strong (Studio Demo)" (Finn, Froom)	2:12
11.	"Now We're Getting Somewhere (Studio Demo)"	4:32
12.	"Stranger Underneath Your Skin (Home Demo)"	2:49
13.	"Don't Dream It's Over (Home Demo)"	3:15
14.	"Left Hand (Live)"	4:23
15.	"Grabbing by the Handful (Live)" (Finn, Hester, Craig Hooper, Nick Seymour)	3:33
16.	"World Where You Live (writing demo)"	1:17
17.	"Recurring Dream (original version) *" (Finn, Hester, Hooper, Seymour)	2:59

== Personnel ==
Personnel taken from Crowded House liner notes.

Crowded House

- Neil Finn – guitar, piano, lead vocals
- Nick Seymour – bass guitar
- Paul Hester – drums, backing vocals

Additional musicians

- Mitchell Froom – keyboards
- Tim Pierce – guitar
- Jerry Scheff – bass ("Now We're Getting Somewhere")
- Jim Keltner – drums ("Now We're Getting Somewhere")
- Jorge Bermudez – percussion
- Heart Attack Horns – horns
- Noel Crombie – backing vocals
- Jim Gilstrap – backing vocals
- Andy Milton – backing vocals
- Joe Satriani – backing vocals

Production

- Mitchell Froom – producer (1–7, 9, 10)
- Eddie Rayner – producer (8)
- Neil Finn – producer (8)
- Tchad Blake – engineer (1–7, 9, 10)
- Dennis Kirk – engineer (1–7, 9, 10)
- Chris Corr – engineer (8)
- Kaj Dahlstrom – engineer (8)
- Steve Himelfarb – assistant engineer (1–7, 9, 10)
- Larry Hirsh – rhythm track recording
- Michael Frondelli – mixing
- Glen Golguin – mix assistant
- Wally Traugott – mastering
- John O'Brien – art direction
- Nick Seymour – design, cover painting
- Dennis Keeley – photography

== Charts ==
=== Weekly charts ===
1986–87 weekly chart performance for Crowded House
Chart (1986–92)	Peak position
Australian Albums (Kent Music Report)	1
Canada Top Albums/CDs (RPM)	8
Dutch Albums (Album Top 100)	20
German Albums (Offizielle Top 100)	44
New Zealand Albums (RMNZ)	3
UK Albums (Official Charts)	99
US Billboard 200	12

=== Year-end charts ===
1987 year-end performance for Crowded House
Chart (1987)	Position
Canada Top Albums/CDs (RPM)	20
New Zealand Albums (RMNZ)	7
United States (Billboard 200)	31

== Certifications ==
Region	Certification	Certified units/sales
Australia (ARIA)	6× Platinum	420,000^{^}
Canada (Music Canada)	Platinum	100,000^{^}
New Zealand (RMNZ)	2× Platinum	30,000^{‡}
United Kingdom (BPI)	Silver	60,000^{*}
United States (RIAA)	Platinum	1,000,000^{^}
^{*} Sales figures based on certification alone.^{^} Shipments figures based on certification alone.^{‡} Sales+streaming figures based on certification alone.
