= Spring break (disambiguation) =

Spring break is a secular holiday.

Spring break may also refer to:

== In film ==
- Spring Break (film), a 1983 comedy film
- Spring Breakers (2013), an American neo-noir film

== In music ==
- "Spring Break", a Cheap Trick song from the 1983 film of the same name
- Spring Break (album) – College Boyys album
- Spring Break '87, a 1987 concert performed by Australian rock group Crowded House at Daytona Beach, Florida, United States
- "Spring Breakers", a 2024 song by Charli XCX from the deluxe version of Brat

== In television ==
- "Spring Break" (CSI: Miami), a 2003 episode of the TV series CSI: Miami
- "Spring Break" (Modern Family), a 2015 episode of the TV series Modern Family
- "Spring Break" (South Park), a 2023 episode of the Comedy Central animated TV series South Park
- Spring Break (Vice Principals), an episode of the American TV series Vice Principals

== See also ==
- Spring brake, a component of an air brake (road vehicle), a braking system for vehicles
