= Chocolate cake (disambiguation) =

Chocolate cake is a dessert cake made using chocolate.

Chocolate cake may also refer to:

- Chocolate Cake (song), a song by Crowded House

== See also ==
- Chocolate
- My Friend the Chocolate Cake, a musical group
