= Dave Mason (Australian musician) =

Australian singer-songwriter

- Born: David Lawrence Mason ca. 1954 (age 71–72); Dubbo, New South Wales, Australia
- Genres: Rock, indie pop
- Occupations: Singer, songwriter, record producer
- Instruments: Keyboard, vocals
- Years active: 1976–present
- Label: Liberation

David Lawrence Mason (born c. 1954) is an Australian singer-songwriter and record producer originally from Dubbo. He is the founding mainstay of pop, rock group, The Reels. For the group, Mason wrote and sang their hit singles, "Love Will Find a Way" (October 1979), "Prefab Heart" (1980), "After the News" (July 1980), and "Shout and Deliver" (March 1981). He also wrote "Quasimodo's Dream", which was a non-charting single from May 1981. However, in May 2001, it was listed by Australasian Performing Right Association (APRA) at No. 10 of their Top 30 Australian songs of all time.

== Early life ==
Mason was born in Dubbo where he was raised. His mother, Lorna "Meg" (née Boxsell), married his father John Marsden Mason in March 1953 with whom they have a daughter and four sons.

John was a Methodist Minister and, from 1965 to 1981, the Liberal member for the electoral district of Dubbo in the New South Wales state parliament and leader of the state Liberal party between 1978-1981. This, coincidentally, was to be the period of his son's greatest prominence as an artist.

== Career ==
In 1976, Mason, on lead vocals, formed Native Sons with John Bliss (ex-Thundaband) on drums, and Craig Hooper on lead guitar and synthesiser. They played cover versions of popular music and, when Colin Newham (ex-Condfederate) joined on keyboards, saxophone and guitar, they changed their name to The Brucelanders. In 1978 they moved to Sydney and Paul Abrahams joined on bass guitar.

By 1979 they were renamed "The Reels", with the line-up consisting of Mason, Abrahams, Bliss, Hooper and Newham. The group released their debut single, "Love Will Find a Way", in October, which placed in the top 40 of the Australian Kent Music Report Singles Chart. Mason wrote the song and it was followed by the release of their self-titled album in the next month—the album was co-produced by the band members and Mark Opitz (The Angels, AC/DC). Mason wrote or co-wrote 13 of the album's 14 tracks. His brother Paul was a member of The Reels' road crew.

Mason also wrote and sang the subsequent charting Reels songs "Prefab Heart" (1980) and "After the News" (July 1980). With Newham, he co-produced the group's debut EP, Five Great Gift Ideas from The Reels (November 1980). He also wrote "Quasimodo's Dream", which was a non-charting single from May 1981 remixed and reissued in 1983. The song was the title track from the Reels' second album, at which time they had added Karen Ansel to their line-up. Their third album, Beautiful, was a radical change in direction towards slower, arguably 'easy listening' music; for this record, and the subsequent Pitt Street Farmers EP, they were a three-piece of Mason, Hooper and Stefan Fidock. The group broke up after this release, reforming with most of its original line-up in 1985, releasing five singles and another album, Neighbors.

In December 1988, Mason appeared in the Australian feature film Ghosts... of the Civil Dead, which co-starred Nick Cave. In May the following year Lot's Wife reviewer G Kavarnoj described Mason's role as "notable for his portrayal of Lilly, a man whose dalliance with transvestism merely emphasises the sexual despair of the caged men". Cinelogue's Matthew Mesaros described the character as "a long-haired man with a feminine frame who copes with prison life by assuming the role of a cross-dressing prostitute".

While "Quasimodo's Dream" may not have been a chart hit, it continued to have currency, recorded by Kate Ceberano, Jimmy Little and others. In May 2001 it was listed at No. 10 by Australasian Performing Right Association (APRA) in their Top 30 Australian songs of all time. The Reels had long disbanded by this time, breaking up in 1992.

In April 2003, Mason guested in a duet entitled "Blue Black Sky" for David Bridie's second solo album, Hotel Radio. In Bernard Zuel's review for the Sydney Morning Herald, he notes that the album has "stuff to revel in the gorgeous 'The Tender Trap' and the richness of his duet with Dave Mason, 'Blue Black Sky'".

In April 2007, Mason released Reelsville, a solo album of acoustic versions of tracks from The Reels' back catalogue. Guy Blackman of The Age described the album as "a quiet triumph, avoiding the obvious cliches of the genre in favour of imaginative arrangements and unexpected instrumentation". He followed the album with an appearance on the Countdown Spectacular 2 Tour, from August to September 2007.

In 2008, The Reels reformed, with Mason joined by Bliss and Newham, and they performed in Melbourne and Sydney. The following year, Abrahams rejoined and Newham departed, and it was this line-up that performed in Brisbane during the same year. On 26 March 2011, Mason appeared on "Episode 108" of celebrity music quiz RocKwiz, on SBS TV, performed "Quasimodo's Dream", and a duet with fellow guest Sally Seltmann—a cover of the Conway Twitty 1974 single "As Soon as I Hang Up the Phone"—ended the episode. Writing for the Sydney Morning Herald, Greg Hassall stated that Mason had "a few problems with pitch", although his solo effort "could be burped and still sound good".

In September 2012, Mason gigged with Reel Big Dog, a band that included Bliss, Peter O'Doherty and his brother Reg Mombassa (both ex-Mental As Anything, Dog Trumpet), and Brendan Gallagher of Karma County. In June 2013, Mason performed at the Sydney Opera House in the Art of Music concert, which also included appearances by Tim Finn, Katie Noonan, O'Doherty and Mombassa, Suze DeMarchi, Dave Leslie, Josh Pyke, Ian Moss, Iva Davies, and Dragon. Art of Music was organised by Jenny Morris for her charity, Nordoff-Robbins' Music Therapy Australia.

In April 2015, Mason performed guest vocals on "Not Even Jesus", the final track on Paul Mac's album Holiday From Me.

=== Personal life ===
In late 1983, Mason was forced to give up performing after contracting hepatitis, which was one of the reasons The Reels went into hiatus. Upon his recovery in August 1985, the group reconvened and continued until disbanding in 1992. From about 1995 to 1997, Mason spent three years confined to his bedroom and was subsequently diagnosed with major depression. As part of his ongoing treatment, he was encouraged by his psychiatrist to return to performing and recording music.

== Awards and nominations ==
=== Countdown Australian Music Awards ===
Countdown was an Australian pop music TV series on national broadcaster ABC-TV from 1974 to 1987, it presented music awards from 1979 to 1987, initially in conjunction with magazine TV Week. The TV Week / Countdown Awards were a combination of popular-voted and peer-voted awards.

Year	Nominee / work	Award	Result
1986	"Bad Moon Rising"	Best Performance in a Video	Nominated
