= Paul Abrahams =

Paul Abrahams may refer to:

- Paul Abrahams (footballer) (born 1973), English footballer
- Paul Abrahams (musician) (born 1958), Australian musician

== See also ==
- Paul Abraham (1892–1960), Jewish-Hungarian composer of operettas
