= Neighbors (album) =

Studio album by the Reels
- Released: December 1988
- Genre: Rock; indie pop
- Length: 40:03
- Label: Festival
- Producer: Dave Mason; Craig Hooper; Bruce Brown

The Reels chronology
Beautiful (1982)	Neighbors (1988)	Requiem (1992)

Neighbors is the Reels fourth studio album and was released in 1988 on Regular Records through Festival Records. It consists of cover versions of classic Australian songs by well-known artists and was produced by Dave Mason, Craig Hooper and Bruce Brown. It was recorded at Festival Studios and Alberts Digital Studios, Sydney, Australia, and mixed at Alberts Digital Studios. To promote the album's release, the band enlisted the help of Rolf Harris to narrate The Story of The Reels, a 40-minute promotional cassette supplied to radio stations.

Reviewed in the Sydney Morning Herald at the time of its release, it was described as "far from the best thing The Reels have produced. The Reels are either unaware their own material is in demand, or they could not care less what the public wants to hear."

== Track listing ==
No.	Title	Writer(s)	Length
1.	"Working Class Man"	J. Cain	2:23
2.	"Are You Old Enough"	P. Hewson	2:41
3.	"Forever Now"	S. Prestwich	3:28
4.	"I Started a Joke"	B. R. & M. Gibb	3:46
5.	"I Walk Away"	N. Finn	3:16
6.	"My Aim Is to Please You"	K. Young	3:12
7.	"Eagle Rock"	R. Wilson	2:50
8.	"Original Sin"	M. Hutchence / A. Farris	5:47
9.	"Pleasure and Pain"	M. Chapman / H. Knight	2:42
10.	"Shout and Deliver"	D. Mason	2:03
11.	"The Real Thing"	J.Young / D. Mason	2:38
12.	"Living in a Child's Dream"	M. Bower	3:08
13.	"Skippy (The Bush Kangaroo)"	E. Jupp	2:08

== Charts ==
Chart (1988)	Peak position
Australian Albums (ARIA Charts)	92
