= Five Great Gift Ideas from The Reels =

Five Great Gift Ideas from the Reels

EP by The Reels
- Released: November 1980
- Recorded: 1980 at Albert Studios
- Genre: Synthpop, new wave
- Length: 14:53
- Label: Mercury
- Producer: Colin Newham, David Mason

The Reels chronology
| The Reels (1979) | Five Great Gift Ideas from the Reels (1980) | Quasimodo's Dream (1981) |

Five Great Gift Ideas from the Reels is an extended play released by Australian band the Reels in November 1980. It was released during the recording sessions for the band's album Quasimodo's Dream. The EP consisted of 5 tracks: 4 covers and 1 original. It charted at #12 in Australia and was certified gold. "According to My Heart", a cover of the 1961 Jim Reeves song was also controversially included on their album Quasimodo's Dream.

The EP was produced by Bruce Brown and Russell Dunlop, featured mainly covers, including Jim Reeves' "According to My Heart", and Freda Payne's "Band of Gold". "Neon Rainbow" was a song made popular by the Box Tops. "According to My Heart" featured a folksy music video filmed at the farm of Australian country music star Smokey Dawson.

The EP did, however, have one original; "The Bombs Dropped on Xmas", co-written by Mason, Newham and Ansel

Engineer Tony Cohen later said, "They were gentle, decent people and we got along well. The Reels didn't try to do anything shocking, they just puttered along in their own way. They thought it was a joke to hire the punk rock dude to record beautiful sounds.

== Track listing ==
Side One

1. "You Got Soul" (Johnny Nash) - 3:03
2. "Neon Rainbow" (Thompson) - 3:00

Side Two

1. "The Bombs Dropped on Xmas" (Mason-Newham-Ansel) - 3:13
2. "According to My Heart" (Jim Reeves) - 3:12
3. "Band of Gold" (Wayne-Dunbar) - 2:25

== Charts ==
=== Weekly charts ===
Weekly chart performance for Five Great Gift Ideas from The Reels
| Chart (1981) | Peak position |
|---|---|
| Australia (Kent Music Report) | 12 |

=== Year-end charts ===
Year-end chart performance for Five Great Gift Ideas from The Reels
| Chart (1981) | Position |
|---|---|
| Australia (Kent Music Report) | 94 |
