= After the News =

Single by The Reels

from the album Quasimodo's Dream
- B-side: "Media Themes"
- Released: July 1980
- Recorded: 1980 at Albert Studios
- Genre: Pop, new wave
- Length: 2:46
- Label: Mercury, Polygram
- Songwriter(s): David Mason
- Producer(s): The Reels

The Reels singles chronology
"According to My Heart" / "Love Will Find a Way" (1980)	"After the News" / "Media Themes" (1980)	"Shout and Deliver" / "Depression" (1981)

"After the News" was a song by The Reels that was released as a single from their second album Quasimodo's Dream in July 1980. The song fared disappointingly on the charts, peaking at number 65 in Australia. The single was accompanied by a colourful video that features a puppet newsreader. The B-side, "Media Themes", consisted of three short songs that were later re-used for the album. A "sequel" for "Media Themes" was released as a B-side to the band's later single "Love Grows (Where My Rosemary Goes)".

Mason later said, "I got really pissed off about "After the News". People were just not accepting what we were doing. I got depressed about that."

== Track listing ==
1. "After the News" – 2:46
2. "Media Themes" – 3:42
