= I Feel Possessed =

Single by Crowded House

from the album Temple of Low Men
- Released: 29 January 1990
- Recorded: Capitol Recording Studios; Sunset Sound Factory, Los Angeles
- Genre: Rock, pop
- Length: 3:47
- Label: Capitol
- Songwriter(s): Neil Finn
- Producer(s): Mitchell Froom

Crowded House singles chronology
"Sister Madly" (1989)	"I Feel Possessed" (1990)	"Chocolate Cake" (1991)

"I Feel Possessed" is a rock song written by Neil Finn and performed by Australian band Crowded House for their album Temple of Low Men. The song was the final single released from the album. The song later appeared on the group's greatest hits collection Recurring Dream.

== Track listing ==
All live performances feature Roger McGuinn of The Byrds (the union was named "ByrdHouse"). Recorded at the Pantages Theatre, Los Angeles 7 April 1989. All other tracks from the album "The Temple of Low Men".

=== Standard 7" vinyl ===
Released in Germany and Australia.

1. "I Feel Possessed" - 3:47
2. "Mr. Tambourine Man" - 2:35 (live)

=== Canada 7" vinyl ===
1. "I Feel Possessed" - 3:47
2. "Into Temptation" - 4:33

=== Standard EP ===
Released as 12" in Germany. Released as CD in US and Germany.

1. "I Feel Possessed" - 3:47
2. "Mr. Tambourine Man" - 2:35 (live)
3. "Eight Miles High" - 4:50 (live)
4. "So You Want to Be a Rock 'n' Roll Star" 2:49 (live)

== Personnel ==
- Neil Finn - Vocals and guitar
- Nick Seymour - Bass guitar
- Paul Hester - Drums and backing vocals
- Mitchell Froom - Keyboards

== Charts ==
Chart (1990)	Peak position
Australia (ARIA)	93
