= This Guy's in Love with You =

1967 Burt Bacharach and Hal David song

Single by Herb Alpert

from the album The Beat of the Brass
- B-side: "A Quiet Tear" (from The Lonely Bull)
- Released: May 1968
- Recorded: April 1968
- Genre: Traditional pop, easy listening
- Length: 3:55
- Label: A&M
- Songwriters: Burt Bacharach, Hal David
- Producers: Herb Alpert, Jerry Moss

Herb Alpert singles chronology
"Slick" (1968)	"This Guy's in Love with You" (1968)	"My Favorite Things" (1968)

"This Guy's in Love with You" is a hit song written by Burt Bacharach and Hal David and released by Herb Alpert in May, 1968. Although known primarily for his trumpet playing as the leader of the Tijuana Brass, Alpert sang lead vocals on this solo recording, which was arranged by Bacharach. An earlier recording of the song by British singer Danny Williams with different lyrics titled "That Guy's in Love" appeared on Williams' 1968 self-titled album. Alpert's version was a number one hit in the U.S., Canada and Australia.

== History ==
"This Guy's in Love with You" was written and published in 1967, but was not released commercially that year. There are differing accounts from Hal David and Herb Alpert regarding the original title of the song and its lyrical storyline.

Quoting Hal David regarding the modifications the original lyric, done for Herb Alpert, historian Robin Platts wrote that the original title was "That Guy's in Love" and told the story of an unfaithful lover:

[Alpert] wanted to do that song on a TV special he was doing...It was a song he was going to sing to his wife. And [the original lyric] was not quite appropriate for what he wanted to say. He asked us whether we could change [the lyric] so it would fit what he needed. And I did.

Bacharach and David first copyrighted the song as "That Guy's in Love" on June 15, 1967. In early 1968, singer Danny Williams released the song in the U.K. as "That Guy's in Love with You" on his Deram Records LP Danny Williams, with the lyric about a man who suspects his partner is cheating on him. That recording was not released as a single in the U.K. (and was not released at all in the U.S.), and did not make the U.S. or U.K. music charts.

The song received a new copyright registration (citing significant changes) on April 15, 1968, as "This Guy's in Love with You" which was a week before Alpert appeared in a pre-recorded music video singing the song on his TV special The Beat of the Brass. In May 1968, Herb Alpert released his single "This Guy's in Love with You" with the revised lyrics. After Alpert's recording became a #1 hit on the U.S. Billboard Hot 100 chart, several versions by well-known female artists were released under the title "This Girl's in Love with You", shifting the title and perspective of the song yet again. Those artists included Dionne Warwick, Dusty Springfield, Aretha Franklin, Petula Clark, Ella Fitzgerald, Connie Francis, and Diana Ross & The Supremes.

Alpert, quoted in Bacharach's 2013 memoir Anyone Who Had a Heart, had a different recollection of the original title from Hal David. Alpert told an interviewer that the song first came to him as "This Girl's in Love with You". He explained: "There’s a question I always ask great writers that I asked Burt that day over the phone. 'Is there a song you have tucked away in your drawer or someplace or a song that didn’t get the right recording that you find yourself whistling in the shower?' And he sent me 'This Girl’s in Love with You.' I called Hal David in New York and asked him if he wouldn’t mind changing the gender."

== Herb Alpert version ==
Alpert recognized in the song qualities that made it a good fit for himself as a singer and trumpet player. The composition had a recognizable Bacharach-David feel, a spot for a signature horn solo in the bridge and in the fadeout, and it was an easy song to sing for singers like Alpert with a limited vocal range.

Alpert's filmed version of "This Guy's in Love with You" appeared on April 22, 1968 as a part of his CBS television special The Beat of the Brass. In the film, which has a studio recording of the song as its soundtrack, Alpert can be seen walking around in various natural environments in Malibu, California (including a woodland and a beach), singing the song to his wife Sharon. In response to numerous viewer telephone calls to the network following the broadcast, Alpert decided that the song should be released as a single recording.

Alpert's commercially-released recording featured a slightly different vocal performance than the one used as the film soundtrack in the television special. His single reached No. 1 on the U.S. Billboard Hot 100 pop singles chart in June of that year, remaining in the top position for four weeks. It was not only Alpert's first No. 1 single, but it was also the first No. 1 single for his A&M record label, as well as the first No. 1 in the U.S. for Bacharach & David. The song also spent ten weeks at No. 1 on the Easy Listening chart. For the single's B-side, Alpert chose "A Quiet Tear" from his first album in 1962, The Lonely Bull.

The single achieved sales of over 50,000 copies in Australia, being eligible for the award of a Gold Disc.

=== Charts ===
==== Weekly charts ====
Chart (1968)	Peak position
Argentina	20
Australia (Go-Set)	1
Canada RPM Top Singles	1
Ireland (IRMA)	8
Netherlands (Single Top 100)	13
New Zealand (Listener)	15
South Africa (Springbok)	2
UK Singles Chart (Official Charts Company)	3
US Billboard Hot 100	1
US Billboard Easy Listening	1
US Cashbox Top 100 Singles	1
US Record World Top Non-Rock	1

==== Year-end charts ====
Chart (1968)	Rank
Australia (Kent Music Report)	11
Canada	8
UK	22
US Billboard Hot 100	7
US Cash Box	9

==== All-time charts ====
Chart (1958-2018)	Position
US Billboard Hot 100	466

== Certifications ==
Certifications for "This Guy's in Love with You"
Region	Certification	Certified units/sales
United States (RIAA)	Gold	1,000,000^{^}
^{^} Shipments figures based on certification alone.

== Dionne Warwick version ==
"This Girl's in Love with You"

Single by Dionne Warwick

from the album Promises, Promises
- B-side: "Dream Sweet Dreamer"
- Released: 1969
- Recorded: 1968
- Studio: A & R Studios, NYC
- Genre: Pop; R&B
- Length: 4:13
- Label: Scepter
- Songwriters: Burt Bacharach; Hal David
- Producers: Bacharach; David

Dionne Warwick singles chronology
"Promises, Promises" (1968)	"This Girl's in Love with You" (1969)	"Odds and Ends" (1969)

Dionne Warwick's recording of "This Girl's in Love with You" was first released in November of 1968 on the Promises, Promises LP, and then released as a single in 1969. This version reached No. 7 in the U.S. in 1969, and also spent four weeks at No. 2 on the Easy Listening chart. It ranked as the 64th biggest US hit of 1969.

== Track listing and formats ==
- US 7" Vinyl

A. "This Girl's in Love with You" – 4:14
B. "Dream Sweet Dreamer" – 3:24

== Credits ==
- Engineer [Audio] – Phil Ramone
- Arranger – Don Sebesky
- Producer – Bacharach, David

=== Charts ===
==== Weekly charts ====
Chart (1969)	Peak position
Australia (Kent Music Report)	17
Australia (Go-Set)	19
Canada RPM Top Singles	7
Canada RPM Adult Contemporary	6
U.S. Billboard Hot 100	7
U.S. Billboard Easy Listening	2
U.S. Billboard R&B Singles	7
U.S. Cash Box Top 100	9

==== Year-end charts ====
Chart (1969)	Rank
Canada	91
U.S. Billboard Hot 100	64

== Other renditions ==
Nancy Sinatra debuted the female-protagonist version of the lyrics ("This Girl's in Love with You") live on The Ed Sullivan Show on May 26, 1968.

Eydie Gormé's recording was titled "This Girl's in Love with You" with a female lyric line as well. Critics believed that her rendition had "much of the feel and flavor of the initial hit". It was first released as a single in July 1968 and reached number 22 on the U.S. Easy Listening chart in the summer of 1968. The song was also included on her November 1968 LP Eydie.

Guitarist Tony Mottola also reached number 22 on the U.S. Easy Listening chart in the summer of 1968 with his instrumental version of the song. It was his only single to reach the chart. Mottola's recording was included on his Warm, Wild and Wonderful LP.

Australian group the Reels released a version as a single and on the album Beautiful in 1982. It reached No. 7 on the Australian charts and was the 90th biggest selling single in 1982 in Australia.

On 29 June 1996 at the London Festival Hall, Noel Gallagher of Oasis sang a version of the song with Bacharach playing piano; the following weekend it was aired on BBC Radio 2.

== Bibliography ==
- The Billboard Book of Top 40 Hits, 6th Edition, 1996
