= The Beat of the Brass =

Studio album by Herb Alpert & the Tijuana Brass
- Released: June 1968
- Recorded: 1968
- Studios: Gold Star (Hollywood, California)
- Genres: Easy listening, jazz pop
- Length: 31:51
- Labels: A&M; A&M SP4146
- Producers: Herb Alpert, Jerry Moss

Herb Alpert & the Tijuana Brass chronology
Herb Alpert's Ninth (1967)	The Beat of the Brass (1968)	Christmas Album (1968)

Singles from The Beat of the Brass
- 1. "This Guy's in Love With You" Released: May 1968

The Beat of the Brass is the tenth album by Herb Alpert & the Tijuana Brass, released in 1968. It was the last album by the Tijuana Brass to be released in both mono (LP 146) and stereo (SP 4146) versions; all albums afterward would be released in stereo only.

== Background ==
The album was released as a companion to the April 22, 1968 CBS television special by the same title. Tom Mankiewicz, who wrote the special, also provided two paragraphs of liner notes for the album. Explaining the concept behind the album, Mankiewicz writes, "The beat of America is more than a musical experience. It finds its pulse and rhythms in the very life of the country: the crack of a bat against a baseball, the spinning wheels and pounding machinery of a modern factory, a swinging crowd in New Orleans at Mardi Gras, a saddle twisting desperately against his rider..."

The album includes Alpert's only major vocal hit, "This Guy's in Love with You", which became an overnight success following its inclusion during the special in a sequence featuring Alpert and his then-wife Sharon. The song became the group's first No. 1 hit on the Billboard Hot 100 chart, reaching the top spot on June 22, 1968, and remaining there for four consecutive weeks. Alpert would not reach the top of the singles chart again until 1979's "Rise". The other track from The Beat of the Brass to reach the Billboard Hot 100 was "Cabaret", which peaked at No. 72 in May 1968.

The album was reissued on CD by Shout! Factory on August 16, 2005. It was reissued on CD and through various download services by Alpert's own label, Herb Alpert Presents, in September 2016.

== Critical reception ==
Professional ratings
Review scores
Source	Rating
Allmusic	2.5/5 stars

In his review for Allmusic, music critic Richard S. Ginell wrote the album had a nostalgic quality and wrote, "the tunes by John Pisano and Sol Lake are exquisite, and Alpert's arrangements of songs like "Thanks for the Memory" seem autumnal in quality, as if an era were about to close. The band still has the ability to groove."

== Track listing ==
=== Side 1 ===
1. "Monday, Monday" (John Phillips, Michelle Phillips) - 3:08
2. "A Beautiful Friend" (Sol Lake) - 3:16
3. "Cabaret" (Fred Ebb, John Kander) - 2:38
4. "Panama" (Julius Wechter) - 3:36
5. "Belz Mein Shtetele Belz (My Home Town)" (Jacob Jacobs, Alex Olshanetsky) - 2:14
6. "Talk to the Animals" (Leslie Bricusse) - 2:14

=== Side 2 ===
1. "Slick" (Herb Alpert, John Pisano) - 3:29
2. "She Touched Me" (Sol Lake) - 2:58
3. "Thanks for the Memory" (Leo Robin, Ralph Rainger) - 2:05
4. "The Robin" (John Pisano) - 2:22
5. "This Guy's in Love with You" (Burt Bacharach, Hal David; arranged by Burt Bacharach) - 3:55
  Some album labels indicate "Vocal by Herb Alpert"

== Chart positions ==
Chart (1968–1969)	Peak position
Argentina Chart	10
Canada Top Albums/CDs (RPM)	21
German Albums (Offizielle Top 100)	23
Norwegian Albums (VG-lista)	8
Billboard Pop Albums (Billboard 200)	1
US Record World 100 Top LP's	1
US Cash Box Top LP's	1
