= Quasimodo's Dream =

Studio album by The Reels
- Released: May 1981
- Recorded: 1980–1981 at Albert Studios
- Genre: New wave
- Length: 37:41
- Label: Mercury Records, Polygram Records
- Producer: Reel Production

The Reels chronology
Five Great Gift Ideas From The Reels (1980)	Quasimodo's Dream (1981)	Beautiful (1982)

Singles from Quasimodo's Dream
- 1. "After the News" Released: July 1980; 2. "Shout and Deliver" Released: March 1981; 3. "Quasimodo's Dream" Released: May 1981

Alternative cover
- "Quasimodo's Dream" back cover

Quasimodo's Dream is the second album by Australian group The Reels, released in May 1981 by Polygram Records. It is considered to be the band's best work and contains the iconic title track, which was voted as number 10 on APRA's list of Top 30 Australian songs. Other singles from the album include "After the News" and "Shout and Deliver". The song "According to My Heart", a cover of the 1961 Jim Reeves song had been included on the album against the wishes of the band, as a result of this, there was a sticker on the inner sleeve that said "Due to Record Company Pressure This Album Contains The Hit Single According To My Heart".

Quasimodo's Dream peaked in at number 27 on the Australian chart.

In October 2010, it was listed in the top 40 in the book, 100 Best Australian Albums.

In October 2011, the album was finally reissued on CD by Liberation Records in what was the 30th anniversary of its release. This had a different track listing and combined the three "Media Themes" instrumentals into one track.

== Track listing ==
Side one

1. "For All We Know" (David Lawrence Mason)
2. "Quasimodo's Dream" (D. Mason)
3. "According to My Heart" (G. Walker)
4. "After the News" (D. Mason)
5. "Colourful Clothes" (D. Mason/C. Hooper)
6. "Shout and Deliver" (D. Mason)

Side two

1. "Dubbo Go Go" (D. Mason)
2. "Smokey Dawson Show" (D. Mason)
3. "Depression" (D. Mason)
4. "Rupert Murdoch" (D. Mason/C. Newham)
5. "Kitchen Man" (D. Mason/C. Newham)
6. "Ohira Tour" (D. Mason/K. Ansell/C. Hooper)
7. "Cancer" (D. Mason/C. Hooper)

=== CD Reissue ===
1. "Quasimodo's Dream" – 4:10
2. "Shout and Deliver" – 2:43
3. "After the News" – 2:52
4. "According to My Heart" – 3:14
5. "Depression" – 3:04
6. "Colourful Clothes" – 2:24
7. "For All We Know" – 2:35
8. "Media Themes - Smokey Dawson Show/Rupert Murdoch/Ohira Tour" – 3:45
9. "Cancer" – 3:33
10. "Dubbo Go Go" – 5:34
11. "Kitchen Man" – 5:27

== Charts ==
Chart (1981)	Peak position
Australia (Kent Music Report)	27
