= The Reels (album) =

Studio album by The Reels
- Released: Nov. 1979
- Genres: New wave, pop, electronic
- Length: 40:42 (US version); 46:06 (Australian version)
- Labels: Polydor, Polygram
- Producers: Mark Opitz, The Reels

The Reels chronology
The Reels (1979)	Five Great Gift Ideas From The Reels (1980)

Singles from The Reels
- 1. "Love Will Find a Way / Spot the Ridge" Released: 1979; 2. "Prefab Heart / Misused, Abused" Released: 1979

The Reels is the self-titled debut album by Australian band The Reels, released in 1979. It was produced by Mark Opitz who also produced albums for Cold Chisel and The Angels. 2 editions of the album were released, the Australian one (on Mercury Records) having 14 tracks. The American release (on Polydor) omitted 2 tracks and had a rearranged track listing. The single "Love Will Find a Way" was the group's first well-known song, charting in the top 40 in Australia.

In June 2008, Missing Link Records owner and country musician, Keith Glass, told The Sydney Morning Herald that his favourite Australian album of the previous 50 years was The Reels: "[they] changed my life. From the first night I saw them on Countdown and went to the gig straight afterwards, they enchanted me. So clever, so cutting and quite XTC now I look back on it. The jerky new wave sounds and the image took me in from day one".

== Track listing ==
US version
Side one

1. "Plastic Pop" - 2:07
2. "Baby's in the Know" - 3:04
3. "Love Will Find a Way" - 3:14
4. "Don't Get Me Wrong" - 4:50
5. "Wonder Why" - 3:24
6. "Misused, Abused" - 3:47

Side two

1. "Prefab Heart" - 3:07
2. "Spot the Ridge" - 3:56
3. "Apathy" - 3:06
4. "Go Away" - 3:08
5. "The Meeting" - 4:24
6. "Livalafaway" - 2:35

Australian version
Side one

1. "Livalafaway" - 2:35
2. "Don't Get Me Wrong" - 4:46
3. "Love Will Find a Way" - 3:13
4. "Plastic Pop" - 2:07
5. "Apathy" - 3:06
6. "Wonder Why" - 3:24
7. "Misused, Abused" - 3:47

Side two

1. "Spot the Ridge" - 3:57
2. "Go Away" - 3:08
3. "Prefab Heart" - 3:08
4. "Baby's in the Know" - 3:05
5. "Bopper" - 2:45
6. "The Meeting" - 4:21
7. "(Yet I) Feel Like Dancing" - 2:44

== Charts ==
Chart (1979/80)	Peak position
Australia (Kent Music Report)	81
