= Shout and Deliver =

Single by The Reels

from the album Quasimodo's Dream
- B-side: "Depression"
- Released: March 1981
- Recorded: 1980 – 1981 at Albert Studios
- Genre: Pop, new wave
- Length: 2:42
- Label: Polygram
- Songwriter(s): David Mason
- Producer(s): The Reels

The Reels singles chronology
"After the News" / "Media Themes" (1980)	"Shout and Deliver" (1981)	"Quasimodo's Dream" / "(Love Is) Here Today" (1981)

"Shout and Deliver" is a song by The Reels, which was released as a single from their second album Quasimodo's Dream in March of 1981. The single peaked at number 43 on the Australian charts.

Reviewed at the time of release, Roadrunner described the song as "another steaming slice of mutated pop from the most under-rated band in the land. Consists of a six-line chorus sung a number of times over a heavy drumbeat and lazy keyboard pattern. Annoying insistent and very clever."

== Track listing ==
1. Shout and Deliver – 2:42
2. Depression – 3:01
