= Sister Madly =

Single by Crowded House

from the album Temple of Low Men
- Released: August 1988 (UK); January 1989 (New Zealand); 10 April 1989 (Australia)
- Recorded: 1987
- Genre: Rock
- Label: Capitol
- Songwriter(s): Neil Finn
- Producer(s): Mitchell Froom

Crowded House singles chronology
"Into Temptation" (1988)	"Sister Madly" (1988)	"I Feel Possessed" (1988)

"Sister Madly" is a 1988 song by rock group Crowded House. It was released as the third single from the group's second album Temple of Low Men in New Zealand, and as the fourth single from the album in Australia.

The song contains a solo by guitarist Richard Thompson.

This song was featured in the movie The Sum of Us with New Zealand actor Russell Crowe as he is jogging at the beginning of the film.

== Live versions ==
A live version of the song later appeared on Crowded House's Special Edition Live Album that accompanied selected copies of the group's greatest hits compilation Recurring Dream, however it was not included on the main compilation. This performance goes over 6 minutes long because the group lost the beat, had to stop, made jokes about how they would not remember the incident in the next 5 minutes and to compensate, Neil Finn started improvising lyrics.

It was also performed at the group's farewell concert Farewell to the World. On that version, Neil Finn states during the introduction, "This is a song about waking up in a room with my sister having nightmares!".

== Reception ==
Junkee said, "Seymour executes a career-best walking bassline, and the trio’s three-part harmonies are impeccable. Of particular note, however, is once again Hester’s jazz brushes – somehow, he always knew just how to make a snare drum positively sizzle."

== Track listings ==
All songs by Neil Finn except "Something So Strong" by Finn and Mitchell Froom. All tracks from the album "Temple of Low Men" except "Something So Strong" recorded live at King Biscuit Flower Hour, The Trocadero, Philadelphia, 24 March 1987...

=== UK 7" vinyl ===
1. "Sister Madly" – 2:52
2. "Mansion in the Slums" – 3:46

=== Australian 7" vinyl ===
1. "Sister Madly" – 2:52
2. "Love This Life" – 3:35

=== CD single and 12" vinyl ===
Released in UK.

1. "Sister Madly" – 2:52
2. "Mansion in the Slums" – 3:46
3. "Something So Strong" - 4:02 (live at King Biscuit Flower Hour, The Trocadero, Philadelphia, 24 March 1987)

== Chart performance ==
Chart (198)	Peak position
Australia (ARIA)	66
New Zealand (Recorded Music NZ)	26

== Release history ==
Region	Date
United Kingdom	August 1988
New Zealand	January 1989
Australia	April 1989
