= The Reels =

Australian rock band

- Origin: Dubbo, New South Wales, Australia
- Genres: Rock, indie pop, new wave
- Years active: 1976–1991, 2007–present
- Labels: Mercury, RCA, K-tel, Regular
- Past members: Karen Ansel; Craig Hooper; Stefan Fidock; Colin "Polly" Newham; Dave Mason; John Bliss; Paul Abrahams

The Reels are an Australian rock band which formed in Dubbo, New South Wales in 1976. They disbanded in 1991, and reformed in 2007. The band's 1981 song "Quasimodo's Dream" was voted one of the top 10 Australian songs of all time by a 100-member panel from Australasian Performing Right Association (APRA) in 2001. The Reels had mainstream chart success with covers of Herb Alpert's "This Guy's in Love with You" (No. 7, 1982) and Creedence Clearwater Revival's "Bad Moon Rising" (No. 11, 1986). Rock music historian Ian McFarlane described the group as "one of the most original and invigorating pop bands to emerge from the Australian new wave movement of the late 1970s."

== Career ==
=== 1976–1980: Early years ===
Native Sons, consisting of John Bliss on drums, Craig Hooper on lead guitar and synthesiser, and Dave Mason on vocals, formed in the regional centre of Dubbo, New South Wales in 1976. Mason is the son of NSW parliamentarian, John Mason, who was the state's opposition Liberal Party leader during 1978–1981. Colin (Polly) Newham (keyboards/brass) from Orange, N.S.W. joined in 1977.

Native Sons played in the Dubbo/Orange/Newcastle area for two years, with a repertoire of cover versions and original songs. After moving to Sydney in 1978, the band added Paul Abrahams on bass guitar and changed its name to The Brucelanders. It developed an original repertoire of fast-paced, quirky pop and ska, and its energetic performances gained it a following on the east coast live music scene. It was given support in Sydney by the Australian Broadcasting Corporation (ABC) rock radio station Double J, which continued when the station moved to the FM band in 1980 and became Triple J.

By 1979, the Brucelanders had secured a recording contract with the Australian branch of Mercury Records and changed its name to the Reels, with the line-up of Abrahams, Bliss, Hooper, Mason and Newham. It released its debut single, "Love Will Find a Way" in October, which entered the top 40 of the Australian Kent Music Report Singles Chart. The group's self-titled debut album was produced by Mark Opitz (the Angels, Cold Chisel) and appeared in November, as did a second single, "Prefab Heart". The group's distinctive image meant it gained increasing attention with music videos featured on the influential national ABC TV pop show Countdown.

In 1979, the band welcomed a 6th member, Karen Ansel. Ansel studied electronic music and sound synthesis with German-born, Australian composer Felix Werder in Melbourne. She was one few female musicians in the febrile art-punk scene in Melbourne in The Romantics. Ansel’s tenure significantly shaped the band’s sound, and Reels rehearsal sessions reflected innovations in electronics which were the inception of ‘Quasimodo’s Dream’, their groundbreaking second album. To signal the new direction, an EP of cover versions, ‘Five Great Gift Ideas’ was released including the original single, ‘After The News’. Their version of the Jim Reeves classic ‘According to My Heart’ reached a wide audience in Australia. In 2001 ’Quasimodo’s Dream’ was placed at 10 for the Top 30 Australian songs of all time, voted on by industry experts. Ansel was also an accomplished visual artist and worked with Mason to conceptualise themes for the tours, music videos, and artwork for posters and records in addition to stage costuming.

This new line-up released a third single, "After the News". It marked a transition in the Reels' music – the group minimised guitars instead utilising synthesisers as its main instruments. The Reels were one of the first groups to use headsets instead of traditional microphones.

During late July, the group undertook the innovative Reels By Rail Tour, using rail transport to destinations in the eastern states. At the end of the year, returning to its covers band origins, The Reels released a five-track Christmas EP, Five Great Gift Ideas from The Reels, produced by Bruce Brown and Russell Dunlop, which included Jim Reeves' "According to My Heart" and Freda Payne's "Band of Gold". "According to My Heart" was accompanied by a folksy music video filmed at a farm in New Zealand. The EP included one original, "The Bombs Dropped on Xmas", co-written by band members Mason, Newham and Ansel with Pamela Shalvey.

=== 1981: Quasimodo's Dream ===
In May 1981, The Reels released the single "Shout and Deliver" as a precursor to the album considered by many to be its best work, Quasimodo's Dream. Here The Reels displayed an impressive maturity in song writing, backed with strong performances, inventive arrangements and top-class production. It peaked at No. 27 in June. The album's title track was released as a single but, although widely considered to be one of the best Australian singles of that period, it failed to chart. The band undertook the Kitchen Man Tour, which saw the stage dressed as a fully equipped Australian kitchen.

The Reels' lack of top 10 mainstream commercial success was at odds with their strong live following, but it was due in part to the restrictive programming on commercial radio at that time, which gave little exposure to local "new wave" acts. The group's deteriorating relationship with Mercury was also a factor, as evidenced by the album's track listing: it included the earlier hit "According to My Heart", but a disclaimer printed on the sleeve noted that it had been included at the insistence of the record company (i.e. against the band's wishes).

Internal tensions were also a factor in the group's career vicissitudes. Bliss left just after the recording of the album, to be replaced by Stefan Fidock (who had played with Ansel in the Romantics). The new five-piece lineup promoted the album with the Kitchen Man Tour, after which Ansel, Newham then Abrahams left the band. Now reduced to a trio (Mason, Hooper and Fidock) The Reels continued performing by augmenting their live sound with taped backing tracks, and used the new Fairlight synthesiser for studio recordings.

=== 1982–1985: Beautiful ===
In late 1982, having signed a new contract with the RCA Records label, The Reels recorded the Beautiful album, mainly covering middle of the road classics with a synthesiser feel. The Reels persuaded RCA to allow a Beautiful "Limited Collectors Edition" to be released by K-tel, known for its licensed pop hit compilations and budget 'golden oldies'. At the time K-tel advertised extensively on Australian TV and was widely regarded as the antithesis of credible music. To emphasise the point, Beautiful was released with "bad taste" artwork that matched the K-tel aesthetic. Although the tracks on Beautiful walked a fine line between sincere tribute and gentle parody, it proved to be the biggest success of The Reels' career, selling in excess of 40,000 copies and reaching No. 32 on the album chart, as well as being certified gold. A single taken from it, a cover of the Burt Bacharach-Hal David song "This Guy's in Love With You" gave the Reels their biggest hit in Australia, peaking at number 7 around November 1982. The album was later re-released through RCA.

In 1983, the band released a five-track EP of original songs, Pitt Street Farmers (the title is an old Sydney satirical expression referring to wealthy owners of rural land who never leave the city). This was followed by a new version of "Quasimodo's Dream" in December 1983, which once again failed to chart. At this point Mason was forced to give up performing after contracting hepatitis, which effectively ended the group. Hooper joined the Church as keyboard player, and later joined the Mullanes, the original incarnation of Crowded House, and Fidock returned to Melbourne, joining the Sacred Cowboys.

By late 1985, Mason had recovered and the Reels was revived (with the line-up of Mason, Hooper, Bliss and Newham) and completed its commitments to RCA with a single, a cover version of Etta James's "It Must Be Love".

=== 1986–1988: Later years ===
The band then signed with Regular Records and released a radically slowed-down, synthesiser-driven version of Creedence Clearwater Revival's "Bad Moon Rising". It proved to be another hit, reaching No. 11 (October 1986); the arrangement featuring prominent use of the Vocoder voice synthesiser, which the band also used extensively on stage to augment Mason's vocals. However, at the end of 1986, Bliss left the band again; he was replaced with programmed drums.

In January 1987, the group issued a cover of the Edison Lighthouse hit "Love Grows (Where My Rosemary Goes)". During that year, they embarked on the popular "Reels By Request" tour, where the audience was allowed to call out for the songs they wanted to hear, chosen from long printed lists. This was followed by an 'all Australian songs' version of the same concept, which led to The Reels' next studio album, Neighbors - the name of which excluded the 'u' which would normally be contained in the Australian English spelling. This LP contained their idiosyncratic versions of thirteen Australian rock classics, including the singles "Are You Old Enough" (originally a hit for Dragon, notwithstanding Dragon was a New Zealand band) and "Forever Now" (by Cold Chisel). Steve Prestwich, who wrote "Forever Now", played on the Reels' version. The album also featured a new version of the Reels' own song "Shout and Deliver".

=== 1989–1992: Breakup ===
In 1989, Mason appeared in the acclaimed Australian feature film Ghosts... of the Civil Dead, in which he co-starred with Nick Cave. In September 1991, The Reels issued its first original single in five years, "I Don't Love You Anymore", followed by what proved to be their last single, a remix by Filthy Lucre of their 1986 single "Bad Moon Rising". The group officially disbanded to coincide with the release of the compilation CD Requiem.

=== 2007–present: Comeback ===
In May 2007, Dave Mason released his first solo album, Reelsville, an acoustic re-recording of Reels hits. In August 2007, Reel to Reel was also released, a compilation of the Reels classic tracks with new liner notes as written by Mason.

In May 2008, Dave Mason, John Bliss and Colin Newham reunited and played shows.

At a subsequent show (the Gaelic Club, Surry Hills; 27 September 2008), Mason announced that Newham was retiring from the band. Original bassist Abrahams then rejoined the band, after 23 years. Despite this, the 'original' Reels have not reunited as a six-piece group.

== After the Reels ==
Hooper was also a member of the Church, the Mullanes (the original incarnation of Crowded House), and also recorded with Rockmelons and Ross Wilson.

Karen Ansel released a solo single, "No Commotion", and retired from the music business to become a noted film and TV computer graphics specialist in the US.

Paul Abrahams also played bass in a band with Newham called Company of Strangers and was also a member of Peter Blakeley's band, The Resurrection. In addition, he played bass for Wendy Matthews, plus drums for Ya Ya Choral, Rat Tat Tat (Peter Blakeley and Jeff Stapleton) and The Bonerattlers who were regular buskers at Paddington Markets.

Fidock joined the Sacred Cowboys in 1987. Around 2008, he established his company Fidock Drums, creating handcrafted snares and drumkits. He died from cancer in April 2020.

John Bliss co-authored the book The A to Zen of Lawn Bowls with John Salter in 1997. He and Polly Newham were both briefly members of Ya Ya Choral, recording an EP with the band, What's a Quaver, and playing with them under the Ya Ya Choral name and, briefly, Zeee Toons.

David Mason appeared in the Countdown Spectacular 2 concert series in Australia between late-August and early-September 2007 as a solo performer. He sang only one song, "Quasimodo's Dream".

In 2007, Mason released a new album, Reelsville on Liberation Blue. He performed one gig to launch the album at The Basement in Sydney on 16 May 2007. A further gig was booked for the Factory Enmore Theatre in Sydney on 24 May 2008. This show became a local cause celebre when police with sniffer dogs arrested two 60-year-old punters for smoking illegal drugs.

On 26 March 2011, Mason appeared on episode 114 of RocKwiz on SBS TV. He performed "Quasimodo's Dream" and ended the show in a duet with Sally Seltmann performing the Conway Twitty song "As Soon as I Hang Up the Phone".

Mason, who now has bipolar disorder, continues to play occasionally in three separate shows, an acoustic duo with Brendan Gallagher from Karma County and an electronic (one man show) 'Dark' with visuals by artist Libby Blainey, music by Scott Saunders from Dig; both these shows are mostly interpretations of Reels songs. 2017 saw the formation of the group Sandy Shores with Mason, Gallagher, Blainey together with Lindy Morrison and Amanda Brown from the Go-Betweens playing hits from past bands but mostly new original material.

In 2024 Chapter Music issued a solo EP by Mason, Double X, from a film soundtrack he composed in 1986.

== Members ==
- Dave Mason – production, design, lead vocals (founding member Native Sons)
- Keith Greig – keyboards (founding member Native Sons)
- Tony Martin – bass (founding member Native Sons)
- Colin 'Polly' Newham – keyboards, vocoder, brass, production, songwriter, vocal
- Craig Hooper – guitars, keyboards, sax, production, songwriter, vocals (founding member Native Sons)
- Paul Abrahams – bass, vocal
- John Bliss – drums (founding member Native Sons)
- Karen Ansel – keyboards, design, costumes, vocals
- Stefan Fidock – drums, vocals (deceased 26 April 2020)

Timeline

== Discography ==
=== Studio albums ===
List of albums, with selected details and chart positions
Title	Album details	Peak chart positions
Title	Album details	AUS
The Reels	Released: 1979; Format: LP, cassette; Label: Mercury (6357 926)	81
Quasimodo's Dream	Released: May 1981; Format: LP, cassette; Label: Mercury (6437 139)	27
Beautiful	Released: October 1982; Format: LP, cassette; Label: RCA (VPL1 0413)	32
Neighbors	Released: December 1988; Format: LP, cassette, CD; Label: Festival (L 38910)	92

=== Compilations ===
List of compilations, with selected details and chart positions
Title	Album details	Peak chart positions
Title	Album details	AUS
Unreel	Released: October 1983; Format: LP, cassette; Label: RCA (VPL1-0416)	—
Requiem	Released: December 1992; Format: CD, VHS; Label: Festival (RMD 93370)	131
Reel to Reel: 1978–1992	Released: 2007; Format: CD, DD; Label: Liberation Blue (BLUE153.2)	—

=== EPs ===
List of EPs, with selected details and chart positions
Title	EP details	Peak chart positions
Title	EP details	AUS
Five Great Gift Ideas from The Reels	Released: November 1980; Format: LP, cassette; Label: Mercury (6235 014)	12
Pitt Street Farmers	Released: September 1983; Format: LP, cassette; Label: RCA Australia (SP 246)	—
The Reels 1979 EP	Released: 2019; Format: Download; Label: Bloodlines (BLOODLP48)	—
6 Great Gift Ideas	Released: 2019; Format: Download; Label: Bloodlines (BLOODLP60)	—

=== Singles ===
List of singles, with selected chart positions
Year	Title	Peak chart positions	Album
Year	Title	AUS	Album
1979	"Love Will Find a Way" / "Spot the Ridge"	39	The Reels
1980	"Prefab Heart" / "Misused Abused"	52	The Reels
1980	"After the News" / "Media Themes"	65	Quasimodo's Dream
1980	"According to My Heart" / "Love Will Find a Way"	— (Note: "According to My Heart" sales counted towards the sale of the EP 5 Great Ideas)	Quasimodo's Dream
1981	"Shout and Deliver" / "Depression"	43	Quasimodo's Dream
1981	"Quasimodo's Dream" / "(Love Is) Here Today"	—	Quasimodo's Dream
1981	"No.3" / "1, 2, 3" / "Haunted"	93	Non-album single
1982	"This Guy's in Love with You" / "Cry"	7	Beautiful
1983	"(Last Night) I Didn't Get to Sleep at All" / "Science Is Golden"	—	Beautiful
1983	"Happiness" / "Comedy"	—	Pitt Street Farmers
1985	"It Must Be Love" / "My Family"	—	Non-album singles
1986	"Bad Moon Rising" / "World's End"	11	Non-album singles
1987	"Love Grows (Where My Rosemary Goes)" / "Media Themes II"	70	Non-album singles
1988	"Forever Now"	135	Neighbors
1989	"Are You Old Enough?" / "What's My Scene?"	—	Neighbors
1991	"I Don't Love You Anymore"	125	Requiem
1992	"Bad Moon Rising"	125	Requiem

== Awards and nominations ==
=== Countdown Music Awards ===
Countdown was an Australian pop music TV series on national broadcaster ABC-TV from 1974–1987, it presented music awards from 1979–1987, initially in conjunction with magazine TV Week. The TV Week / Countdown Awards were a combination of popular-voted and peer-voted awards.

Year	Nominee / work	Award	Result
1982	"This Guy's in Love with You"	Best Australian Single	Nominated

== Legacy ==
The song "Quasimodo's Dream" is regarded as an Australian rock classic and has been covered by Kate Ceberano, Rob Snarski, Mick Harvey and Jimmy Little. In 2001, it was voted one of the top 10 Australian songs of all time by APRA.
