= When You Come =

Single by Crowded House

from the album Temple of Low Men
- Released: August 1988
- Recorded: 1987
- Genre: Rock
- Length: 4:45
- Label: Capitol
- Songwriter(s): Neil Finn
- Producer(s): Mitchell Froom

Crowded House singles chronology
"Better Be Home Soon" (1988)	"When You Come" (1988)	"Into Temptation" (1988)

"When You Come" is a song by rock group Crowded House and was released in August 1988 on Capitol Records as the second Australian single from their second album Temple of Low Men. The song peaked at #27 on the ARIA Singles Chart. Both B sides, "Something So Strong" (July 1987) and "Better Be Home Soon" (July 1988) were previously released as singles. All songs were written by band leader Neil Finn except "Something So Strong" by Finn and record producer, Mitchell Froom. In UK and European markets, "Sister Madly" was released as the second single from Temple of Low Men, also in August.

"When You Come" appears on Crowded House's greatest hits album Recurring Dream (June 1996) and was also performed at the group's farewell concert, released as Farewell to the World (November 1996).

== Background ==
Temple of Low Men is Crowded House's second studio album, it was produced by Mitchell Froom and was released in July 1988 on Capitol Records. The album's lead single, "Better Be Home Soon", hinted at a much darker tone than the debut album, Crowded House from 1986. Although it was critically acclaimed, Temple of Low Men did not sell as well in the United States, it did better in Australia and New Zealand. "When You Come", the second Australian single, peaked at #27 on the ARIA Singles Chart.

"When You Come" was recorded by Tchad Blake and mixed by Bob Clearmountain. A live version was recorded at The Roxy, Los Angeles, US on 26 February 1987 and was issued as a three-track CD-EP in September 1993. Another live version was recorded at The Town & Country Club, London, England, on 9 November 1991 and was issued in UK as a four-track CD-EP in February 1992 and on an Australian five-track CD-EP in October 1993.

== Track listings ==
All songs are written by Neil Finn, except "Something So Strong" by Finn and Mitchell Froom.

=== 7" vinyl ===
1. "When You Come" – 4:45
2. "Better Be Home Soon" – 3:07

=== CD single & cassette ===
1. "When You Come" – 4:45
2. "Better Be Home Soon" – 3:07
3. "Something So Strong" – 2:51

== Personnel ==
=== Crowded House ===
- Neil Finn – lead vocals, guitar
- Nick Seymour – bass guitar, backing vocals
- Paul Hester – drums, backing vocals

=== Additional musicians ===
- Tim Finn - backing vocals
- Alex Acuña – percussion
- Heart Attack – horns
- Mitchell Froom – keyboards

=== Production ===
- Mitchell Froom – producer
- Tchad Blake – engineer
- Bob Clearmountain – mixer
