= Karen Ansel =

American visual effects specialist

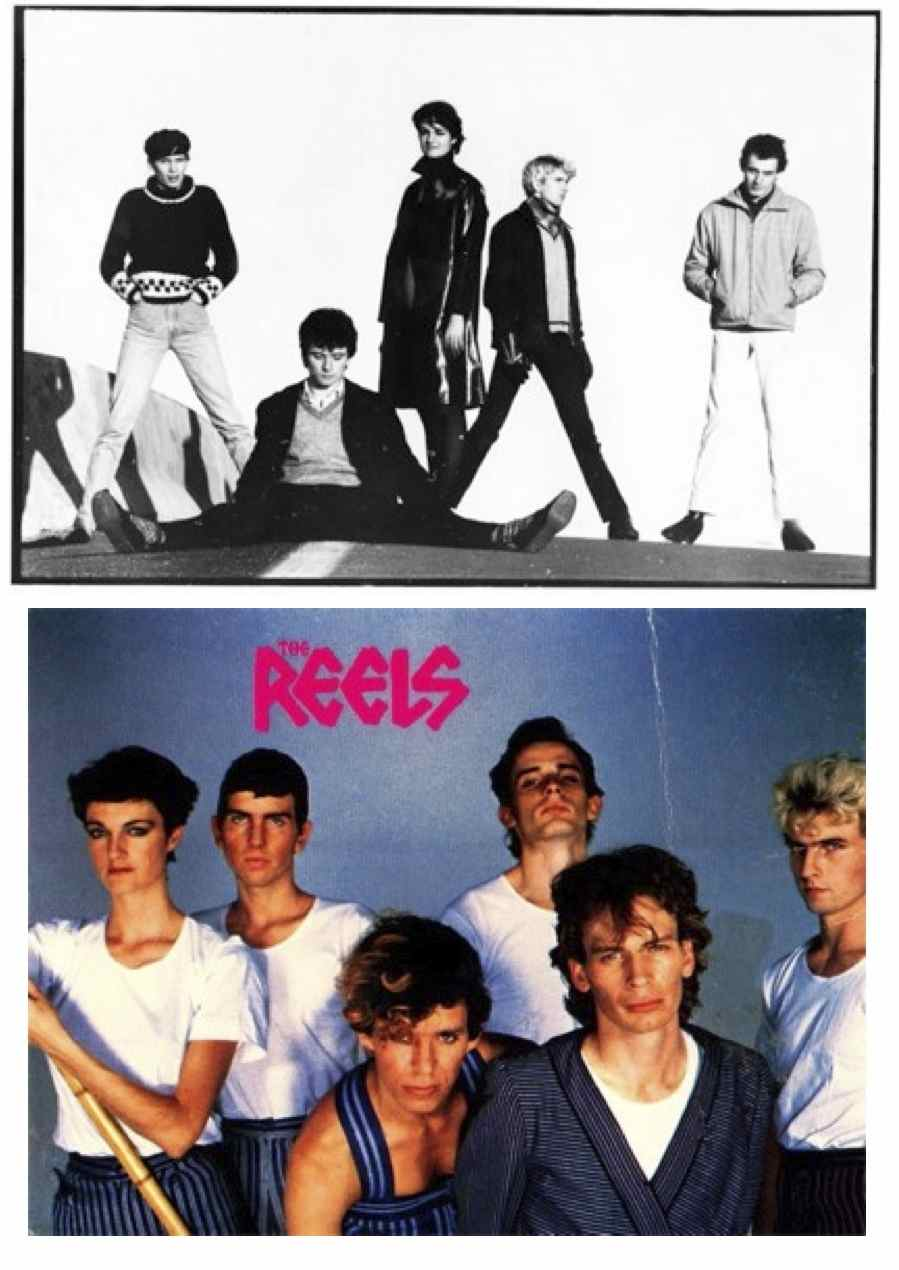
- Karen Ansel in The Reels

Background information
- Born: Australia
- Genres: Rock, new wave
- Occupations: Musician, keyboardist, singer, graphic artist
- Years active: 1980–present

Karen Ansel is a visual effects specialist in the United States.

Previously an Australian musician, she was an influential member of the Australian band The Reels. In 2001, the title track "Quasimodo's Dream" from their album Quasimodo's Dream was voted one of the Top 10 Australian Songs of all time by APRA.

Ansel worked in visual effects at Industrial Light & Magic in the United States. She supervised the Academy Award-winning effects in Vincent Ward’s film What Dreams May Come, as well as Nutty Professor II: The Klumps, Flubber, and artist Matthew Barney's Cremaster Cycle. Her film credits range from The Mask (1993) to Angels & Demons (2009), in addition to other major Hollywood film titles.

In 2010, Ansel became a member of the Academy of Motion Picture Arts and Sciences (Visual Effects Branch).

Other film credits include still photography for Mystify: Michael Hutchence, directed by Richard Lowenstein (2019).

== Early career ==
In 1984 Ansel attended Middlesex Polytechnic with Dr. John Vince, studying Fortran and his custom PICASO graphics software.

In 1986 she started working in Australia in 3D with Gary Tregaskis on his in-house 3D software, which transitioned into his world release of Flame. She continued working through various Australian production companies, gaining experience on Alias/Wavefront, SoftImage, Prisms (Houdini) and code-based compositing. Her early broadcast CG work includes 3D animations and design for national TV sports and station IDs, Barcelona Olympics and various music videos.

She worked on 'lightpen' animations for Pete Townshend's film White City and Face the Face, directed by Richard Lowenstein.

Her VFX supervision for Max Q, "MondayNightBySatellite", in 1989, involved early renderings of the Mandelbrot set.

== VFX for film ==
Ansel attended Siggraph conferences since 1989, and in 1991 began work with digital visual effects for film in the US at VIFX, using particle software (Prisms/Houdini). In 1993 she joined Industrial Light & Magic for The Mask (most recognizably the ‘wolf’ sequence as technical director) and other projects including the initial scene reconstruction for digital of Star Wars: A New Hope, a ‘proof of concept’ sequence with a small team which included Joe Letteri and Steve Williams, utilizing in-house software developed for the sequence.

She went to Weta Digital for The Frighteners in New Zealand, one of the earliest incarnations of the company. Returning to the US, she formed an independent 3D production company in Los Angeles, whose contract work included Flubber, Nutty Professor II, and artist Matthew Barney's Cremaster cycle. As CG supervisor on What Dreams May Come, she supervised the ‘painted world’ sequence. The film won the 1999 Academy Award for Visual Effects, and the ‘painted world’ optical flow-based image manipulation, developed on the film, won the Academy Technical Achievement award in 2007.

Continuing to maintain hands-on skills in developing technologies in large and small visual effects production companies in the US, Canada, New Zealand and Australia afforded Ansel a broad perspective on various approach in the industry of technological developments. In 2004 she travelled to Beijing as VFX consultant for Tsui Hark's Seven Swords. As digital artist she created the 10K rendering for The Hulk poster and worked on productions including Men in Black II, Pirates of the Caribbean: At Worlds End, The Hobbit: 'An Unexpected Journey, The Desolation of Smaug and Tintin.

As CG supervisor on Angels & Demons she developed the pipeline, look and technical approach for rendering complex architecture.

She has presented at conferences including Ausgraph, Siggraph and the Latin American Film Festival.

Ansel is a member of the Academy of Motion Picture Arts and Sciences (Visual Effects Branch).

== Music ==
Ansel studied electronic music and sound synthesis with German-born, Australian composer Felix Werder in Melbourne. She was one few female musicians in the febrile art-punk scene in Melbourne (from which Nick Cave emerged). Her band 'The Romantics' were influenced by punk, disco and Beefheart. “I had a Korg MS-20, a Roland SH-2000 feeding though an MXR digital delay and a Lesley speaker.” she says. “We were motivated. (in 1977) There were still no other women playing those gigs yet the door was open with three chords and an attitude.” The band also featured Nick Seymour (bass), later of 'Crowded House'. 'The Romantics' played support for 'The Reels' and her approach to sound was noted by Mason and Hooper, alert for a change in direction for their band.

The Reels:

In 1979, the band welcomed her as a 6th member. Mason in particular had railed against the machismo in the Australian music industry. Ansel’s tenure significantly shaped the band’s sound, and Reels rehearsal sessions reflected innovations in electronics which were the inception of ‘Quasimodo’s Dream’, their groundbreaking second album. To signal the new direction, an EP of cover versions, ‘Five Great Gift Ideas’ was released including the original single, ‘After The News’. Their version of the Jim Reeves classic ‘According to My Heart’ reached a wide audience in Australia. In 2001 ’Quasimodo’s Dream’ was placed at 10 for the Top 30 Australian songs of all time, voted on by industry experts. Ansel was also an accomplished visual artist and worked with Mason to conceptualise themes for the tours, music videos, and artwork for posters and records in addition to stage costuming. The band toured with headset mics and small Bose speakers and electronic keyboards on the same circuits as the OzRock bands (Midnight Oil, INXS, Cold Chisel etc. Ansel and Mason sang backing vocals on INXS track ‘Stay Young’). They planned their third album on K-Tel, ‘Beautiful’. The gruelling Australian tour circuit took its toll In 1982 two original members of The Reels left. Ansel bought in Stephan Fidock (drummer) with whom she had played in The Romantics. Ansel too then decided leave. In 1983 she wrote and recorded a solo single ‘No Commotion’. In 1984 she fully left the music industry for London to pursue the emergent technology of 3D computer animation.

Ansel went on to become a world-renowned 3D computer visual effects specialist. In 2010 she was invited to become a member of the Visual Effects branch of AMPAS (The Oscars).

== Solo discography ==
- 1983: "No Commotion" b/w "Casa", (produced by Neil Finn)
