= World Where You Live =

Single by Crowded House

from the album Crowded House
- Released: July 1986
- Genre: Rock
- Length: 3:05
- Label: Capitol
- Songwriter(s): Neil Finn
- Producer(s): Mitchell Froom

Crowded House singles chronology
"Mean to Me" (1986)	"World Where You Live" (1986)	"Now We're Getting Somewhere" (1986)

"World Where You Live" is a song by Australian-New Zealand rock band Crowded House. It was the second single from the group's debut album Crowded House. Though it was the second single, "World Where You Live" was the first internationally released single, as the first single "Mean to Me" was only released in Australia. It was released a month after the album Crowded House was released.

The song later appeared on Crowded House's greatest hits compilation Recurring Dream and was performed at the group's farewell concert Farewell to the World.

== Music video ==
The music video for the song shows Neil Finn holding a flying dollhouse in his hands, and then letting it go as he sings the lyrics while an oversized dollhouse comes into view. The rest of the band comes into the house, and then the whole band starts performing in a room inside the house. One scene shows Neil turning a page in a book containing maps of his home country, New Zealand, while experimenting with more dollhouses. Another scene shows the band coming out of the house while a party is going on, and the last scene shows the empty room in the house, indicating the band has left, except that a chandelier is dangling back and forth and Paul Hester's drums are still left in the room before the video fades to black.

== Track listings ==
All songs by Neil Finn except "Something So Strong" by Finn and Mitchell Froom and "That's What I Call Love" by Paul Hester and Finn. Tracks on vinyl singles are all from the album "Crowded House" album, except the extended version of "World Where You Live." On all formats "That's What I Call Love" is 4:22, but the actual tracks are 3:39.

=== Australian 7" vinyl ===
Catalogue no: Capitol / CP 1769.

1. "World Where You Live" - 3:07
2. "Hole In The River" - 4:02

=== UK 7" vinyl ===
Catalogue no: Capitol / CL 416.

1. "World Where You Live" - 3:07
2. "That's What I Call Love" - 3:39

=== UK 12" vinyl ===
Catalogue no: Capitol / 12 CL 416.

1. "World Where You Live" (extended version) - 4:36
2. "Can't Carry On" - 3:57
3. "That's What I Call Love" - 3:39

=== UK CD single ===
Catalogue no: Capitol / CDCL 416. Also available on MC (Capitol/ TC CL 416).

1. "World Where You Live" (extended version) - 4:36
2. "Something So Strong" - 2:51
3. "Don't Dream It's Over" - 4:03
4. "That's What I Call Love" - 3:39

=== US 12" vinyl ===
Catalogue no: Capitol / SPRO-9693/9694. Promotional release.

1. "World Where You Live" - 3:07
2. "Mean to Me" - 3:15
3. "Something So Strong" - 2:51

=== US Promotional CD single ===
Catalogue no: Capitol / DPRO 79070. US Promotional CD single. Track 2 recorded at Wolfgang's, San Francisco, CA, 9 April 1987. Track 3 recorded at The Trocadero, Philadelphia, PA, 24 March 1987. Track 4 recorded at The Roxy, Los Angeles, CA, 26 February 1987. The "single version" of "World Where You Live" is similar to the album version at 3:07. "World Where You Live" (live) is unique to this release, where both "Something So Strong" and "Don't Dream It's Over" will see official releases on singles to come. On a general note; there are several mix-ups of dates claiming "Don't Dream It's Over" to be from 24/3/1987 and "Something So Strong" to be from 26/2/1987. All "versions" in the 5:55 range of "Don't Dream It's Over" are from 26/2/1987 and "Something So Strong" from 24/3/1987.

1. "World Where You Live" (single version) - 3:05
2. "World Where You Live" (live) - 5:08
3. "Something So Strong" (live) - 4:02
4. "Don't Dream It's Over" (live) - 5:53

== Charts ==
Chart (1986/87)	Peak position
Australian (Kent Music Report)	43
Netherlands (Dutch Top 40 Tipparade)	14
US Billboard Hot 100	65

== Certifications ==
Certifications for "World Where You Live"
Region	Certification	Certified units/sales
Australia (ARIA)	Gold	35,000^{‡}
^{‡} Sales+streaming figures based on certification alone.

== Release history ==
Region	Date
United Kingdom	July 1986
Australia	2 March 1987
