= Paul Abrahams (musician) =

Australian musician (born 1958)

- Born: 21 October 1958 (age 67); Sydney, New South Wales, Australia
- Genre: Rock
- Occupation: Musician
- Instrument: Electric bass guitar
- Formerly of: The Reels

Paul Abrahams (born 21 October 1958) is an Australian musician and bass player for the Reels

== Biography ==
Abrahams joined the Reels in 1978 and recorded 2 albums and 1 EP between 1979 and 1981. The basses used on those recordings was a 1962 Fender VI and 1968 Fender Precision fretless, he currently plays a 4-string Tony Franklin Signature Fender Precision Bass.

The Reels album Quasimodo's Dream and single of the same name was voted in 2001 by APRA in the Top Ten Most Influential Australian songs of the past 75 years.

During the 1978–1981 period he worked as a session musician for MOJO Jimmy Sloggett with musician Tommy Emmanuel

1980–1981 – Art and music experiments with Brett Cabot Artist.

1984–1988 – Recording and writing at Kings Lane Studios with Chris Betro engineer.

1984 played Drums for a trio called 'Rat Tat Tat' with Peter Blakeley Vocals, Geoff Stapleton on Bass from The Aliens (Australian band) and GANGgajang.

During the Kings Lane Studio years, Paul Abrahams and Chris Bettro recorded an EP. Out of the many co writing ventures, one song, 'As we Speak' a co write with Robbie James of GANGgajang was recorded by Wendy Matthews on her first album Emigre.

1986–1988 Played bass for Peter Blakeley in 'The Resurrection' with backing singer Wendy Matthews Mark Punch Guitar, Hughie Benjamin Drums, and Peter Kekel Keyboards / Geoff Stapleton Keyboards.

In 1991 played bass for Wendy Matthews during her support tour with The Neville Brothers. In 1991 played bass for James Blundell, Mick King (guitarist), Lee Kernaghan (keyboards).

From 1991 to 2000 he spent some years away from the music industry and in 2002 made his way back into music via the Logic Pro now Logic Studio software, experimenting with loops and atmospheric sounds and website building using the SBI platform developed by Ken Evoy.

2003–2005 Taught Bass, Guitar and Drums. Remixed prerecorded CD's for Wakakirri performers, Glenhaven Public School Divisional, State and Australian Winners 2002–2004.

Rejoined The Reels in 2008 who were invited by Sydney Festival in 2010 to perform as part of circa 1979.

2014–Present Currently working as a cinematographer and bassist for The Willing Ponies.
