= Chocolate Cake (song) =

1991 single by Crowded House

Single by Crowded House

from the album Woodface
- B-side: "As Sure as I Am", "Anyone Can Tell"
- Released: 27 May 1991
- Length: 4:02
- Label: Capitol
- Songwriters: Neil Finn, Tim Finn
- Producers: Mitchell Froom, Neil Finn

Crowded House singles chronology
"I Feel Possessed" (1989)	"Chocolate Cake" (1991)	"Fall at Your Feet" (1991)

"Chocolate Cake" is a song by rock music group Crowded House from their third studio album, Woodface (1991). Released as a single in May 1991, the song reached number seven in New Zealand, number nine in Canada, and number two on the US Billboard Modern Rock Tracks chart. The John Hillcoat-directed music video won the ARIA Award for Best Video at the ARIA Music Awards of 1992.

== History and description ==
The song was not originally intended as the lead single, as it was more intended for "It's Only Natural" to be the lead track. However, despite this, "Chocolate Cake" was released as the album's lead single. Despite performing marginally better than the singles from Temple of Low Men in the United States, the song was thought to offend due to its lyrics and the song gained only moderate performance in the US, as it referred to Americans having an "excess of fat on your American bones". The song reached number two on the US Billboard Modern Rock Tracks chart while also peaking at number 20 on the Australian ARIA Singles Chart and number 69 on the UK Singles Chart.

The B-sides featured are "As Sure as I Am", a song from Woodface, and "Anyone Can Tell", which was intended for release on the album however was not released due to the amalgamation of the Woodface project with the Finn Brothers project. The song later appeared on the rarities collection Afterglow and was released as its lead promotional single.

== Personnel ==
Crowded House

- Neil Finn – lead vocals, lead and rhythm guitar, keyboards
- Tim Finn – backing vocals
- Nick Seymour – bass guitar, backing vocals
- Paul Hester – drums, backing vocals

Additional musicians

- Mitchell Froom – keyboards
- Mark Hart – keyboards
- Alex Acuña – percussion
- Geoffrey Hales – percussion
- Chris Wilson – harmonica
- Jack Mack – brass

== Tracks ==
- "Chocolate Cake": written by Neil Finn and Tim Finn
- "As Sure as I Am", "Anyone Can Tell": written by Neil Finn
- Both "Chocolate Cake" and "As Sure as I Am" are from the album "Woodface". "Anyone Can Tell" is an outtake from the "Woodface" sessions, later to be released on the album "Afterglow"

Single release

- Released in UK as CD single and 7-inch vinyl and in US as cassette
1. "Chocolate Cake" – 4:02
2. "As Sure as I Am" – 2:53

EP release

- Released in UK as CD single and 12-inch vinyl and in US and Japan as CD
1. "Chocolate Cake" – 4:02
2. "As Sure as I Am" – 2:53
3. "Anyone Can Tell" – 3:37

== Charts ==
=== Weekly charts ===
Chart (1991)	Peak position
Australia (ARIA)	20
Belgium (Ultratop 50 Flanders)	34
Canada Top Singles (RPM)	9
Netherlands (Dutch Top 40)	24
Netherlands (Single Top 100)	27
New Zealand (Recorded Music NZ)	7
UK Singles (Official Charts)	69
US Modern Rock Tracks (Billboard)	2

=== Year-end charts ===
Chart (1991)	Position
Canada Top Singles (RPM)	65
US Modern Rock Tracks (Billboard)	23

== Release history ==
Region	Date	Format(s)	Label(s)	Ref.
Australia	27 May 1991	7-inch vinyl; cassette	Capitol	
Australia	3 June 1991	CD	Capitol	
United Kingdom	10 June 1991	7-inch vinyl; 12-inch vinyl; CD; cassette	Capitol	
Japan	28 June 1991	Mini-CD	Capitol	
Australia	15 July 1991	12-inch vinyl	Capitol	
