= Into Temptation (song) =

1988 single by Crowded House

Single by Crowded House

from the album Temple of Low Men
- Released: December 1988
- Length: 4:32
- Label: Capitol
- Songwriter(s): Neil Finn
- Producer(s): Mitchell Froom

Crowded House singles chronology
"When You Come" (1988)	"Into Temptation" (1988)	"Sister Madly" (1988)

"Into Temptation" is a song by Australasian rock group Crowded House. It was the third single from the group's second album, Temple of Low Men (1988). The single peaked at number 59 on the Australian ARIA Singles Chart in January 1989 and reached the top 20 in the Netherlands.

"Into Temptation" appears on Crowded House's greatest hits album Recurring Dream. The song was also performed by Renée Geyer for the Finn brothers female tribute album She Will Have Her Way in 2005.

== Reception ==
Junkee said, "If you ever needed an example of how convincing Neil Finn’s songwriting is, consider this: Sharon Finn thought Neil was cheating on her because of this song. Add in the undercurrent of Hester’s unmistakable jazz-brush finesse and a synth-string orchestral sweep, and you’re left with one of the band’s most emotive, understated moments."

Nexus noted the, "sparse verse instrumentation, vocals front and centre, followed by a lush chorus with a melody that draws you in, its simplicity is a masterstroke and its effectiveness is measurable.

== Track listings ==
All songs were written by Neil Finn except "This Is Massive", written by Paul Hester.

Australian 7-inch, 12-inch, and CD single

1. "Into Temptation" – 4:32
2. "Mansion in the Slums" (live)
3. "This Is Massive" (live)

US 7-inch and cassette single

1. "Into Temptation" – 4:32
2. "Better Be Home Soon" – 3:07

European 12-inch single

1. "Into Temptation" – 4:32
2. "Now We're Getting Somewhere" (live)
3. "Mansion in the Slums" (live)

== Charts ==
Chart (1989)	Peak position
Australia (ARIA)	59
Belgium (Ultratop 50 Flanders)	28
Netherlands (Dutch Top 40)	12
Netherlands (Single Top 100)	20
New Zealand (Recorded Music NZ)	38
