= Mean to Me (Crowded House song) =

Single by Crowded House

from the album Crowded House
- B-side: "Hole in the River"
- Released: June 1986
- Genre: Pop rock
- Length: 3:17
- Label: Capitol
- Songwriter: Neil Finn
- Producer: Mitchell Froom

Crowded House singles chronology
"Mean to Me" (1986)	"World Where You Live" (1986)

"Mean to Me" is the debut single by Australian-New Zealand rock band Crowded House. It was originally released in June 1986 as a 7" vinyl, and was the lead single from the group's self-titled debut album, Crowded House. It peaked at No. 26 in Australia.

At the 1986 Countdown Australian Music Awards, the song was nominated for Best Debut Single. It mentions passing the town of Te Awamutu. The music video presents a longer intro showing the band enjoying themselves, and then playing the song in a warehouse. Repeatedly throughout the video, the band members continuously mouth "I love you" shown by the words in the video saying, "I LOVE YOU."

"Mean to Me" was (and indeed still is) often performed as the opening song for Crowded House's concerts, and it was most notably the first song performed at their Farewell to the World concert in 1996 (promoted at the time as their final show, but since succeeded by multiple tours). It later appeared on the group's greatest hits compilation Recurring Dream.

== Composition ==
The lyrics largely concern an American Split Enz fan who had written to Neil Finn's parents, hoping to meet him. Finn said, "The verse was written on a tour of New Zealand I did with Dave Dobbyn under the absolutely shocking moniker of the Party Boys. I met her and had 10 minutes with her. Then I came back later and she was dancing with Gary McCormick, so I wrote those lines in which I did intimate they'd got it on. She bailed me up in LA about three years later and was most upset. She swears she didn't. I felt chastened by that."

== Reception ==
Junkee said, "The hangover of Split Enz is still present, most notably in the song’s wigged-out keyboard detour. What "Mean to Me" accomplishes outside of that, is establishing key touchstones of what will go on to be inextricable parts of the Crowded House sound. Both Finn’s strident pop sensibilities and his unique lyrical sense of place."

== Track listing ==
Track 1 by Neil Finn. Track 2 by Finn and Eddie Rayner. Both tracks from the Crowded House album.

1. "Mean to Me" - 3:17
2. "Hole in the River" - 4:02

== Charts ==
Chart (1986)	Peak position
Australian (Kent Music Report)	26

== Certifications ==
Certifications for "Mean to Me"
Region	Certification	Certified units/sales
Australia (ARIA)	Platinum	70,000^{‡}
^{‡} Sales+streaming figures based on certification alone.
