= Temple of Low Men =

Studio album by Crowded House
- Released: 5 July 1988
- Recorded: 1987−1988
- Studios: Platinum Studio (Melbourne); Sunset Sound (Los Angeles)
- Genres: Pop rock; alternative rock; jangle pop
- Length: 38:04
- Label: Capitol
- Producer: Mitchell Froom

Crowded House chronology
Crowded House (1986)	Temple of Low Men (1988)	Woodface (1991)

Singles from Temple of Low Men
- 1. "Better Be Home Soon" Released: 12 June 1988; 2. "When You Come" Released: August 1988; 3. "Into Temptation" Released: December 1988; 4. "Sister Madly" Released: 1989; 5. "I Feel Possessed" Released: 29 January 1990

Temple of Low Men is the second studio album by New Zealand-Australian rock band Crowded House, released by Capitol Records on 5 July 1988. The three band members, Neil Finn, Nick Seymour and Paul Hester, recorded the album in Melbourne and Los Angeles with Mitchell Froom as producer. Finn had written all ten tracks during the two years since their self-titled debut. Temple of Low Men peaked at number one in Australia, number two in New Zealand, number ten in Canada and number 40 on the US Billboard 200.

At the ARIA Music Awards of 1989 the group won four categories: Album of the Year and Best Group for Temple of Low Men; Best Cover Art for Seymour's work; and Song of the Year for "Better Be Home Soon".

== Background ==
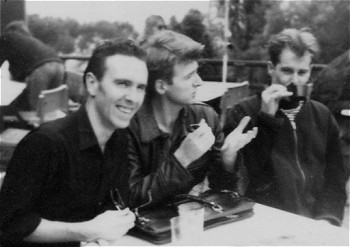
The band at the Montreux Pop Festival, May 1988. L to R: Nick Seymour, Neil Finn, Paul Hester. Two months later they released their second album, Temple of Low Men.

Crowded House and Neil Finn, as their main songwriter, were under pressure to create a second album to match their self-titled debut from June 1986; the band joked that one potential title for the new release was Mediocre Follow-Up. Eventually titled Temple of Low Men, their second album was released in July 1988 with strong promotion by Capitol Records.

Crowded House undertook a short tour of Australia and Canada to promote the album, with Eddie Rayner (former Split Enz bandmate of Hester and Finn) as a touring member on keyboards. Multi-instrumentalist Mark Hart (ex-Supertramp) replaced Rayner in January 1989. After the tour, Finn fired Seymour from the band. Music journalist Ed Nimmervoll claimed that Seymour's temporary departure was because Finn blamed him for causing his writer's block, however Finn cited "artistic differences" as the reason. Seymour said that after a month he contacted Finn and they agreed that he would return to the band.

== Composition and recording ==
Neil Finn wrote all ten tracks for Temple of Low Men during the two years since their first album. It was produced by Mitchell Froom, recorded by Tchad Blake and mixed by Bob Clearmountain. The cover was created by Seymour. The lyric 'Tongue in the Mail' from the track "Love This Life" gave its name to the band's official mailing list. Richard Thompson performed the solo on "Sister Madly".

== Reception ==
Professional ratings
Review scores
Source	Rating
AllMusic	4.5/5 stars
Chicago Sun-Times	3.5/4 stars
Classic Rock	6/10
Los Angeles Times	3.5/4 stars
Mojo	4/5 stars
NME	9/10
Record Mirror	3 1/2/5
Rolling Stone	4/5 stars
Uncut	6/10
The Village Voice	C

AllMusic praised Temple of Low Men, but noted a change of tone from the previous album, saying, "The material on Temple of Low Men demonstrates great leaps in quality over its predecessor, it is a darkly difficult album ... Finn digs into the depths of his emotional psyche with obsessive detail, crafting a set of intense, personal songs ... Through all of this introspective soul-searching, Finn reveals most of all his true mastery of melody. Robert Christgau of The Village Voice panned the album as being buried in sanctimonious self-pity, and commented that "Finn has neglected the only thing he has to offer the world: perky hooks."

In October 2010, Temple of Low Men was listed at number 71 in the book, 100 Best Australian Albums, with the band's next album, Woodface at No. 3.

== Track listing ==
All tracks are written by Neil Finn, unless otherwise noted.

No.	Title	Length
1.	"I Feel Possessed"	3:48
2.	"Kill Eye"	3:14
3.	"Into Temptation"	4:33
4.	"Mansion in the Slums"	3:45
5.	"When You Come"	4:45
6.	"Never Be the Same"	4:28
7.	"Love This Life"	3:36
8.	"Sister Madly"	2:52
9.	"In the Lowlands"	3:56
10.	"Better Be Home Soon"	3:07
Total length:		38:04

2016 reissue adds a 2nd disc: Unreleased and rare material
No.	Title	Writer(s)	Length
1.	"Whispers and Moans (Home Demo)"		2:03
2.	"Never be the Same (Home Demo)"		1:19
3.	"Dream On (Home Demo)"		1:31
4.	"Never Been Born (Rehearsal Excerpt)"		1:01
5.	"Think I'm Gonna Change (Home Demo)"		1:43
6.	"Into Temptation (Home Demo)"		2:17
7.	"Fire Will Keep Me Warm (In the Lowlands Home Demo)"		1:25
8.	"Love This Life (Home Demo)"		2:25
9.	"Sister Madly (Studio Outtake)"		3:30
10.	"Mansion in the Slums (Live)"		4:47
11.	"This is Massive (Live)"	Paul Hester	4:02
12.	"Love This Life (Live)"		3:41
13.	"In the Lowlands (Live)"		6:21
14.	"I Feel Possessed (Live)"		6:11
15.	"Burnt Out Tree (Live)"		1:27
16.	"Mr. Tambourine Man (Live)"	Bob Dylan	2:35
17.	"Eight Miles High (Live)"	Gene Clark, Roger McGuinn, David Crosby	4:50
18.	"So You Want to Be a Rock 'n' Roll Star (Live)"	Chris Hillman, Roger McGuinn	2:49
19.	"When You Come (live)"		7:06
20.	"Sister Madly (Live)"		4:59
21.	"Better Be Home Soon (Live)"		5:11
Total length:			71:13

== Personnel ==
Crowded House

- Neil Finn – lead vocals, guitar
- Nick Seymour – bass, backing vocals
- Paul Hester – drums, backing vocals

Additional musicians

- Tim Finn – backing vocals
- Mitchell Froom – keyboards
- Richard Thompson – guitar solo on "Sister Madly"
- Alex Acuña – percussion
- Heart Attack Horns – horns

Technical personnel

- Mitchell Froom – production
- Tchad Blake – recording
- Bob Clearmountain – mixing
- Bob Ludwig – mastering
- Nick Seymour – art direction, album art
- Tommy Steele – art direction
- Dennis Keeley – photography

== Charts ==
=== Weekly charts ===
Chart (1988–95)	Peak position
Australian Albums (ARIA)	1
Canadian Albums Chart	10
Dutch Albums Chart	20
New Zealand Albums (RMNZ)	2
UK Albums Chart	99
US Billboard 200	40

=== Year-end charts ===
Chart (1988)	Position
Australia (ARIA Charts)	14

== Certifications ==
Region	Certification	Certified units/sales
Australia (ARIA)	3× Platinum	210,000^{^}
Canada (Music Canada)	Platinum	100,000^{^}
New Zealand (RMNZ)	Platinum	15,000^{^}
United Kingdom (BPI)	Silver	60,000^{‡}
^{^} Shipments figures based on certification alone.^{‡} Sales+streaming figures based on certification alone.
