= Craig Hooper =

Australian musician (born 1959)

- Born: Craig Lincoln Hooper; 23 November 1959 (age 66); Dubbo, New South Wales, Australia
- Genres: Indie rock
- Occupation: Musician
- Instruments: Guitar, keyboards
- Years active: 1976–present

Craig Lincoln Hooper (born 23 November 1959) is an Australian musician who was a core member (with Dave Mason) of indie rock band the Reels (1977–1992), and was in bands the Mullanes (the initial incarnation of Crowded House), the Church (appears on their 1984 five-track extended play, Persia) and the Crystal Set.

As a keyboardist or guitarist, he was a session musician for Do-Ré-Mi, Rockmelons and Ross Wilson.

Hooper was also involved in songwriting (co-writing with the Reels members) and record producing (with Mason and Bruce Brown).
