= Better Be Home Soon =

1988 single by Crowded House

Single by Crowded House

from the album Temple of Low Men
- B-side: "Kill Eye"
- Released: 12 June 1988
- Length: 3:07
- Label: Capitol
- Songwriter: Neil Finn
- Producer: Mitchell Froom

Crowded House singles chronology
"Something So Strong" (1987)	"Better Be Home Soon" (1988)	"When You Come" (1988)

"Better Be Home Soon" is a song written by Neil Finn and performed by rock band Crowded House. It appears on their second studio album, Temple of Low Men, which was released in July 1988. The song was issued as a single in June 1988 by Capitol Records, peaking at number two on the Australian and New Zealand charts, number one on Canada's The Record chart, and number 42 on the US Billboard Hot 100.

In 2001, the song was voted by members of Australasian Performing Right Association (APRA) as the 33rd-best New Zealand song of the 20th century. It placed 38 in the Triple J Hottest 100 of Australian Songs in 2025. In 2005, following drummer Paul Hester's death, Finn performed the song solo at the ARIA Awards while a montage of Hester's life was played in the background.

== Music video ==
Nick Seymour attempted to explain the concept of the video in a 1988 issue of Smash Hits. He likened it to the INXS video he worked on for Listen Like Thieves: "only theirs was sort of macho." He called it a fun video with the Dickensian style clothes people were wearing. Seymour says it this way:

"Basically a film clip just makes people see things that the song's not really about. This song is definitely not about being in a theatre stuck out in the desert! It's about being home, how it's better being home.

The reason Seymour played the double bass for the video was because "it just looks better".

== Notable performances ==
"Better Be Home Soon" was performed by Crowded House in their 1996 charity performance Farewell to the World. As a song commonly performed by the band, this was to be expected, however the end of this version featured a country or polka style double-time feeling at the end. This may have been a reference to the song being described as "country-ish". They also performed it as an encore at the Sydney Live Earth concert. At the 2005 ARIA Awards program, Neil Finn performed the song as a memorial to Paul Hester. It was performed as part of their setlist at the 2022 Glastonbury Festival.

== Track listings ==
All songs were written by Neil Finn. All tracks from the album Temple of Low Men except "Don't Dream It's Over" were recorded at The Roxy, Los Angeles, on 26 February 1987.

UK 7-inch and US cassette single

1. "Better Be Home Soon" – 3:08
2. "Kill Eye" – 3:12

UK 12-inch and CD single

1. "Better Be Home Soon" – 3:08
2. "Kill Eye" – 3:12
3. "Don't Dream It's Over" – 5:55 (live)
4. "Better Be Home Soon" – 3:08

== Charts ==
=== Weekly charts ===
Weekly chart performance for "Better Be Home Soon"
Chart (1988)	Peak position
Australia (ARIA)	2
Belgium (Ultratop 50 Flanders)	34
Canada Retail Singles (The Record)	1
Canada Top Singles (RPM)	8
Canada Adult Contemporary (RPM)	7
Italy Airplay (Music & Media)	12
Netherlands (Dutch Top 40)	35
Netherlands (Single Top 100)	31
New Zealand (Recorded Music NZ)	2
US Billboard Hot 100	42
US Adult Contemporary (Billboard)	26
US Album Rock Tracks (Billboard)	18
US Modern Rock Tracks (Billboard)	29
West Germany (GfK)	59

=== Year-end charts ===
Year-end chart performance for "Better Be Home Soon"
Chart (1988)	Position
Australia (ARIA)	10
Canada Top Singles (RPM)	73
New Zealand (RIANZ)	20

== Certifications ==
Certifications for "Better Be Home Soon"
Region	Certification	Certified units/sales
Australia (ARIA)	5× Platinum	350,000^{‡}
New Zealand (RMNZ)	3× Platinum	90,000^{‡}
^{‡} Sales+streaming figures based on certification alone.

== Cover versions ==
- The McCarters (peaked at number 73 on the Billboard Hot Country Singles & Tracks chart in 1990)
- George Canyon (peaked at number 87 on the Billboard Canadian Hot 100 in January 2011)
- Budjerah and WILSN released a version in June 2023 as part of the Mushroom Records' 50th anniversary celebration.
