= It's Only Natural (song) =

1991 single by Crowded House

Single by Crowded House

from the album Woodface
- B-side: "Fame Is"
- Released: 2 December 1991
- Label: Capitol
- Songwriters: Neil Finn; Tim Finn
- Producers: Mitchell Froom; Neil Finn

Crowded House singles chronology
"Fall at Your Feet" (1991)	"It's Only Natural" (1991)	"Weather with You" (1992)

"It's Only Natural" is a song by Australian rock band Crowded House from their third studio album, Woodface (1991). The single was originally issued as a promotional single in June 1991 with the intent to release the song as the lead single from Woodface; however, due to changes made, the commercial single wasn't released until December 1991 by Capitol Records, when it served as the third single from the album. In the UK, "It's Only Natural" was the fifth Woodface single, released in September 1992. The song reached number 15 in Australia, number 24 on the UK Singles Chart, and number five on the US Modern Rock Tracks chart.

== Reception ==
Junkee said the song was, "deservedly serving as one of [Crowded House's] most revered. Who else but Neil and Tim could put a minor fall after a major lift and still have it sound like pristine pop? Their omnipresent harmonies bolster the song's already-robust arrangement, creating something thoroughly distinctive and ultimately career-defining."

== Personnel ==
Crowded House

- Neil Finn – lead vocals, electric guitar
- Tim Finn – piano, acoustic guitar, backing vocals
- Nick Seymour – bass guitar, backing vocals
- Paul Hester – drums, keyboards, backing vocals

Additional musicians

- Mitchell Froom – keyboards
- Mark Hart – keyboards
- Alex Acuña – percussion
- Geoffrey Hales – percussion

== Track listings ==
- Australian CD one
1. "It's Only Natural" – 3:31
2. "Dr. Livingstone" – 3:57
3. "Fame Is" – 2:21
- Australian CD two
1. "It's Only Natural" – 3:31
2. "Recurring Dream"
3. "Hole in the River" (live)
4. "Better Be Home Soon"
5. "I Walk Away"
- 1992 European release
1. "It's Only Natural" – 3:31
2. "Fame Is" – 2:21
- UK 7-inch and cassette release
1. "It's Only Natural" – 3:31
2. "Chocolate Cake"
- UK CD one
1. "It's Only Natural" – 3:31
2. "It's Only Natural" – 6:21 (live, Sheffield City Hall, England 21 June 1992, incl "six months in a leaky boat")
3. "Hole in the River" – 5:58 (live, Cambridge Corn Exchange, England, 6 March 1992)
4. "The Burglar's Song" – 7:21 (medley) around the UK in 7 minutes, (live, at various locations on the Crowded House European Vacation tour, summer '92)
- UK CD two
1. "It's Only Natural" – 3:31
2. "Sister Madly" – 5:14 (live, Newcastle City Hall, England, 2 March 1992)
3. "There Goes God" – 5:35 (live, Brighton Centre, England, 7 July 1992)
4. "Chocolate Cake" – 5:45 (live, Wolverhampton Civic Hall, England, 18 June 1992)
- German CD
1. "It's Only Natural" – 3:31
2. "Fame Is" – 2:21
3. "Dr. Livingstone" – 3:57

== Charts ==
Weekly chart performance for "It's Only Natural"
Chart (1991–1992)	Peak position
Australia (ARIA)	15
Canada Top Singles (RPM)	55
Europe (Eurochart Hot 100)	67
Germany (GfK)	59
Netherlands (Dutch Top 40 Tipparade)	10
Netherlands (Single Top 100)	55
New Zealand (Recorded Music NZ)	31
UK Singles (Official Charts)	24
UK Airplay (Music Week)	11
US Modern Rock Tracks (Billboard)	5

== Certifications ==
Certifications and sales for "It's Only Natural"
Region	Certification	Certified units/sales
Australia (ARIA)	Platinum	70,000^{‡}
New Zealand (RMNZ)	Platinum	30,000^{‡}
^{‡} Sales+streaming figures based on certification alone.

== Release history ==
Release dates and formats for "It's Only Natural"
Region	Date	Format(s)	Label(s)	Ref.
Australia	2 December 1991	CD; cassette	Capitol	
United Kingdom	14 September 1992	7-inch vinyl; CD; cassette	Capitol	

== Cover versions ==
A re-recorded version featuring Tim Finn and Bic Runga appears on Tim Finn's 2009 greatest hits album North, South, East, West...Anthology.

In 2011, Lior and Emma Louise released a version, as a single from the album, They Will Have Their Way.
