= Something So Strong =

1987 single by Crowded House

- Artwork used in New Zealand, Australia and North America

Single by Crowded House

from the album Crowded House
- B-side: "I Walk Away"
- Released: 1 April 1987
- Studio: Capitol, Sunset Sound Factory (Los Angeles)
- Length: 2:51
- Label: Capitol
- Songwriters: Neil Finn, Mitchell Froom
- Producer: Mitchell Froom

Crowded House singles chronology
"Don't Dream It's Over" (1986)	"Something So Strong" (1987)	"Better Be Home Soon" (1988)

Music video
- "Something So Strong on YouTube

"Something So Strong" is a song written by Neil Finn and Mitchell Froom and performed by Crowded House for their eponymous debut album (1986). The track was released as the album's fifth and final single in April 1987. The single peaked at No. 18 on the Australian Music Report, No. 3 on New Zealand's RIANZ Singles Chart, and No. 7 on the US Billboard Hot 100.

The track lends its title to the book, Crowded House: Something So Strong (1997), by Australian biographer Chris Bourke, which details the band's career in the 1980s and 1990s. According to Bourke, "Something So Strong" was the first song written by Finn specifically for Crowded House. However, Froom and Finn reworked parts of the song; thus, Froom is credited as a co-writer.

== Music video ==
The music video for the song shows the band performing it in a barn. A classic American car is parked outside while they perform.

== Reception ==
"Something So Strong" has been described as a "gleaming pop gem" and as a "testament to the transformative power of love". Junkee said the song was "rightfully revered as a staple in the band's discography, but admittedly the shine of the original has worn off somewhat with its dated, reverb-heavy production".

== Later uses ==
The track is included in the various artists' 3× CD, Flood Relief: Artists for the Flood Appeal (January 2011), which raised money for victims of the Queensland floods.

== Track listings ==
"Something So Strong" written by Neil Finn and Mitchell Froom. All other songs written by Finn. All tracks from the album "Crowded House", except the two Live tracks on the UK 12" vinyl single, previously released on the "World Where You Live" US promo CD single.

Standard 7-inch vinyl single

1. "Something So Strong" – 2:51
2. "I Walk Away" – 3:05

US 12-inch vinyl single

1. "Something So Strong" – 2:51
2. "Can't Carry On" – 3:57
3. "I Walk Away" – 3:05

UK 12-inch vinyl single

1. "Something So Strong" – 2:51
2. "Something So Strong" – 4:02 (live at King Biscuit Flower Hour, The Trocadero, Philadelphia, 24 March 1987)
3. "I Walk Away" – 3:05
4. "Don't Dream It's Over" – 5:53 (live at The Roxy, Los Angeles, 26 February 1987)

== Personnel ==
- Neil Finn – lead vocals and backing vocals, electric guitar
- Nick Seymour – bass and backing vocals
- Paul Hester – drums and backing vocals
- Mitchell Froom – keyboards

== Charts ==
=== Weekly charts ===
Weekly chart performance for "Something So Strong"
Chart (1987)	Peak position
Australia (Australian Music Report)	18
Canada Top Singles (RPM)	10
Canada Adult Contemporary (RPM)	12
Israel (IBA)	32
New Zealand (Recorded Music NZ)	3
UK Singles (Official Charts)	95
US Billboard Hot 100	7
US Adult Contemporary (Billboard)	13
US Album Rock Tracks (Billboard)	10
US Cash Box Top 100	8

=== Year-end charts ===
Year-end chart performance for "Something So Strong"
Chart (1987)	Rank
Canada Top Singles (RPM)	65
US Billboard Hot 100	83

== Certifications ==
Certifications for "Something So Strong"
Region	Certification	Certified units/sales
Australia (ARIA)	2× Platinum	140,000^{‡}
New Zealand (RMNZ)	Platinum	30,000^{‡}
^{‡} Sales+streaming figures based on certification alone.
