= List of Australian films of 2013 =

== 2013 ==
Title	Director	Cast (subject of documentary)	Genre	Notes	Release date
Absolute Deception	Brian Trenchard-Smith	Cuba Gooding, Jr., Emmanuelle Vaugier	Action Thriller	Sony Pictures Home Entertainment	11 June
Around the Block	Sarah Spillane	Christina Ricci, Jack Thompson Damian Walshe-Howling, Matt Nable, Josh Quong Tart, Ruby Rose	Drama	Arclight Films	1 January
Blinder	Richard Gray	Oliver Ackland, Angus Sampson, Bobby Morley, Anna Hutchison, Rose McIver	Drama	Revival Films	7 March
Felony	Matthew Saville	Jai Courtney, Melissa George, Joel Edgerton, Tom Wilkinson	Thriller	Roadshow Films	13 September
Galore	Rhys Graham	Ashleigh Cummings, Aliki Matangi, Lily Sullivan	Drama	Film Camp	1 August
Goddess	Mark Lamprell	Ronan Keating, Magda Szubanski, Laura Michelle Kelly, Hugo Johnstone-Burt	Romance, comedy	Roadshow Films	14 March
The Great Gatsby	Baz Luhrmann	Leonardo DiCaprio, Joel Edgerton, Tobey Maguire, Carey Mulligan, Isla Fisher, Amitabh Bachchan	Drama	Warner Bros. Based on the novel of the same name by F. Scott Fitzgerald	30 May
Love of My Life	Michael Budd	Peter O'Brien, Diarmid Heidenreich, Michael Budd	Horror	Gravitas Ventures	8 November
Monster Pies	Lee Galea	Tristan Barr, Lucas Linehan	Romantic drama		
Mystery Road	Ivan Sen	Aaron Pedersen, Ryan Kwanten, Tasma Walton, Hugo Weaving, Robert Mammone, Tony Barry	Thriller	Screen Australia	15 August
Patrick	Mark Hartley	Sharni Vinson, Rachel Griffiths, Charles Dance, Peta Sergeant	Drama	Umbrella Entertainment; Remake of the 1978 film	27 July
The Railway Man	Jonathan Teplitzky	Nicole Kidman, Colin Firth Jeremy Irvine, Stellan Skarsgård	Drama	Lions Gate Entertainment	26 December
Red Obsession	David Roach	Includes interview with winemakers from around the world	Documentary	Lion Rock Films	3 October
Return to Nim's Island	Brendan Maher	Matthew Lillard, John Waters, Bindi Irwin	Adventure, fantasy	Arc Entertainment; Preceded by Nim's Island (2008)	28 March
Reverse Runner	Jarrod Theodore, Lachlan Ryan	Dave Callan, Bruce McAvaney Steve Moneghetti	Comedy	Pinnacle Films	21 February
The Rocket	Kim Mordaunt	Sitthiphon Disamoe, Loungnam Kaosainam, Suthep Po-ngam	Drama	Red Lamp Films	29 August
The Swimmer	Giovanni Basso	Tommaso Puccini, Daniel Wilkins, Adam T. Perkins, Olivia Charlotte	Drama	Magnet Films	21 March
Tracks	John Curran	Mia Wasikowska	Drama	Transmission Films; Based on the novel of the same name by Robyn Davidson	10 October
The Turning	Various	Collection of short stories by Tim Winton	Drama	Madman Entertainment	26 September
These Final Hours	Zak Hilditch	Nathan Phillips, Angourie Rice, Jessica De Gouw	apocalyptic thriller	Roadshow Films	2 August
Two Mothers	Anne Fontaine	Naomi Watts, Robin Wright, Ben Mendelsohn, Xavier Samuel, Jessica Tovey	Drama	Gaumont Films	14 November

== See also ==
- 2013 in Australia
- 2013 in Australian television
- List of 2013 box office number-one films in Australia
