= Emmanuel Mignot =

French sleep researcher

- Born: 1959 (age 66–67); Paris, France
- Education: Université Pierre and Marie Curie (PhD); Necker-Enfants Malades, Université René Descartes (MD); École Normale Supérieure
- Known for: Work on narcolepsy
- Medical career
- Profession: Medical doctor
- Institutions: Stanford Center for Sleep Sciences and Medicine
- Sub-specialties: Psychiatry
- Research: Sleep disorders

Emmanuel Mignot (born 1959) is an authority on sleep research and medicine, and is mostly known for his work on narcolepsy. He is the Craig Reynolds Professor of Sleep Medicine at Stanford Medical School, Stanford University.. He is a Professor in the departments of Psychiatry (primary), Neurology and Genetics.

== Career ==
Emmanuel Mignot completed his Science Doctorate in Molecular Pharmacology at the Université Pierre and Marie Curie and went to medical school at Necker-Enfants Malades, Université René Descartes, with subspecialisation in Psychiatry. Mignot is a former student of École Normale Supérieure (Ulm).

Mignot was appointed assistant professor of psychiatry and behavioral sciences at Stanford University in 1993, professor in 2001 and director of the Center for Sleep Sciences and Medicine in 2011, succeeding William C. Dement. Trained as a pharmacologist, he first deciphered the mode of action of modafinil, amphetamines, and antidepressants on narcolepsy symptoms, work that was done in close collaboration with Seiji Nishino.

Starting in 1990, he isolated the gene causing canine narcolepsy in doberman and Labrador dogs. Ten years later, this led to the discovery that mutations in the hypocretin (orexin) receptor 2 cause canine narcolepsy, and that human narcolepsy was caused by an immune mediated destruction of the hypocretin (orexin) producing cells in the brain Parallel work performed by Masashi Yanagisawa, Christopher Stinton and colleagues subsequently showed that hypocretin (orexin) deficient mice also have narcolepsy.

The autoimmune destruction of hypocretin (orexin) neurons in the hypothalamus was later shown by Han and Mignot to be at least partially precipitated by influenza A infections, notably the H1N1 2009 pandemic strain, complementing findings made in Northern Europe following the H1N1 Pandemrix vaccination campaign.

Mignot identified genetic factors predisposing to human narcolepsy, such as human leukocyte antigen HLA DQB1*06:02 and other genes and isolated the gene causing the methylopathy Autosomal Dominant Cerebelar Ataxia, Deafness and Narcolepsy (ADCA-DN), DNMT1.

=== Awards ===
Mignot has received National Sleep Foundation and National Institute of Health Research Awards, Howard Hughes Medical Institute Investigator and McKnight Neuroscience awards, the Narcolepsy Network professional service award, the Drs. C. and F. Demuth 11th Award for Young Investigators in the Neurosciences, the WC Dement Academic Achievement Award in sleep disorders medicine, the CINP and ACNP awards in neuropharmacology and the Jacobaeus prize. He is an elected member of the Association of American Physicians and of the Institute of Medicine of the National Academy of Sciences. He is the co-author of more than 200 scientific publications, and he serves on the editorial board of scientific journals in the field of sleep and biology research. Mignot has been past president of the Sleep Research society, chair the National Center on Sleep Disorders Research Advisory board of the National institutes of Health and chair of the Board of Scientific Counselors of the National Institute of Mental Health. In 2004 he was awarded W. Alden Spencer Award from Columbia University jointly with Thomas R. Insel. For 2023 he was awarded the Breakthrough Prize in Life Sciences for discovering that narcolepsy is caused by the loss of a small population of brain cells that make a wake-promoting substance, paving the way for the development of new treatments for sleep disorders. In 2026, he received the Albert Lasker Award for Basic Medical Research jointly with Masashi Yanagisawa.

== Bibliography ==
Mignot has written many published works in the field of sleep medicine.

== See also ==
- Narcolepsy
- Hypersomnia
- Kleine–Levin syndrome
