= Love of My Life =

Love of My Life may refer to:

== TV and film ==
- "Love of My Life" (That '70s Show), a television episode
- Love of My Life (Japanese TV series), a drama
- Love of My Life (2013 film), an Australian horror/thriller
- Love of My Life (2017 film), a Canadian comedy
- Love of My Life (Philippine TV series), a drama
- Jaane Jaan (lit. 'Love of My Life'), a 1983 Indian Hindi-language film
- Jaane Jaan (2023 film), an Indian mystery thriller

== Music ==
=== Albums ===
- Love of My Life (album), 2004, by Keith Martin
- Love of My Life (The Best of Dan Hill), an album by Dan Hill

=== Songs ===
- "Love of My Life", from the 1947 musical Brigadoon
- "Love of My Life", a 1958 song written by Bryant and Bryant first released as a B side of "Problems (The Everly Brothers song)"
- "Love of My Life", a song by Frank Zappa And The Mothers Of Invention on Cruising with Ruben & the Jets, 1968
- "Love of My Life" (Brian McKnight song), 2001
- "Love of My Life" (Carly Simon song), 1992
- "Love of My Life", a song by Gino Vannelli from The Gist of the Gemini, 1976
- "Love of My Life" (Queen song), 1975
- "Love of My Life" (Sammy Kershaw song), 1997
- "Love of My Life", a 1977 song by The Dooleys
- "Love of My Life (An Ode to Hip-Hop)", a 2002 song by Erykah Badu and Common
- "Love of My Life", a song written by Artie Shaw and Johnny Mercer for the 1940 film Second Chorus
- "Love of My Life", a song written by Cole Porter for the 1948 film The Pirate
- "Love of My Life", a song by Harry Styles from Harry's House, 2022
- "Love of My Life", a song by Santana, featuring Dave Matthews, from Supernatural, 1999
- "Love of My Life", a song by Stephanie Mills from Born for This!, 2004
- "Love of My Life", a song by Maya Hawke from Maitreya Corso, 2026

== See also ==
- "Loml", a song by Taylor Swift from the album The Tortured Poets Department (2024)
- "L'Amour de Ma Vie" ("The Love of My Life"), a song by Sherisse Laurence, Luxembourg's entry in the 1986 Eurovision Song Contest
- "L'Amour de Ma Vie", a song by Billie Eilish from Hit Me Hard and Soft (2024)
- El Amor de Mi Vida (disambiguation) (The Love of My Life)
- "(Not) The Love of My Life", a 2019 song by Yuna
