= Seiji =

- Gender: Male

Origin
- Origin: Japanese
- Meaning: Different meanings depending on the kanji used

Seiji (written: 誠二, 誠治, 誠史, 誠司, 誠次, 清二, 清治, 清次, 清志, 聖二, 聖治, 聖司, 征二, 征治, 征爾, 正慈, 成二, 精二, 菁児, 菁滋, 静児, 政二 or せいじ in hiragana) is a masculine Japanese given name. Notable people with the name include:

- Seiji Aochi (青地 清二; 1942–2008), Japanese ski jumper
- Seiji Ara (荒 聖治; born 1974), Japanese racing driver
- Seiji Arikawa (有川 清次; 1929–2016), Japanese politician
- Seiji Chiba (千葉 誠治; born 1964), Japanese film director and producer
- Seiji Chihara (千原 誠治; born 1963), Japanese rower
- Seiji Ebihara (海老原 清治; born 1949), Japanese golfer
- Seiji Fujie (藤江 精二; born 1941), Japanese basketball player
- Seiji Fukushi (福士 誠治; born 1983), Japanese actor
- Seiji Hagiwara (萩原 誠司; born 1956), Japanese politician
- Seiji Hamada (浜田 省司; born 1963), Japanese politician
- Seiji Hayami (早速 整爾; 1868-1926), Japanese politician
- Seiji Hibino (日比野 正嗣; born 1950), Japanese archer
- Seiji Hirao (平尾 誠二; born 1963), Japanese rugby union player
- Seiji Hisamatsu (久松 静児; 1912–1990), Japanese film director
- Seiji Honda (本田 征治; born 1976), Japanese footballer
- Seiji Inagaki (稲垣 誠司; born 1973), Japanese hurdler
- Seiji Isobe (磯部 清次; born 1948), Japanese karate instructor
- Seiji Isotani (磯谷 セイジ; born 1979), Brazilian scientist
- Seiji Kameda (亀田 誠治; born 1964), Japanese musician and record producer
- Seiji Kameyama (亀山 晴児; born 1979), Japanese rapper better known as WISE
- Seiji Kaneko (金古 聖司; born 1980), Japanese footballer
- Seiji Kanō (叶 精二), Japanese animation scholar and critic
- Seiji Katagiri (片桐 清二; born 1946), Japanese aviator
- Seiji Kawagoe (川越 誠司; born 1993), Japanese professional baseball outfielder
- Seiji Kawakami (川上 盛司; born 1995), Japanese footballer
- Seiji Kihara (木原 誠二; born 1970), Japanese politician
- Seiji Kihara (field hockey) (木原 征治; born 1941), Japanese field hockey player
- Seiji Kimura (木村 誠二; born 2001), Japanese footballer
- Seiji Kishi (岸 誠二), Japanese anime director
- Seiji Kobayashi (小林 誠司; born 1989), Japanese professional baseball player
- Seiji Koga (古賀 誠史; born 1979), Japanese footballer
- Seiji Komatsu (小松 正治; born 1992), Japanese sprint canoeist
- Seiji Kudo (工藤 誠二; born 1945), Japanese cross-country skier
- Seiji Kumagai (熊谷 誠二; born 1967), Japanese voice actor
- Seiji Kurata (倉田 精二; 1945-2020), Japanese photographer
- Seiji Kurihara (栗原 誠治; born 1948), Japanese former rugby union player
- Seiji Maeda (前田 誠二; born 1993), Japanese voice actor
- Seiji Maehara (前原 誠司; born 1962), Japanese politician
- Seiji Mataichi (又市 征治; born 1944), Japanese politician
- Seiji Matsunaga (松永 清志; born 1954), Japanese sport wrestler
- Seiji Matsuyama (松山 せいじ; born 1975), Japanese manga artist
- Seiji Miyaguchi (宮口 精二; 1913–1985), Japanese actor
- Seiji Miyane (宮根 誠司; born 1963), Japanese announcer, television presenter and professional wrestling promoter
- Seiji Mizushima (水島 精二; born 1966), Japanese anime director
- Seiji Morita (森田 清次), Japanese film editor
- Seiji Naito (内藤 誠二; born 1949), Japanese urologist
- Seiji Nakamura (仲村 正治; born 1931), Japanese politician
- Seiji Narita (成田 静司), Japanese former international table tennis player
- Seiji Naruse (成瀬 正二; 1893–1960), Japanese rear-admiral and engineer
- Seiji Nemoto (根本 誠次; born 1961), Japanese sport wrestler
- Seiji Nishimura (西村 誠司; born 1956), Japanese karateka
- Seiji Nishino (西野 精治; born 1955), Japanese neuroscientist and writer
- Seiji Noma (野間 清治; 1878–1938), Japanese writer and publisher
- Seiji Ogawa (小川 誠二; born 1934), Japanese biologist
- Seiji Oko (大古 誠司; born 1948), Japanese volleyball player
- Seiji Ono (小野 誠治; born 1956), Japanese table tennis player
- Seiji Osaka (逢坂 誠二; born 1959), Japanese politician
- Seiji Ozawa (小澤 征爾; 1935–2024), Japanese conductor
- Seiji Rokkaku (六角 精児; born 1962), Japanese actor
- Seiji Saito (斉藤 誠司; born 1986), Japanese footballer
- Seiji Sakaguchi (坂口 征二; born 1942), Japanese professional wrestler
- Seiji Sasaki (佐々木 誠二; born 1965), Japanese voice actor
- Seiji Shibata (柴田 征二; born 1938), Japanese fencer
- Seiji Shimota (霜多 正次; 1913–2003), Japanese novelist
- Seiji Shindo (進藤 誠司; born 1992), Japanese football player
- Seiji Shinkai (新海 征治; born 1944), Japanese chemist
- Seiji Suzuki (鈴木 政二; born 1948), Japanese politician
- Seiji Tahara (田原 誠次; born 1989), Japanese professional baseball pitcher
- Seiji Takahashi (高橋 聖二; born 1993), Japanese ice hockey player
- Seiji Takaiwa (高岩 成二; born 1968), Japanese actor
- Seiji Takaku, Japanese psychologist
- Seiji Takeda (竹田 菁滋; born 1960), Japanese television producer
- Seiji Tōgō (東郷 青児; 1897–1978), Japanese painter and artist
- Seiji Tomashino (笘篠 誠治; born 1964), Japanese former Nippon Professional Baseball infielder/outfielder
- Seiji Tsutsumi (堤 清二; 1927−2013), Japanese businessperson, author and poet
- Seiji Uebayashi (上林 誠知; born 1995), Japanese profesisonal baseball outfielder
- Seiji Ueda (上田 清二; born 1952), Japanese astronomer
- Seiji Yamada (山田 誠司; born 1966), Japanese ski mountaineer
- Seiji Yamamoto (山本 征治; born 1970), Japanese chef
- Seiji Yokoyama (横山 菁児; born 1935), Japanese composer
- Seiji Yoshida (吉田 清治; 1913–2000), Japanese writer and communist

== Fictional characters ==
- Seiji Matoba, the main antagonist of Natsume's Book of Friends
- Seiji Amasawa, one of the main characters of Whisper of the Heart
- Seiji Sagara, a supporting character in HappinessCharge PreCure!
- Seiji Nomi, one of antagonist of Accel World

== See also ==
- Celadon, known in Japanese as seiji (青磁)
