= Kate Walsh (actress) =

American actress (born 1967)

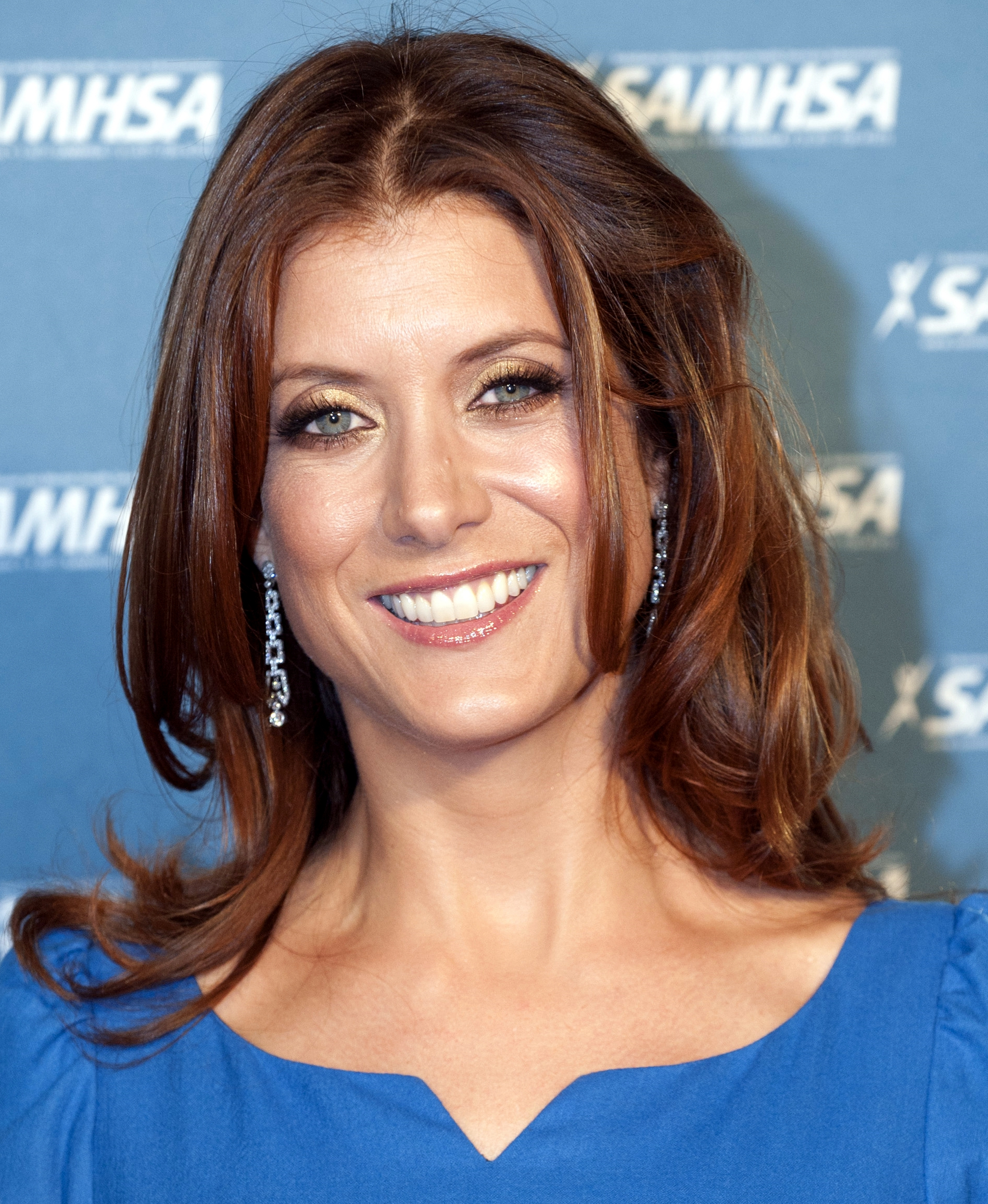
- Walsh in 2011
- Born: Kathleen Erin Walsh; October 13, 1967 (age 59); San Jose, California, U.S.
- Occupations: Actress; businesswoman
- Years active: 1995–present
- Spouse: Alex Young (m. 2007; div. 2010)
- Partner: Andrew Nixon (2020–present)

Kathleen Erin Walsh (born October 13, 1967) is an American actress and businesswoman. She is best known for her role as Dr. Addison Montgomery in the ABC medical drama series Grey's Anatomy (2005–2012, 2021–2023, 2026) and Private Practice (2007–2013).

Walsh is also known for her roles as Nicki Fifer in the ABC sitcom The Drew Carey Show (1997–2002), Rebecca Wright in the NBC legal sitcom Bad Judge (2014–2015), Olivia Baker in the Netflix teen drama series 13 Reasons Why (2017–2019), The Handler in the Netflix superhero drama series The Umbrella Academy (2019–2024), and Madeline Wheeler in the Netflix comedy-drama series Emily in Paris (2020–present).

== Early life ==
Walsh was born and raised in San Jose, California, the daughter of Angela and Joseph Patrick Walsh Sr. She grew up in a Catholic household in Tucson, Arizona. Her mother is of Italian descent, and her father was Irish, from Navan in County Meath.

Walsh graduated from Catalina Magnet High School and studied acting at the University of Arizona before dropping out. Walsh moved to New York City and joined a comedy troupe, Burn Manhattan, supporting herself by waitressing.

== Career ==
Walsh worked at fast-food outlets before modeling and teaching English in Japan in the 1980s. Later, she moved to Chicago and worked with the Piven Theatre Workshop. She performed on National Public Radio in the production of the radio play Born Guilty.

Walsh founded Boyfriend LLC, a beauty and lifestyle company, in 2010.

=== Television roles ===
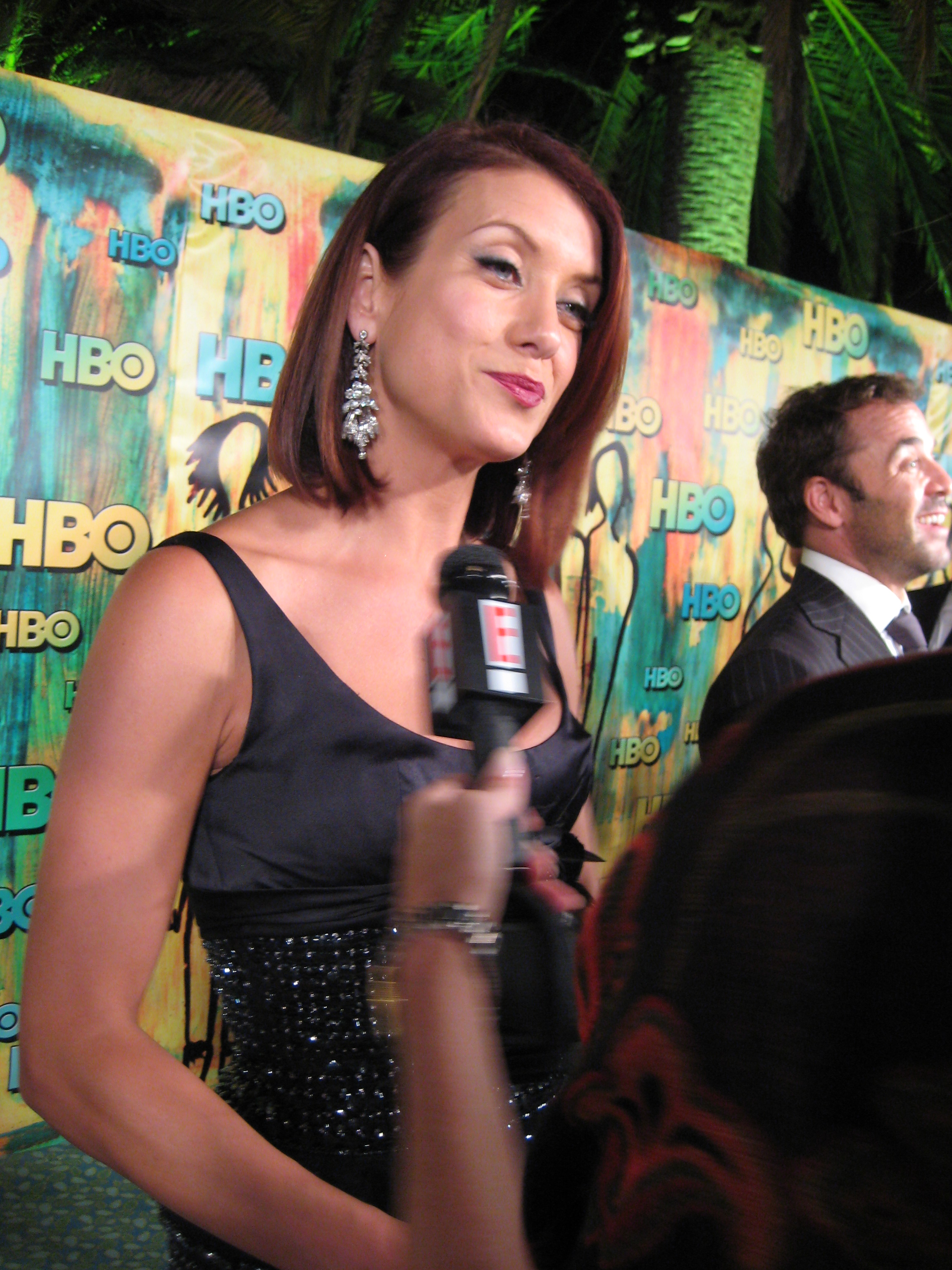
Walsh at the HBO Post-Emmys Party in 2008.

After playing Cathy Buxton in the Homicide: Life on the Street episode "Stakeout" in 1996 and Navy Lieutenant Kirstin Blair in the Law & Order episode "Navy Blues," Walsh's first major television appearance was in 1997, when she appeared on The Drew Carey Show as Drew Carey's love interest, Nicki Fifer. She wore a fatsuit in some episodes of the show.

Walsh went on to portray Carol Nelson in HBO's The Mind of the Married Man television series, and played Norm Macdonald's romantic interest in the sitcom The Norm Show. She made a guest appearance on CSI: Crime Scene Investigation as Mimosa, a transgender woman. She sometimes appeared in sketches on Late Night with Conan O'Brien.

Walsh had a recurring role on Karen Sisco as Detective Marley Novak in 2003 and 2004. In 2005, she was cast in her breakout role in the ABC series Grey's Anatomy, as Dr. Addison Montgomery, the estranged spouse of Derek Shepherd ("Dr. McDreamy," played by Patrick Dempsey). In February 2007, her Grey's Anatomy character received a spin-off of Grey's Anatomy that began airing in September 2007. Taye Diggs, Tim Daly, Amy Brenneman, Chris Lowell, and Audra McDonald were cast in the spin-off, Private Practice. Walsh would return for six episodes across the fourth through eighth seasons of Grey's Anatomy, including the musical episode "Song Beneath the Song."

On June 12, 2012, Walsh announced that the sixth season of Private Practice would be her final season. However, she mentioned she'd be open to reprise her role in Grey's Anatomy for a few guest spots.

In 2013, Walsh appeared in Full Circle, a 10-episode ensemble drama series created by Neil LaBute and airing on DirecTV's Audience Network channel.

In 2014, Walsh had a supporting role in the first season of FX's television series Fargo. She had a guest starring role in Hulu's original series The Hotwives of Orlando and later starred in the NBC series Bad Judge, which aired for one season. From 2017 to 2019, Walsh starred in the Netflix drama series 13 Reasons Why, as the mother of a child who dies by suicide. Her performance was met with critical acclaim, having been dubbed the "best work" of her career.

In 2019 and 2020, Walsh had a significant recurring role as "the Handler" in the Netflix series The Umbrella Academy. Her most recent role has been on Netflix Original, Emily in Paris, where she plays Emily's boss who gets pregnant and can no longer move to Paris for their marketing job, so she sends Emily instead. In September 2021, Walsh announced she would be reprising her role as Dr. Addison Montgomery in the eighteenth season of Grey's Anatomy in a guest starring role.

In 2026, it was announced that Walsh would play the lead role in CBS sitcom pilot The Tillbrooks.

=== Film roles ===
In 1995, Walsh starred in her first film. Normal Life, a crime drama, was her film debut; she played the sister of a bank robber played by Luke Perry. In Peppermills, she portrayed a kleptomaniac. Walsh appeared in the film Henry: Portrait of a Serial Killer, Part II. She gained attention in a major Hollywood production as Will Ferrell's character's wife in the family comedy, Kicking & Screaming. Walsh has appeared in several other films with Ferrell, including Bewitched and in Wake Up, Ron Burgundy: The Lost Movie, an "alternate film" to Anchorman.

In 2003, Walsh appeared in Under the Tuscan Sun. Regarding her lesbian roles, Walsh said: "Do I give off a girl-on-girl vibe, I wonder? Or is it because I'm tall? I guess the chicks just dig me!"

Walsh was set to star opposite John Cusack in the supernatural thriller 1408, but had to drop out due to scheduling conflicts. Walsh starred in the biblical horror film Legion, that was released on January 22, 2010. She played Charlie's mother in The Perks of Being a Wallflower.

=== Theatre ===
In May 2010, Walsh made her off-Broadway debut opposite Paul Sparks in Atlantic Theater Company's world premiere of Stephen Belber's Dusk Rings a Bell. The new play began previews on May 19 and opened May 27 at Atlantic Stage 2 and played through June 26. The New York Times called it "a sublime, beautifully acted drama." She also had a long theater career in Chicago, which included roles in Happy Birthday Wanda June, The Danube, Moon Under Miami and Troilus and Cressida. In New York, Walsh was a member of the improvisational comedy troupe Burn Manhattan and the New York City Players theater ensemble.

== Personal life ==
Walsh married 20th Century Fox executive Alex Young on September 1, 2007. On December 11, 2008, Young filed for divorce, citing irreconcilable differences; the official date of separation in the divorce petition was listed as November 22. On December 24, 2008, Walsh counterfiled for divorce, contesting the date of separation listed in Young's divorce papers. The divorce was finalized on February 5, 2010.

In October 2022, Walsh revealed she was engaged to Australian farmer Andrew Nixon. Walsh resides in Perth, Western Australia.

=== Health ===
In September 2017, Walsh revealed that she was diagnosed with a benign meningioma in 2015. She underwent surgery for removal of the tumor and took a nine-month break to recover. She underwent a hip replacement in November 2019.

== Social and political activism ==
Since the summer of 2007, Walsh has been the spokesperson for Narcolepsy Network, working to promote national awareness of narcolepsy through infomercials and DVDs. In January 2008, Walsh participated in a video for Democratic presidential candidate Barack Obama called "Yes We Can," produced by will.i.am of the Black Eyed Peas. She also campaigned for Obama in Arizona, Texas, Nevada, and Pennsylvania.

In July 2008, Walsh was nominated as a candidate on the Unite for Strength slate for a place on the national governing board of the Screen Actors Guild (SAG) in elections scheduled for September 18, 2008. On September 18, 2008, Walsh was elected to serve on the SAG board for a three-year term.

Walsh supports pet adoption and frequently campaigns for the cause. On February 7, 2008, she cut the ribbon to a new dog adoption center in Times Square. In 2005, Walsh joined the Planned Parenthood Federation of America (PPFA)'s Board of Advocates, and in 2008 received the PPFA Maggie Award for an Artist who Stands Up for Reproductive Health and Freedom. She has participated in numerous Planned Parenthood activities, including national fundraisers, local Planned Parenthood affiliate events, the PPFA Awards Gala, and lobby day on Capitol Hill promoting the need for comprehensive sex education. In January 2009, she spoke at the Planned Parenthood Presidential Inauguration Brunch in Washington, D.C.

As announced in late 2009, Walsh partnered with ocean conservancy and advocacy group Oceana to call for increased sea turtle protections. She joined experts from the group on a trip to the Virgin Islands to witness the turtles' hatching and moving to the sea.

During the 2016 election, Walsh was a supporter of Hillary Clinton, publicly endorsing her and campaigning for her several times in California, Arizona, New Hampshire, and Virginia.

== Filmography ==
=== Film ===
Year	Title	Role	Notes
1996	Normal Life	Cindy Anderson	
1997	Peppermills	Lena	
1997	Night of the Lawyers	Pressie Brooks (Biker)	
1998	Henry: Portrait of a Serial Killer, Part II	Cricket	
1998	Three Below Zero	Moirat	
1998	Heaven	Diner	
2000	The Family Man	Jeannie	
2002	Anatomy of a Breakup	Lorra	
2002	A Day in the Life of Nancy M. Pimental	Kate	
2003	Under the Tuscan Sun	Grace	
2004	After the Sunset	Shelia	
2004	Wake Up, Ron Burgundy: The Lost Movie	Sue	Direct-to-DVD
2005	Kicking & Screaming	Barbara Weston	
2005	Inside Out	Tyne	
2005	Bewitched	Sexy Waitress	
2007	Veritas, Prince of Truth	Nemesii	
2009	One Way to Valhalla	Raina	
2010	Legion	Sandra Anderson	
2011	Angels Crest	Roxanne	
2012	The Perks of Being a Wallflower	Mrs. Kelmeckis	
2013	Scary Movie 5	Mal Colb	
2014	Dermaphoria	Morell	
2015	Just Before I Go	Kathleen Morgan	
2015	Staten Island Summer	Danny's Mom	
2015	Any Day	Bethley	
2017	Girls Trip	Liz Davelli	
2017	Mark Felt: The Man Who Brought Down the White House	Pat Miller	
2017	Reality High	Dr. Fiona Shively	
2017	If I Forget	Holly Fischer	
2018	Ideal Home	Kate	
2019	Almost Love	Elizabeth	
2019	3022	Jackie Miller	
2020	Honest Thief	Annie Wilkins	
2021	Sometime Other Than Now	Kate	
TBA	What the F*ck Is My Password	TBA	Filming

=== Television ===
Year	Title	Role	Notes
1996	Homicide: Life on the Street	Cathy Buxton	Episode: "Stakeout"
1996	Swift Justice	Paula "Paulie" Goddard	Episode: "The Haze"
1997	Law & Order	Lt. Kirstin Blair	Episode: "Navy Blues"
1997–2002	The Drew Carey Show	Nicki Fifer	Recurring role; 22 episodes
1998	Cupid	Heidi	Episode: "Meat Market"
1999	Turks	Terry	1 episode
1999	The Mike O'Malley Show	Marcia	Episodes: "Pilot", "Out of Their League"
2000	Cursed	Stace	Episode: "...And Then He Had to Give a Thumbs Up"
2000–2001	The Norm Show	Jenny	Recurring role; 5 episodes
2001	The Fugitive	Agent Eve Hilliard	Recurring role; 3 episodes
2001	The Mind of the Married Man	Carol Nelson	Recurring role; 6 episodes
2003–2004	Karen Sisco	Marley Novak	Episode: "Nobody's Perfect", "No One's Girl"
2004	The Men's Room	Karen	Recurring role; 3 episodes
2004	CSI: Crime Scene Investigation	Mimosa	Episode: "Ch-Ch-Changes"
2004	Complete Savages	Maggie	Episode: "My Two Sons"
2005	Bobby Cannon	London	Television film
2005	Eyes	Kendall Judd	Episode: "Wings"
2005–2012, 2021–2023, 2026	Grey's Anatomy	Dr. Addison Montgomery	Main role (seasons 2–3); Special guest star (seasons 1, 4–8, 18–19, 22); 67 episodes
2007–2013	Private Practice	Dr. Addison Montgomery	Main role; 111 episodes
2008	Upright Citizens Brigade: Asssscat	Guest Monologist	Television film
2009	King of the Hill	Kat Savage (voice)	Episode: "Uncool Customer"
2010	Childrens Hospital	Herself	Episode: "The End of the Middle"
2011	Comedy Central Roast of Charlie Sheen	Roaster	Television special
2013	Full Circle	Trisha Campbell	Recurring role; 3 episodes
2014	Fargo	Gina Hess	Recurring role; 4 episodes
2014–2015	Bad Judge	Rebecca Wright	Lead role; 13 episodes Also executive producer
2015	Undateable	Customer	Episode: "A Live Show Walks Into a Bar"
2017–2019	13 Reasons Why	Olivia Baker	Main role (seasons 1–2), guest (season 3); 27 episodes
2019	Fam	Jolene	Episode: "Jolene, Jolene..."
2019–2024	The Umbrella Academy	The Handler	Recurring role (season 1), Main role (season 2), Guest role (seasons 3–4); 15 episodes
2020–2022	Emily in Paris	Madeline Wheeler	Recurring role (season 1–3); 8 episodes
2022	Sprung	Paula Tackleberry	Recurring role; 5 episodes
2025	Optics	Hannah Halston	Guest: Episode 2
2026	The Tillbrooks	Jocelyn Tillbrooks	Lead role
