= Ruby's Choice =

Australian film

- Directed by: Michael Budd
- Written by: Paul Mahoney
- Produced by: Michael Budd; Jessica Butland; Holly Brisley
- Starring: Jane Seymour; Jacqueline McKenzie; Stephen Hunter; Coco Jack Gillies
- Release dates: 22 February 2022 (Hayden Orpheum Picture Palace); 3 March 2022 (Australia)
- Country: Australia
- Language: English

Ruby's Choice is a 2022 Australian drama directed by Michael Budd and produced by Michael Budd and Jessica Butland, and Holly Brisley. It stars Jane Seymour, Jacqueline McKenzie, Stephen Hunter and Coco Jack Gillies. Written by Paul Mahoney, the film was financed by philanthropist Sir Owen Glenn of the Glenn Family Foundation.

It follows Ruby (played by Seymour) as a woman with early dementia and its impact on her and her family when she is no longer able to live independently. It showcases that people living with dementia can still offer a meaningful contribution to those around them as a person with memories, emotions and value.

The film had its world premiere on 22 February 2022, at the Hayden Orpheum Picture Palace and is set to be theatrically released across Australia and New Zealand on 3 March 2022.

On 7 March 2022, Ruby's Choice premiered in Santa Barbara, California at the 37th Santa Barbara International Film Festival where it was Nominee Best International Feature Film. On 24 September 2023 at the Burbank International Film Festival (BIFF), Michael Budd, a director and producer based in Sydney, won Best Foreign Film and Best Feature Film with Ruby's Choice. The event coincided with the honouring of the legendary filmmaker Tim Burton.

The film aired on channel nine in Australia.

Ruby's Choice was released in North America on May 7, 2024.

== Plot ==
Ruby, a sweet creative elderly lady who lives alone, has undiagnosed dementia. After she accidentally burns her house down, she is forced to shift into her daughter Sharon's crowded home and share her granddaughter Tash's bedroom. Tash goes from hating Ruby to loving her as she learns more about some family secrets, and she becomes Ruby's fiercest advocate when Sharon thinks it is time for a nursing home. Unable to access services required to keep Ruby safe, Sharon is faced with the ultimate dilemma to go against Ruby's wishes or do what she thinks is best for her mother.

== Cast ==
- Jane Seymour as Ruby
- Jacqueline McKenzie as Sharon
- Coco Jack Gillies as Tash
- Stephen Hunter as Doug
- Nicole Pastor as Adult Tash
- Brendan Donoghue as Ken
- Rory Potter as Ned
- Sam Rechner as Jack
- Michael Budd as Zane
- Kate Ryerson as Lisa

The production was halted due to COVID-19 and moved from Queensland to Windsor to complete filming under strict COVID guidelines in August 2020. Budd described shooting a feature film in the middle of a pandemic as the most challenging of any of his past feature films.

== Release ==
Ruby's Choice was screened at the Margaret River HEART for CinefestOZ on Sunday 29 August 2021, before its world premiere on February 22, 2022, at the Hayden Orpheum Picture Palace. Ruby's Choice was theatrically released across Australia and New Zealand on March 3, 2022.

== Reception ==
Marina Marangos of Weekend Notes wrote that the film "handles the difficult subject of dementia with honesty" and provides "a new and heartwarming message about how sometimes we should look beyond the difficulties and see the messages of hope and love through the eyes and lives of people living with dementia".

== Awards and nominations ==
- Nominee: Santa Barbara, California at the 37th Santa Barbara International Film Festival, "Best International Feature Film"
- Nominee: Film Critics Circle of Australia FCCA Award Best Actor – Supporting Role Stephen Hunter
- Winner: Australian Screen Industry Network Feature Film Ruby's Choice
- Winner: Australian Screen Industry Network best actress Jane Seymour Ruby's Choice
- Nominee: Australian Screen Industry Network Best Director Michael Budd Ruby's Choice
