= Among Angels =

Among Angels may refer to:

- "Among Angels" (song), a song by Kate Bush
- Among Angels (book), a book by the actress Jane Seymour
