= Sam Rechner =

Australian actor

- Born: Sydney, Australia
- Education: Knox Grammar School
- Occupation: Actor
- Notable work: The Fabelmans

Sam Rechner is an Australian actor. He is best known for playing Logan Hall in Steven Spielberg's film The Fabelmans (2022) and Ben Brown in Scream 7 (2026).

== Early life ==
Rechner is from Sydney. He attended Knox Grammar School in Wahroonga, New South Wales where he was a keen rugby union player.

== Career ==
Rechner made his feature film debut in the Jane Seymour led Australian drama Ruby's Choice.

Reichner was 21 years old when he was cast as Logan Hall in Steven Spielberg's semi-autobiographical film The Fabelmans' in June 2021. This was the actor's first gig as a professional actor. The character is based on a student who levied anti-Semitic bullying towards Spielberg during his high school years in real life. Rechner auditioned remotely during the COVID-19 pandemic via a zoom interview with Spielberg. To leave Australia at the time he had to apply for special exemption, and this only came through the day before he was flying to the United States to work on the film. It premiered at the Toronto International Film Festival on September 10, 2022 and was released in theaters in November 2022. The scene involving Logan confronting the protagonist Sammy Fabelman (Gabriel LaBelle) over the way the latter portrayed him in the "Ditch Day" film and the two of them ultimately coming to an understanding was selected by Slant Magazine and Polygon as among the best movie scenes of 2022.

In July 2023, Rechner was cast on the second season of the Netflix teen drama series Heartbreak High as Rowan Callaghan. It was released on 11 April 2024.

In December 2023, the actor was awarded GQ's Man of the Year award for "Breakthrough Actor of the Year" with the award presented by fellow Heartbreak High co-star Josh Heuston who had won the same award the previous year.

In November 2024, Rechner was announced as a cast member in independent drama And Out Comes The Wolf, based on the Rancid 1995 album of the same name. In December 2024, it was announced that Rechner would appear in Scream 7.

== Personal life ==
He is the nephew of Australian television presenters Peter Overton and Jessica Rowe. He has a twin brother who studies at university in Sydney. Nicole Kidman is a friend of his family. Rechner attended the 95th Academy Awards in 2023 with Kidman and her husband Keith Urban.

== Filmography ==
Key
†	Denotes works that have not yet been released

Year	Title	Role	Notes
2021	Ruby's Choice	Jack	
2022	The Fabelmans	Logan Hall	
2024	Heartbreak High	Rowan Callaghan	Season 2; Main role
2025	And Out Comes The Wolf	TBA	
2026	Scream 7	Ben Brown	
TBA	Untitled Mike Thornton biopic film †	TBA	Filming
