= Sinbad and the Minotaur =

- Film poster
- Directed by: Karl Zwicky
- Written by: Jim Noble
- Produced by: Grant Bradley; Dana Dubovsky; Mark L. Lester
- Starring: Manu Bennett; Holly Brisley; Steven Grives
- Cinematography: Nino Gaetano Martinetti
- Edited by: Brad Lindenmayer
- Music by: Garry McDonald; Laurie Stone
- Release date: 21 May 2011
- Running time: 88 minutes
- Country: Australia
- Language: English

Sinbad and the Minotaur is a 2011 Australian fantasy B movie directed by Karl Zwicky serving as an unofficial sequel to the 1947 Douglas Fairbanks Jr. film and Harryhausen's Sinbad trilogy. It combines Arabian Nights hero Sinbad the Sailor with the Greek legend of the Minotaur.

== Plot ==
Sinbad, his first mate Karim and slave girl Tara embark on a voyage to Crete in search of King Minos's treasure believed to be hidden within the fabled Labyrinth. They are pursued by the evil Sorcerer Al Jibbar who bears a striking resemblance to Sokurah, the antagonist of the Seventh Voyage of Sinbad. Al Jibbar's cannibal henchman is seemingly immortal, capable of surviving grievous wounds and highly skilled in the ways of the Indian Jettis, strongmen capable of torturing and killing prisoners with their bare hands.

The story begins where Sinbad enters Al-Jibar's camp. There, he meets Tara and 3 other harem belly dancers. Tara tells Sinbad that the 3 women were hypnotized by Al-Jibar and that she is looking for someone to rescue her. Sinbad refuses to rescue her so Tara screams. Al-Jibar and his henchmen come in. Tara lies about seeing a rat. Serif finds Sinbad. Sinbad and Tara escape.

== Cast ==
- Manu Bennett as Sinbad
- Steven Grives as Al Jibbar
- Pacharo Mzembe as Karim
- Holly Brisley as Tara, former slave, Princess of Lycia, and Sinbad's love interest.
- Jared Robinsen as Seif
- Terry Antionak as Nestor
- Lily Brown Griffiths as Ariana
- Derek Boyer as Akroom
- Hugh Parker as Boz
- Brad Mcmurry as Timos
- Lauren Horner as Luna, a belly dancing girl
- Nick Pendragon as the Feast Master
- Dimitri Baveas as Pericles
- David Vallon as Minos
- Vivienne Albitia as Serving Wench
- Sam Elia as Hajibi
- Anthony Thomas as Al Jibbar's sentry
- Selwi Greensill, Rebecca Convoy, and Fleur Thompson as belly dancing slave girls
