= Alex Young (studio executive) =

American film and television producer (born 1971)

- Born: Alexander Morgan Young; August 29, 1971 (age 55); London, England
- Education: Williams College (BA)
- Occupation: Film producer
- Spouse: Kate Walsh (m. 2007; div. 2010)

Alexander Morgan Young (born August 29, 1971) is an American film and television producer. He was co-president of Production at 20th Century Fox.

== Early life ==
Young was born in London, and grew up in Cooperstown, New York and New York City. He attended Choate Rosemary Hall high school and graduated with honors from Williams College in 1993, with a dual degree in Political Science and History. Young's father was British entrepreneur Paul Young, who owned the New York City boutique Paraphernalia in the 1960s and was credited with bringing mod fashion, including the mini skirt trend, from London to America. His father died in 2003. He has one sister, Stephanie Tyrer. He currently resides in Los Angeles.

== Career ==
Young worked at an oil parts company in Tulsa, Oklahoma to pay for college. After college he moved to Los Angeles and his first job was as a runner on the Chevy Chase talk show. When struggling to find work at the end of this show, his father put him in touch with his old colleague Joel Schumacher. Schumacher introduced him to people in the industry and he got a job as an assistant to a creative executive at Paramount. The following year he became assistant to John Goldwyn (former Paramount executive). He was promoted Creative Executive and then vice-president of Production at Paramount, where he was involved in projects such as Lara Croft: Tomb Raider, The Sum of All Fears, Sleepy Hollow, Star Trek: First Contact, The Talented Mr. Ripley, Paycheck and Deep Impact. In February 2002, Hutch Parker brought Young across to 20th Century Fox where he was named vice-president of Production. Young rose from Vice President to Senior Vice President to Executive Vice President, working on films such as X-Men 2: X-Men United, X-Men: The Last Stand, Live Free or Die Hard, and Fantastic Four. In January 2007, Young was promoted along with Emma Watts to become co-president of Production at 20th Century Fox. Becoming a producer at Fox in 2010, Young has produced Unstoppable, The A-Team, Wall Street: Money Never Sleeps, Predators, A Good Day to Die Hard, and Hitman: Agent 47.

== Personal life ==
In April 2007, Young began dating Private Practice star Kate Walsh. They were first spotted having lunch together on April 26, and then went public with their relationship on April 28 by attending a Barack Obama fund-raiser in Los Angeles, which was co-hosted by Young. Young proposed to Walsh during a trip to San Francisco in May. They later married on September 1, 2007, at the Ojai Presbyterian Church in Ojai, north of Los Angeles. On December 11, 2008, Young filed for divorce after 15 months of marriage citing irreconcilable differences; the official date of separation in the divorce petition was listed as November 22. The divorce was finalized February 5, 2010.

== Filmography ==
He was a producer in all films unless otherwise noted.

=== Film ===
Year	Film	Credit	Ref.
2010	Wall Street: Money Never Sleeps	Executive producer	
2010	The A-Team		
2010	Predators	Executive producer	
2010	Unstoppable		
2013	A Good Day to Die Hard		
2015	Hitman: Agent 47		
2019	Ford v Ferrari	Executive producer	
2026	War Machine		
2027	Karoshi		
TBA	Rabbids	Executive Producer	
TBA	Untitled Mike Thornton biopic film		
