= Jane Seymour (actress) =

American-English actress (born 1951)

Jane Seymour OBE
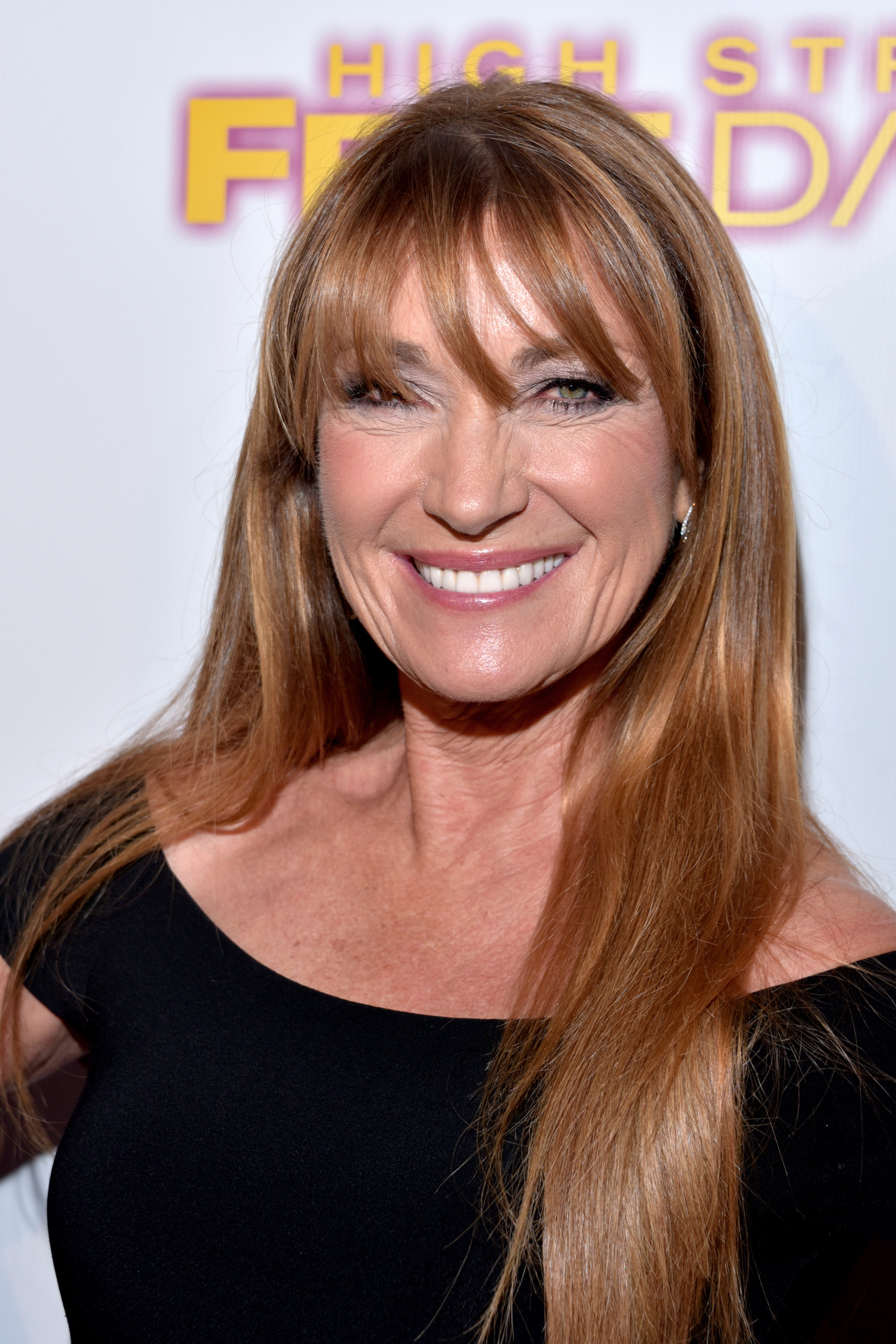
- Seymour in 2019
- Born: Joyce Penelope Wilhelmina Frankenberg; 15 February 1951 (age 75); Uxbridge, Middlesex, England
- Citizenship: United Kingdom; United States (after 2005)
- Occupations: Actress; author
- Years active: 1968–present
- Spouses: Michael Attenborough (m. 1971; div. 1973) Geoffrey Planer (m. 1977; div. 1978) David Flynn (m. 1981; div. 1992) James Keach (m. 1993; div. 2015)
- Children: 4
- Website: www.janeseymour.com

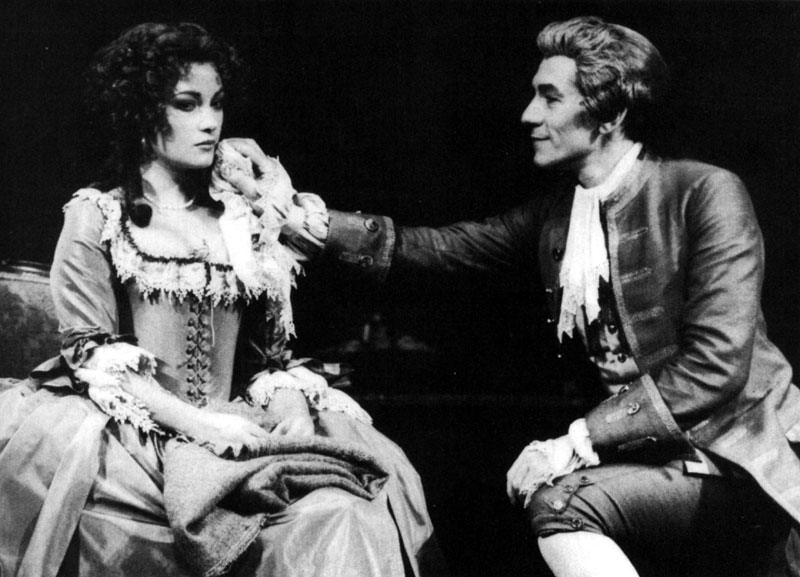
Seymour (Constanze Mozart) alongside Ian McKellen (Antonio Salieri) in Amadeus, c. 1981

Jane Seymour OBE (born Joyce Penelope Wilhelmina Frankenberg; 15 February 1951) is an English and American actress and author. After making her screen debut as an uncredited teenage extra in the 1969 musical comedy Oh! What a Lovely War, Seymour moved to roles in film and television, including a leading role in the television series The Onedin Line (1972–1973), the role of psychic Bond girl Solitaire in the James Bond film Live and Let Die (1973) and as Serina in the original 1978 series of Battlestar Galactica.

Critical acclaim came with a nomination for the Primetime Emmy Award for Outstanding Lead Actress in a Limited Series for her role in Captains and the Kings (1976). In 1982, Seymour won her first Golden Globe Award for Best Actress in a Miniseries or Motion Picture Made for Television for her role in the miniseries East of Eden (1981). She received three additional Golden Globe nominations in that same category: one for her portrayal of Wallis Simpson in the television film The Woman He Loved (1988), and another two (in consecutive years) for her role in the miniseries War and Remembrance (1988-1989). Her War and Remembrance role also garnered her a nomination for the Primetime Emmy Award for Outstanding Lead Actress in a Miniseries or Special.

Seymour also won a Primetime Emmy Award for Outstanding Supporting Actress in a Miniseries or Special for her portrayal of Maria Callas in Onassis: The Richest Man in the World (1988).

In 1993, Seymour was cast as Dr. Michaela Quinn in the television series Dr. Quinn, Medicine Woman, a medical drama set in the 1860s Wild West. For her performance in this role, over the course of its six-season run, she received nominations twice for the Primetime Emmy Award for Outstanding Lead Actress in a Drama Series, twice for the Screen Actors Guild Award for Outstanding Performance by a Female Actor in a Drama Series, and four times for the Golden Globe Award for Best Actress in a Television Series – Drama, winning one of the latter awards.

She later earned a star on the Hollywood Walk of Fame, and, in 2000, was appointed an Officer of the Order of the British Empire.

Seymour also had roles in numerous films, including Somewhere in Time (1980), The Scarlet Pimpernel (1982), La Révolution française (1989), Wedding Crashers (2005), Love, Wedding, Marriage (2011), Little Italy (2018), The War with Grandpa (2020) and Friendsgiving (2020).

In addition to her acting career, Seymour established a nonprofit, the Open Hearts Foundation, co-authored several children's books and self-help books, and created jewellery, scarves, furniture, rugs, handbags, paintings and sculptures under the label Jane Seymour Designs.

== Early life ==
Joyce Penelope Wilhelmina Frankenberg was born on 15 February 1951 in Uxbridge, Middlesex (now part of Greater London), England, to Mieke van Tricht (1914–2007), a nurse, and Benjamin John Frankenberg FRCOG (1914–1990), a gynaecologist and obstetrician. Her father was Jewish; born in England to a family from Nowe Trzepowo, a village in Poland. Her mother was a Dutch Protestant (with family from Deventer) who was a prisoner of war during World War II, and had lived in the Dutch East Indies (now Indonesia). Seymour stated that she had learned Dutch from her mother and the fellow survivors from the Japanese internment camp, who frequently spent holidays together in the Netherlands, when she was a child. Encouraged by her parents, who sent her to live with family friends in Geneva to practise her languages, she learned to speak fluent French.

Her paternal grandfather Lee Grahame had come to live in the East End of London, after escaping the Czarist pogroms when he was just fourteen years old. He is listed in the 1911 census as living in Bethnal Green, working as a hairdresser, after which he went on to establish his own company. Seymour's father Benjamin qualified at the UCL Medical School in 1938 and joined the medical branch of the RAFVR after the outbreak of war, serving in England, Belgium, Italy and South Africa. He ended his service as a squadron leader with a mention in despatches. After the war, Frankenberg continued his career at various London hospitals, including St Leonard's Hospital, Hackney, the East End Maternity Hospital, the City of London Maternity Hospital and finally Hillingdon Hospital, for which he designed the maternity unit. A close associate of Patrick Steptoe, he assisted in pioneering discussions on in-vitro fertilisation and published papers on adolescent and teenage sexual behaviours.

Seymour was educated at Tring Park School for the Performing Arts in Hertfordshire. She chose the screen name Jane Seymour after the English queen Jane Seymour because it seemed more saleable. One of her notable features is heterochromia, with her right eye brown and her left eye green.

== Acting career ==
In 1969, Seymour appeared uncredited in her first film, Richard Attenborough's Oh! What a Lovely War. In 1970, she appeared in her first major film role in the war drama The Only Way. Playing Lillian Stein, a Jewish woman seeking shelter from Nazi persecution. In 1973, she gained her first major television role as Emma Callon in the successful 1970s series The Onedin Line. During this time, she appeared as the female lead Prima, in the two-part television miniseries Frankenstein: The True Story. Later appearing as Winston Churchill's girlfriend Pamela Plowden in Young Winston, produced by her father-in-law Richard Attenborough.

In 1973, she achieved international fame in her role as Bond girl Solitaire in the James Bond film Live and Let Die. IGN ranked her as 10th in a Top 10 Bond Babes list. In 1975, she was cast as Princess Farah in Sinbad and the Eye of the Tiger, the third part of Ray Harryhausen's Sinbad trilogy. Filmed in 1975, it was not released until its stop motion animation sequences had been completed in 1977. Then in 1978, she appeared as Serina in the Battlestar Galactica film, and in the first five episodes of the television series. She later returned to the big screen in the comedy Oh Heavenly Dog opposite Chevy Chase.

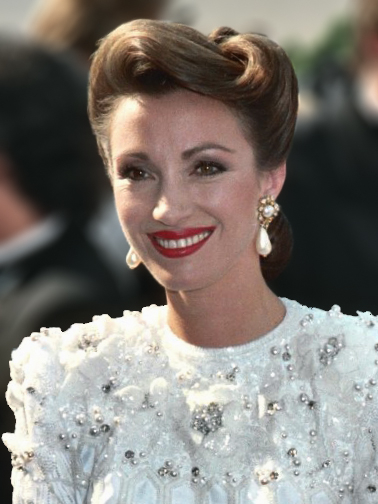
Seymour at the Emmy Awards, 1988

In 1980, she played the role of Constanze on stage in Peter Shaffer's play Amadeus, opposite Ian McKellen as Salieri with Tim Curry as Mozart. The play premiered on Broadway in 1980, running for 1,181 performances. It was nominated for seven Tony Awards, of which it won five.

Also in 1980, she was given the role of young theatre actress Elise McKenna in the period romance Somewhere in Time. Although the film was made with a limited budget, the role enticed her with a character she'd felt she knew. The effort was a break from her earlier work and marked the start of her friendship with co-star Christopher Reeve.

In 1981, she appeared in the television film East of Eden, based on the novel by John Steinbeck. Her portrayal of main antagonist Cathy Ames which won her a Golden Globe. In 1982, she appeared in The Scarlet Pimpernel with Anthony Andrews, and her Amadeus costar Ian McKellen. In 1984, she appeared nude in the film Lassiter, co-starring Tom Selleck. However, the film was a box office flop. In 1987, she was the subject of a pictorial in Playboy magazine, although she did not pose nude.

In 1988 she won the female lead in the twelve-part television miniseries War and Remembrance, the continued story from the miniseries The Winds of War, playing Natalie Henry, an American Jewish woman trapped in Europe during World War II. That same year, she won an Emmy Award for playing Maria Callas in the television movie Onassis: The Richest Man in the World.

In 1989, on the occasion of the 200th anniversary of the French Revolution, she appeared in the television film La révolution française, filmed in both French and English. Then she appeared as the doomed French queen, Marie Antoinette; her two children, Katherine and Sean, appear as the queen's children.

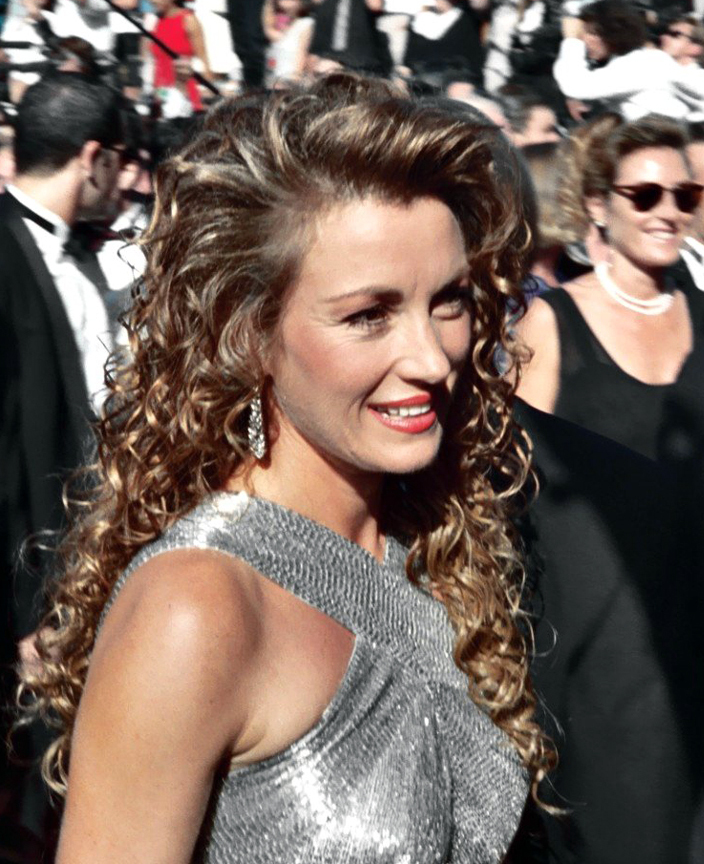
Seymour at the Emmy Awards, 1994

In the 1990s, Seymour earned popular and critical praise for her ongoing headlining role as Dr. Michaela "Mike" Quinn in the television series Dr. Quinn, Medicine Woman and its television sequels Dr. Quinn, Medicine Woman: The Movie (1999) and Dr. Quinn, Medicine Woman: The Heart Within (2001). Her work on the original series earned her a second Golden Globe Award. While working in the series, she met the man who would become her fourth husband, actor-director James Keach.

In the 2000s, she continued to work primarily in television. In 2004 and 2005, she made six guest appearances in The WB series Smallville, playing Genevieve Teague, the wealthy, scheming mother of Jason Teague (Jensen Ackles). In 2005, she returned to the big screen in the comedy Wedding Crashers, playing Kathleen Cleary, wife of fictional United States Secretary of the Treasury William Cleary, played by Christopher Walken. In spring 2006, she appeared in the short-lived The WB series Modern Men. Later that year, she guest-starred as a law school professor on an episode of the CBS sitcom How I Met Your Mother, and as a wealthy client on the Fox legal drama Justice. In 2007, she guest-starred in the ABC sitcom In Case of Emergency. She also appeared in ITV's Marple: Ordeal By Innocence, based on the Agatha Christie novel. Appearing as a contestant on season five of the American reality show Dancing with the Stars; where she finished in sixth place with her partner Tony Dovolani. Then she guest-starred in "One Life to Lose", a soap-opera-themed episode of the ABC crime dramedy Castle.

She later appeared in the Hallmark Channel film Dear Prudence (2008), the romantic comedy Love, Wedding, Marriage (2011), and the Hallmark Movie Channel film Lake Effects (2012).

In April 2016 she starred as Florence Lancaster in Noël Coward's play The Vortex, presented in Singapore by the British Theatre Playhouse. In 2022, she began playing the title role on the Irish Acorn TV series Harry Wild.

In 2020, she starred in Ruby's Choice, an Australian comedy/drama produced and directed by Michael Budd, which follows her title role, Ruby, as a woman with early dementia, and its impact on her and her family when she is no longer able to live independently and moves in with the family. The role won her the Australian screen industry Network Award for best actress. The film was released theatrically across Australia and New Zealand on 3 March 2022 and on 7 March 2022 premiered in Santa Barbara, California, at the 37th Santa Barbara International Film Festival where it was a Nominee Best International Feature Film. Seymour's 'Ruby's Choice' made the U.S. premiere at the Burbank International Film Festival (BIFF), winning Best Foreign Film and Best Feature Film. The event coincided with the honouring of the legendary filmmaker Tim Burton. 'Ruby's Choice' releasing nationwide in North America on May 7th, 2024."

Seymour then appeared in the movie, Irish Wish, released on 14 March 2024, on Netflix. Debuing at number one on Netflix's most watched films list, two days following its release.

In 2025, she began hosting an Acorn TV/BBC America series called Relative Secrets.

== Personal life ==
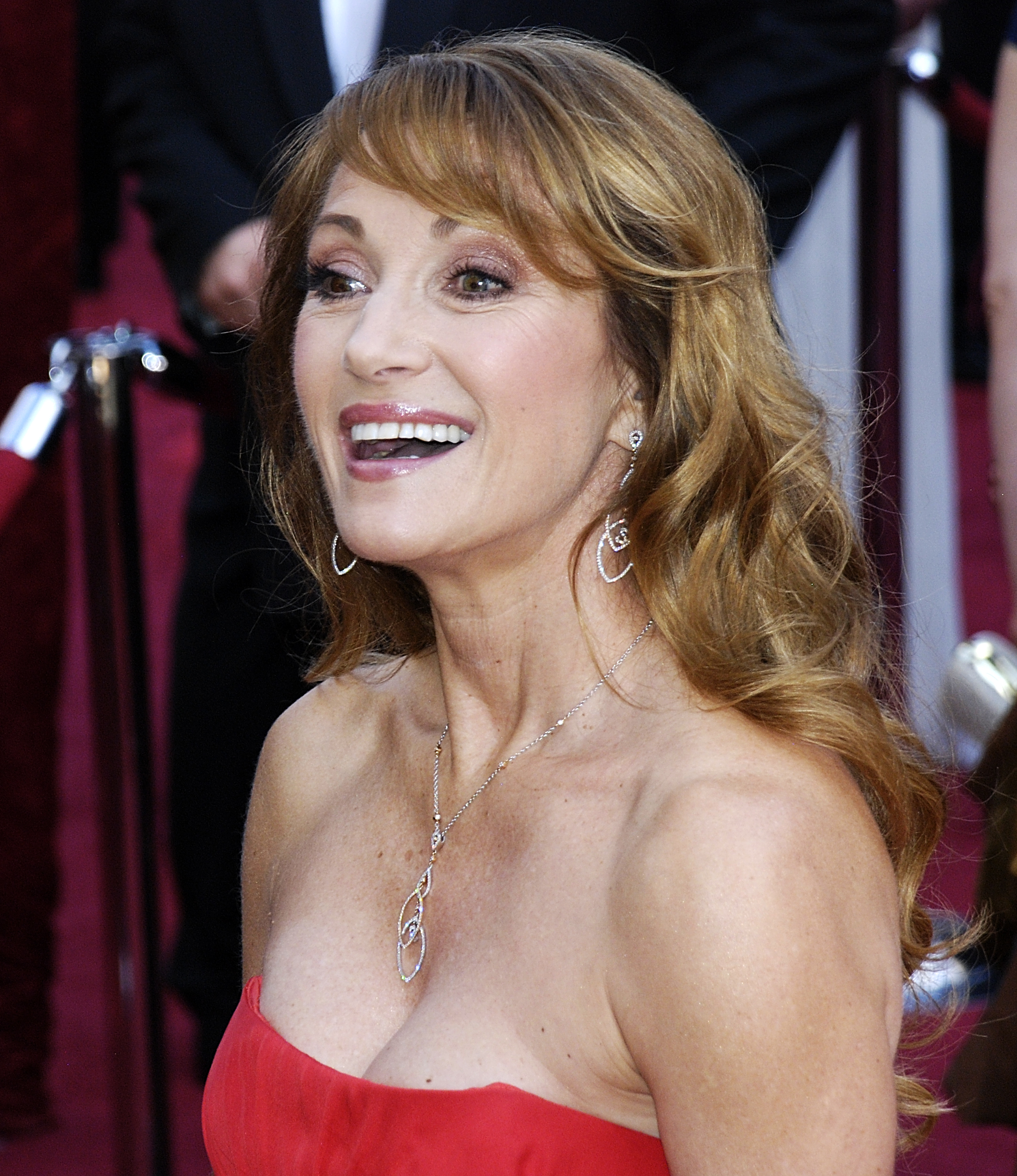
Jane Seymour at the 82nd Academy Awards in 2010

Seymour has been married and divorced four times. Her first marriage was to Michael Attenborough. She was then briefly married to Geoffrey Planer.

Seymour has said that she and Christopher Reeve fell in love while working on Somewhere in Time early in the summer of 1979. However, they broke up after Reeve found out his ex-girlfriend was expecting their child, who would be born in December 1979. The two remained close friends for the rest of Reeve's life, and he was the godfather of one of her sons.

In 1981, she married David Flynn. The marriage produced two children: Katherine Flynn (born on 7 February 1982) and Sean Flynn (born on 31 July 1985). Flynn involved her in the housing market, which left her "completely beyond bankrupt". The couple divorced in 1992. The following year, she married actor/producer/director James Keach. The couple had twins, John Stacy and Kristopher Steven, born on 30 November 1995. The twins were named after family friends Johnny Cash and Christopher Reeve, and James's brother, actor Stacy Keach.

In 1988, during the filming of Onassis: The Richest Man in the World, Seymour nearly died when, after developing pneumonia, an antibiotic injection was accidentally placed into her vein instead of muscle, causing her to go into anaphylactic shock. Seymour said that she had a near-death experience, where she left her body, experienced a bright white light, and from above could calmly see the medical personnel screaming and trying to resuscitate her. She said that afterwards, the lesson she took from the experience was that the only thing you leave behind is "the love you gave to others and the difference you made in others' lives", and she became even more involved in philanthropy.

In February 2005, Seymour became a naturalized citizen of the United States.

Seymour is a celebrity ambassador for Childhelp, a national nonprofit organisation dedicated to helping victims of child abuse and neglect. In 2007, she sponsored a children's Art Pillow contest as part of the Jane Seymour Collection, with the proceeds going to Childhelp.

On 12 April 2013, it was announced that she was divorcing Keach. The divorce was finalised in December 2015.

In February 2018, she posed for Playboy for a third time, becoming at the age of 67 the oldest woman to be photographed for the magazine. In the Playboy interview, she revealed that she had briefly quit acting after being sexually harassed by an unnamed film producer in the early 1970s. She had earlier referred to the incident in her 1986 book Jane Seymour's Guide to Romantic Living.

Her Malibu house almost burned down during the 2018 fires, but was saved, according to her, "by an incredibly devoted gardener and neighbour".

Since 2023 she has been in a relationship with musician John Zambetti. She confirmed their engagement on June 11, 2026.

== Writing and fashion career ==
In the 1980s, Seymour began a parallel career as a writer of self-help and inspirational books, including Jane Seymour's Guide to Romantic Living (1986), Two at a Time: Having Twins (2002), Remarkable Changes (2003) and Among Angels (2010). She also co-wrote several children's books, with her then-husband James Keach, for the This One 'N That One series.

In 1985, she appeared at Fashion Aid, a one-time fashion show fundraiser held at the Royal Albert Hall in London and organised by Bob Geldof to raise funds for the ongoing Ethiopian famine caused by the policies of dictator Mengistu Haile Mariam. The finale of the show had her partake in a mock wedding with Freddie Mercury. Jane was wearing a white lace wedding dress designed by David and Elizabeth Emanuel – who had previously created Princess Diana's wedding gown.

In 2008, she replaced Selina Scott as the new face of fashion label CC (formerly known as Country Casuals) under the Austin Reed banner of retailers.

Also in 2008, she teamed up with and designed the "Open Heart Collection" for Kay Jewelers, which promoted it with the advice, "Keep your heart open and love will always find its way in." Beginning that year, she saw to it that she would always be wearing one of the collection's necklaces whenever seen in public (while not in character for any of her acting performances). In the same year, she was also writing and publishing the books Open Hearts: If Your Heart Is Open, Love Will Always Find Its Way In and Open Hearts Family.

A 2.08-carat cushion-cut fancy vivid blue diamond in an 18-karat rose-gold-plated platinum setting was named "The Jane Seymour" in her honour by World of Diamonds Group, (which had mined it in Russia, then cut and set it). The ring was presented to Seymour in April 2016 in Singapore, while she was there to star in The Vortex.

However, the diamond was eventually found to be synthetic and was instrumental in a fraud case.

== Bibliography ==
- Jane Seymour's Guide to Romantic Living. Macmillan Publishers, 1986. ASIN: B003JFVAKC.
- Gus Loved His Happy Home. With Seymour Fleishman. Linnet Books, 1989. ISBN 978-0-208-02249-3
- Yum!: A Tale of Two Cookies. This One 'N That One series. With James Keach. Angel Gate, 1998. ISBN 978-1-932431-08-7
- Boing!: No Bouncing on the Bed. This One 'N That One series. With James Keach. Putnam Juvenile, 1999. ISBN 978-0-399-23440-8
- Splat!: The Tale of a Colorful Cat. This One 'N That One series. With James Keach. Turtleback Books, 2001. ISBN 978-1-4176-0825-6
- Two at a Time: Having Twins: The Journey Through Pregnancy and Birth. With Pamela Patrick Novotny. Atria Books, 2002. ISBN 978-0-671-03678-2
- Remarkable Changes: Turning Life's Challenges into Opportunities. New York: HarperEntertainment, 2003. ISBN 978-0-06-008747-0
- Making Yourself at Home: Finding Your Style and Putting It All Together. DK Adult, 2007. ISBN 978-0-7566-2892-5
- Open Hearts: If Your Heart Is Open, Love Will Always Find Its Way In. Running Press, 2008. ISBN 0-7624-3662-X
- Among Angels. Guideposts, 2010. ISBN 978-0-8249-4850-4

== Awards and nominations ==
Year	Award	Category	Nominated work	Results	Ref.
1995	Aftonbladet TV Prize	Best Foreign TV Personality – Female	—N/a	Won	
2021	Australian Screen Industry Network Awards	Best Actress	Ruby's Choice	Won	
2015	Bare Bones International Film Festival	Micro-Short Horror	Bereave	Nominated	
1973	Bravo Otto	Best Actress	—N/a	Nominated	
2014	Downtown Film Festival Los Angeles	Best Supporting Actress	Jake Squared	Won	
1996	Family Film Awards	Outstanding Actress in a Television Drama	Dr. Quinn, Medicine Woman	Won	
1995	Golden Boot Awards	Golden Boot	—N/a	Won	
1981	Golden Globe Awards	Best Actress in a Miniseries or Motion Picture Made for Television	East of Eden	Won	
1988	Golden Globe Awards	Best Actress in a Miniseries or Motion Picture Made for Television	The Woman He Loved	Nominated	
1988	Golden Globe Awards	Best Actress in a Miniseries or Motion Picture Made for Television	War and Remembrance	Nominated	
1989	Golden Globe Awards	Best Actress in a Miniseries or Motion Picture Made for Television	War and Remembrance	Nominated	
1993	Golden Globe Awards	Best Actress in a Television Series – Drama	Dr. Quinn, Medicine Woman	Nominated	
1994	Golden Globe Awards	Best Actress in a Television Series – Drama	Dr. Quinn, Medicine Woman	Nominated	
1995	Golden Globe Awards	Best Actress in a Television Series – Drama	Dr. Quinn, Medicine Woman	Won	
1996	Golden Globe Awards	Best Actress in a Television Series – Drama	Dr. Quinn, Medicine Woman	Nominated	
2016	Golden Raspberry Awards	Worst Supporting Actress	Fifty Shades of Black	Nominated	
2020	Online Film & Television Association Awards	Television Hall of Fame: Actors	—N/a	Inducted	
1993	People's Choice Awards	Favorite Female TV Performer	Dr. Quinn, Medicine Woman	Nominated	
1974	Photoplay Awards	New Female Star	—N/a	Nominated	
1977	Primetime Emmy Awards	Outstanding Lead Actress in a Limited Series	Captains and the Kings	Nominated	
1988	Primetime Emmy Awards	Outstanding Supporting Actress in a Miniseries or a Special	Onassis: The Richest Man in the World	Won	
1989	Primetime Emmy Awards	Outstanding Lead Actress in a Miniseries or a Special	War and Remembrance	Nominated	
1994	Primetime Emmy Awards	Outstanding Lead Actress in a Drama Series	Dr. Quinn, Medicine Woman	Nominated	
1998	Primetime Emmy Awards	Outstanding Lead Actress in a Drama Series	Dr. Quinn, Medicine Woman	Nominated	
1999	Primetime Emmy Awards	Outstanding Classical Music-Dance Program	A Streetcar Named Desire	Nominated	
2015	Sarasota Film Festival	Achievement in Acting	Bereave	Won	
1980	Saturn Awards	Best Actress	Somewhere in Time	Nominated	
1994	Screen Actors Guild Awards	Outstanding Performance by a Female Actor in a Drama Series	Dr. Quinn, Medicine Woman	Nominated	
1996	Screen Actors Guild Awards	Outstanding Performance by a Female Actor in a Drama Series	Dr. Quinn, Medicine Woman	Nominated	
2019	Screen Actors Guild Awards	Outstanding Performance by an Ensemble in a Comedy Series	The Kominsky Method	Nominated	
1978	TP de Oro	Best Foreign Actress	Seventh Avenue	2nd Place	
1993	Viewers for Quality Television Awards	Best Actress in a Quality Drama Series	Dr. Quinn, Medicine Woman	Nominated	
1994	Viewers for Quality Television Awards	Best Actress in a Quality Drama Series	Dr. Quinn, Medicine Woman	Nominated	
1997	Viewers for Quality Television Awards	Best Actress in a Quality Drama Series	Dr. Quinn, Medicine Woman	Nominated	
1998	Viewers for Quality Television Awards	Best Actress in a Quality Drama Series	Dr. Quinn, Medicine Woman	Nominated	
1997	Western Heritage Awards	Fictional Television Drama	Dr. Quinn, Medicine Woman	Won	

=== Honours ===
- 1999: Star on the Hollywood Walk of Fame.
- 2000: New Years Honours List. "For services to acting and entertainment".
- 2000: OBE Officer of the Order of the British Empire (Civil Division)
- 2010: Ellis Island Medal of Honor
- 2025: Honorary Doctorate of Fine Arts, High Point University

== See also ==
- List of British actors
- List of Primetime Emmy Award winners
- List of Golden Globe winners
