= The Cold Light of Day (2012 film) =

2012 film directed by Mabrouk El Mechri

- Theatrical release poster
- Directed by: Mabrouk El Mechri
- Written by: Scott Wiper; John Petro
- Produced by: Marc D. Evans; Trevor Macy; Jesus Martinez Asencio; Kevin Mann; Mark Canton
- Starring: Henry Cavill; Sigourney Weaver; Bruce Willis
- Cinematography: Remi Adefarasin
- Edited by: Valerio Bonelli
- Music by: Lucas Vidal
- Production companies: Intrepid Pictures; Galavis Film; Film Rites; Fria Luz Del Dia, A.I.E.
- Distributed by: Aurum Producciones (Spain); Summit Entertainment (United States; through Lionsgate)
- Release dates: April 4, 2012 (Spain); September 7, 2012 (United States)
- Running time: 93 minutes
- Countries: United States; Spain
- Language: English
- Budget: $20 million
- Box office: $25.4 million

The Cold Light of Day is a 2012 action thriller film directed by Mabrouk El Mechri and distributed by Summit Entertainment. It was written by Scott Wiper and John Petro and stars Henry Cavill, Bruce Willis, and Sigourney Weaver. The story follows Will (Cavill), who finds that his family has been kidnapped by foreign agents searching for a briefcase stolen by his father (Willis), which forces him to take matters into his own hands to find them.

Produced by Intrepid Pictures, the film was released in Spain on April 4, 2012 and in the United States on September 7, 2012. It received negative reviews and has a 4% approval rating on Rotten Tomatoes.

== Plot ==
Will Shaw, who owns a consultancy business in San Francisco that is about to go into insolvency, reluctantly visits his family in Spain for a holiday. He is met there by his father, Martin, an adviser for the U.S. government, with whom he has a tense relationship.

Will's preoccupation with his phone results in a sailing accident where Will leaps to save his brother's girlfriend Dara from being hit by the yacht's boom but she hits her head on a winch. Martin grabs the phone and throws it into the ocean. Will swims to town to fetch medical supplies and to cool down.

When Will returns, the yacht has moved and his family is gone. He goes to the police and they lead him to Zahir, who knows where his family is. He senses something is amiss, and attempts to escape in a police car. Martin appears, and helps Will by beating the officers.

Martin reveals he is a CIA agent, and that the people who kidnapped their family are after a briefcase he had taken on an assignment. Martin meets his CIA team leader Jean Carrack in Madrid, who claims she no longer has the briefcase, but he knows she is lying.

As Martin returns to his car, Gorman, a sniper, kills him. Will retrieves Martin's phone as Gorman starts shooting at him and gives chase. As Will escapes, he takes a call from the kidnappers, who want to speak to "Tom", providing a 21 hour deadline and a meeting point to exchange the briefcase for his family.

Receiving no help from the US embassy, Will is picked up by Carrack in a car outside, but he realizes she is untrustworthy. He feigns illness and she, disgusted by the thought of him vomiting in her car, has the car pulled over and Will gets away.

Will arranges a meeting with his father's friend Diego at his office and meets receptionist Lucia Caldera, Diego's niece, where he fights off one of Carrack's men. The pair go to Diego's apartment, but they find that he has been killed by Carrack and Gorman.

Will and Lucia escape across the rooftops, but he is shot. She takes him to a nightclub, to a friend who has medical experience who cauterizes the wound. Lucia explains that "Tom" is Martin's alias in Spain, and she is Will's half-sister, Martin's daughter by another woman.

As Will arrives at the meeting point, he is grabbed and tortured for his father's whereabouts by the kidnappers, actually Israeli Mossad agents led by Zahir, who was using the briefcase to lure a traitor when Martin stole it from them. They realize Carrack framed Martin and she has the briefcase, so they want Will to lure her out. He briefly sees his family before Zahir releases him.

Will meets Lucia at the nightclub, where she starts a tab on Carrack's credit card. Gorman appears and is subdued by bouncers at the club and tortured for information but he refuses to budge. Will lets Gorman escape so that he leads them to Carrack, who tries to sell the briefcase in an underground car park. Zahir's men surround them but give away their position when they try to contain Will, so Carrack and Gorman open fire on their own buyers before starting to attack and escape from Mossad. Will jumps into Gorman's car to get the briefcase and is able to grab it, when Lucia hits (the already shot) Gorman in a car crash and he dies. Will drops the case as he was flung from the car and an enraged Carrack is able to grab the dropped briefcase and drives away.

Will and Lucia pursue Carrack through Madrid, with Carrack indiscriminately causing death and destruction along the way, until eventually their cars collide and Lucia is seriously injured. Just as Carrack is about to shoot Will, she is killed by Zahir with a sniper rifle, who retrieves the briefcase and releases his family. Lucia recovers in the hospital and Will looks on at his new expanded family. He is offered a job in the CIA; whether or not he accepts is left unresolved.

== Cast ==
- Henry Cavill as Will Shaw
- Bruce Willis as Martin Shaw
- Sigourney Weaver as Jean Carrack
- Verónica Echegui as Lucia Caldera
- Caroline Goodall as Laurie Shaw
- Rafi Gavron as Josh Shaw
- Joseph Mawle as Gorman
- Óscar Jaenada as Maximo
- Lolo Herrero as Reynaldo
- Mark Ullod as Vicente
- Emma Hamilton as Dara Collins
- Michael Budd as Esmael
- Alex Amaral as Cesar
- Jim Piddock as Meckler
- Paloma Bloyd as Cristiana
- Roschdy Zem as Zahir
- Colm Meaney as CIA Agent

== Production ==
The film was shot in Spain, including at Teulada-Moraira and Xàbia on the Costa Blanca. It was released on April 6, 2012 in the United Kingdom and September 7, 2012 in the United States.

== Reception ==
=== Box office ===
The Cold Light of Day grossed $1.8 million in its opening weekend and $25.4 million worldwide, against a budget of $20 million. It also made $5.5 million in domestic sales on home video.

=== Critical response ===
On the review aggregator website Rotten Tomatoes, 4% of 48 critics' reviews are positive, with an average rating of 2.9/10. Metacritic, which uses a weighted average, assigned the film a score of 22 out of 100, based on 10 critics, indicating "generally unfavorable" reviews.

Audiences polled by CinemaScore gave the film an average grade of "D+" on an A+ to F scale. The New York Times described the film as a "thoroughly incompetent 'Bourne' movie imitation".
