= Untitled Mike Thornton biopic film =

- Directed by: Patrick Hughes
- Written by: Mark Semos; Alan Ritchson; Jason Hall
- Produced by: Sylvester Stallone; Todd Lieberman; Alex Young; Alan Ritchson; Alan Rautbort
- Starring: Alan Ritchson; Joe Cole; Kyle Allen; Kodi Smit-McPhee
- Production companies: Balboa Productions; Hidden Pictures; AllyCat Entertainment
- Distributed by: Amazon MGM Studios
- Country: United States
- Language: English

Patrick Hughes is directing an upcoming American biographical drama film about the life of retired Navy SEAL Michael E. Thornton. It stars Alan Ritchson, Joe Cole, Kyle Allen, and Kodi Smit-McPhee.

== Cast ==
- Alan Ritchson as Michael E. Thornton
- Joe Cole as Thomas R. Norris
- Hoa Xuande
- Kyle Allen
- Kodi Smit-McPhee
- Brian Duong
- Duy Nguyễn
- Aden Young
- Sam Rechner

== Production ==
In September 2025, it was announced that Patrick Hughes would direct a biographical drama film about the life of retired Navy SEAL Michael E. Thornton, with the screenplay written by Mark Semos, Alan Ritchson, and Jason Hall, with Ritchson cast in the lead role. In December 2025, Joe Cole and Hoa Xuande joined the cast. In January 2026, Kyle Allen, Brian Duong, Duy Nguyễn, Kodi Smit-McPhee, Aden Young, and Sam Rechner rounded out the cast.

Principal photography began on January 16, 2026, in Queensland.
