= The Crop (film) =

- Film poster
- Directed by: Scott Patterson
- Written by: George Elliot
- Produced by: David Wood
- Starring: George Elliot; Holly Brisley; Rhys Muldoon
- Cinematography: Roger Lanser
- Edited by: Michael Horwitz; Tim Wellburn
- Music by: Subvision
- Production company: Miracle Productions
- Distributed by: Elliot Bros Film Distribution; Roadshow Entertainment
- Release date: 18 August 2004
- Running time: 103 minutes
- Country: Australia
- Language: English
- Budget: $4,000,000 (AUD)
- Box office: A$208,739 (Australia)

The Crop is a 2004 Australian comedy film set during the 1980s.

== Plot ==
The Crop, is set in the early 1980s in Australia, and is about larrikin nightclub owner, Ronnie 'Blade' Gillette (George Elliot), and his barmaid girlfriend Geraldine (Holly Brisley). Two months after random breath testing has been introduced, Blade realises he's going broke. Afraid of driving under the influence, his customers are not buying his grog, they're going out to the carpark to smoke dope.

Like any good businessman, Blade decides he needs a strategy. He decides to grow some dope as a way out of his financial hole. Blade and his best mate, Wack (Rhys Muldoon), set about growing their crop of weed on a property owned by the father of his girlfriend but they soon get caught in a bind between crooked cops and a ruthless moneylender.

== Cast ==
Actor	Character
George Elliot	Ronnie 'Blade' Gillette
Holly Brisley	Geraldine
Rhys Muldoon	David 'Wack' Kowakski
Rudi Baker	Billy Bong
Tony Barry	Senior
Kelly Butler	Jacki
Sam O'Dell	Danny
Rob Steele	Malone
Vincent Stone	Dago
Tahnee Stroet	Tania
Bruce Venables	Wally Eye
Kristy Wright	Nancy
Ross Newton	Cop

== Box office ==
The Crop received numerous poor reviews. and only grossed $208,739 (AUD) at the box office in Australia.

== Reception ==
The Crop received the prize for 'Best International Feature Film' at the New York International Film Festival in 2005.
