= Christopher Kirby =

Australian actor

Christopher Kirby is an Australian actor. He is known for his performance in the 2012 film Iron Sky. Other films he has appeared in include The Matrix Reloaded (2003) and Star Wars: Episode III – Revenge of the Sith (2005).

== Filmography ==
=== Film ===
Year	Title	Role	Notes
1997	Eat Your Heart Out	Bobo	
2002	Queen of the Damned	New York Vampire	
2002	Crackerjack	Supervisor	
2003	The Matrix Reloaded	Mauser	
2003	Visitors	Rob	
2003	The Matrix Revolutions	Mauser	
2004	Strange Bedfellows	Tim	
2005	Star Wars: Episode III – Revenge of the Sith	Giddean Danu	
2006	Macbeth	Seyton	
2009	Daybreakers	Jarvis Bayom	
2009	Mao's Last Dancer	Mason	
2010	I Love You Too	Francesca's Security	
2011	Frank & Jerry	Bobby	
2012	Iron Sky	James Washington	
2012	3010 Children of the Revenant	Thomas	Short film
2014	Predestination	Mr. Miles	
2014	The Apprentice	Cop 1	Short film
2015	Arrowhead	Norman Oleander	
2017	Solus	The Ranger	Short film
2017	That's Not Me	Cameron Pollock	
2017	Speaking Daggers	Benedick	Short film
2017	Liz Drives	Marcus	Short film
2017	Life of the Party	Perry	
2018	Upgrade	Tolan	
2019	Back of the Net	David	
2019	Dora and the Lost City of Gold	Viper	
2019	Blood Vessel	Lydell Jackson	
2019	2099: The Soldier Protocol	The Scientist	
2022	Parole	Parole officer	Short film
2023	Late Night with the Devil	Phil	
2023	Nightmare Radio: The Night Stalker	Marcus	

=== Television ===
Year	Title	Role	Notes
1990	Quantum Leap	Herbert "Magic" Williams	1 episode
1990	Gabriel's Fire	Basketball Opponent	1 episode
1992	The Late Show	Rip-off Graham/Rodney King	2 episodes
1994	Neighbours	Drew Grover	1 episode
1994	The Damnation of Harvey McHugh	Brock	Miniseries (3 episodes)
1995	Ocean Girl	Second Officer	13 episodes
1995	Flipper	Captain Dyer	4 episodes
1995-1996	Space: Above and Beyond	Various	3 episodes
1996	The Fresh Prince of Bel-Air	Mr. Clark	1 episode
1996	The Burning Zone	Dark Figure	1 episode
1997	Heartbreak High	Quiz Master	1 episode
1999	Linc's	Player #1	1 episode
2000	Chameleon 3: Dark Angel	Freeman	TV movie
2000	The Games	Unknown	1 episode
2000	The Lost World	Prince Apep	1 episode
2001	Crash Zone	Glen Wilson	1 episode
2000-2001	Beastmaster	Orpheo	2 episodes
2001-2002	Ponderosa	Samuel Newborn	2 episodes
2002	A Ring of Endless Light	Harbor Master Dan	TV movie
2002	Marshall Law	Tripod	1 episode
2003	Evil Never Dies	Cole Meyer	TV movie
2004	Salem's Lot	Nurse (uncredited)	Miniseries
2005	All Saints	Gordon Breen	1 episode
2006	Nightmares & Dreamscapes: From the Stories of Stephen King	Sarge	1 episode
2007	The Starter Wife	Detective Smith	Miniseries (2 episodes)
2001-2008	The Saddle Club	Colonel Hanson	9 episodes
2013	Camp	Raffi	TV series
2015	Sweatshop	Terrance Goodpenny	TV movie
2015	The Divorce	Dre	Miniseries
2016	Hunters	News Anchor	1 episode
2017	Shakespeare Republic	Thomas More	2 episodes
2017	Wolf Creek	Bruce Walker	3 episodes
2018	Wrong Kind of Black	Perth Bartender	Miniseries
2018	Pine Gap	Denver Controller (voice)	2 episodes
2019	Secret City	Kip Buchanan	5 episodes
2019	My Life Is Murder	Levi Cavanaugh	1 episode
2019	Preacher	Chief Wittman	3 episodes
2020	How to Stay Married	Lance Garrison	1 episode
2020	Shakespeare Republic: #AllTheWebsAStage (The Lockdown Chronicles)	Richard/Newsreader	2 episodes
2021	Ms Fisher's Modern Murder Mysteries	Abraham Sifo	1 episode
2021	Wentworth	Ron Bryant	1 episode
2022	WTFitness	Julian	1 episode
