= Life of the Party (2017 film) =

2018 Australian comedy/suspense film

- Directed by: Michael Budd
- Written by: Liam Barrett; Michael Budd
- Produced by: Michael Budd; Jessica Butland; Raymond J. Daniel
- Starring: Christopher Kirby; Michael Budd; Holly Brisley; Georgia Chara; Damian Sommerlad; Talin Agon; Greg Eccleston; Michael Budd
- Cinematography: Casimir Dickson
- Edited by: Ann Foo
- Music by: Jamie Fonti
- Distributed by: Indie Rights
- Release date: 17 July 2017
- Running time: 84 minutes
- Country: Australia
- Language: English

Life of the Party is a 2017 Australian independent Comedy/Suspense film directed and produced by Michael Budd it represents Budd's second feature film. The film stars Budd, Holly Brisley, Christopher Kirby and Georgia Chara and Damian Sommerlad. It premiered on 17 July 2017 in Australia and on 14 September 2018 at the Arena Cinelounge Sunset Los Angeles in the U.S. state of California. The film was shot completely in Sydney, Mosman.

== Plot ==
A heartwarming story of three friends who try to break the world record for the worlds longest house party.

== Cast ==
- Holly Brisley as Sandra
- Michael Budd as Kray
- Damian Sommerlad as Jason
- Christopher Kirby as Perry
- Georgia Chara as Bea
- Talin Agon as Becky
- Greg Eccleston as Myron
- Isaro Kayitesi as Gracie
- Hayley Gia Hughes as Jessie
- Johnny Lahoud as Geno
- Michela Carattini as Sarah
- Rachael Steel as Layla / Dj-Singer
- Ben Hamilton as Noodle Guy / Party Guest
- Lucy Kate Westbrook as Homebuyer
- Toks James as Winston
- Alexandra Erickson as Drunk Girl
- Quentin Yung as Paul
- David Nash as Big John Arm Wrestler
- Shane Millward as Olaf Goldstien
- Wayne Harricks as Clinton
- Corinne Deanna Campbell as Random Party Girl
- Tor Dollhouse as Party Guest
- Lynne Baillie as Party Guest
- Leanne Watson Chamouille as TV Producer
- Lexi Gallo as Linda
- Anthony Vercoe as Carl
- Aria McCarthy-Lochner as Party Guest
- Brad Free as Party Guest
- Harris Budd as Child
- Ada Reinthal as Broken Nose Girl
- Theresa McCarthy as Party Guest
- Lisa Gilbertson as College Parent (uncredited)
