= HLA DQB1*06:02 =

HLA DQB1*06:02 is an allele of the human leukocyte antigen class II gene that is strongly associated with an increased risk of developing type 1 narcolepsy (previously narcolepsy with cataplexy) and a reduced risk of type 1 diabetes. It is present in >90% of individuals with type 1 narcolepsy and <1% of cases of type 1 diabetes. The allele is not required for the development of type 1 narcolepsy, although DQB1*06:02-negative cases are rare. Its presence does not preclude the development of type 1 diabetes. DQB1*60:02 is present in 12-38% of the general population.
