= Michael Budd =

Australian film actor, director and producer

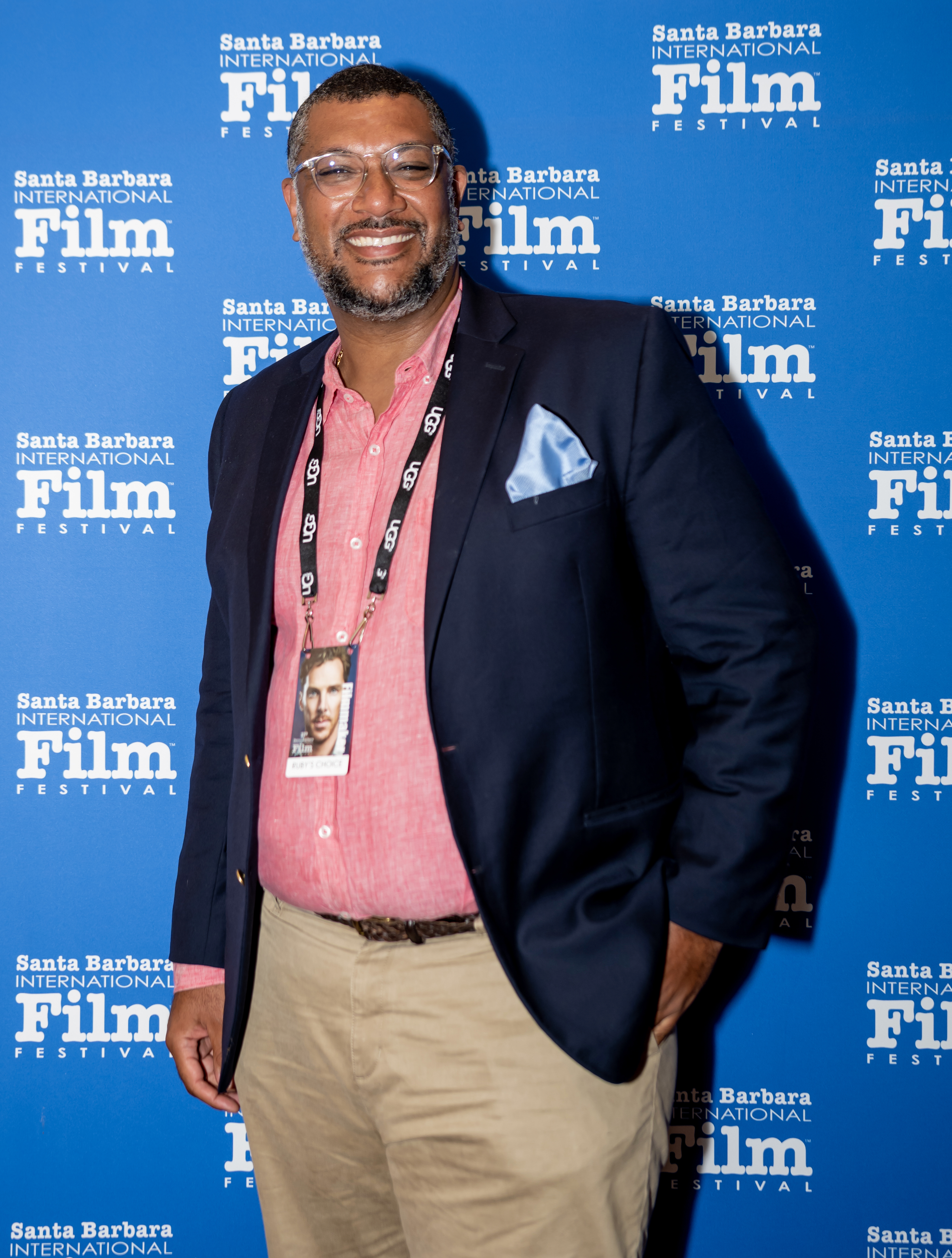
- Budd in 2022 at Santa Barbara Film Festival
- Born: 2 July 1974 (age 52); Paddington, Sydney, Australia
- Occupations: Film director, writer, actor, rapper
- Years active: 1995–present
- Children: 2

Michael Hamish Budd (born 2 July 1974) is an Australian film actor, director and producer. Budd is best known for playing Esmael in The Cold Light of Day.

== Career ==
Budd's initial break in Hollywood came in 2001 when the Wachowskis selected him as a body double and stand in for Laurence Fishburne in The Matrix Reloaded and The Matrix Revolutions. After 200 shoot days, the directors cast him in his own role as Zion Controller. In 2008, Budd starred in a music video for roll deep called Moving in Circles which featured Goldie.

Budd studied acting and staging in London. He graduated from the Meisner technique with the Impulse Company in 2010 he then went on to play on stage in works of Chekhov and Shakespeare and Mamet plays, in particular playing Othello in a shortened version of Othello in the Tristan Bate Theatre in London's West End.

In 2011 Mabrouk El Mechri cast Budd as Esmael in The Cold Light of Day, set and shot completely in Spain. He played a Mossad agent, with dialogue in both Hebrew and English. In 2012/13, Budd directed and produced Love of My Life, a horror thriller in which he also starred alongside Peter O'Brien and Diarmid Heidenreich. The film premiered in the United States at the Mt. Hood Independent Film Festival in Oregon and won the Best Horror/Thriller award. Following its success, "Love of My Life" was released on Video on Demand with Gravitas Ventures.

Budd's second feature film, Life of the Party completed filming in December 2016. The screenplay, co-written by Budd, was included in the Library of the Academy of Motion Picture Arts & Sciences' permanent Core Collection. It premiered on 14 September 2018 at the Arena Cinelounge Sunset Los Angeles.

2019 Michael produced and directed Rubys Choice the production faced challenges due to the COVID-19 pandemic, but it was eventually completed under strict guidelines in Windsor. Ruby's Choice premiered at Margaret River HEART for CinefestOZ in August 2021, then on 7 March 2022, at the 37th Santa Barbara International Film Festival. On October 19 and 20 2022, New Port Beach film festival it was sold out with positive reviews. On 24 September 2023, at the Burbank International Film Festival (BIFF) it won Best Foreign Film and Best Feature Film.

In 2023 he was painted by AFI costume design winner for Baz Luhrmann's film Australia, Eliza Godman for entry to the Archibald Prize in a portrait named “Remembering” in which Budd is in a director's chair with his grandmother looking over his shoulder.

=== Director credits ===
Features
Year	Title	Director	Writer	Producer
2013	Love of My Life	Yes	Yes	Yes
2018	Life of the Party	Yes	Yes	Yes
2022	Ruby's Choice	Yes	No	Yes

Television
Year	Title	Director	Writer	Executive Producer	Notes
2023	Black Wattle	Yes	No	Yes	Showrunner"
