= Monster Pies =

- Directed by: Lee Galea
- Screenplay by: Lee Galea
- Produced by: Lee Galea
- Starring: Tristan Barr; Lucas Linehan
- Cinematography: Daniel von Czarnecki
- Edited by: Lee Galea
- Music by: Michael Allen
- Production companies: Babaloo Studios; Lime Street Entertainment; Indie Melbourne Productions
- Distributed by: TLA Releasing
- Release date: March 2013 (Melbourne)
- Running time: 85 minutes
- Country: Australia
- Language: English

Monster Pies is an Australian drama film, directed by Lee Galea and released in 2013. The film centres on Mike (Tristan Barr) and Will (Lucas Linehan), two high school students who fall in love with each other when they are assigned to work together on a class project to reimagine a scene from Romeo and Juliet as a horror film.

The cast also includes Rohana Hayes, Katrina Maree, Nicola Eveleigh, Marcel Reluctant, Marlene Magee, Shea MacDonough, Petra Salsjo, Jeremy Kewley, Nick Wyatt, James Liotta, Dan Farmer, Ashley Taylor, Sean McIntyre and Jasmine Purches in supporting roles.

The film was made on a budget of just $30,000, of which Linehan fronted part of the budget himself.

It premiered at the 2013 Melbourne Queer Film Festival, where it won the Audience Award for best feature film.
