= Among Angels (book) =

First edition (publ. Guideposts Books)

Among Angels is a book written by the actress Jane Seymour released in 2010. It is presented as an inspirational work that focuses on the presence of angels among people.
