= Holly Brisley =

Australian actress and television presenter (born 1978)

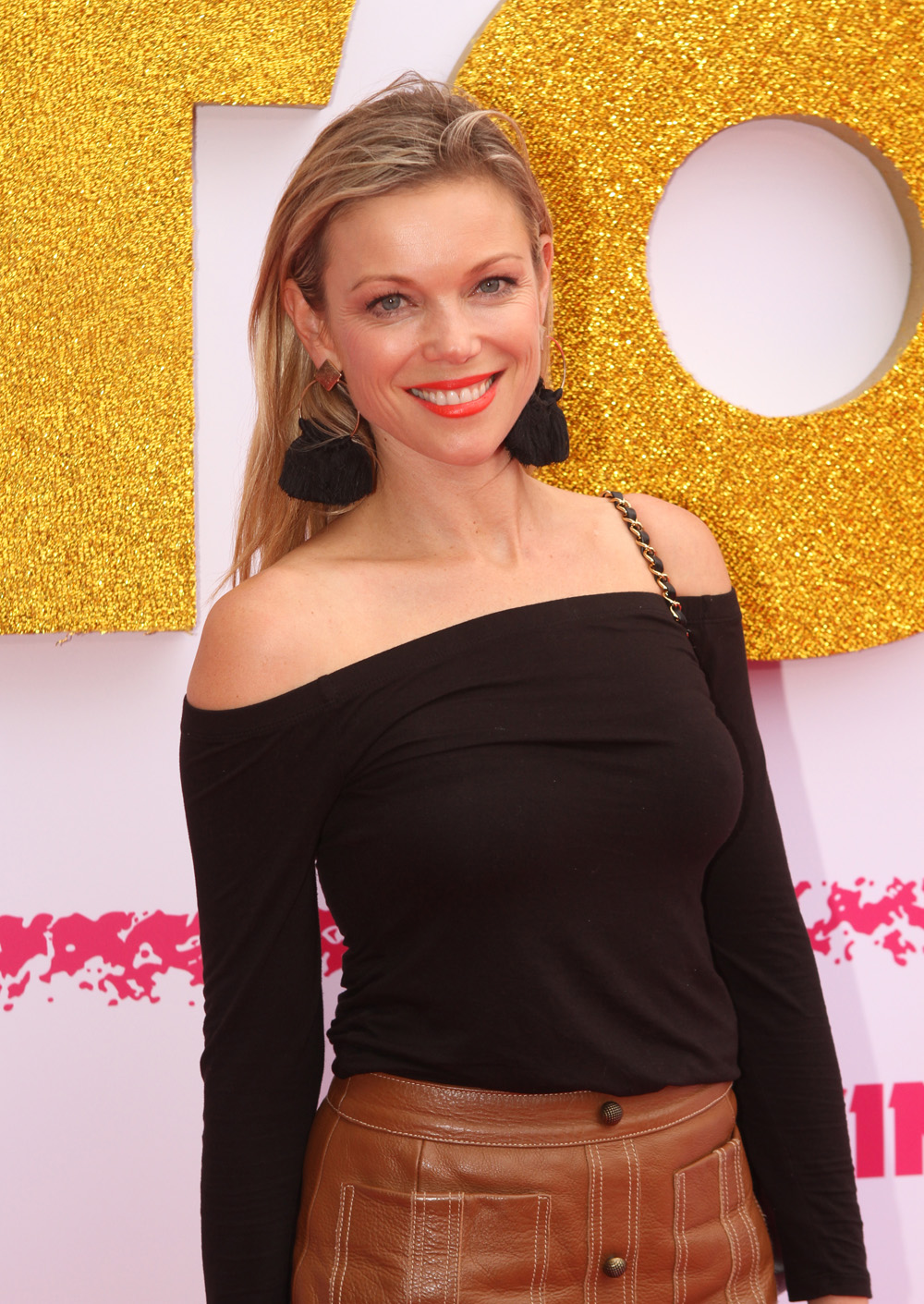
- Brisley at the I, Tonya film premiere in Sydney, Australia on 23 January 2018
- Born: 11 January 1978 (age 48); Adelaide, South Australia, Australia
- Occupations: Actress, television presenter
- Years active: 1991–present
- Spouse: Paul Ford (m. 2006)
- Children: 2

Holly Brisley (born 11 January 1978) is an Australian actress and television presenter. She began her career at the age of 16 on Agro's Cartoon Connection (1994–97) and more recently portrayed Amanda Vale-Baker on Home and Away (2005–09). Her most successful film roles include Garage Days (2001) and The Crop (2004).

== Early life ==
Brisley was born in Adelaide, South Australia. Her family moved from Adelaide to the Gold Coast while she was still very young. As Brisley grew up, she excelled at speech and drama and joined the Paradise Performer's Dance Academy, where she participated in classes such as jazz, ballet and tap, and took part in eisteddfods, winning many awards.

== Career ==
By the age of 13, Brisley was on the books of the Studio Search Agency on the Gold Coast, with her first roles being the Australian telemovies The Flood: Who Will Save Our Children? in 1993 and Official Denial in 1994.

It was not until Brisley began her regular television career in 1994 on the Logie Award–winning children's program Agro's Cartoon Connection, that she began to receive recognition. She would later host The Looney Tunes Show in a more adult style, along with World's Craziest Videos and various shows for Foxtel. Holly was ranked 5th (2000) and 29th (2001) in FHM's Australia's 100 Sexiest Women.

Brisley maintained her acting career throughout this period with some of her notable roles being in Garage Days, The Crop and Dynasty: The Making of a Guilty Pleasure.

After various guest appearances and hosting gigs, Brisley was featured in Dancing with the Stars in 2005, and then landed the permanent role of town vixen Amanda Vale on soap opera Home and Away, where she remained for two years. In February 2008, she briefly returned to Home and Away, reprising her role again in July 2009 and leaving in mid-August 2009. Brisley has since said she would love to return to the series.

Over the years, she has worked (at one stage or another) for most networks, including Network 10 and Foxtel, but mostly she has worked for the Seven Network and the Nine Network.

In 2008, Brisley voiced the title character in the ABC children's series CJ the DJ which screened in Australia from late 2009 to early 2010. Brisley played the female lead Tara in the 2011 feature film Sinbad and the Minotaur.

In November 2019, she appeared on 7mate in the reincarnation of Fat Pizza, as Pauly's former high school crush, who works in the local pharmacy.

== Personal life ==
Brisley became engaged to marketing executive Paul Ford in Venice in 2005 and they married on 11 February 2006 in Manly, Sydney. They exchanged vows in the Cardinal Cerretti Memorial Chapel, in the grounds of St Patrick's Seminary overlooking the ocean.

She gave birth to their son at the Royal on 16 July 2009. On 20 July 2012, she gave birth to her second child, a daughter.

Brisley has coeliac disease, and appeared on the cover of "The Australian Coeliac" September 2005 edition.

In July 2010, Brisley climbed Mount Kilimanjaro in Africa for a charity trek, raising $50,000 for the Humpty Dumpty Foundation, a worthy cause that helps sick children. She had a near-death experience, having contracted pulmonary edema caused by the high altitude, but is in good health now.

== Awards and nominations ==
On 1 June 2005, she received a Film Award for 'Best Actress – Feature Film' at the New York Film & Video Festival for her portrayal of "Geraldine" in the Australian film The Crop. The film also won 'Best International Feature'.

== Filmography ==
=== Film ===
| Year | Title | Role | Notes |
|---|---|---|---|
| 1999 | Change of Heart | Half a Heart Model | |
| 2000 | Enemies Closer | TV Character Secret Agent | |
| 2002 | Scooby-Doo | Training Video Woman | |
| 2002 | Garage Days | Scarlet | |
| 2003 | The Matrix: Reloaded | Woman in Restaurant | |
| 2004 | The Crop | Geraldine | |
| 2006 | Me or You | Psychiatrist | Short |
| 2007 | Devil's Gateway | Samantha Davies | |
| 2008 | The Fury | Scarlet | |
| 2014 | Tibor – Your Not from Gosford Are Ya | Jenny | Short |
| 2014 | Confessions | Kara (voice) | |
| 2017 | Life of the Party | Sandra | |
| 2023 | Kane | Sofia | |
| TBA | Enter Sanctum | Cynthia | Post-production |

=== Television ===
| Year | Title | Role | Notes |
|---|---|---|---|
| 1993 | The Flood: Who Will Save Our Children? | Tonya Smith | TV movie |
| 1993 | Official Denial | Dos | TV movie |
| 1995–1997 | Agro's Cartoon Connection | Reporter | Seasons 7–9 |
| 1996–1999 | TVSN | Presenter | Shopping channel |
| 1999 | Beastmaster | Haisa | Season 1, episode 3 |
| 2000 | Nowhere to Land | Jenny | TV movie |
| 2000 | All Saints | Janelle | Season 3, episode 10 |
| 2000 | Olympic Games Opening Ceremony | Reporter | TV special |
| 2000 | MusicCountry Prime | Herself | (unknown episodes) |
| 2000 | Under the Hammer | Herself | (unknown episodes) |
| 2000 | Introducing Hang Zhou | Presenter | BBC World |
| 2001 | Beastmaster | Haisa, Kodo-Woman | Season 3, episode 5 |
| 2001 | The Panel | Herself | Season 4, episode 30 |
| 2001 | It's Your Go | Host | (unknown episodes) |
| 2002 | The Looney Tunes Show | Host | Showcase clips |
| 2003 | Big Brother | Panelist | Season 3, 2 episodes |
| 2003 | White Collar Blue | Amber Flood | Season 2, episode 5 |
| 2003 | Pizza | Louise | Season 3, episodes 2 & 4 |
| 2003 | Mermaids | Young Betty | TV movie |
| 2004 | Escape with ET | Reporter | |
| 2005 | Dynasty: The Making of a Guilty Pleasure | Heather Locklear | TV movie |
| 2005 | Dancing with the Stars | Contestant | Season 2 |
| 2005–2007; 2008–2009 | Home and Away | Amanda Vale | Season 18–20 (main role), Season 21 (guest role), Season 22 (recurring role) |
| 2005–2006 | World's Craziest Videos | Host | (unknown episodes) |
| 2006 | Get Nicked | Host | (unknown episodes) |
| 2006 | Good as Gold! | Host | (unknown episodes) |
| 2007 | The Wright Stuff | Guest Panelist | |
| 2009 | The Spearman Experiment | Contributor | (unknown episodes) |
| 2009–10 | CJ the DJ | Cathleen 'CJ' Jones | |
| 2011 | Sinbad and the Minotaur | Tara | TV movie |
| 2019–2021 | Fat Pizza: Back in Business | Louise | Season 6–7, 4 episodes |

| Preceded by Justin Melvey & Kym Johnson | Dancing with the Stars (Australia) third place contestant Season 2 (Early 2005 with Mark Hodge) | Succeeded by Ian "Dicko" Dickson & Leanne Bampton |
