= Seiji Isotani =

Japanese-Brazilian computer scientist, researcher (born 1979)

- 磯谷 セイジ
- Born: September 1, 1979 (age 47); São Paulo city, São Paulo, Brazil
- Occupations: Professor, researcher, scientist and author

Academic background
- Education: B.S., Computer Science; M.S., Computer Science; Ph.D., Information Engineering
- Alma mater: University of São Paulo; Osaka University
- Doctoral advisor: Prof. Riichiro Mizoguchi.

Academic work
- Institutions: Harvard University; Carnegie Mellon University; Osaka University; University of São Paulo
- Main interests: Artificial Intelligence in Education, Gamification in Education, Educational Technologies, Educational Public Policies, and Connected Open Data
- Website: https://sites.icmc.usp.br/sisotani/

Seiji Isotani (磯谷 セイジ) (born 1979 in São Paulo city, São Paulo) is a Brazilian scientist specializing in the areas of artificial intelligence applied to education, particularly intelligent tutoring systems, gamification, and educational technologies. He is a visiting full professor in education at Harvard University and a full professor in computer science and educational technologies at the University of São Paulo. (Portuguese: Universidade de São Paulo, USP) since 2019,

Isotani's research focuses on advancing the science of how people learn with interactive and intelligent educational technologies. He is recognized for his research aimed at democratizing access to the benefits of technology to serve underprivileged populations. With over two hundred published scientific articles, he is listed among the most influential Latin American researchers in his fields of expertise. Since 2017, he has been working as a technical-scientific advisor in the design and implementation of various projects and public policies related to evidence-based educational technologies with the Ministry of Education of Brazil. In 2022, he was elected a member of the executive committee of the International Society of Artificial Intelligence in Education, becoming the first Latin American to hold such a position, and in 2025 he became President Elect of the society. In 2023, he became an Affiliate Faculty at the Berkman Klein Center for Internet and Society at Harvard University.

== Education ==
Isotani holds a bachelor's degree in Computer Science from the Institute of Mathematics and Statistics at the University of São Paulo. In 2005, he defended his master's dissertation in the field of interactive and intelligent technologies supporting the teaching of mathematics. The dissertation, titled "Development of tools in iGeom: using dynamic geometry in face-to-face and distance education," introduced a significant innovation with the creation of an algorithm for automatic exercise correction. This work was recognized as the best in the country in the field of computer science in education and received an award during the Brazilian Symposium on Computer Science in Education in 2006.

Isotani continued his research in Artificial Intelligence in Education (AIED) at Osaka University, Japan. His doctoral research, funded by IBM Research and the Japan Foundation, focused on modeling the knowledge necessary to understand the dynamics of collaborative learning. The goal was to create intelligent systems to support the design, implementation, and evaluation of collaborative activities for educational purposes. This achievement was awarded in the ACM Student Research Competition in 2007. In 2007, Isotani received the Upsilon Pi Epsilon Academic Achievement Award from the IEEE Computer Society (Upsilon Pi Epsilon / IEEE Computer Society Award for Academic Achievement). In 2009, he earned a Ph.D. in Information Engineering with the thesis "An Ontological Engineering Approach to Computer-Supported Collaborative Learning". In 2014, he obtained the title of livre-docente with the thesis "Contributions to Computer Science Applied to Education".

== Career ==
After completing his Ph.D., Isotani was hired as a postdoctoral researcher at the Human-Computer Interaction Institute at Carnegie Mellon University to work with Prof. Bruce M. McLaren on the project "Exploring the Learning Benefits of Erroneous Examples and Their Dynamic Adaptations Within the Context of Middle School Mathematics".

During this period, he was an active member of the Pittsburgh Science of Learning Center.

In 2011, Isotani returned to Brazil as an assistant professor affiliated with the Department of Computer Systems at the Institute of Mathematical and Computer Sciences at University of São Paulo in São Carlos. During this time, he played a role in founding two research laboratories: the Laboratory of Computing Applied to Education and Advanced Social Technology at University of São Paulo, and the Center of Excellence in Social Technologies (NEES) at the Federal University of Alagoas.

In his role as a visiting professor at Harvard University, Seiji Isotani focuses on the integration of AI within educational technologies. His notable project, AIED Unplugged, aims to bridge the digital divide by making AI tools accessible in resource-limited settings, positively impacting over 266,000 students across Brazil, Mexico, and the Philippines. Additionally, his research includes the use of gamification to enhance student engagement and learning outcomes.
