= El Amor de Mi Vida =

El Amor de Mi Vida may refer to:

- "El Amor de Mi Vida" (song), a 1992 song by Ricky Martin
- El Amor de Mi Vida (album), a 2006 album by Ronnie Drew and Eleanor Shanley
- El amor de mi vida, a 1998 Mexican telenovela broadcast by TV Azteca
- "El Amor de Mi Vida", 1978 song by Camilo Sesto

== See also ==
- "ADMV" (song) ("Amor de mi Vida"), song by Maluma
