= List of 2013 box office number-one films in Australia =

This is a list of films which placed number one at the box office in Australia during 2013. All amounts are in Australian dollars.

== Number-one films ==
†	This implies the highest-grossing movie of the year.

#	Week ending	Film	Total week gross	Openings
1	2 January 2013	The Hobbit: An Unexpected Journey	$16,862,668	Les Misérables (#2), Wreck-It Ralph (#3), Parental Guidance (#4), Quartet (#7), Samsara (#11), Sightseers (#18)
2	9 January 2013	The Hobbit: An Unexpected Journey	$8,675,651	Life of Pi (#2), Jack Reacher (#5)
3	16 January 2013	Life of Pi	$5,979,721	Gangster Squad (#5), Hitchcock (#8), ParaNorman (#9), Met Opera: Un ballo in maschera (#16), Saadi Love Story (#17), Matru Ki Bijlee Ka Mandola (#18)
4	23 January 2013	Life of Pi	$4,393,857	This Is 40 (#4), Monsters, Inc. 3D (#15)
5	30 January 2013	Django Unchained	$6,223,587	The Impossible (#3), The Guilt Trip (#10), Race 2 (#18), Met Opera: Aida (#20)
6	6 February 2013	Django Unchained	$3,303,563	Silver Linings Playbook (#2), Flight (#3), Zero Dark Thirty (#5), National Theatre Live: The Magistrate (#19)
7	13 February 2013	Hansel & Gretel: Witch Hunters	$2,925,809	Lincoln (#3), Movie 43 (#7), Special 26 (#19)
8	20 February 2013	Safe Haven	$2,507,801	Anna Karenina (#6), The Sweeney (#14), Love Story of Singh vs Kaur (#17)
9	27 February 2013	Silver Linings Playbook	$1,542,008	Beautiful Creatures (#2), The Last Stand (#7), Cirque du Soleil: Worlds Away (#9), Amour (#15), Met Opera: Maria Stuarda (#19), Kai Po Che! (#20)
10	6 March 2013	I Give It a Year	$1,867,666	Side Effects (#3), Cloud Atlas (#10), Save Your Legs! (#18), Journey to the West 3D (#20)
11	13 March 2013	Oz the Great and Powerful	$6,336,580	21 and Over (#2), Broken City (#5), Great Expectations (#13)
12	20 March 2013	Oz the Great and Powerful	$3,583,760	The Incredible Burt Wonderstone (#2), Goddess (#4), Performance (#12), Mama (#14), Mt. Zion (#17)
13	27 March 2013	A Good Day to Die Hard	$4,887,842	Jack the Giant Slayer (#3), Met Opera: Rigoletto (#15)
14	3 April 2013	The Croods	$7,091,584	G.I. Joe: Retaliation (#2), The Host (#5), Hyde Park on Hudson (#7), Escape from Planet Earth (#10), Adventures in Zambezia (#11), Rust and Bone (#13)
15	10 April 2013	The Croods	$5,509,881	Identity Thief (#2), Jurassic Park 3D (#5), Trance (#7), Return to Nim's Island (#13), Saving General Yang (#20)
16	17 April 2013	Oblivion	$4,494,206	Scary Movie 5 (#4), Warm Bodies (#5), Kon-Tiki (#18), First Position (#19), Thérèse Desqueyroux (#20)
17	24 April 2013	The Croods	$3,522,069	Iron Man 3 (#2)^{[A]}, Olympus Has Fallen (#3), The Company You Keep (#9), National Theatre Live: People (#16)
18	1 May 2013	Iron Man 3 †	$17,536,401	Song for Marion (#11), Lucky Di Unlucky Story (#12), Haute Cuisine (#15)
19	8 May 2013	Iron Man 3 †	$7,825,145	The Big Wedding (#2), Drift (#8), The Hunt (#15), Shootout at Wadala (#16)
20	15 May 2013	Star Trek Into Darkness	$6,736,762	The Place Beyond the Pines (#4), Spring Breakers (#7), Evil Dead (#12), Go Goa Gone (#20)
21	22 May 2013	Star Trek Into Darkness	$4,116,786	The Call (#3), Snitch (#4), Tabu (#14), A Place for Me (#15), Rangeelay (#18), Met Opera: Giulio Cesare (#19)
22	29 May 2013	The Hangover Part III	$11,267,127	Dead Man Down (#8), The Reluctant Fundamentalist (#9), Jatts in Golmaal (#12)
23	5 June 2013	The Great Gatsby	$9,042,635	Yeh Jawaani Hai Deewani (#5), A Haunted House (#9), Happiness Never Comes Alone (#14)
24	12 June 2013	Fast & Furious 6	$15,210,215	Yamla Pagla Deewana 2 (#9), National Theatre Live: This House (#11), Still Mine (#13), Farewell, My Queen (#16)
25	19 June 2013	Fast & Furious 6	$5,860,167	The Internship (#3), After Earth (#4), Mud (#11), A Lady in Paris (#15)
26	26 June 2013	World War Z	$7,988,075	Despicable Me 2 (#2), Monsters University (#3), Raanjhanaa (#12), Satellite Boy (#16)
27	3 July 2013	Man of Steel	$12,148,112	Epic (#6), Jatt & Juliet 2 (#10), In the House (#11), The Look of Love (#12), Ghanchakkar (#17), Badges of Fury (#20)
28	10 July 2013	Despicable Me 2	$8,268,397	The Lone Ranger (#4), National Theatre Live: The Audience (#10), A Gun in Each Hand (#11), We Steal Secrets: The Story of WikiLeaks (#14), Blind Detective (#16), Lootera (#17)
29	17 July 2013	The Heat	$5,294,018	Pacific Rim (#3), Bhaag Milkha Bhaag (#12), Much Ado About Nothing (#14), Exhibition: Munch 150 (#19)
30	24 July 2013	The Heat	$3,707,076	This Is the End (#2), The Conjuring (#3), Before Midnight (#12), Only God Forgives (#13)
31	31 July 2013	The Wolverine	$6,112,500	Behind the Candelabra (#7), Best of Luck (#16), SDU: Sex Duties Unit (#19)
32	7 August 2013	The Wolverine	$4,161,479	The World's End (#4), The Way Way Back (#8), Springsteen & I (#14), Naughty Jatts (#19), Dino Time (#20)
33	14 August 2013	Now You See Me	$5,407,147	Pain & Gain (#2), Chennai Express (#8), The Bling Ring (#18)
34	21 August 2013	Elysium	$4,584,035	We're the Millers (#3), Frances Ha (#14), Red Obsession (#15), Once Upon Ay Time In Mumbai Dobaara! (#18)
35	28 August 2013	Elysium	$2,845,104	The Mortal Instruments: City of Bones (#4), Kick-Ass 2 (#5), What Maisie Knew (#10), Unbeatable (#19), Madras Cafe (#20)
36	4 September 2013	RED 2	$1,940,935	Jobs (#6), The Best Offer (#8), You're Next (#10), Satyagraha (#11), Stoker (#15), Pompeii: Captured Live (#16), The Rocket (Maurice Richard) (#20)
37	11 September 2013	White House Down	$2,443,114	Paranoia (#10), Haani (#11), Shuddh Desi Romance (#19)
38	18 September 2013	The Smurfs 2	$2,409,042	Riddick (#3), Blue Jasmine (#4), R.I.P.D. (#9), Grand Masti (#14), Mood Indigo (#18)
39	25 September 2013	Turbo	$3,338,915	Percy Jackson: Sea of Monsters (#3), Planes (#4), One Direction: This Is Us (#6), I'm So Excited (#17), Phata Poster Nikhla Hero (#20)
40	2 October 2013	Grown Ups 2	$5,190,427	Runner Runner (#6), Tim Winton's The Turning (#12), Stories We Tell (#16), Lovelace (#20)
41	9 October 2013	Gravity	$5,546,344	Rush (#6), Thanks for Sharing (#15), Young Detective Dee: Rise of the Sea Dragon (#19)^{[B]}
42	16 October 2013	Gravity	$4,283,186	2 Guns (#2), Diana (#6), The Family (#7), Metallica: Through the Never (#13)
43	23 October 2013	Gravity	$3,265,178	About Time (#2), Prisoners (#3), Mystery Road (#16), Boss (#17), Exhibition: Vermeer and Music (#18), Special ID (#20)
44	30 October 2013	Captain Phillips	$3,044,193	Machete Kills (#13), Alan Partridge: Alpha Papa (#15), Met Opera: Eugene Onegin (#18)
45	6 November 2013	Thor: The Dark World	$9,497,034	The Butler (#5), Krrish 3 (#8), National Theatre Live: Macbeth (#14), Arrambam (#15)
46	13 November 2013	Thor: The Dark World	$5,672,739	The Counselor (#2), Insidious: Chapter 2 (#7), Mr. Pip (#16), Backyard Ashes (#18)
47	20 November 2013	Jackass Presents: Bad Grandpa	$4,452,366	Enough Said (#7), Ram Leela (#10), Bhaji in Problem (#12), The Fifth Estate (#18), Met Opera: The Nose (#20)
48	27 November 2013	The Hunger Games: Catching Fire	$15,994,095	Doctor Who: "The Day of the Doctor" (#3), Filth (#12), Adoration (#14), Gori Tere Pyaar Mein (#15), Singh Saab the Great (#16), 20 Feet from Stardom (#19)
49	4 December 2013	The Hunger Games: Catching Fire	$8,784,971	One Chance (#4), Carrie (#5), Bullett Raja (#18), National Theatre Live: Hamlet (#20)
50	11 December 2013	The Hunger Games: Catching Fire	$4,956,493	Cloudy with a Chance of Meatballs 2 (#2), Delivery Man (#3), Ender's Game (#4), Night Train to Lisbon (#13), National Theatre Live: 50 Years on Stage (#14), The Spectacular Now (#15), Kill Your Darlings (#17), Closed Circuit (#18), The Christmas Candle (#19)
51	18 December 2013	The Hunger Games: Catching Fire	$3,221,031	American Hustle (#2), Battle of the Year (#11), The Gilded Cage (#13), Firestorm (#18)
52	25 December 2013	Anchorman 2: The Legend Continues	$6,640,071	Dhoom 3, Personal Tailor

Notes

- A Iron Man 3 opened on 24 April across Australia, the day before the box office for the week was totaled (which was 25 April that week; as most films open on Thursdays, the Australian box office week "begins" on that date). It managed to debut at #2 from tickets sold in just one day, and nearly topped the box office—The Croods earned $3.5 million, while Iron Man 3 grossed $3.4 million.
- B Madman Entertainment's Reel Anime festival of 2013 peaked inside the top 20 in its second week of release, the week ending 9 October (at #20). It ran for a week in select New Zealand cities, then in Australia from 26 September in Adelaide and 3 October in other locations to 16 October (9 October in Adelaide). The films were: Evangelion: 3.0 You Can (Not) Redo, 009 Re:Cyborg, A Letter to Momo, Ghost in the Shell: Arise and The Garden of Words.

== See also ==
- List of Australian films - Australian films by year
- 2013 in film
