= Red Obsession =

2013 Australian documentary film

- Film poster
- Directed by: David Roach; Warwick Ross
- Written by: David Roach; Warwick Ross
- Produced by: Warwick Ross
- Narrated by: Russell Crowe
- Cinematography: Steve Arnold; Lee Pulbrook
- Edited by: Paul Murphy
- Music by: Burkhard Dallwitz; Amanda Brown
- Production company: Lion Rock Films
- Release date: 2013
- Running time: 75 minutes
- Country: Australia
- Language: English

Red Obsession is a 2013 Australian documentary film which collects interviews with winemakers and wine lovers across the world. The film is narrated by Russell Crowe. Red Obsession was co-directed and co-written by David Roach and Warwick Ross.

== Production ==
Principal photography began in April 2011. The film was co-directed and co-written by David Roach and Warwick Ross. Ross was in charge of production for Lion Rock Films, while the soundtrack was composed by Burkhard Dallwitz and Amanda Brown. Paul Murphy signed on as editor.

This documentary film was edited on Adobe Premiere Pro.

== Release ==
=== Critical response ===
As of 7 September 2013, based on 16 reviews collected by review aggregator Rotten Tomatoes, the film had received a 100% approval rating from critics, with an average score of 7.4/10. Nicole Herrington of The New York Times wrote that the film "may already be [out]dated, since China's wine fever has cooled recently" although adding that "the movie raises legitimate concerns about the cultural and economic implications of status-minded overconsumption". Jordan Hoffman of the New York Daily News described the film as "probing, fascinating". Urban CineFile's Louise Keller stated that Red Obsession "does justice to the many facets of the wine it describes". Matthew Toomey of The Film Pie labelled it as "one of the year's best documentaries". Ed Gibbs of The Sunday Age found the documentary to be "remarkably enlightening". Keith Uhlich of Time Out New York offered that "[t]he reliance on talking-head testimonials leaves a weak aftertaste, but it's a palate-pleasing provocation nonetheless". Doris Toumarkine of Film Journal International lauded the film's "superb" cinematography. Kenji Fujishima of Slant Magazine awarded the film three out of four stars, commenting that it "may well inspire one to a higher appreciation of wine while also bringing about a greater awareness of the market forces that turn even the highest art into commodities". Ronnie Scheib of Variety opined that "[t]he film's rather simplistic cultural juxtapositions, pitting artistic appreciators against status-seeking philistines, work best when narrowly focused on the subject of wine."

=== Awards and nominations ===
Award	Category	Subject	Result
AACTA Award (3rd)	Best Feature Length Documentary	Warwick Ross	Won
AACTA Award (3rd)	Best Direction in a Documentary	Warwick Ross	Won
AACTA Award (3rd)	Best Direction in a Documentary	David Roach	Won
AACTA Award (3rd)	Best Cinematography in a Documentary	Steve Arnold	Nominated
AACTA Award (3rd)	Best Cinematography in a Documentary	Lee Pulbrook	Nominated
AACTA Award (3rd)	Best Sound in a Documentary	Burkhard Dallwitz	Nominated
AACTA Award (3rd)	Best Sound in a Documentary	Amanda Brown	Nominated
AACTA Award (3rd)	Best Sound in a Documentary	Liam Egan	Nominated
AACTA Award (3rd)	Best Sound in a Documentary	Andrew Neil	Nominated

== See also ==
- List of 2013 box office number-one films in Australia
