= Narcolepsy Network =

Non-profit organisation

- Website: narcolepsynetwork.org

Narcolepsy Network, Inc. is a non-profit national patient support organization that helps raise awareness and advocates for research and development for the understanding and treatment of narcolepsy. The organization is located in North Kingstown, Rhode Island.

== History ==
Narcolepsy Network's roots can be traced back to its predecessor, the American Narcolepsy Association (ANA), for which it formerly functioned as a task force. In May 1985, the ANA began its reorganization, leading to the newly formed Narcolepsy Network.

== The Narcolepsy Network Database ==
Initially a task force was put together of a small group of members to determine the structure of the database. Because the data was coming from a number of different centres, this task force had to standardise the data so the differently sourced data was compatible. A key feature of the database is a web based, protected data entry interface, which makes sure the data that is entered is standardised and usable. A separate children's database was also produced.

=== Structure and sources of Data ===
The date is sourced from 27 difference sleep centres, across 13 different European countries. The data is split into two bodies, supplementary and mandatory. The cases are meant to be followed up - that is, the follow-up information about the outcome of the case needs to be entered into the database to validate it. The database has strong security protocols that protect the privacy of the patients details.

=== Database size ===
As of 2015, the database held details on 1079 patients from 18 different sleep centres.
