= Seiji Nishino =

American psychologist

Seiji Nishino is a Japanese neuroscientist and writer. He is a professor emeritus of psychiatry and behavioral sciences at the Stanford University. He is also the director of Stanford Center for Sleep Sciences and Medicine.

Nishino, a well-known sleep researcher, he researches sleep disorders, sleep and circadian physiology using animal models. Since 2016, he has been director of Good Quality Sleep Research Organization.

He is also the author of a best-selling Japanese book on sleep.

== Early life and career ==
Born in Kawachinagano, Osaka Prefecture in 1955, Nishino studied at Osaka Kyoiku University High School Tennoji school. He graduated from Osaka Medical College.

In 1987, he joined the Stanford Center for Sleep Sciences and Medicine at Stanford University.

In 1999, he discovered the causative gene in canine familial narcolepsy.

In 2000, he identified the main developmental mechanism of human narcolepsy as the center of the group.

In 2005, Nishino became director of the Stanford Institute for Sleep and Biological Rhythms.

In 2007, he became professor of psychiatry at the University of Stanford.

== Bibliography ==
- Nishino, Seiji; Sakurai, Takeshi (22 November 2007). The Orexin/Hypocretin System: Physiology and Pathophysiology (Contemporary Clinical Neuroscience)
- Seiji, Nishino. The Stanford Method for Ultimate Sound Sleep (スタンフォード式 最高の睡眠, sutanfo-do shiki saikou no suimin; 5 March 2017)
- Seiji, Nishino (18 March 2020). El arte del descanso: Descubre el método para dormir bien y descansar mejor (Spanish Edition)
- Seiji, Nishino (1 November 2020). Stanford Sleeping Habits (Chinese Edition)

== Select publications ==
- High rebound mattress toppers facilitate core body temperature drop and enhance deep sleep in the initial phase of nocturnal sleep
- An overview of hypocretin based therapy in narcolepsy
- Advances in pharmaceutical treatment options for narcolepsy
- Low dose of aripiprazole advanced sleep rhythm and reduced nocturnal sleep time in the patients with delayed sleep phase syndrome: an open-labeled clinical observation
- Mast cell involvement in glucose tolerance impairment caused by chronic mild stress with sleep disturbance
- N-Methyl-D-aspartate receptor antibody could be a cause of catatonic symptoms in psychiatric patients: case reports and methods for detection
- Wake-promoting effects of ONO-4127Na, a prostaglandin DP1 receptor antagonist, in hypocretin/orexin deficient narcoleptic mice
- Decline of CSF orexin (hypocretin) levels in Prader-Willi syndrome
- A PERIOD3 variant causes a circadian phenotype and is associated with a seasonal mood trait

== Awards ==
- Narcolepsy Network Scientist Award
- NIH Mentored Research Scientist Developmental Award
- David Amar Israel Sleep Research Society Award

== Other sources ==
- Can sleep prevent Alzheimer's?
