= Love of My Life (2013 film) =

- Directed by: Michael Budd
- Written by: Liam Barrett
- Produced by: Michael Budd
- Starring: Peter O'Brien; Diarmid Heidenreich; Michael Budd; Bel Delia
- Cinematography: Steve Arnold
- Edited by: Ryan McGuire
- Music by: Enrica Sciandrone
- Distributed by: Gravitas Ventures
- Release date: 10 November 2013
- Running time: 96 minutes
- Country: Australia
- Language: English

Love of My Life is a 2013 Australian horror/thriller directed and produced by Michael Budd in his directorial debut. The film stars Budd, Peter O'Brien, Diarmid Heidenreich and Bel Delia.

== Plot ==
The film follows Julius, a man who mysteriously wakes up strapped to a hospital bed and is given the choice by what seems to be a deranged surgeon to either survive 5 days of torture, or say "I quit" and have the love of his life killed. The film follows Julius's fight for survival and the early stages of his relationship through a series of flash backs. The flashbacks then start becoming more intense and filter into his real world.

== Cast ==
- Peter O'Brien as Thomas
- Diarmid Heidenreich as Julius
- Michael Budd as Reggie
- Bel Delia as Nicole
- Isaro Kayitesi as Keria
- Rob Messer as Samson
- Jean Pierre Yerma as Bar man

== Production ==
The film was shot completely in Sydney, Bathurst and Orange, NSW, Australia.

== Release ==
The film had its premiere screening at the 2013 Mt. Hood Independent Film Festival. The film went on to win Best Horror/Thriller at the festival. The film has also been set for a February 2014 Video on Demand release with Gravitas Ventures.
