= Peter O'Brien (actor) =

Australian actor (born 1960)

- Born: 25 March 1960 (age 66); Murray Bridge, South Australia, Australia
- Occupation: Actor
- Years active: 1982–present
- Spouses: Joanna Riding (m. 1990; div. 1994) Miranda Otto (m. 2003)
- Children: 1

Peter O'Brien (born 25 March 1960) is an Australian actor, best known for his role as an original cast member in 1985 of Australian soap opera Neighbours as Shane Ramsay. He has also acted in numerous British and American productions.

== Career ==
O'Brien played a regular role in short-lived soap opera Starting Out (1983), and then had guest roles in Carson's Law in 1983 and Prisoner in 1984 and appeared in The Henderson Kids. He was then cast as Shane Ramsay, a regular original character in soap opera Neighbours on the Seven Network in 1985. He became one of the serial's most popular cast members, continuing in the series until he quit in 1987. After leaving Neighbours, O'Brien joined the main cast of drama serial The Flying Doctors as Captain Sam Patterson from July 1987 until 1991.

In 1994, O'Brien sent up his soap opera star past by taking a regular role in Psycho Ward 10, a soap opera parody in The All New Alexei Sayle Show.

O'Brien took on the role of surgical registrar Mr. Cyril 'Scissors' Smedley in the popular BBC series Cardiac Arrest through the second and third series between 1995 and 1996.

He later starred in television series Queer as Folk, White Collar Blue and Gossip Girl.

O'Brien has appeared in numerous miniseries, including The Day of the Roses and Through My Eyes (the story of Lindy Chamberlain). He has also guest starred on numerous television series, including Halifax f.p.. For his work, O'Brien has won Australian Film Institute and Logie Awards. He also appeared as Carl Morgan in Spellbinder: Land of the Dragon Lord, and he appeared in the 1998 Australian/Brisbane comedy television series of Minty. In 2009 he played Sydney underworld figure and racing identity George Freeman in the series Underbelly: A Tale of Two Cities. He later reprised his role as George Freeman in the follow-up in the Underbelly series The Golden Mile.

In early 2007, O'Brien joined the cast of BBC medical drama Casualty as consultant Theo "Stitch" Lambert. He also appeared in the ITV police drama The Bill in which he played corrupt Detective Inspector Peter Cavanaugh.

He appeared as Ed in The Waters of Mars, the second of the 2009 specials of Doctor Who.

In 2022, it was announced O'Brien had reprised his role of Shane Ramsay in Neighbours, following the news that the serial would be concluding later that year. In November 2024, O'Brien returned to Neighbours for a guest stint, followed by another in March 2025 for the show's 40th anniversary.

== Awards ==
O'Brien has won several acting awards in his career. He won two Logie Awards - one in 1987 for the 'Most Popular Actor' (for his role in Neighbours) and one in 2003 for the 'Most Outstanding Actor' (for his role in White Collar Blue).

== Personal life ==
O'Brien was in a relationship with his Neighbours co-star Elaine Smith for four years. He married actress Joanna Riding on 24 December 1990, after meeting while they were both starring in a production of The Wizard of Oz in England. Their separation was announced in December 1993.

On 1 January 2003, O'Brien married actress Miranda Otto, after the two had met while performing in A Doll's House. They have one child, a daughter, who was born on 1 April 2005.

== Filmography ==
=== Film ===
Year	Title	Role	Notes
1983	The Mortal Coil	Hugh	Short film
1996	Hotel de Love	Norman Carey	Feature film
1996	Michael Collins	Pianist in restaurant (uncredited)	Feature film
1999	Sally Marshall Is Not an Alien	David Lawson	Feature film
1999	Sabrina Down Under	Dr. Julian Martin	TV movie
2002	The Pact	Roy Folksdale	Feature film
2005	Hell Has Harbour Views	Tim Sullivan	TV movie
2006	The Return	Terry Stahl	Feature film
2006	Fatal Contact: Bird Flu in America	Alan	TV movie
2009	X-Men Origins: Wolverine	John Howlett	Feature film
2012	Dangerous Remedy	Dr. Barry Smith	TV movie
2012	Hanyut	Kasper Almayer	Feature film
2013	Love of My Life	Surgeon / Thomas	Feature film
2014	The Killing Field	Inspector Lachlan McKenzie	TV movie
2016	Maximum Ride	Jeb	Feature film
2018	What Still Remains	The Prisoner	Feature film

=== Television ===
Year	Title	Role	Notes	Ref
1983	Starting Out	Craig Holt	TV series	
1984	Special Squad	Billy	TV series, 1 episode: "War"	
1984	Prisoner	Tim Carter	TV series, 1 episode	
1985–87, 2022, 2024, 2025	Neighbours	Shane Ramsay	TV series, 304 episodes	
1988–91	The Flying Doctors	Captain Sam Patterson	TV series	
1991	The Trials of Oz	James Anderson	BBC dramatisation of the 1971 trial	
1992	Cluedo	Warren 'Axeman' Hackett	TV series, 1 episode	
1993	Taggart	Bill Hamilton	TV series, 1 episode	
1994	The All New Alexei Sayle Show	Dr Scott Jordan	TV series, season 1 (segment: "Psycho Ward 10")	
1995–96	Cardiac Arrest	Mr. Cyril 'Scissors' Smedley	TV series, seasons 2-3	
1997	The Day of the Roses	Boris Osman	TV miniseries	
1997	Spellbinder: Land of the Dragon Lord	Carl Morgan	TV series	
1998	Minty	Ric da Silva	TV series	
1999	Queer as Folk	Cameron Roberts	TV series	
1999	See How They Run	Don Morton / Cassidy	TV series	
2000	The Knock	Glen Vaughan	TV series, 4 episodes	
2000–01	Water Rats	Matthew Grierson	TV series, 3 episodes	
2001	Relic Hunter	Allan Devaut	TV series, 1 episode	
2002	Young Lions	Daryll Flynn	TV series, 1 episode	
2002–03	White Collar Blue	Detective Joe Hill	TV series	
2003	Code 11–14	Detective McElroy		
2004	Through My Eyes: The Lindy Chamberlain Story	Ian Barker Q.C.	TV miniseries	
2004	The Bill	Detective Inspector Peter Cavanaugh	TV series, 6 episodes	
2005	Blue Heelers	Dr. Peter Nelson	TV series, 2 episodes	
2006	Nightmares and Dreamscapes: From the Stories of Stephen King	Keenan	TV miniseries	
2007	Gossip Girl	Photographer	TV series, 1 episode	
2007	Casualty	Theo 'Stitch' Lambert	TV series, 18 episodes	
2008	City Homicide	Warren Endicot	TV series, 1 episode	
2009	Underbelly: A Tale of Two Cities	George Freeman	TV miniseries, 10 episodes	
2009	A World Away	John		
2009	Doctor Who	Ed Gold	TV series, 1 episode: "The Waters of Mars"	
2009	Rogue Nation	John Stephen Jr 009		
2009	All Saints	Sam Whittaker	TV series, 1 episode	
2009	30 Seconds	Bill Brooker	TV series	
2010	Underbelly: The Golden Mile	George Freeman	TV miniseries, 3 episodes	
2010	Dance Academy	Sebastian	TV series, 2 episodes	
2012	Miss Fisher's Murder Mysteries	René Dubois	T V series, 1 episode	
2015	Winter	Detective Inspector Lachlan McKenzie	TV series	
2018	Lake Alice	Greg Thomas		
2018	GLOW	Rick Hollander	TV series, 2 episodes	
2018	Tidelands	Bill Sentelle	TV series, 7 episodes	
2018	The OA	Duke	TV series, 1 episode	
2019	Breaker	Finch		
2020	Wentworth	Tony Cockburn	TV series, 1 episode	
2021	The Unusual Suspects	Nick	TV miniseries	
2021	The Moth Effect		TV series, 1 episode	
2021	Sola			
2022	Grey Nomads	Luca Rossi	TV series, 6 episodes	
2022	Darby and Joan	Chris	TV series, 1 episode	
2022	Riptide	Sean Weston	TV series, 4 episodes	
2024	Ladies in Black	Don Holloway	1 episode	
2024	Return to Paradise	Artie O'Farrell	TV series 1 episode	

=== Video games ===
Year	Title	Role	Notes
2016	Battlefield 1	Frederick Bishop	Video game

== Theatre ==
Year	Title	Role	Notes
2003	A Doll's House		Sydney Theatre Company
