= Barrow =

Barrow may refer to:

- Tumulus, a burial mound

== Places ==
=== Australia ===
- Barrow Creek, Northern Territory
  - Barrow Creek Telegraph Station

=== England ===
- Barrow-in-Furness, Cumbria
  - Borough of Barrow-in-Furness, former local authority encompassing the wider area
  - Barrow and Furness (UK Parliament constituency)
- Barrow, Cheshire
- Barrow, Gloucestershire
- Barrow, Lancashire
- Barrow, Rutland
- Barrow, Shropshire
- Barrow, Somerset
- Barrow, Suffolk
- Barrow (Lake District), a fell in the county of Cumbria
- Barrow upon Humber, Lincolnshire
- Barrow upon Soar, Leicestershire
- Barrow upon Trent, Derbyshire

=== Ireland ===
- River Barrow, the second-longest river in Ireland
- Barrow Harbour, home of Tralee Golf Club

=== United States ===
- Barrow County, Georgia
- Barrow, Illinois, an unincorporated community
- Barrow Canyon, Alaska
- Utqiaġvik, Alaska, a city, formerly known as Barrow

=== The Moon ===
- Barrow (crater)

== People ==
- Barrow (name), a surname, and persons with the name
- Barrows (name), a surname, and persons with the name

== Other uses ==
- Barrow A.F.C., an association football club based in Barrow-in-Furness
- Barrow Raiders, a rugby league club based in Barrow-in-Furness
- Barrow's Stores, in Birmingham, England
- Barrow (sculpture), a sculpture in Indianapolis by American artist Jill Viney
- A castrated male domestic pig
- Wheelbarrow, a tool for carrying cargo

== See also ==
- Barrow Island (disambiguation)
- Barrow Hill (disambiguation)
- Barra (disambiguation)
- Justice Barrows (disambiguation)
- Barrowcliffe (name)
- Barrel (disambiguation)
