= Tournament (disambiguation) =

A tournament is a form of organized competition.

Tournament may also refer to:

- Tournament (medieval), a chivalrous competition of the Middle Ages
- Tournament (card game), a solitaire card game
- Tournament (graph theory), a kind of directed graph

== Media ==
- The Tournament (TV series), a 2005–2006 Canadian TV show
- The Tournament (game show), a 2021–2022 British game show
- "The Tournament", an episode of The Wind in the Willows
- The Tournament (Clarke novel), a 2002 novel by John Clarke
- The Tournament (Reilly novel), a 2013 novel by Matthew Reilly
- The Tournament, a 2025 novel by Rebecca Barrow
- The Tournament (Révoil), an 1812 painting by Pierre Révoil
- Speedball 2: Tournament, a 2007 video game

=== Films ===
- The Tournament (1974 film) (Cantonese: Chung taai kuen taan sang sei chin), a Hong Kong film featuring Yuen Wah
- The Tournament (2009 film), an action film starring Robert Carlyle
- Tournament (film), a 2010 Malayalam-language film
- The Tournament (2015 film), a 2015 French film

== Other uses ==
- Tournament Park, Pasadena, California, US; a park

== See also ==
- La Tourney, Saint Lucia; a town
- Tournament sort, a sorting algorithm
- Tournament selection, a selection algorithm
- Royal Tournament, a 20th century British military tattoo
- Tournament of Champions (disambiguation)
