= Barrows (name) =

Barrows is a surname. Notable people with this surname include:

- Alice Barrows (1878–1954), American secretary
- Annie Barrows (born 1962), American author
- Arthur S. Barrows (1884–1963), American businessman, former president of Sears
- Augustus Barrows (1838–1885), American lumberman and politician
- Chester W. Barrows (1872–1931), Justice of the Rhode Island Supreme Court
- Cliff Barrows (1923–2016), American minister
- Cuke Barrows (1883–1955), Major League Baseball player
- David Prescott Barrows (1873–1954), American anthropologist
- Diana Barrows (born 1966), American actress
- Eddy Barrows (active since 2003), Brazilian comic book artist
- Edward M. Barrows (born 1946), American entomologist
- Elijah Porter Barrows (1807–1888), American clergyman and writer
- F. Jay Barrows (born 1956), American politician
- Frank Barrows (1844–1922), Major League Baseball player
- Geoffrey Barrows (born 1970), American inventor
- George Barrows (1914–1994), American actor
- Griffin Barrows (born 1987 or 1988), American gay pornographic film actor
- Harlan H. Barrows (1877–1960), American geographer
- Henry A. Barrows (1875–1945), American actor
- Henry Dwight Barrows (1825–1914), American teacher and business man
- Howard Barrows (1928–2011), American physician
- Isabel Barrows (1845–1913), first female US State department employee
- John Henry Barrows (1847–1902), American clergy man
- Johnny Barrows, title character in 1971 American film Mean Johnny Barrows
- Jim Barrows (1944–2024), American skier
- Leland Barrows (1906–1988), American ambassador
- Lewis O. Barrows (1893–1967), American politician
- Mercer Barrows (active since 1982), American producer and director
- Pelham A. Barrows (1861–1939), American politician
- R. Barrows (active since 1990s), American musician, designer, and writer
- Samuel J. Barrows (1845–1909), American politician
- Scott Barrows (born 1963), American football player
- Sydney Biddle Barrows (born 1952), American businesswoman
- Thomas Barrows III (active 2008–2010), American sailor
- W.A. Barrows (active since 2004), Labor Member of the United States Railroad Retirement Board
- Walter B. Barrows (1855–1923), American naturalist

== See also ==
- Barrow (surname)
