= Myra De Groot =

British actress (1937–1988)

Myra de Groot
- Myra de Groot as Eileen Clarke in TV series Neighbours
- Born: Myra Tania De Groot; 4 July 1937; Westminster, London
- Died: 4 April 1988 (aged 50); Melbourne, Victoria, Australia
- Occupation: Actress
- Years active: 1955–1988

Myra Tania de Groot (4 July 1937 – 4 April 1988) was a British-born theatre and television actress, and agent. She performed in the United Kingdom, United States, New Zealand and Australia.

== Professional career ==
De Groot was born in Westminster, London, England.

With a passion for doing Shirley Temple impressions as a child, her parents enrolled her at the Italia Conti Stage School at the age of 10. At the age of 13, de Groot appeared in Annie Get Your Gun at the London Coliseum which was her first professional West End show.

In the late 1950's, de Groot appeared in the London productions of The Pajama Game as well as Ulysses in Nighttown in which she played Kitty.

Arriving in America from Britain in 1958 she appeared in roles for most of the 1960s there, appearing on TV series including Bewitched, The Monkees, Perry Mason, and Here Come the Brides.

She performed at the noted New York Off-Broadway theatre Upstairs at the Downstairs in Ben Bagley's last revue (Seven Come Eleven) in 1962 with Hal Buckley, Nancy Preiser and Cy Young. After leaving America, de Groot resided in New Zealand between 1972 and 1980, where she appeared in many theatre roles and the 1978 film Angel Mine. She also wrote, directed and produced stage plays.

Her latter career was based in Australia, after having emigrated there in 1980, with roles in serials The Sullivans, two roles in Prisoner and a few telemovies.

De Groot also appeared in the film Norman Loves Rose, for which she was nominated for an AFI Award for Best Supporting Actress.

Her final role was in Neighbours as Eileen Clarke - a role in which De Groot appeared onscreen in the United Kingdom for fifteen months after she had died due to the fact the show aired significantly far behind the Australian airdate.

== Filmography ==
FILM

| Year | Film | Role | Type |
|---|---|---|---|
| 1976 | The Park Terrace Murder | Mrs. Robinson | TV movie |
| 1978 | Angel Mine | Nun | Short film |
| 1981 | Air Hawk | Recurring role: Aunt Ellie | TV movie / TV pilot |
| 1982 | Norman Loves Rose | Mother | Feature film |
| 1983 | Zero Zero | Guest role: Mother 210 | TV movie |

TELEVISION

| Year | Film | Role | Type |
|---|---|---|---|
| 1967 | Bewitched | Guest roles: Hazel Carter / Receptionist | TV series, 2 episodes |
| 1968 | The Monkees | Guest role: Mary Friar | TV series, 1 episode |
| | Perry Mason | | TV series |
| 1969 | Here Come the Brides | Guest role: Maude | TV series, 1 episode |
| 1974-75 | Buck House | Lead role: Mrs. Platt | TV series, 14 episodes |
| 1978 | Fuller's Earth | Regular role: Natalie | TV series |
| 1979 | The Sullivans | Recurring guest role: Laura Watkins | TV series |
| 1979, 1982 | The Mike Walsh Show | Guest - Herself | TV series, 1 episode |
| 1980 | Lucinda Brayford | Guest role: Lady Susannah Crittenden | TV miniseries, 1 episode |
| 1980; 1984 | Prisoner | Recurring guest roles: Barbara Krantz / Sheila Hawkins | TV series, 5 episodes |
| 1982; 1983 | The Mike Walsh Show | Guest - Herself | TV series, 1 episode |
| 1983; 1984 | The Mike Walsh Show | Guest - Herself | TV series, 1 episode |
| 1984 | The Mike Walsh Show | Guest - Herself | TV series, 1 episode |
| 1984 | Special Squad | Guest role: Grace Kiddell | TV series, 1 episode |
| 1984 | Carson's Law | Guest role: Mrs. Cameron | TV series, 1 episode |
| 1985 | Palace of Dreams | Recurring role: Sima | TV miniseries, 3 episodes |
| 1985 | Barmitzvah | Starring role | TV drama |
| 1985-88 | Neighbours | Recurring role: Eileen Clarke | TV series, 167 episodes |
| 1987 | The Far Country | Recurring role: District Nurse | TV miniseries, 2 episodes |
| 1987 | In Between | Guest role: Lil | TV series, 1 episode |

== Theatre ==
De Groot acted in the United Kingdom, New Zealand and Australia in a variety of roles on stage:

- Frome Here and There - Royal Court Theatre, London (1955)
- Mister Venus - Prince of Wales Theatre, London (1958) - as "Married woman"
- Ulysses in Nighttown - Arts Theatre, London (May 1959) - as Kitty
- Pieces of Eight - Apollo Theatre, London (September 1959)
- Seven Come Eleven - Upstairs at the Downstairs, New York (August 1962)
- Riverwind - Westport Country Playhouse, Wesport, CT (July 1966)
- Mame - Honolulu Concert Hall, HI (June 1968) - as Agnes Gooch
- Mame - San Bernardino, CA (November 1970) - as Agnes Gooch
- There's a Leek in your Hat - Mercury Theatre, Auckland (October 1972)
- Tarantara! taranatara! - Mercury Theatre, Auckland (February 1976)
- Viva Mexico - North Shore Operatic Society, Auckland (March 1977)
- Noel & Cole - The Blue Cockatoo, Sydney (1982)
- Torch Song Trilogy - Her Majesty's Theatre, Sydney (1984) - as Mrs Beckoff
- Spookhouse - Playbox Theatre, Melbourne (1987)
- Nunsense - Comedy Theatre, Melbourne (1987) - as Sister Hubert

== Personal life and death ==
De Groot was Jewish. She was married three times.

In February 1988, it was reported de Groot had been diagnosed with cancer and had been undergoing treatment at the Peter MacCallum Cancer Centre in Melbourne.

De Groot died from cancer, aged 50 on 4 April 1988. De Groot had been undergoing treatment for eight weeks prior to her death.

After learning of her death just minutes before appearing in a live interview on the BBC's Open Air in Manchester, de Groot's Neighbours co-star Jason Donovan broke down during the interview as he paid tribute to his former colleague, stating: "It has really hit me extremely hard - we were very good friends. I can't begin to tell you how lovely she was."

Following her death, the Myra de Groot Foundation was established. De Groot had wanted the foundation to be established for the Peter McCallum Hospital, in a bid to encourage more doctors to specialise in cancer research.

De Groot's former Neighbours co-star Kylie Flinker, who had originated the character of Lucy Robinson was recognised for organising a junior theatresports night to raise money for the Myra de Groot Foundation and was subsequently presented with a certificate of appreciation by Melbourne lord mayor Winsome McCaughey.

De Groot was cremated with her ashes being placed atop of her best friend's piano.
