= Shane Maloney =

Australian author (born 1953)

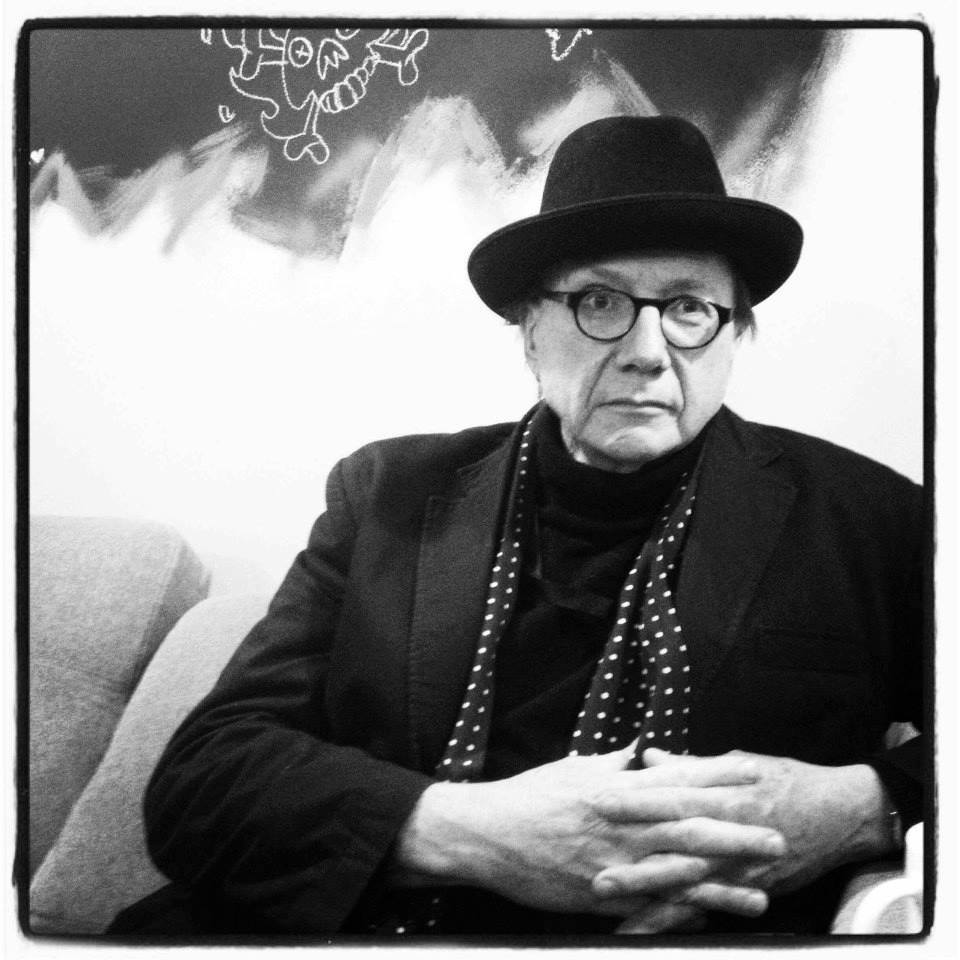
- Born: 1953 (age 72–73); Hamilton, Victoria, Australia
- Occupation: Novelist
- Writing career
- Years active: 1994–present
- Genre: Crime fiction
- Notable work: Murray Whelan series
- Notable awards: Ned Kelly Awards for Crime Fiction

Shane Maloney (born 1953, in Hamilton, Victoria) is a Melbourne author best known as the creator of the Murray Whelan series of crime novels.

== Life and career ==
Maloney was educated at Christian Brothers' College, St Kilda (CBC St Kilda). He started writing after studying politics and Asian history at the Australian National University. He has worked in a wide range of situations, having held the positions of: Director of the Melbourne Comedy Festival (1987–1989), Cultural Director of Melbourne's Olympic bid and swimming pool lifeguard.

Maloney lives in Melbourne.

== Murray Whelan series ==
The six titles in the Murray Whelan crime thriller series (Stiff, The Brush-Off, Nice Try, The Big Ask, Something Fishy and most recently Sucked In) all feature the eponymous Murray Whelan, initially as a Labor Party staffer who provides support to a Victorian State Government minister but later as a member of the Victorian State parliament. The novels are ordered chronologically and follow Whelan's progression through the Labor Party's ranks during the late 1980s and early 1990s at a time when the Labor Party was in power at both a federal and state level in Victoria.

Each novel follows the protagonist, Murray Whelan, as he attempts to uncover the truth behind murders, fraudulent schemes and shady dealings in and around the suburbs of Melbourne. Although his motives are usually genuine - protecting his own tenuous employment and sparing his minister from political death - Whelan inevitably ends up in over his head after implicating himself and faces enmity from the criminals, the police, party colleagues and his estranged wife who wants custody of their son.

The series of novels trace Whelan's career and in each novel he is older, wiser and has risen to a more senior position. Maloney described the progress as, "episodic biography of Murray Whelan as he falls up the political ladder".

Maloney has said that he wanted "Melbourne [as] a character in the stories". His distinctly Australian writing style stems from his use of local vernacular and dry wit. Maloney lives in Brunswick, a suburb in Melbourne's inner north.

The first two novels in the series, Stiff and The Brush Off were adapted for screen by John Clarke and shown as telemovies on the Seven Network in 2004 starring David Wenham in the lead role, as part of The Murray Whelan Series.

== Official recognition ==
In 2009, Maloney received a Lifetime Achievement Award from the Crime Writers Association of Australia.

The Brush-Off won the Ned Kelly Award for Crime Fiction in 1997 and was shortlisted for the Premiers Literary Award as well as being set as an English text for Victorian secondary students.

Shane Maloney was the subject of a 2005 Archibald Prize painting by artist Rick Amor.

== Bibliography ==
=== Books ===
==== Murray Whelan crime fiction novels ====
- Stiff (1994) (adapted as a 2004 TV movie starring David Wenham)
- The Brush-Off (1996) (adapted as a 2004 TV movie starring David Wenham)
- Nice Try (1998)
- The Big Ask (2000)
- Something Fishy 2002)
- Sucked In (2007)

==== Non-fiction ====
- The Happy Phrase (2004)
- Australian Encounters (2010) Illustrated by Chris Grosz

=== Essays and journalism ===
- Maloney, Shane and Chris Grosz (illus.) (April 2009). "Encounters: Paul Keating & Jack Lang". The Monthly. 44: 74.
