= Zac Power =

Australian children's book series

Zac Power is an Australian children's book series by a team of writers under the pseudonym H. I. Larry. The series follows the adventures of Zac Power, a twelve-year-old boy, and his fifteen-year-old brother, Leon. Zac is a secret agent for the fictitious spy agency GIB (Government Investigation Bureau), and Zac's adventures often see him saving the world. The series was published by Hardie Grant Egmont.

== Test Drive and Spy Camp/Spy Recruit ==
The Test Drive and Spy Camp/Spy Recruit series are written for younger readers, with larger print and lower word counts. Both series are listed on the NSW Premier's Reading Challenge years 7–8 list, whereas the other Zac Power series are on the years 9–13 list.

Test Drive consists of 16 books, written by Louise Park (published 2009–2010) and Spy Camp of 8 (published 2010).

== Mega, Extreme, and Ultimate ==
The Mega Mission (2008) and Extreme Mission (2009) series each have a continuing story that spans four books. They have both also been published as single-volume “four books in one” editions. Authorship for all 8 books is claimed by Chris Morphew.

Zac Power Ultimate Mission is a single-volume chapter book (264 pages).

== Special Files ==
Published in 2011, each book in the Special Files series contains two stories from the original Zac Power series.

== List of titles ==
Author notes: [HB] Hilary Badger; [MB] Meredith Badger; [CM] Chris Morphew; [CMi] Chris Miles; [ML] Mat Larkin;

=== Original series ===
1. Poison Island [HB]
2. Deep Waters [HB]
3. Mind Games [HB]
4. Frozen Fear [HB] [Bestseller]
5. Tomb of Doom [MB]
6. Night Raid [HB]
7. Lunar Strike
8. Sudden Drop
9. Blockbuster [HB] [Bestseller]
10. Shockwave [Bestseller]
11. High Risk
12. Undercover
13. Sky High [CM] [Bestseller]
14. Volcanic Panic [CM]
15. Boot Camp [HB]
16. Swamp Race [CM]
17. Thrill Ride [Bestseller]
18. Horror House [Bestseller]
19. Close Shave [CM]
20. Shipwreck
21. Overdrive
22. River Rampage
23. Foul Play
24. Fossil Fury [CMi] [Bestseller]
25. Shock Music [ML] [Bestseller]

=== Special titles ===
1. Ultimate Mission [CMi]

=== Test drive ===
1. Zac’s Moon Trip
2. Zac’s Wild Rescue
3. Zac’s Icy Pole
4. Zac’s Sticky Fix
5. Zac’s Freaky Frogs
6. Zac’s Ski Mission
7. Zac’s Bank Bust
8. Zac’s Shark Attack
9. Zac’s Power On
10. Zac’s Water World
11. Zac’s Rocket Launch
12. Zac’s Skate Break
13. Zac’s Double Dare
14. Zac’s Quicksand
15. Zac’s High Dive
16. Zac’s Space Race

=== Spy Camp/Spy Recruit ===
1. Zac Blasts Off
2. Zac Strikes Out
3. Zac Cracks Down
4. Zac Climbs High
5. Zac Runs Wild
6. Zac Wipes Out
7. Zac Jets On
8. Zac Heats Up

=== Mega Mission ===
1. Base Camp
2. Code Red
3. Moon Rider
4. High Stakes

All four books published 2008; Zac Power Mega Missions collection published 2009.

=== Extreme Mission ===
1. Sand Storm
2. Dark Tower
3. Ice Patrol
4. Water Blast

All four books published 2009; Zac Power Extreme Missions collection published 2010.

=== Special Files ===
1. The Fear Files (consists of Horror House & Thrill Ride)
2. The Rock Star Files (consists of Blockbuster & Shock Music)
3. The Underwater Files (consists of Deep Waters & Shipwreck)
4. The Sky Files (consists of Sky High & Lunar Strike)
5. The Undercover Files (consists of Boot Camp & Undercover)
6. The City Files (consists of Fossil Fury & Mind Games)
7. The Volcano Files (consists of Poison Island & Volcanic Panic)
8. The Desert Files (consists of Sudden Drop & Tomb of Doom)

== Film adaptation ==
On 1 May 2019, Screen Australia announced funding for an animated film adaptation called Zac Power the Movie. Australian TV producer David Webster, who created Erky Perky, will direct the film. It is based on a script written by John Armstrong and will be produced by Barbara Stephen, Patrick Egerton and Celine Goetz, who have all worked on various Australian animated films with Cheeky Little Media and Flying Bark Productions.

The film will be produced by Cheeky Little Media and Flying Bark Productions in association with Pixel Zoo Animation Studios. Cast members include Kylie Cantrall, Matt Lucas, David Wenham, and Ed Oxenbould. American film studio Paramount Pictures acquired distribution rights for the film in Australia and New Zealand while Studio 100 Film handles international sales.

The film will be released on 7 January 2027.
