= Barrel roll (disambiguation) =

A barrel roll is a vehicle maneuver mostly done in aircraft.

Barrel roll may also refer to:

- Barrel Roll (G.I. Joe), a fictional character in the G.I. Joe universe
- Barrel roll (turn), a type of airborne rotation performed in dance
- Operation Barrel Roll, military operation
- Competitive barrel rolling, a sport
- Barrel Roll, an obstacle in Kunoichi
- Barrel Roll, a maneuver in the Star Fox video game series commonly instructed by the character Peppy.

== See also ==
- 540 kick, advanced barrel roll in martial arts
- "Roll Out the Barrel", a World War II song
- Reverse barrel roll, a dance move
- Barrel (disambiguation)
- Roll (disambiguation)
