= The Big Picture (2014 film) =

Documentary film

- Directed by: John Doggett-Williams
- Written by: John Doggett-Williams
- Based on: The Life and Cinema of Charles Chauvel by Susanne Chauvel Carlsson
- Produced by: John Doggett-Williams
- Narrated by: Bryan Dawe
- Edited by: John Doggett-Williams
- Production company: Umbrella Entertainment
- Release date: 2014
- Running time: 74 minutes
- Country: Australia
- Language: English

The Big Picture is a documentary film directed by John Doggett-Williams about filmmakers Charles and Elsa Chauvel and their eight feature films made between 1926 and 1955.

The film, which runs for 74 minutes, is included as an "extra" in each of Umbrella Entertainment's series Charles Chauvel Collection, published both as individual titles and as a boxed set.

The film has extensive interviews with Susanne Chauvel Carlsson, Michael Pate, and Ric Carlsson as well as documentary footage of the Chauvels, with representative out-takes from each film. Bryan Dawe provided the commentary.

The Big Picture is based on The Life and Cinema of Charles Chauvel by Susanne Chauvel Carlsson (1930 – 19 March 2013), daughter of Charles and Elsa Chauvel.
