= Barrel (disambiguation) =

A barrel is a cylindrical container, traditionally made with wooden material.

Barrel may also refer to:

- BARREL (Balloon Array for RBSP Relativistic Electron Losses), a NASA mission
- Barrel (album), a 1970 album by Lee Michaels
- Barrel (horology), a watch component
- Barrel (unit), several units of volume
- Barrel (wine), for fermenting or ageing wine
- Barrel (fastener), a simple hinge consisting of a barrel and a pivot
- Gun barrel
- the venturi of a carburetor
- a component of a clarinet
- a component of a snorkel
- a tank in Harry Turtledove's books; see Victoria: An Empire Under the Sun
- the outside of a low voltage DC connector
- "The Barrel", a song by Aldous Harding from her 2019 album Designer

== See also ==
- Barrel roll (disambiguation)
- Barrell, a surname
- Barrow (disambiguation)
- Beryl (disambiguation)
- Keg
