= John Clarke (satirist) =

New Zealand comedian, writer, and satirist (1948–2017)

- Born: John Morrison Clarke; 29 July 1948; Palmerston North, New Zealand
- Died: 9 April 2017 (aged 68); Dunkeld, Victoria, Australia
- Occupations: Satirist; writer; actor; comedian
- Years active: 1972–2017
- Website: mrjohnclarke.com

John Morrison Clarke (29 July 1948 – 9 April 2017) was a New Zealand comedian, writer and satirist who lived and worked in New Zealand & Australia in the 1970s. He was a highly regarded actor and writer whose work appeared on the Australian Broadcasting Corporation (ABC) in both radio and television and also in print. He is principally known for his character Fred Dagg and his long-running collaboration with fellow satirist Bryan Dawe, which lasted from 1989 to his death in 2017, as well as for his success as a comic actor in Australian and New Zealand film and television.

== Early life and career ==
Clarke was born on 29 July 1948 in Palmerston North, New Zealand, the son of Ted Clarke and Neva Clarke-McKenna. He moved to Wellington and attended Scots College before studying at Victoria University of Wellington between 1967 and 1970.

Clarke first became known during the mid to late 1970s for portraying a laconic farmer called Fred Dagg on stage, film and television. Gumboot and singlet-clad, Dagg had seven sons all named "Trev". Clarke also recorded a series of records and cassettes and published several books as Dagg. Over forty years after its release, the first Fred Dagg album, Fred Dagg's Greatest Hits (1976), remains one of New Zealand's biggest selling records. Some of his earliest appearances as Fred Dagg in the Australian media were on the ABC's The Science Show and Dagg later made regular radio appearances on 2JJ until the station moved to FM and was renamed 2JJJ in 1980. An LP of some 2JJ sketches, The Fred Dagg Tapes, was released in 1979. He relocated to Australia in 1977.

In 1984 Clarke was part of the Australian ABC TV series The Gillies Report, starring Max Gillies. Among the highlights of this satire were Clarke's straight-faced reports on the fictional sport of "farnarkeling" and the exploits of Australia's farnarkeling champion, Dave Sorensen.

In 1998, together with others, Clarke developed the TV series The Games, a satirical series depicting the preparations for the Sydney 2000 Olympic Games.

== Films ==
In 1972, he made his first film appearance in The Adventures of Barry McKenzie, a film about an expatriate Australian in London. Although Clarke was only an extra, the film's makers, Bruce Beresford and Barry Humphries, instantly recognised his talent; "he was terribly funny and terribly real". In 1974 he wrote and appeared (as Ken) in Buck House, a New Zealand comedy TV series set in a student flat.

In 1982, he was nominated for an AFI award for co-writing the acclaimed Paul Cox film Lonely Hearts. He also co-wrote the mini-series Anzacs and provided the voice of Wal Footrot in the feature-length animated film, Footrot Flats: The Dog's Tale (1986), based on the comic strips by Murray Ball. Towards the end of the 1980s, he featured in a number of other films, and began to be known for his political satire.

During the 1980s and early 1990s, Clarke featured in several films, including Never Say Die, alongside New Zealand actor Temuera Morrison, Death in Brunswick, alongside another New Zealand actor, Sam Neill, and Blood Oath (released in some countries as Prisoners of the Sun).

== Mock interviews ==
In 1987 or 1989 Clarke and collaborator Bryan Dawe introduced weekly satirical mock interviews to television, and these short pieces became a regular and popular segment of the Nine Network current affairs programme A Current Affair. These are described by Robert Phiddian & Jessica Milner as John Clarke's "most sustained comic attack on public mendacity."

Each segment addressed a topical issue, with Dawe acting as the interviewer, while Clarke assumed the persona of a politician or other figure, who typically tries to avoid directly answering any of Dawe's questions. Unusually for the genre, Clarke never attempted to directly mimic the voice, manner or appearance of his subject. This feature set the segments apart from the typical approach to this form of satire, including Clarke's earlier series The Gillies Report (1985–86).

The pair continued to do mock interviews for A Current Affair until 1997, satirising a range of figures including Paul Keating, Alexander Downer, George Bush, and Alan Bond. After a break, the pair reappeared on ABC TV's The 7.30 Report in a similar format. In 2013 the mock interviews became an eponymous program, Clarke and Dawe, which screened on ABC TV. The interviews were broadcast weekly on ABCTV and were made available online on both the ABC and on YouTube and for retail sale. This format of mock interviews was continued by John Bird and John Fortune on the British TV show Bremner, Bird and Fortune from 1999 onwards.

The interviews have been compiled into books and CD releases. Great Interviews of the Twentieth Century won the ARIA Award for Best Australian Comedy Album in 1991. The Annual Report won the same award in 1992 and Secret Men's Business was nominated in 1997.

== Later career ==
Clarke had a commercial success in 1998, when he co-wrote (with Ross Stevenson) and starred (with Dawe and Gina Riley) in The Games, a mockumentary about the Sydney Organising Committee for the Olympic Games (SOCOG). In 2001, Billy Connolly starred in a film based on Clarke's screenplay The Man Who Sued God (re-written by Don Watson). In 2002 Clarke appeared in a villainous role in the movie Crackerjack and as a comedy club owner in the award-winning telemovie Roy Hollsdotter Live. After a quiet period, he re-emerged in 2004, adapting Melbourne author Shane Maloney's Murray Whelan series for film. This resulted in two films, Stiff and The Brush-Off, both starring David Wenham and Mick Molloy. Clarke directed Stiff himself and made a cameo appearance in The Brush-Off, which was directed by his old friend Sam Neill.

Clarke was the author of several books, notably two mock compilations of Australian poetry, and The Tournament, a book describing a fictional tennis tournament involving many philosophical and literary figures of the twentieth century.

During the 1980s, Clarke was an influential Board member of Film Victoria.

In 2004 he was the recipient of the Byron Kennedy Award, "for his works of sustained excellence and for the inspiration he presents to all of us in his roles as poet, playwright, actor, author, director and producer."

Clarke was patron of the Australian Poetry Centre, launched in June 2007, one of the forerunners of the national peak body for poets, Australian Poetry.

He was inducted into the Logies Hall of Fame in 2008. The Logie was presented to him by long-time collaborator and friend Bryan Dawe. At the ARIA Music Awards of 2017 his posthumous album, Clarke's Classics, won the award for Best Comedy Release in October of that year.

== Death and legacy ==
On 9 April 2017, Clarke died of a heart attack while on a bushwalk up Mount Abrupt in the Grampians National Park, Victoria. Australian prime minister Malcolm Turnbull, leader of the opposition Bill Shorten, and New Zealand prime minister Bill English paid tribute to his role as a political satirist. Turnbull said "His satire served a noble purpose. It spoke truth to power. It made our democracy richer and stronger. It kept politicians on their toes".

Long-time collaborator Bryan Dawe said in an interview with Tony Wright of the Sydney Morning Herald, "He'd never forget what was going on in your life", and paid tribute to their partnership; "The trick with John was he had these sparkling eyes. He was a mischief maker and his eyes went looking for mischief. You could see it and it would set you off. Neither of us could look at each other when we were doing the show... It was always about the audience". Episodes of Clarke & Dawe were re-released online and interviews with the pair were repeated on ABC Radio in the wake of Clarke's death.

Clarke's work was presented on ABC Radio and Television over a period of nearly 30 years. In tribute to him and his work, the ABC repeated many pieces after his death, including his guest presentation for ABC Classic FM from October 2016 and the three-part documentary Sporting Nation, repeated on ABC television. ABC Television also screened a program containing tributes from Dawe and other friends, politicians, colleagues and comedians entitled John Clarke: Thanks for Your Time. Comedian and fellow New Zealander Tony Martin delivered a tribute to Clarke at the 2017 Logie Awards.

Clarke and his works are the subject of an academic study in the journal Comedy Studies. The study was written and compiled by New Zealand film producer and writer Paul Horan in collaboration with film researcher and archivist Mark Hutchings.

The Fred Award, named after Clarke's character Fred Dagg, is the top award at the New Zealand International Comedy Festival, and has been presented since 2006. The Victorian Premier's Literary Awards added a category in 2024 named the John Clarke Prize for Humour Writing for works of fiction, nonfiction, and poetry.

His daughter Lorin Clarke published the memoir Would that be funny? in 2023. She also directed But Also John Clarke, a feature-length documentary about her father which premiered at the Melbourne International Film Festival in August 2025.

== Filmography ==
- The Adventures of Barry McKenzie (1972) – Expatriate
- Buck House (1974) TV Series – Ken (1975) (also writer)
- The Wonderful World of Fred Dagg (1975) TV Series – Fred Dagg (also writer)
- Fred Dagg Live: A Bit of a Dagg (1976) (TV) – Fred Dagg (also writer)
- Dagg Day Afternoon (1977) – Fred Dagg (also writer/director)
- Wild Man (1977) – Dr. Frederick Z. Daggenheimer
- Lonely Hearts (1982) – Alan (also writer)
- The Gillies Report (1984) TV Series – Various including Farnarkeling Expert (also writer)
- The Fast Lane (1985–1987) – Writer & creator (alongside Andrew Knight)
- Man and Boy (1986) – Man asking directions (also writer/director)
- A Matter of Convenience (1987) (TV) – Joe McGuiness
- Footrot Flats: The Dog's Tale (1986) (voice) – Wal
- Les Patterson Saves the World (1987) – Mike Rooke
- Those Dear Departed (1987) – Insp. Jerry
- Never Say Die (1988) – Car salesman
- A Current Affair – Mock Interviews (1989–1997) (also writer)
- Blood Oath (1990) – Sheedy
- Death in Brunswick (1991) – Dave
- Stark (1993) (TV) – Magistrate
- The Alive Tribe (1997) – Coach Smith
- The Problem With Men (1997) TV Series – Himself (also writer)
- The Games (1998) TV Series – John (1998–2000) (also writer/executive producer)
- Crackerjack (2002) – Bernie Fowler
- Roy Hollsdotter Live (2003) (TV) – Mike
- Stiff (2004) (TV) – (writer/director/producer)
- The Brush-Off (2004) (TV) – Ken Sproule (also writer/producer)
- Kath & Kim (2004) – Paul Collins
- Bro'Town (2006, 2009) (TV) guest
- Snugglepot and Cuddlepie (2007) (Stage Musical) (Script writer/May Gibbs book adaptation)
- A Month of Sundays (2015) – Phillip Lang
- Sporting Nation (2016) – (writer/presenter)
- The Ex-PM (2015–2017) TV Series – Henry

== Books ==
- Fred Dagg's Year (1975)
- The Thoughts of chairman Fred (1976)
- The Fred Dagg Careers Advisory Bureau (1978)
- The Fred Dagg Scripts (1981)
- Daggshead Revisited (1982)
- The Complete Book of Australian Verse (1989)
- A Complete Dagg (1989)
- Great Interviews of the Twentieth Century (1990)
- A Royal Commission into the Australian Economy (1991) (with Ross Stevenson)
- More Great Interviews (1992). St Leonards, N.S.W., Allen and Unwin. ISBN 1-86373-268-3
- The Even More Complete Book of Australian Verse (1994) ISBN 9781921922152
- A Dagg at My Table: Selected Writings (1996)
- Still the Two (1997)
- The Games (1999) (with Ross Stevenson)
- The Games II: Sharing the Blame (2000) (with Ross Stevenson) ISBN 9780733309595
- The Tournament (2002) ISBN 9781921776786
- The Howard Miracle (2003) ISBN 9781877008856
- The 7.56 report (2006) ISBN 9781921776816
- The Catastrophe Continues: Selected Interviews (2008) ISBN 9781921351938
- Tinkering: The Complete Book of John Clarke (2017) ISBN 9781925603194

== Discography ==
=== Studio and live albums ===
List of albums with Australian chart positions
| Title | Album details | Peak chart positions |
| Title | Album details | AUS |
|---|---|---|
Credited as Fred Dagg
| Fred Dagg's Greatest Hits | Released: 1975; Label: EMI (DAGG 1); Format: LP, Cassette | – |
| Fred Dagg Live | Released: 1976; Label: EMI (DAGG 3); Format: LP, Cassette | – |
| The Fred Dagg Tapes | Released: 1979; Label: EMI (EMC 159); Format: LP, CD | 36 |
Credited as John Clarke
| Swim Between the Flags | Released: 1987; Label: Festival (L38874); Format: LP, CD | – |
| Great Interviews of the Twentieth Century (with Bryan Dawe) | Released: 1990; Label: WEA (903172769-2); Format: LP, CD, Cassette | 49 |
| The Annual Report (with Bryan Dawe) | Released: 1991; Label: WEA (903175998-2); Format: CD, Cassette | 94 |
| Secret Men's Business (with Bryan Dawe) | Released: 1996; Label: Columbia (487108-2); Format: CD | – |
| The Even More Complete Book of Australian Verse | Released: 2003; Label: Text Publishing (920885 013); Format: CD | – |
| Clarke's Classics | Released: 11 August 2017; Label: ABC Music; Format: 3x CD, DD | – |

=== Compilation albums ===
List of compilation
| Title | Album details | Peak chart positions | Certifications |
| Title | Album details | NZ | Certifications |
|---|---|---|---|
| Fred Dagg Anthology | Released: 1998; Label: Columbia (489885-2); Format: CD, Cassette | 2 | RMNZ: Gold |
| The Taihape Years | Released: August 2008; Label: Jigsaw; Format: CD, DD | 34 | |

== Awards ==
=== ARIA Music Awards ===
The ARIA Music Awards is an annual awards ceremony that recognises excellence, innovation, and achievement across all genres of Australian music. John Clarke has won three awards from four nominations.

| Year | Nominee / work | Award | Result |
|---|---|---|---|
| 1991 | Great Interviews of the 20th Century (with Bryan Dawe) | Best Comedy Release | Won |
| 1992 | The Annual Report (with Bryan Dawe) | Best Comedy Release | Won |
| 1997 | Secret Men's Business (with Bryan Dawe) | Best Comedy Release | Nominated |
| 2017 | Clarke's Classics | Best Comedy Release | Won |
