= Moynihan (TV series) =

- Starring: Ian Mune; Louise Pajo; Walter Brown; Peter Gwynne; Edward Howell; Ray Barrett; Stratford Johns
- Countries of origin: New Zealand, Australia

Production
- Running time: 60 minutes

Original release
- Network: TV One, ABC
- Release: 24 February 1976 – 1977

Moynihan is a New Zealand-Australian television drama series. The series revolves around the professional and personal life of Leo Moynihan, the tough-talking secretary of the Central Carpenters Union.

== Cast ==
- Ian Mune as Leon Moynihan
- Louise Pajo as Amy
- Walter Brown as Jack Shaw
- Peter Gwynne as Minister
- Edward Howell
- Sheila Hammond as Sarah Kemp
- Ray Barrett
- Stratford Johns
- Cecily Polson
- Julia Blake as Tanya Shaw
- Ken Blackburn as Brian Crosby
- Judie Douglass as Jeanet Moynihan
