= Louise Pajo =

New Zealand actress (1940–2020)

- Louise Pajo at age 28, playing Gia Kelly in the Doctor Who serial The Seeds of Death (1969)
- Born: Louise Elizabeth Pajo; 31 July 1940; Hastings, New Zealand
- Died: 23 November 2020 (aged 80); New South Wales, Australia
- Occupation: Actress
- Years active: 1965-1999

Louise Elizabeth Pajo (31 July 1940 – 23 November 2020) also credited as Louise R. Pajo, Louise Pago and Teresa Pajo. was a New Zealand-born television and film actress, who worked in productions in her native country, but also in Britain and Australia, starting from 1965 until 1999.

== Biography ==
Born in Hastings, New Zealand of Estonian descent; she trained in RADA in the United Kingdom. After graduating in 1966 she went on to appear in many popular British television programmes, including The Avengers and Doctor Who in The Seeds of Death.

Her British films included Jane Eyre (1970), Sex and the Other Woman (1972) and On the Game (1974).

She subsequently emigrated to Australia in the late 1970s where she continued her acting career, appearing in films such as Dawn! in 1979, Far East and Norman Loves Rose in 1982.

In 1977, Pajo joined the cast of Cop Shop as Don McKenna's wife, Carol. Other notable roles include the three episode guest role of Helen Masters in Prisoner in 1979. This was followed by the regular role of the snobbish Margery Carson in Carson's Law for its entire two-year run, airing from January 1983 to December 1984. Other Australian series she has featured include roles in The Flying Doctors, Brides of Christ, A Country Practice and Home and Away. Her last known on screen role was in Big Sky in 1999, and she retired from acting in 2000 at age 60.

During her retirement, Pajo would occasionally appear at Doctor Who signings and question and answer events. Two of her most recent appearances at such events were at the "Fantom Autumn Signing Spectacular" in Chiswick on 21 October 2017, and at the Fantom Films Galaxy 4 event in Sheffield on 28 October 2017.

Louise Pajo died on 23 November 2020, aged 80.

== Filmography ==
FILM

Year	Title	Role	Type
1972	Sex and the Other Woman	Shirley	Feature film, UK
1974	On the Game	Veronica France (as Louise Pago)	Feature film, UK
1979	Dawn!	Woman Reporter	Feature film
1979	Tim	Secretary	Feature film
1982	Far East	Shirley	Feature film
1982	Norman Loves Rose	Shirley	Feature film

TELEVISION

Year	Title	Role	Type
1965	Romeo and Juliet	Flower Girl / Nun / Page	TV film, UK
1967	Love Story	Guest role: The Girl	TV series UK, 1 episode
1967	The Revenue Men	Guest role: Carol Harper	TV series UK, 1 episode
1968	Public Eye	Guest role: Angela	TV series UK, 1 episode
1968	ITV Playhouse	Guest role: Laura Parry	TV series UK, 1 episode
1968	Thirty-Minute Theatre	Guest role: Kathleen Kingara	TV series UK, 1 episode
1968	The Tyrant King	Guest role: Girl	TV series UK, 1 episode
1968	The Avengers	Guest role: Miss Craven	TV series UK, 1 episode
1969	Doctor Who	Guest role: Gia Kelly	TV series UK, 6 episodes The Seeds of Death
1969	The Expert	Guest role: Sally	TV series UK, 1 episode
1969	The Gold Robbers	Recurring role: Jenny Bolt	TV miniseries UK, 3 episodes
1969	Strange Report	Guest role: Marla	TV series UK, 1 episode
1969;1970	ITV Saturday Night Theatre	Guest roles: Art Gallery receptionist / June	TV series UK, 2 episodes
1970	UFO	Guest roles: Miss Scott / Nurse	TV series UK, 2 episodes
1970	Jane Eyre	Mary Lugram	TV film, UK/US
1971	Crimes Of Passion	Guest role: Genevieve	TV series UK, 1 episode
1973	Barlow At Large	Guest role: Nurse	TV series UK, 1 episode
1973	General Hospital	Guest role: Margaret-Ann Neyworth	TV series UK, 1 episode (English series not to be confused "General Hospital" US daytime soap)
1973	Spy Trap	Guest role: Deborah Monckton	TV series UK, 1 episode
1976-1977	Moynihan	Regular Lead role: Amy	TV series NZ, 15 episodes
1977	The Governor	Guest role: Christine Balneavis	TV miniseries NZ, 1 episode
1977-1978	Cop Shop	Recurring role: Carol McKenna	TV series, 25 episodes
1978	Run From The Morning	Guest role	ABC TV series, 1 episode
1979	Prisoner	Recurring Guest role: Helen Masters	TV series, 3 episodes
1983-1984	Carson's Law	Regular lead role: Margery Carson	TV series, 184 episodes
1984	The 26th Annual TV Week Logie Awards	Audience member with 'Carson's Law' cast	TV Special
1987	Willing And Abel	Guest role	TV series, 1 episode
1988	The Riddle Of The Stinson	Smyth's Secretary	TV film
1988;1989	The Flying Doctors	Recurring Guest role: Maureen Redmond	TV series, 2 episodes
1991	Brides Of Christ	Recurring role: Jean Markham	ABC TV miniseries, 1 episode
1992	E Street	Guest role: Mrs. O'Brien	TV series, 1 episode
1992	Bony	Guest role: Audrey	TV series, 1 episode
1993	A Country Practice	Recurring Guest role: Gwen Bannister (as Teresa Pajo)	TV series, 2 episodes
1993	Home and Away	Guest role: Thelma	TV series, 1 episode
1995	Spellbinder	Guest role: TV Host	TV series, 1 episode
1999	Big Sky	Guest role: Mrs. Mitchell	TV series, 1 episode
2012	Second Time Around: The Troughton Years	Gia Kelly (archive footage)	Video
