= Barrow Hill =

Barrow Hill may refer to:

- Barrow Hill, Derbyshire
  - home of Barrow Hill Roundhouse engine shed and museum
- Barrow Hill, Dorset
- Barrow Hill, Essex
- Barrow Hill Local Nature Reserve, West Midlands
- Barrow Hill Plantation, cotton plantation in Florida, USA
- Barrow Hill: Curse of the Ancient Circle, video game

== See also ==
- Creech Barrow Hill in Dorset, England
