= Tournament of Champions =

Tournament of Champions may refer to:

== Sports ==
=== Golf ===
- Tournament of Champions (golf), a PGA Tour event
- Tournament of Champs, a 1969 LPGA Tour (women's) tournament
- LPGA Tournament of Champions, an LPGA Tour (women's) tournament

=== Tennis ===
- ATP Champions Tour, an international men's tennis circuit for retired pros
- WTA Tournament of Champions, a women's tennis event for champions of WTA International tournaments
- Tournament of Champions (tennis), a major professional tennis tournament from 1957 to 1959
- Jack Kramer Tournament of Champions, the name of the Wembley Championships in 1968
- WCT Tournament of Champions, a men's tennis tournament that was held on the WCT Tour from 1977 to 1990

=== Other sports ===
- PBA Tournament of Champions, one of the four major bowling tournaments on the PBA Tour
- Tournament of Champions (NJSIAA), a high school tournament in New Jersey to determine overall #1 state ranking for each sport
- Tournament of Champions (squash), an international squash tournament held in New York City

== Television ==
- Jeopardy! Tournament of Champions, a tournament of past major winners in the game show Jeopardy!
- Tournament of Champions (TV series), a Food Network competition series hosted by Guy Fieri

== Other uses ==
- World Series of Poker Tournament of Champions, a World Series of Poker invitational tournament
  - World Series of Poker: Tournament of Champions, a 2006 tie-in video game based on the tournament
- Tournament of Champions (debate), a United States high school debate tournament
- Escape Room: Tournament of Champions, an American horror film

== See also ==
- Tournament (disambiguation)
- Champion (disambiguation)
