= Clarke's Classics =

Studio album by John Clarke
- Released: 11 August 2017
- Label: ABC Classics

John Clarke chronology
The Taihape Years (2008)	Clarke's Classics (2017)

Clarke's Classics is a comedy studio album by Australian satirist John Clarke, in collaboration with producer Kat McGuffie. The album was released in August 2017.

At the ARIA Music Awards of 2017 the album won the ARIA Award for Best Comedy Release, this is Clarke's third time winning this award.

== Background and release ==
In October 2016, John Clarke made his debut appearance as guest presenter on ABC Classic FM's Saturday Morning program. Clarke relished the opportunity to turn his comic genius and brilliant wit to music he adored: orchestral favourites by Vaughan Williams and Dvořák, piano classics by Liszt, Satie and Beethoven, and iconic opera moments such as "'O Mio Babbino Caro".

John Clarke died in April 2017. When the first show was re-aired on Classic FM as a tribute, the audience response was again extraordinary, and the ABC was inundated with requests for an album release of the program. Thanks to this public outpouring, and to the enthusiasm of the Clarke family, the full program is presented here as a tribute to Clarke's commentary.

== Track listing ==
CD1

1. Listz – "Hungarian Rhapsody No. 2"
2. Bizet Carmen – "Habanera"
3. Satie – "Gymnopédie No. 1"
4. Gluck – "What is Life?"
5. Vaugh Williams – "The Lark Ascending"
6. Beethoven – "Moonlight Sonata: First movement"
7. Bizet – "The Pearl Fishers: Duet"
8. Schubert – "Hungarian Melody"

CD2

1. Hill – "Trumpet Concerto"
2. Puccini – "O Mio Babbino Caro"
3. Bach – "Goldberg Variations: Aria"
4. Verdi "Va, Pensiero"
5. Dvořák – "New World Symphony"

CD3

1. Schubert – "Ave Maria"
2. Wagner – "Siegfried Idyll"
3. Delibes Lakmé – "Flower Duet"
4. Brahms – "Hungarian Dance No. 5"
5. Widor – "Toccata"

== Release history ==
Region	Date	Format	Label	Catalogue
Australia	11 August 2017	digital download; 3x CD	ABC Classics	4828548
