= Barrow (name) =

Barrow is an English surname. Notable people with the surname include:

- Adama Barrow (born 1965), Gambian President
- Al Barrow (born 1968), English musician
- Anibal Barrow (1948–2013), Honduran journalist
- Bernard Barrow (1927–1993), American actor
- Claire Barrow, English artist
- Clyde Barrow (1909–1934), American gangster, part of the Bonnie and Clyde crime duo
- Dean Barrow (born 1951), Belizean politician
- Ed Barrow (1868–1953), baseball executive
- Errol Barrow (1920–1987), Barbados founding prime minister
- Frances Elizabeth Barrow (1822–1894), American children's writer
- Geoff Barrow (born 1971), English musician
- Geoffrey Wallis Steuart Barrow (1924–2013), Scottish historian
- George Barrow (geologist) (1853–1932), British geologist
- George Barrow (musician) (1921–2013), American jazz saxophonist
- George L. Barrow (1851–1925), Australian journalist, son of John H. Barrow
- Henry Barrowe (c. 1550–1593), 16th-century English Puritan and separatist
- Irvine Barrow (1913–2005), Canadian politician
- Isaac Barrow (1630–1677), English divine, scholar and mathematician
- Isaac Barrow (bishop) (1613–1680), Bishop of Sodor and Man and of St Asaph; Governor of the Isle of Man
- Jill Barrow (born 1951), British businesswoman
- Jocelyn Barrow (1929–2020), British educator, community activist and politician
- Sir John Barrow, 1st Baronet (1764–1848), English statesman
- John Barrow (U.S. politician) (born 1955), Representative for Georgia's 12th congressional district
- John D. Barrow (1952–2020), English theoretical physicist
- John Henry Barrow (1817–1874), Congregational minister, journalist and South Australian politician
- Joseph Louis Barrow (1914–1981), American boxer and heavyweight champion better known as "Joe Louis"
- Kelvin Barrow (died 2000), Belizean drowning victim
- Malcolm Palliser Barrow (1900–1973), Federation of Rhodesia and Nyasaland politician
- Middleton P. Barrow (1839–1903), Senator from Georgia
- Modou Barrow (born 1992), Gambian professional footballer
- Moses Michael Levi Barrow (born Jamal Michael Barrow; 1978), better known by his stage name Shyne, Belizean rapper and politician
- Musa Barrow (born 1998), Gambian professional footballer
- Nita Barrow (1916–1995), Governor-General of Barbados
- Rebecca Barrow, British young adult author
- Robert H. Barrow (1922–2008), American general, 27th Commandant of the US Marine Corps
- Robert Ruffin Barrow (1798–1875), American sugar planter and slave owner
- Rosemary Barrow (1968–2016), British art historian
- Simeon Barrow (born 2002), American football player
- Steve Barrow (1945–2026), British reggae producer and historiographer
- Steve Barrow (rugby league) (born 1975), English rugby league player
- Timothy A. Barrow (1934–2019), American politician
- Tim Barrow (born 1964), British diplomat
- Thomas Barrow (Jesuit) (1747–1813), British Jesuit
- Thomas Barrow (politician) (1916–1982), politician in Manitoba, Canada
- Tony Barrow (1936–2016), English public relations man for The Beatles
- The Bravado Brothers, American professional wrestling tag team consisting of Clint Barrow (born 1989) and Houston Barrow (born 1985)

As an artist name:

- Typh Barrow (born 1987), Belgian singer-songwriter

== See also ==
- Barrows (surname)
