= The Annual Report =

Studio album by John Clarke and Bryan Dawe
- Released: November 1991
- Label: Mana Music / EastWest

John Clarke and Bryan Dawe chronology
Great Interviews of the Twentieth Century (1990)	The Annual Report (1991)	Secret Men's Business (1996)

The Annual Report is a second comedy studio album by New Zealand satirist John Clarke and Australian Bryan Dawe. The album was released in November 1991 and peaked at number 94 on The Australian ARIA Charts. The interviews first broadcast on A Current Affair on the Nine Network.

At the ARIA Music Awards of 1992 the album won the ARIA Award for Best Comedy Release; the duo's second consecutive win in this category.

== Track listing ==
1. "Religious Instruction" - The Hon. Bob Hawke, Prime Minister
2. "A Working Class Boy" - The Hon. John Hewson, Leader of the Australian Liberal Party
3. "The Banking Inquiry" - The Hon. Paul Keating, Federal Treasurer
4. "Attracting the Green Vote" - The Hon. Bob Hawke, Prime Minister
5. "Trouble with Stamps" - The Hon. Charles Blunt, Leader of the National Party
6. "On the Vital Matter Of Trade - The Hon. Bob Hawke, Prime Minister
7. "The Crossword" - The Hon. Paul Keating, Federal Treasurer
8. "Protecting the Environment" - A BHP Spokesman
9. "Our Man in Dublin" - Mr. Brian Burke, Ex-Western Australian Premier, Ambassador to Eire
10. "Our Man in Perth" - Mr. Brian Burke, Ex-Western Australian Premier, Ex-Ambassador to Eire
11. "Our Man in Wonderland" - Mr. Brian Burke, Ex-Western Australian Premier, Semi-retired Witness
12. "On the Waterfront" - The Hon. John Hewson, Leader of the Australian Liberal Party
13. "A Couple of Bucks" - The Hon. Paul Keating, Federal Treasurer
14. "The Challenge" - The Hon. Bob Hawke, Prime Minister And The Hon. Paul Keating, Recently Demobbed Federal Treasurer
15. "A Very Brilliant Man" - The Hon. Jeff Kennett, Victorian Opposition Leader
16. "A Standing Ovation" - The Hon. Bob Hawke, Prime Minister
17. "Defending the Faith" - The Hon. John Kerin, Recently Appointed Federal Treasurer
18. "The Front Fell Off" - Senator Bob Collins, Minister For Shipping
19. "Consumption Tax" - The Hon. John Hewson, Leader of the Australian Liberal Party
20. "I'd Rather Not Discuss It" - The Hon. Paul Keating. Previously Federal Treasurer
21. "The Big Question" - The Hon. John Hewson, Leader of the Australian Liberal Party
22. "A Message from Spain" - Mr. Christopher Skase, Ornament to Australian Business

== Charts ==
Chart (1991/92)	Peak position
Australian (ARIA Chart)	94

== Release history ==
Region	Date	Format	Label	Catalogue
Australia	November 1991	LP; Cassette; CD	Mana Music /EastWest	9031759982
