= The Brush-Off =

Book by Shane Maloney

- First edition
- Author: Shane Maloney
- Language: English
- Series: Murray Whelan
- Genre: Crime, Comedy, Political novel
- Publisher: Text Publishing
- Publication date: 1996
- Publication place: Australia
- Media type: Print (Paperback)
- Pages: 314 pp
- ISBN: 1-875847-14-6
- OCLC: 35630734
- Preceded by: Stiff
- Followed by: Nice Try

The Brush-Off is a 1996 Australian crime thriller novel, written by Shane Maloney. It is the second novel in a series of crime thrillers following the character of Murray Whelan, as he investigates crimes in the Melbourne area in the course of trying to keep his job with the Australian Labor Party.

The novel was a co-winner for the Crime Writing, Best Australian Crime Novel Award at the Ned Kelly Awards in 1997. It has been translated into German (2000), Japanese (2002) and French (2004).

== Film adaptation ==
In 2004, The Brush-Off was adapted into a television movie by Huntaway Films and the Seven Network as part of The Murray Whelan Series. The screenplay was written by John Clarke and directed by Sam Neill. David Wenham was cast as Murray Whelan (reprising his role from the previous film Stiff), with a supporting cast that included Mick Molloy, Deborah Kennedy and Steve Bisley.

=== Cast ===
- David Wenham as Murray Whelan
- Mick Molloy as Angel Angelli
- Deborah Kennedy as Trish
- Steve Bisley as Lloyd Eastlake
- Justine Clarke as Salina
- Leah Vandenberg as Claire Sutton
- Andrew S. Gilbert as Duncan Keogh
- Heather Mitchell as Fiona Lambert
- Bruce Spence as Philip Veale
- Robyn Butler as Wendy Whelan
- Alex Menglet as Max Katyn
- Joel Tobeck as Spider
- Tracy Mann as Faye Curnow
- Robert Grubb as Det Sgt Constable Micaelis
- Gerard Kennedy as Bob
- Tony Nikolakopoulos as Mavramoustakides
- Alexander Cappelli as Youth
