= Van Helsing: The London Assignment =

2004 American animated short film

- DVD cover
- Directed by: Sharon Bridgeman
- Written by: Judith and Garfield Reeves-Stevens
- Based on: Dracula by Bram Stoker
- Produced by: John Kafka
- Starring: Hugh Jackman; Tress MacNeille; Tara Strong; Robbie Coltrane; David Wenham; Dwight Schultz
- Edited by: Ken Solomon
- Music by: John Van Tongeren
- Production companies: Universal Cartoon Studios; Production I.G; Sunwoo Entertainment
- Distributed by: Universal Studios Home Video
- Release dates: April 17, 2004 (Amsterdam Fantastic Film Festival); May 11, 2004 (United States)
- Running time: 33 minutes
- Country: United States
- Language: English

Van Helsing: The London Assignment is a 2004 American anime-influenced adult action horror animated short film distributed by Universal Studios Home Video and animated by Universal Cartoon Studios, Production I.G, and Sunwoo Entertainment.

An animated prequel to the 2004 motion picture Van Helsing (released in the same year), it features the voices of Hugh Jackman, Tress MacNeille, Robbie Coltrane and David Wenham, with the former and latter, along with Alun Armstrong, reprising their roles from the film as Gabriel Van Helsing, Friar Carl, and Cardinal Jinette respectively.

The short film received mostly positive reviews, with some noting it to be a significant improvement to that of the original film.

== Plot ==
Monster hunter Gabriel Van Helsing and friar Carl travel to London to investigate a series of horrific, and decidedly supernatural murders, being committed by the mad scientist Dr. Jekyll, in the form of his evil alter-ego, Mr. Hyde. When tracing Hyde to his underground fortress, Van Helsing and Carl find a young woman who claims to be Queen Victoria, and they discover that Dr. Jekyll is in love with the Queen. In order to keep her young and thus immortal, she has been given a potion by Dr. Jekyll that turns her into a young woman for one night. In order to create the potion which causes the transformations, Dr. Jekyll needs the drained souls of his freshly killed victims and thus the killings will never stop.

Dr. Jekyll then kidnaps Victoria, using the Golden Jubilee Balloon to escape. Van Helsing uses his grappling gun to follow the balloon, then proceeds to board it. In the balloon, Dr. Jekyll becomes Mr. Hyde to kill Van Helsing and crashes the balloon in the process. While fighting on the in-construction Tower Bridge, Mr. Hyde is shot through the arm but manages to escape. Upon returning Victoria to Buckingham Palace, Van Helsing says that daybreak will break the enchantment, returning her to her real age.

To reward him, Victoria kisses him, at the precise moment of daybreak, causing her old self, completely unaware of what happened, to slap him and call for guards, forcing him and Carl to flee. Van Helsing sends word back to Vatican City about what has happened while he tracks Jekyll to Paris.

== Voice cast ==
- Hugh Jackman as Gabriel Van Helsing
- Tress MacNeille as Queen Victoria
  - Tara Strong as Young Victoria
- Dwight Schultz as Dr. Henry Jekyll / Jack the Ripper
  - Robbie Coltrane as Mr. Edward Hyde / Jack the Ripper
- David Wenham as Friar Carl
- Grey DeLisle as the First Victim
- Tress MacNeille as the Second Victim
- John DiMaggio as Coachman
- Scott Mosenson as Palace Guard
- Alun Armstrong as Cardinal Jinette
- Roger Jackson as Drunken Gentleman
- Julia Fletcher as Lady-in-Waiting
