= Angel Mine =

1978 New Zealand fantasy fiction film

- Directed by: David Blyth
- Written by: David Blyth
- Produced by: Warren Sellers; David Blyth
- Starring: Derek Ward; Jennifer Redford; Myra De Groot
- Cinematography: John Earnshaw
- Edited by: Philip Howe
- Music by: Mark Nicholas; Suburban Reptiles
- Production companies: ILA Films; New Zealand Film Commission
- Distributed by: ILA Films; Valhalla Films
- Release date: 1978
- Running time: 68 minutes
- Country: New Zealand
- Language: English

For the Cowboy Junkies song, see Lay It Down (Cowboy Junkies album).

Angel Mine is a 1978 New Zealand fantasy fiction film.

== Synopsis ==
Angel Mine is advertised as a drug for automatically solving marital problems. A young Auckland middle class suburban couple become entangled in this surrealistic world switching between reality and fantasy while attempting to model their lives on media advertising in a world of black leather and punk music.

== Cast ==
- Derek Ward as The Man
- Jennifer Redford as The Woman
- Myra De Groot as Nun
- Michael Wilson

== Reviews ==
- 1978 The Press "Caution: viewing may be damaging".
- 1994 Cinema Papers New Zealand Supplement.
- 2001 Festival/Awards: NZ Drifting Clouds Film Festival.
