= Stiff (novel) =

1994 Crime novel by Australian writer Shane Maloney

- First edition
- Author: Shane Maloney
- Language: English
- Series: Murray Whelan
- Genre: Crime, Comedy, Political novel
- Publisher: Text Publishing
- Publication date: 1994
- Publication place: Australia
- Media type: Print (Paperback)
- Pages: 217 pp
- ISBN: 1-875847-00-6
- OCLC: 37096614
- Followed by: The Brush-Off

Stiff is a 1994 Australian crime thriller novel, written by Shane Maloney. It is the first novel in a series of crime thrillers following the character of Murray Whelan, as he investigates crimes in the Melbourne area in the course of trying to keep his job with the Australian Labor Party.

== Synopsis ==
In the mid-1980s Murray Whelan is working as the electoral officer in the office of Victorian State MP Charlene Wills, who is also the state's Minister for Industry. His job is to look after Wills's electoral constituents, those "ordinary voters desperately seeking redress from bureaucratic inanity or government indifference." In the meantime he and his wife were over in "everything but name", as she works as an independent contractor in Canberra advising in the Federal Government’s Office of the Status of Women. Their young son Redmond is still in the family home but Whelan thinks that may only be the case for the short-term future.

On the political front there are rumours that a local councillor, with affiliations with the Meat Packers Union, is looking to challenge Wills for her seat in Parliament. When the body of Ekrem Bayraktar is found in a freezer at Pacific Pastoral meat packing works at Coolaroo in Melbourne's outer north, Wills's ministerial advisor, Angelo Agnelli, sees a possible problem arising for Wills and orders Whelan to go out and investigate. The police have already deemed it a death by misadventure – he appears to have had a heart attack and then froze solid among the meat stacks – but Agnelli is worried about appearances more than the truth. Whelan knows next to nothing about investigating situations of this sort and just attempts to muddle through by checking the personnel records and working arrangements of the union members. It all seems in order until he asks a Turkish friend about some of the names on his list, most of which appear to be fictitious or the Turkish equivalent of Mickey Mouse or Frank Sinatra. And then things start to unravel as it becomes clear that someone is running a small but lucrative fiddle of the employment records at the packing plant, that Bayraktar may have been a member of a Turkish para-military group, and someone seems to be trying to kill Whelan.

== Publication history ==
After its initial publication in 1994 by Text Publishing the novel was reprinted as follows:

- Arcade Publishing, USA, 1999, 2014
- Text, Australia, 2000, 2003, 2004, 2012 (with an introduction by Lindsay Tanner)
- Canongate, UK, 2005
- The novel was also translated into French in 2002 and German in 2003.

== Film adaptation ==
In 2004, Stiff was adapted into a television movie by Huntaway Films and the Seven Network as part of The Murray Whelan Series. The screenplay was written by John Clarke, who also directed the movie. David Wenham was cast as Murray Whelan, with a supporting cast that included Mick Molloy and Sam Neill. The film was the highest-rating Sunday evening film on the Seven Network in 2004.
