= Norman Loves Rose =

- Directed by: Henri Safran
- Written by: Henri Safran
- Produced by: Henri Safran
- Starring: Carol Kane; Tony Owen; Myra De Groot; David Downer; Barry Otto; Warren Mitchell; Virginia Hey; Louise Pajo
- Cinematography: Vince Monton
- Music by: Mike Perjanik
- Production company: Norman Films
- Distributed by: Greater Union
- Release date: 17 September 1982
- Running time: 98 minutes
- Country: Australia
- Language: English
- Budget: A$1.3 million

Norman Loves Rose is a 1982 Australian comedy film about a teenage boy who begins a relationship with an adult woman. It was written and directed by Henri Safran as the follow-up to 1976's Storm Boy.

== Plot summary ==
Norman is a 13-year-old Jewish boy living in the eastern suburbs of Sydney. His brother Michael is married to a woman named Rose, who he has failed to impregnate due to a low sperm count. Meanwhile, Michael's colleague Charles has recently left his ex-wife, Maureen, to date a younger model. Norman develops an infatuation with Rose which she encourages, taking him on dates, sharing a bed with him and developing a relationship. Rose eventually does become pregnant and the film heavily implies that Norman is the father. She tells him that they must keep their "little secret." As she gains weight during pregnancy, Norman loses interest in her anyway and begins pursuing Maureen instead.

== Cast ==
- Carol Kane as Rose
- Tony Owen as Norman
- Myra De Groot as Mother
- David Downer as Michael
- Barry Otto as Charles
- Sandy Gore as Maureen
- Warren Mitchell as Morris
- Louise Pajo as Shirley
- Johnny Lockwood as Sam

== Reception ==
Sandra Hall in The Bulletin said, "the comedy relies on a certain amount of obtuseness, literal mindedness, double-takes and talking at cross-purposes. The characters are there to be laughed at, not with, and to that end much over-acting is done. Nobody turns out to be particularly likeable." Susie Eisehuth wrote in The Sydney Morning Herald that the film was "a pleasant little comedy" although the subject matter of a wife needing a child to be fulfilled felt "ideologically on the nose". Anna-Maria Del'Osso, also in the Herald, called the film "an overblown guffaw at sex Jewish Family Style, scripted with the wit of the schoolyard and the tedium of several TV afternoons' worth of situation comedy." David Stratton said it was "padded out with overlong scenes of marginal interest" and compared it to the 1972 Israeli film I Love You Rosa.

Bill Cosford of the Miami Herald called the film "another in the wave of boy-meets-older-girl stories now choking the market", comparing it to Private Lessons. He added:

What is remarkable about these films is how they remind us of the lingering inequity in contemporary gender relations. A lot of people seem to be entertained by little-boy/big-girl, and everyone at least seems to find the idea humorous. Switch the roles, however - little-girl/big-boy - and folks start talking jail time. It's interesting. Norman Loves Rose does nothing to settle such philosophical issues, nor does it do much of anything else, including entertain.
