= Barrow Island =

Island or Barrow Islands may refer to-

- Barrow Island, an island located in Western Australia
- N. and S. Barrow Islands, a pair of islands located in Queensland, Australia
- Barrow Island, a former island in Barrow-in-Furness, England
- Vanavana, an atoll in the Tuamotu Archipelago of French Polynesia
