= Buck House (TV series) =

New Zealand television series

- Written by: Roger Hall; Richard Davis; John Maynard; Eddie Hegan; Ian Mune; Patrick Leighton; Dean Parker; Joe Musaphia; John Banas (additional material); John Clarke (additional material)
- Directed by: Terry Bryan; John Charles; Bill Cole; John Whilwell
- Country of origin: New Zealand
- Original language: English
- No. of seasons: 2
- No. of episodes: 14

Production
- Producers: Douglass Drury; Brian H. Easte
- Running time: 30 minutes

Original release
- Release: April 3, 1974 – February 26, 1975

Buck House is a New Zealand comedy television series that began in 1974. It was set in a home which had mixed flatting. The first season had Myra De Groot as a landlady with three university students, played by Tony Barry, Paul Holmes and Jacqui Dunn. Season 2 aired in 1975 and saw De Groot return with new lodgers with cast members John Banas, John Clarke, Cathy Downes and John Gray.

== Cast ==
- Myra De Groot as Mrs Platt
- Tony Barry as Joe Donovan (season 1)
- Paul Holmes as Reg Willis (season 1)
- Jacqui Dunn as Jo Carr (season 1)
- John Banas as Hugh (season 2)
- John Clarke as Ken (season 2)
- Cathy Downes as Kathy (season 2)
- John Gray as Doug (season 2)

== Episodes ==
1. Flat Broke
2. What a Common Market!
3. More Things in Heaven and Earth
4. Earn While You Learn
5. A.C.T.I.O.N.
6. Escorts Unlimited Ltd
1. Episode 1
2. Episode 2
3. Episode 3
4. Episode 4
5. Episode 5
6. Episode 6
7. Episode 7
8. Episode 8

== Reception ==
After the opening episode the Press said "It was not uproariously funny. Nor was it flat. Now and then the efforts to raise a laugh seemed a little laboured, but there were some acceptable topical allusions, and the thing was carried along cheerfully by a rather unexpectedly confident cast." They wrote of the third episode "Flatting — even better still, mixed flatting - must surely provide more scope for humour than the ignoble daubling with the occult that was the basis of Wednesday's episode." At the end of the season they wrote ""Buck House" ended its run without achieving anything new. It has never been good, never abysmally bad."

Sam Brooks of the Spinoff viewed an episode online in 2018 and wrote "You can absolutely feel the show reaching to be edgy and break boundaries, and while it's hard to know exactly what boundaries it was breaking back in the 70s, you can feel the self-satisfaction oozing off the screen."

When the second season started the Press said that series one "flopped rather badly" and after the first episode of the second series they wrote "neither situation humour nor the gags seemed to show any great improvement." After the final episode they said "The programme was at least consistent; the last episode was no better than the first." noting "The chief problem with "Buck House" was that the Clarke-Banas material was transplanted into scripts which rejected it."
