= Great Interviews of the Twentieth Century =

Studio album by John Clarke and Bryan Dawe
- Released: November 1990
- Label: WEA
- Producer: Mark Chew

John Clarke albums chronology
Swim Between the Flags (1987)	Great Interviews of the Twentieth Century (1990)	The Annual Report (1991)

Great Interviews of the Twentieth Century is a comedy studio album by New Zealand satirist John Clarke and Australian Bryan Dawe. The album was released in November 1990 and peaked at number 49 on the Australian ARIA Charts.

At the ARIA Music Awards of 1991 the album won the ARIA Award for Best Comedy Release.

== Track listing ==
1. "Concerning the Economy"
2. "The Idea of a University"
3. "Matters of State"
4. "A Great Man"
5. "Australia / U.S. Relations"
6. "The 1989 Ashes Series"
7. "All Stand Please"
8. "The Tradition Continues"
9. "Grace Under Pressure"
10. "On Corporate Matters"
11. "Election 1990"
12. "The Liberals Rampant"
13. "A Mystery Explained"
14. "Party Unity"
15. "A Triumph of Organisation"
16. "A Tragic Loss"
17. "The Consumption Tax Debate"
18. "The Gallipoli Experience"
19. "A Valuable Contribution"
20. "Complete Rooster-Up"
21. "Concerning His Prostate Operation"
22. "The State of Victoria"
23. "The Cambodian Refugee Question"
24. "The Annual Premiers' Conference"
25. "The Killer"

== Charts ==
Chart (1990/91)	Peak position
Australian Albums (ARIA)	49

== Release history ==
Region	Date	Format	Label	Catalogue
Australia	November 1990	LP; Cassette; CD	WEA	903172769
