= Bryan Dawe =

Australian comedian

- Bryan Dawe in 2014
- Born: Bryan John Dawe; 21 March 1948 (age 78); Port Adelaide, South Australia, Australia
- Occupations: Satirist; writer; actor; comedian
- Years active: 1969–present

Bryan John Dawe (born 21 March 1948) is an Australian writer, comedian, actor, political satirist, songwriter, photographer and social activist. He is known predominantly for his long-running collaboration with fellow satirist, John Clarke, which lasted from 1989 until Clarke's death in 2017; Dawe has also achieved success as a painter and public speaker.

== Collaboration with John Clarke ==
Dawe was a regular collaborator of fellow satirist the late John Clarke in the form of mock interviews, first for A Current Affair and then for The 7.30 Report. Dawe would take on the role of interviewer, with Clarke playing the role of a prominent figure or politician. Unusually for topical satire of this type—such as one of Clarke's earlier ventures, The Gillies Report (1984-1985)—Clarke never attempted to explicitly impersonate the figures he represents and always performed them in his own voice and manner. The format generally involved Dawe trying to press for an answer and Clarke trying to evade the question. The duo began writing and presenting the segments in 1989 and switched to The 7.30 Report not long after leaving A Current Affair in 1997. The pair continued to present their weekly interview segment at the end of the Thursday edition of The 7.30 Report. During the 2014 Australian television season, Clarke and Dawe became a self-contained program on the Australian Broadcasting Corporation. The interviews have also been compiled into several books and CD releases, two of which, Great Interviews of the Twentieth Century and The Annual Report, won the ARIA Award for Best Australian Comedy Record. Secret Men's Business was nominated for the same award in 1997.

== Other roles ==
Dawe has a number of other roles outside of his interview collaborations with Clarke. He is a songwriter, winning (along with musician Steve Groves) the Australian Song Festival and then representing Australia in Tokyo at the World Song Festival. Prior to this, in the early 1970s, he worked as an A&R manager for Astor Records and played a significant role in making the Neil Diamond album Hot August Night a major hit in Australia. He is also a painter and photographer and has featured in several gallery exhibitions which combine these two interests.

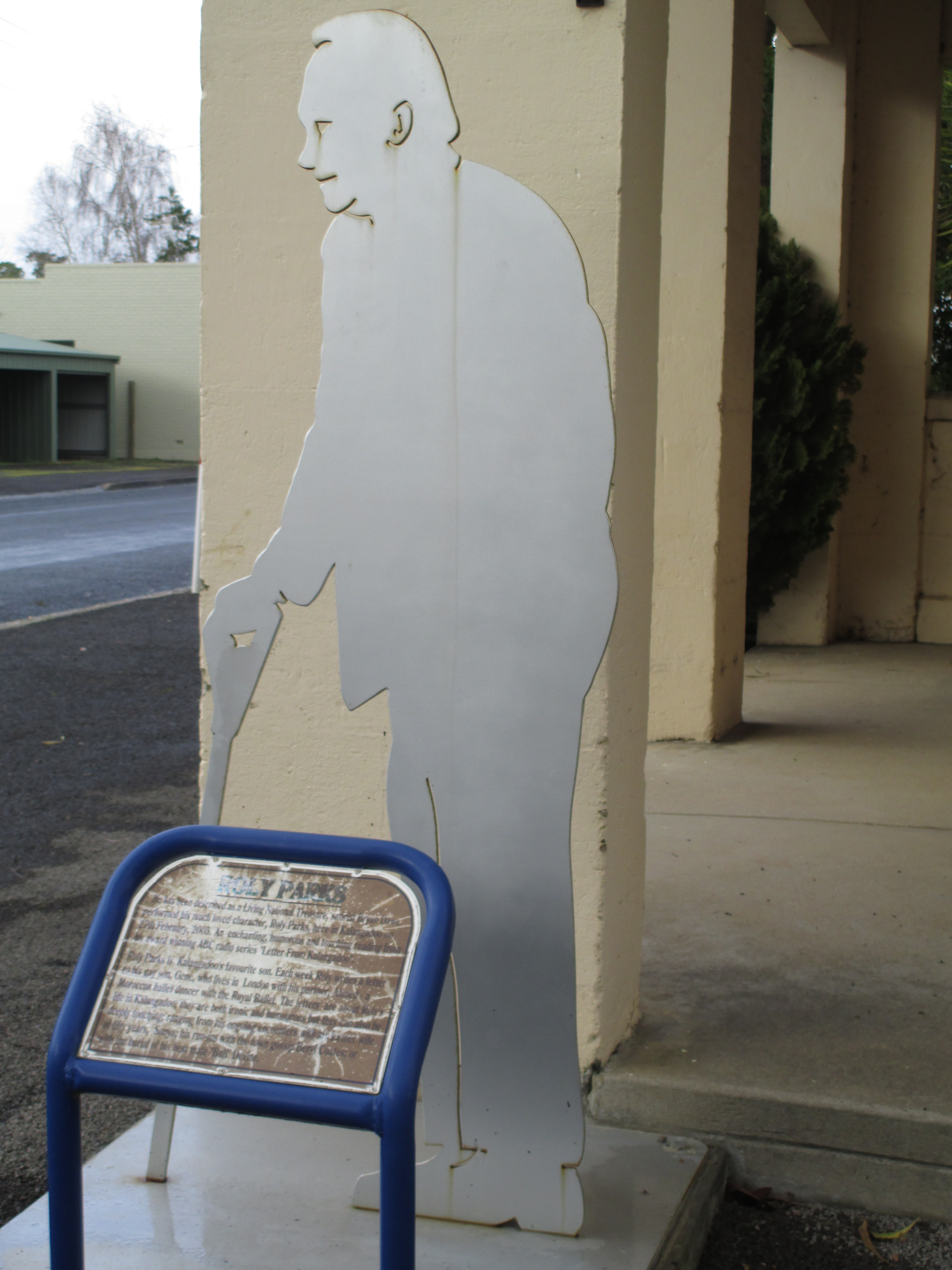
Roly Parks sculpture at Kalangadoo

In the 1980s he wrote and performed with actress Jody Seidel in a long-running radio comedy series centred on the characters of elderly couple Roly and Sonya Parks. In 1990, after four years as head of ABC Radio's comedy unit, he had a stint as both a writer and actor on the comedy series Fast Forward. Dawe had a minor role in the successful Australian film The Castle in 1997. However, of these, the most successful was his role, along with Clarke, in the satirical series The Games. The series was a mockumentary about the Sydney Organising Committee for the Olympic Games and ran from 1998 to 2000. Dawe also had a minor role in the 2003 film The Honourable Wally Norman.

In addition to his interview commitments, Dawe regularly appears on the speaker's circuit as an MC, as guest speaker: either as himself or as one of his alter egos, Sir Murray Rivers QC (retired). Dawe has written and performed extensively on ABC Radio with his satirical characters Sir Murray Rivers and Roly Parks. Some of his Roly Park's Letters from Kalangadoo segments have subsequently been released on a series of CDs.

Dawe has been chair of Common Fate, a not for profit organisation supporting the reconciliation work of Aboriginal leaders Pat Dodson and Paul Briggs. He is a longtime supporter of the fight for a Palestine homeland. He is also an inveterate traveller and has written various articles and a radio series on his travels. He has organised and conducted group tours to Eastern Europe, Syria and Jordan.

In 2012, Dawe had a guest role in the third season of the Australian drama series Tangle.

== Discography ==
=== Studio albums ===
List of albums with Australian chart positions
Title	Album details	Peak chart positions
Title	Album details	AUS
Great Interviews of the Twentieth Century (with John Clarke)	Released: 1990; Label: WEA (903172769-2); Format: LP, CD, Cassette	49
The Annual Report (with John Clarke)	Released: 1991; Label: WEA (903175998-2); Format: CD, Cassette	94
Secret Men's Business (with John Clarke)	Released: 1996; Label: Columbia (487108-2); Format: CD	-

== Awards and nominations ==
=== ARIA Music Awards ===
The ARIA Music Awards is an annual awards ceremony that recognises excellence, innovation, and achievement across all genres of Australian music. Bryan Dawe has won two awards from three nominations.

Year	Nominee / work	Award	Result
1991	Great Interviews of the 20th Century (with John Clarke)	Best Comedy Release	Won
1992	The Annual Report (with John Clarke)	Best Comedy Release	Won
1997	Secret Men's Business (with John Clarke)	Best Comedy Release	Nominated
