= Justice Barrows =

Justice Barrows may refer to:

- Chester W. Barrows (1872–1931), associate justice of the Rhode Island Supreme Court
- William G. Barrows (1821–1886), associate justice of the Maine Supreme Judicial Court

== See also ==
- Charles Barrow (1921–2006), justice of the Texas Supreme Court
