= Competitive barrel rolling =

Barrel Race 2013

Competitive barrel rolling is both a team or individual sport which is practiced by bourbon distilleries in Kentucky. It is also referred to as a bourbon barrel relay. The world championship takes place at the Kentucky Bourbon Festival annually in Bardstown, Kentucky.

== Origins and history ==
The first bourbon barrel relay took place in 1991 at the Kentucky Bourbon Festival in Bardstown, Kentucky. The participants are all employees of one of the Kentucky bourbon whiskey distilleries.

== Playing area ==
The playing area is a 40 by 28 foot (12.2 by 8.5 m) rectangle, with rails on each edge for the barrels to roll upon. A simulated barrel rick with posts and cross beams is constructed on one of the long sides. The rick has a removable bar at one end which the first barrel will strike. A metal plate rests on each corner to aid in both turning the barrel around corners and spinning the barrel into position.

== Players ==
Only four people are allowed to touch barrels on the team. Coaches or set callers can communicate with the players, but can not participate in any physical aspect of the sport.

=== Setter ===
The setter takes the first barrel and rolls it to the rick. His job is to properly align the barrels such that after rolling down the final rail, the bungs of all the barrels are pointed straight up.

=== Rick person ===
The rick person takes the second barrel and delivers it to the setter. His job is to help the barrels roll down the final rail and to reposition any barrels that either impact the rick itself or fall off the rails.

=== Corner ===
The man in the corner takes the third barrel to the first corner and pushes the barrel to the ricker. He stays in this position and moves the remaining barrels between the two rails.

=== Kicker ===
The Kicker's job is to push all the remaining barrels to the corner man as quickly as possible. After all 10 barrels are delivered to the corner person they move to the rick and help the rick person move all barrels back and help with any post stuck or down barrels.

=== Set caller ===
And additional person may be employed to call the sets to the ricker. He will tell the ricker to either spin the barrel or dribble it to get the arrow in the correct position. He can not touch a barrel himself.

=== Safety ===
The safety person stands next to the ricker and ensures that moving barrels do not hit the setter.

== Equipment ==
- Barrels: Ten 55-US-gallon (210 L) wooden barrels are filled with water. The total weight of each is about 500 pounds (230 kg).
- Gloves: Gloves are recommended as the wood construction and metal bands around the barrels can easily cut the hands.
- Shoes: Steel toed shoes are recommended.

== Gameplay ==
Time is started as soon as the first barrel is moved. Time stops when all barrels are in their final resting place on the rick. Barrels must be supported only by the rails, and not the ground between. 10 seconds are subtracted from the time for each barrel whose bung is facing straight up, within two bung diameters. With the time deduction taken into account, talented teams and individuals will often end with negative time.

For the team event, only two barrels can be on the second rail. The remaining barrels can be started behind the corner or on the first rail. For the individual event, 9 barrels are placed in line with the rick, but behind the ricking position. The individual must push one barrel from the starting point around the track, set it and rick it. The remaining 9 just need to be set into position and rolled onto the rick.
