= North and South Barrow Islands (Queensland) =

Islands in Queensland, Australia

North and South Barrow Islands Queensland
- Coordinates: 14°20′46″S 144°39′11″E
- LGA(s): Shire of Cook
- State electorate(s): Cook
- Federal division(s): Leichhardt

North and South Barrow Islands are a pair of islands within the Great Barrier Reef Marine Park in Ninian Bay, 90 km South East of Cape Melville, Queensland, Australia. The islands take their names from Barrow Point, a few hundred metres away, where a mine is located. Barrow Point in turn was named in May 1815 by Lieutenant Charles Jeffreys of the HM Colonial brig Kangaroo, probably after John Barrow, the Secretary to the Admiralty.
