= Tournament (card game) =

Tournament is a patience or solitaire card game which uses two decks of playing cards shuffled together. It is a variant of the much older game of Napoleon's Flank or Nivernaise and was first known as Maréchal Saxe.

== Rules ==
First, the cards are shuffled and dealt as two columns of four cards laid out as a reserve (or "the kibitzers"). The player must make sure that these eight cards include either a king, an ace, or both; otherwise you reshuffle and redeal.

When at least a king or an ace are present, six columns of four cards are then dealt as a tableau (or "the dormitzers"). At least a king or an ace must be present among the first eight cards for the game to work.

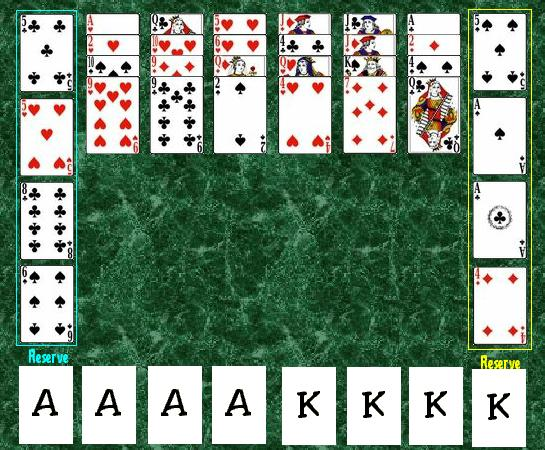
The initial layout in Tournament.

The object of the game is to free one king and one ace of each suit and build on them in suit. The kings should be built down while the aces should be built up. The game is won when all cards are dealt onto the foundations.

The top cards of each column on the tableau and all eight cards on the reserve are available. The cards on the reserve are available to be built on the foundations, and any space it leaves behind are optionally filled from any from the tableau. No building is allowed on the tableau. Spaces in the tableau are immediately filled by a new set of four cards. The top cards of foundations are available to be built on each other.

When the player has made all the moves one could make, four cards from the stock are deal onto each column, and play continues.

When no further play is possible, the player then collects all the cards on the tableau by first gathering the rightmost column and placing it on the pile to its left, and then placing this new pile to the pile on its left and so on. Then, without shuffling, six new columns of four cards each are dealt, and play continues. Two such redeals are allowed.

== Related games ==
Albert Morehead and Geoffrey Mott-Smith claim to have invented Tournament in 1938 in order to improve on the older game (La) Nivernaise or Napoleon's Flank. However, Parlett points out that, in a curious coincidence, it is identical with the game of Maréchal Saxe published in English by "Tarbart" over 30 years earlier and named after the Marshal General of France, Maurice, Count of Saxony. Napoleon's Flank is played exactly as Tournament except the six columns of four cards each are just piles with only their top cards exposed. Here, the reserve is called the "flank" while the piles are the "line."

Cicely is another variant of Nivernaise, which has 8 rather than 6 piles in the tableau. There are no redeals, but building is allowed, making the game much easier to win. Kingsdown Eights is a variation of Tournament and Cicely.

== See also ==
- List of patiences and solitaires
- Glossary of patience or solitaire terms

== Bibliography ==
- Barry, Sheila Anne, World's Best Card Games for One
- Morehead, Albert H. & Mott-Smith, Geoffrey. The Complete Book of Solitaire & Patience Games
- Moyse Jr, Alphonse. 150 Ways to play Solitaire
- Parlett, David. The Penguin Book of Patience
