= Barrell =

Barrell is a surname. Notable people with the surname include:

- Bernard Barrell (1919–2005), English musician, music educator and composer
- Charles Barrell (1887–1959), New Zealand politician of the Labour Party
- Charles Wisner Barrell (1885–1974), writer and Shakespearean scholar
- Donald Barrell (born 1986), rugby union player
- George Barrell Emerson (1797–1881), American educator and pioneer of women's education
- Francis Barrell (died 1679), MP for Rochester
- Francis Barrell (1663–1724), MP for Rochester
- Jim Barrell (born 1959), American professional wrestler
- John Barrell (born 1943), British academic and currently Professor of English at the University of York
- Joseph Barrell (1869–1919), American geologist
- Joseph Barrell (merchant) (1739–1804), merchant in Boston, Massachusetts in the 18th century
- Joyce Howard Barrell, née Gedye (1917–1989), English composer
- Rachel Barrell, British stage performer
- Sue Barrell, British-born Australian meteorologist
- Tony Barrell (broadcaster) (1940–2011), British-born Australian writer and broadcaster
- Tony Barrell (journalist), British journalist
- Tosh Barrell (1888–1960), English professional footballer
