= Upstairs at the Downstairs =

Coordinates: 40°45′48″N 73°58′35″W

Upstairs at the Downstairs was a cabaret nightclub and Off-Broadway theatre located in Manhattan that was active from 1943 through 1974. It was founded as The Playgoers, renamed Upstairs/ Downstairs, and ultimately retitled Upstairs at the Downstairs when moving to new premises at 37 West 56th Street in 1958 where it remained until closing in 1974. It should not be confused with its sister club/theatre Downstairs at the Upstairs.

== History ==
Upstairs at the Downstairs was co-founded by Irving Haber and his wife, Doris Dreyfus, in 1943 as The Playgoers. It was originally located at Sixth Avenue and 57th Street. It went through several name changes before settling on Upstairs/ Downstairs. It became Upstairs at the Downstairs when it moved to new premises at 37 West 56th Street on July 22, 1958. It became a well known venue for satirical revues produced by Julius Monk. It also presented musicals; often featuring well known performers like Joan Rivers, Lily Tomlin, Madeline Kahn, Janie Sell, Vaughn Meader, Mort Sahl, and Linda Lavin among others.

=== Partial lists of musicals premiered at Upstairs at the Downstairs ===
- Four Below (1956, conceptualized by Julius Monk; many writers and composers)
- Demi-Dozen (1958, conceptualized by Julius Monk; many writers and composers)
- Four Below Strikes Back (1960, conceptualized by Julius Monk; many writers and composers)
- Dressed to the Nines (1960, conceptualized by Julius Monk; many writers and composers)
- No Shoestrings (1962, conceptualized by Ben Bagley and directed by Dorothea Freitag; many writers, lyricists, and composers)
- ... And in this Corner (1964, lyrics by Allison Roulston, Michael McWhinney, and Rod Warren; music by Jay Foote, Jerry Powell, and Rod Warren; playwright, Treva Silverman)
- Graham Crackers (1963, created by Ronny Graham, Richard Maltby Jr. and David Shire)
- The Game is Up (1964; conceptualized by Rod Warren; many composers, writers, and lyricists)
- Below the Belt (1966, lyrics by Lesley Davison, David Finkle, Howard Liebling, Michael McWhinney, James Rusk, and Rod Warren; music by Lesley Davison, Marvin Hamlisch, Jerry Powell, James Rusk, Rod Warren, and Bill Weeden; writers, Dee Caruso, Bill Kaufman, Paul Koreto, Bill Levine, Gayle Parent, Treva Silverman, Rod Warren, and Kenny Solms)
