= Meredith Badger =

Australian children's book author

- Born: Australia
- Occupation: Author
- Writing career
- Genres: Children's literature, Young Adult
- Notable works: Fairy School Dropout series, Tweenie Genie series, Shift (as Em Bailey)

Meredith Badger is a children's book author. Her books include the Fairy School Dropout series, the Tweenie Genie series, and two books in the Go Girl! series. She has also written other works, including the young adult novel Shift, under the pseudonyms Em Bailey, M.C. Badger, H.I. Larry

She published her first writing piece in DOLLY Magazine when she was fifteen years old.

Badger was born in Australia and now lives with her daughter and husband in Germany.

== Bibliography ==
=== As Meredith Badger ===
==== Fairy School Dropout series ====
- Fairy School Dropout, Feiwel & Friends, 2010
- Fairy School Dropout Undercover, Feiwel & Friends, 2010
- Fairy School Dropout: Over the Rainbow, Feiwel & Friends, 2011

==== Tweenie Genie series ====
- Tweenie Genie: Genie in Training, Feiwel & Friends, 2011
- Tweenie Genie: Genie High School
- Tweenie Genie: Genie In Charge

==== Go Girl! series ====
- Go Girl! #11: Camp Chaos, Feiwel & Friends, 2008
- Go Girl #12: Back to School, Feiwel & Friends, 2008

=== As Em Bailey ===
- Shift, Hardie Grant Egmont, 2011
- The Special Ones, Houghton Mifflin Harcourt, 2017
