= Geoffrey Barrows =

American inventor

- Born: 1970 (age 55–56); California, United States
- Education: University of Virginia; Stanford University; University of Maryland at College Park
- Occupations: Inventor, entrepreneur Founder & CEO of Centeye
- Employer: United States Naval Research Laboratory
- Organization: Centeye

Geoffrey Louis Barrows (born 1970) is an American inventor and the founder of Centeye, a company that specializes in the development of insect vision for robotics. In 2003 he was recognized as a Young Innovator by being included in the MIT Technology Review's TR100 list. Barrows owns more than six patents for his technology.

Geoffrey Barrows has developed innovative optic-flow sensors to allow both aerial and ground vehicles to travel autonomously, by using the same techniques living creatures such as flying insects do to gauge their altitude and proximity to obstacles in their path.

== Early life and education ==
Geoffrey was born in Sacramento, California, United States in 1970. As his father was a career officer with the United States Air Force, his family moved frequently, with stops in Massachusetts, Alabama, Nebraska, New York, and Germany. Barrows spent 6 years in Germany as a pre-teen before his family settled in Washington, D.C.

He holds a BS in applied mathematics from the University of Virginia, an MS in electrical engineering from Stanford University, and a Ph.D. in electrical engineering from the University of Maryland at College Park.

== Career ==
Before starting his own company Centeye, Inc. in 2000, he was working with the United States Naval Research Laboratory in Washington, D.C. as a research engineer. His company develops bio-inspired microelectronics. Centeye is commercializing optic-flow sensors designed to help unmanned aerial vehicles navigate autonomously by endowing them with the kind of depth perception exhibited by flying insects.

Using standard hobbyist components to build the models, Barrows has constructed toy-like aircraft with complete vision systems – imaging chips and all processors included – that consume a small fraction of a watt of power, with each sensor weighing less than two-tenths of an ounce and the complete aircraft only around 3.5 ounces.

He has open sourced the Arudeye board, a tiny Arduino board with camera built-in.

== Recognition/Awards ==
- In 2003, he was named to the MIT Technology Review's TR100 as one of the top 35 innovators in the world under the age of 35.
- In 2008, he was profiled as Inventor of the Week by Lemelson- MIT Inventor program for implementing optical flow sensor on micro air vehicles.
- His company received a $1,000 grant at the TandemNSI expo in 2015.
- He was listed as a "Trending 40" Federal Innovator and Entrepreneur in 2015.
