= W.A. Barrows =

American politician

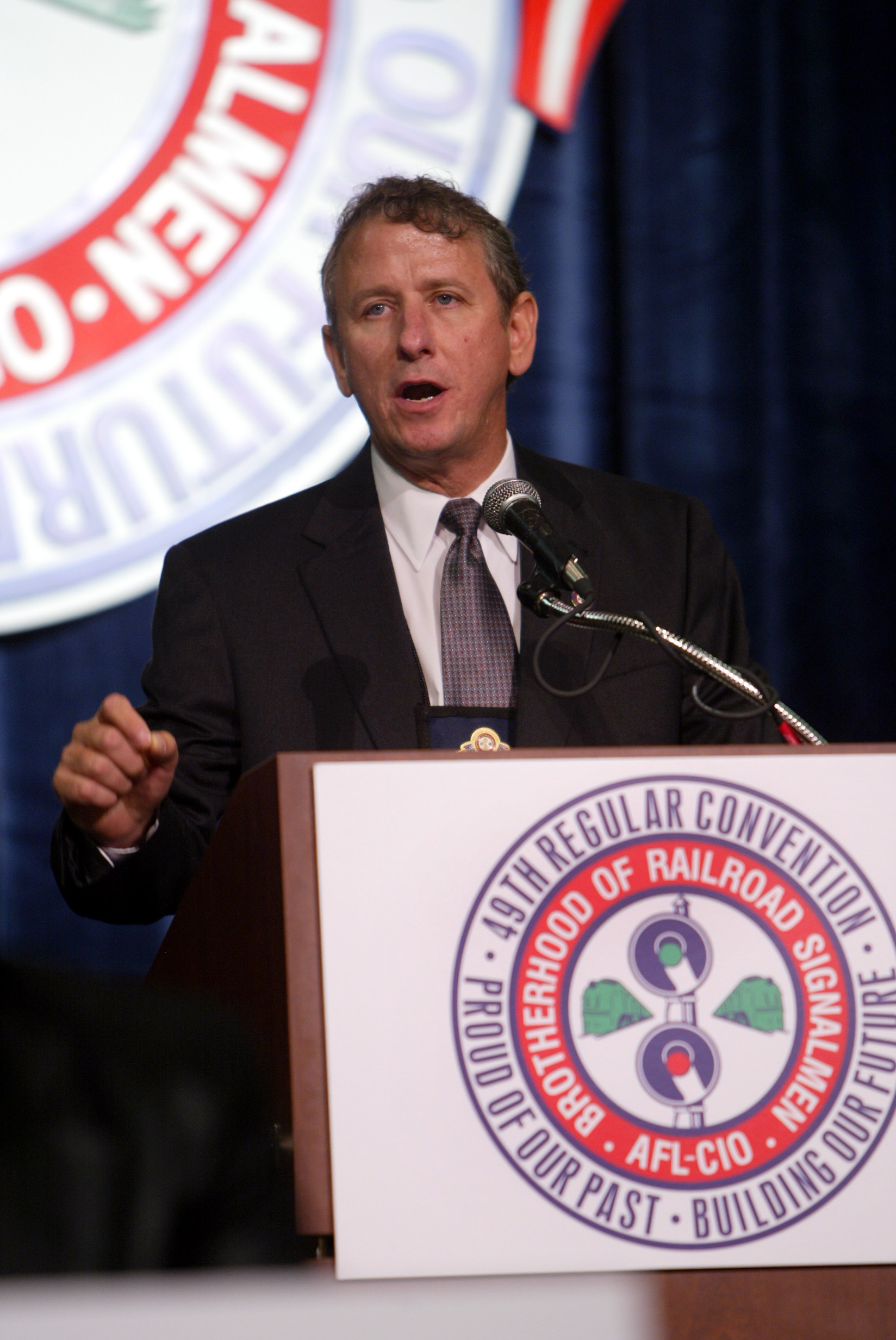
W.A. Barrows addresses the audience at the 49th Regular Convention of the Brotherhood of Railroad Signalmen at Las Vegas, Nevada in 2006

W.A "Walt" Barrows is the current Labor Member of the United States Railroad Retirement Board. He was nominated by President Barack Obama on February 28, 2011 and was confirmed by the U.S. Senate on September 26, 2011. He replaced outgoing board member V.M. "Butch" Speakman, who announced his retirement in 2010. The appointment of Barrows to the Board was supported by a number of labor organizations, including the Brotherhood of Locomotive Engineers and Trainmen, as well as the Transportation Trades Department. Barrows has had a long career in the railroad industry, beginning with Norfolk and Southern Railroad in 1974. He has held numerous positions with Locals 199 and 228, including Local Chairman, Local President, and Recording-Financial Secretary. Most recently, Barrows served as the International Secretary-Treasurer for the Brotherhood of Railroad Signalmen. In addition, he has served as a labor member on the joint healthcare subcommittee, which oversees the Railroad Employee's National Health and Welfare Plan. In 2004, 2007, and 2010, Barrows served as labor trustee, responsible for oversight of the National Railroad Retirement Trust Fund.
