= Barrowcliffe =

Barrowcliffe is an English surname. Notable people with the surname include:

- Geoff Barrowcliffe (1931–2009), English professional footballer
- Mark Barrowcliffe (born 1964), English writer
