= The Tournament (Révoil) =

1812 painting by Pierre Révoil

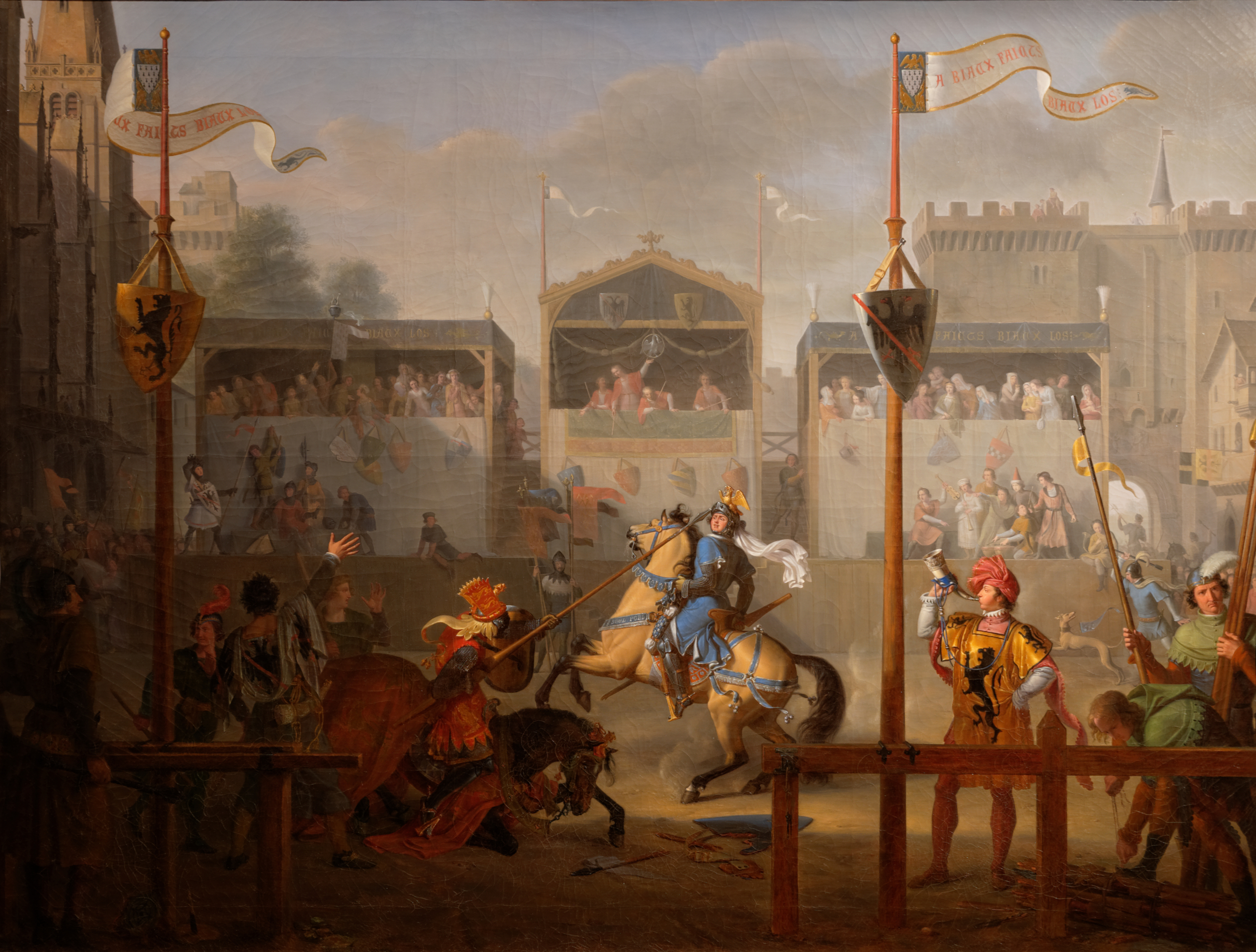
The Tournament (1812) by Pierre Révoil

The Tournament is a major 1812 painting by Pierre Révoil, who presented it to the Museum of Fine Arts of Lyon (which still owns it) sometime before 1815. It shows the final moments of a legend of Bertrand Du Guesclin, when he reveals his identity after competing anonymously in a tournament and beating all comers.

== Sources ==
- Robert Rosenblum et H.W. Janson, 19th-century art, Pearson, 2005 (1984) (ISBN 0 13 189562 1), p. 71.
