= The Tournament (Clarke novel) =

2002 novel by John Clarke

- Author: John Clarke
- Language: English
- Genre: Novel
- Publisher: Text Publishing
- Publication date: 2002
- Publication place: Australia
- Media type: Print
- Pages: 280 pp.
- ISBN: 1877008370

The Tournament is a novel in the form of sports-reportage written by New Zealand-born Australian satirist John Clarke, depicts a fictional international tennis tournament held in Paris and featuring a variety of notable twentieth-century literary, cultural and scientific figures as competitors.

It was published in Australia by Text Publishing in 2002.

Several other identities appear: Charles Darwin as the tournament referee, for example, and Friedrich Nietzsche as the "president and CEO of Nike". Oscar Wilde and James McNeill Whistler provide commentary. Roland Barthes, Emmeline Pankhurst, George Plimpton, Norman Mailer and many others appear as sports reporters covering the match. A demonstration doubles match features Henrik Ibsen and Claude Monet vs. Henry James and Mark Twain.

== Coaches ==
- United States: Ernie Hemingway

== Spectators ==
- Nelson Algren
