= Griffin Barrows =

American gay pornographic actor

- Born: April 1, 1988 (age 38); Chapin, South Carolina, USA
- Occupation: Pornographic actor
- Years active: 2014–present

Griffin Barrows (born April 1, 1988) is an American gay pornographic film actor. After a video of him giving a handjob went viral online in 2017, he gained popularity on Twitter and on the subscription services OnlyFans and JustForFans; on the latter site, he was the most subscribed-to gay pornographic performer in both 2018 and 2019.

== Life and career ==
Barrows grew up in South Carolina in a family he has described as "very conservative" who kicked him out for a period of time, leaving him homeless.

Before working in pornography, Barrows worked as a pastry chef. Looking for extra money, he began working as a gay pornographic actor in 2014, starring in videos for the pornographic studio ChaosMen. His first name was inspired by a griffin card in the card game Magic: The Gathering that he frequently used, while the last name Barrows was given to him by a website editor who made him business cards. In 2016, he starred as Rey in Men.com's gay pornographic parody of the 2015 film Star Wars: The Force Awakens. A video of Barrows giving an unseen man a handjob and getting a premature facial posted to his OnlyFans account went viral on Tumblr and Twitter in November 2017, causing him to become popular on the subscription service JustForFans, where he was the most subscribed-to gay pornographic performer in 2018 and 2019. He also gained popularity on Twitter, where he had more than 675,000 followers in 2021. Barrows won the inaugural JustForFans Fan Favorite Award at the 20th Grabby Awards in May 2019. In 2019, he frequently appeared in videos with fellow gay pornographic actor Gabriel Cross.

Barrows was featured in the ABC News Original documentary OnlyFans: Selling Sexy, which was released on Hulu in February 2021. He was signed as an addition to the Fleshjack Boys roster by Interactive Life Forms in September 2021; the company released a sleeve modeled after his buttocks and a dildo modeled after his penis. A meme featuring an image of Barrows went viral in 2023.

== Public image ==
In 2020, Cameron McCool of DNA called Barrows "the master of head" and wrote that he "turned the humble blowjob into an art and a successful business". The Chicago Reader called Barrows "arguably one of [the] most recognizable gay male creators" on OnlyFans in 2021.

== Awards ==
List of awards and nominations, with award, year, category, nominated work, result, and reference shown
Award	Year	Category	Nominee(s)	Result	Ref.
GayVN Awards	2019	Best Three-Way Sex Scene	Every Hole Gets Filled	Nominated	
Grabby Awards	2017	Best Newcomer	Himself	Nominated	
Grabby Awards	2017	Hottest Bottom	Himself	Nominated	
Grabby Awards	2017	Best Group	Urban Spokes	Nominated	
Grabby Awards	2018	Squirt.org Fan Favorite Porn Star	Himself	Nominated	
Grabby Awards	2019	JustForFans Fan Favorite Award	Himself	Won	
Str8UpGayPorn Awards	2018	Best Three-Way Scene	Every Hole Gets Filled	Nominated	
Str8UpGayPorn Awards	2020	Favorite Fan Content Creator	Himself	Nominated	
