= Barrow Hill, Dorset =

Settlement in Dorset, England

Coordinates: 50.76°N 02.07°W

Barrow Hill
- Location within Dorset
- OS grid reference: SY9596
- Unitary authority: Dorset
- Ceremonial county: Dorset
- Region: South West
- Country: England
- Sovereign state: United Kingdom
- Police: Dorset
- Fire: Dorset and Wiltshire
- Ambulance: South Western

Barrow Hill is a small settlement in Dorset, England. It is situated on the A350 road approximately 4 miles (6.4 km) northwest of Poole. It lies between Lytchett Matravers and Corfe Mullen, though is in the civil parish of Sturminster Marshall.

== History ==
A Mesolithic era flint scraper was found at Barrow Hill and is now in the collections of the British Museum.
