= David Wenham =

Australian actor

David Wenham AM
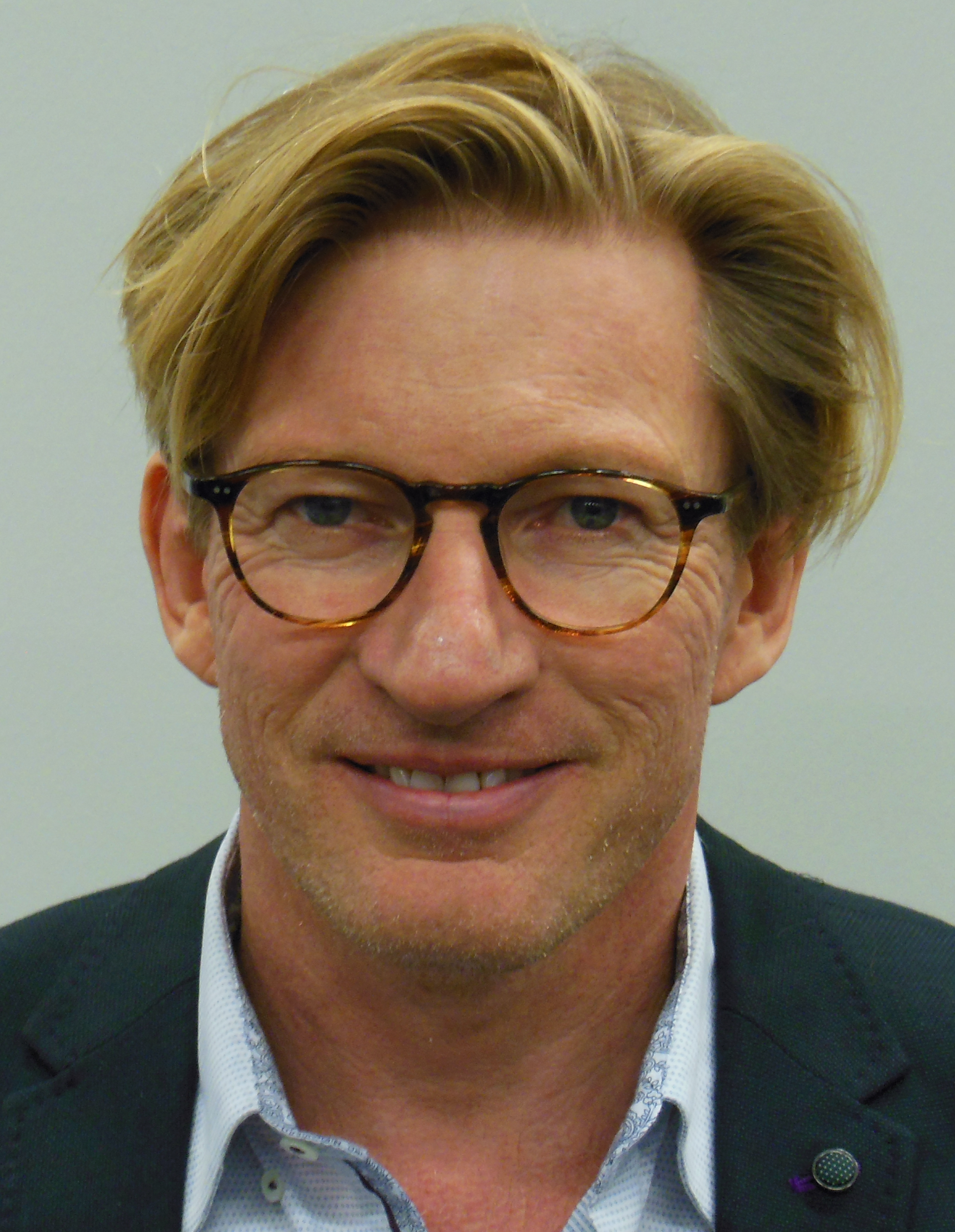
- Wenham in 2016
- Born: Marrickville, Sydney, Australia
- Education: Western Sydney University (BA)
- Occupation: Actor
- Years active: 1987–present
- Partner: Kate Agnew (1994–present)
- Children: 2

David Wenham is an Australian actor who has appeared in film, television and theatre. He is known for his roles as Faramir in The Lord of the Rings film trilogy, Friar Carl in Van Helsing and Van Helsing: The London Assignment, Dilios in 300 and its sequel 300: Rise of an Empire, Al Parker in Top of the Lake, Lieutenant John Scarfield in Pirates of the Caribbean: Dead Men Tell No Tales, and Hank Snow in Elvis. He is known in his native Australia for his role as Johnny Spitieri in Gettin' Square, Diver Dan in SeaChange and Price Galese in Les Norton.

== Early life ==
Wenham has five older sisters—Helen, Anne, Carmel, Kathryn, and Maree—and one older brother, Peter. He was raised in the Roman Catholic faith and attended Christian Brothers' High School, Lewisham, Sydney.

== Career ==
Wenham started his career as an actor after graduating from Theatre Nepean at Western Sydney University with a Bachelor of Arts (Performing Arts) in 1987. Wenham's television credits include several films, such as his AFI award-winning role in 1997's Simone de Beauvoir's Babies, and his role as the outwardly laid back but deeply enigmatic diver Dan Della Bosca in the 1998 and 1999 seasons of the ABC television series SeaChange. His role as "Diver Dan" has made the actor something of a sex symbol, although he dislikes thinking of himself as such, and he has been voted Australia's "sexiest man alive". A portrait of Wenham by artist Adam Cullen won the Archibald Prize in 2000. Wenham appeared in 1999 for the Sydney Theatre Company's production of Yasmina Reza's play 'Art'.

Australian films Wenham has starred in include The Boys (1998) based on the play of the same name premiered in 1991 with Wenham by Griffin Theatre Company and in turn based on the murder of Anita Cobby, Molokai (1999), based on the life of Father Damien, The Bank (2001), Gettin' Square (2003), Stiff (2004), The Brush-Off (2004), and Three Dollars (2005). Wenham has periodically appeared in Hollywood films; he is known for playing Faramir, son of Denethor II, in New Line Cinema's The Lord of the Rings: The Two Towers and The Lord of the Rings: The Return of the King.

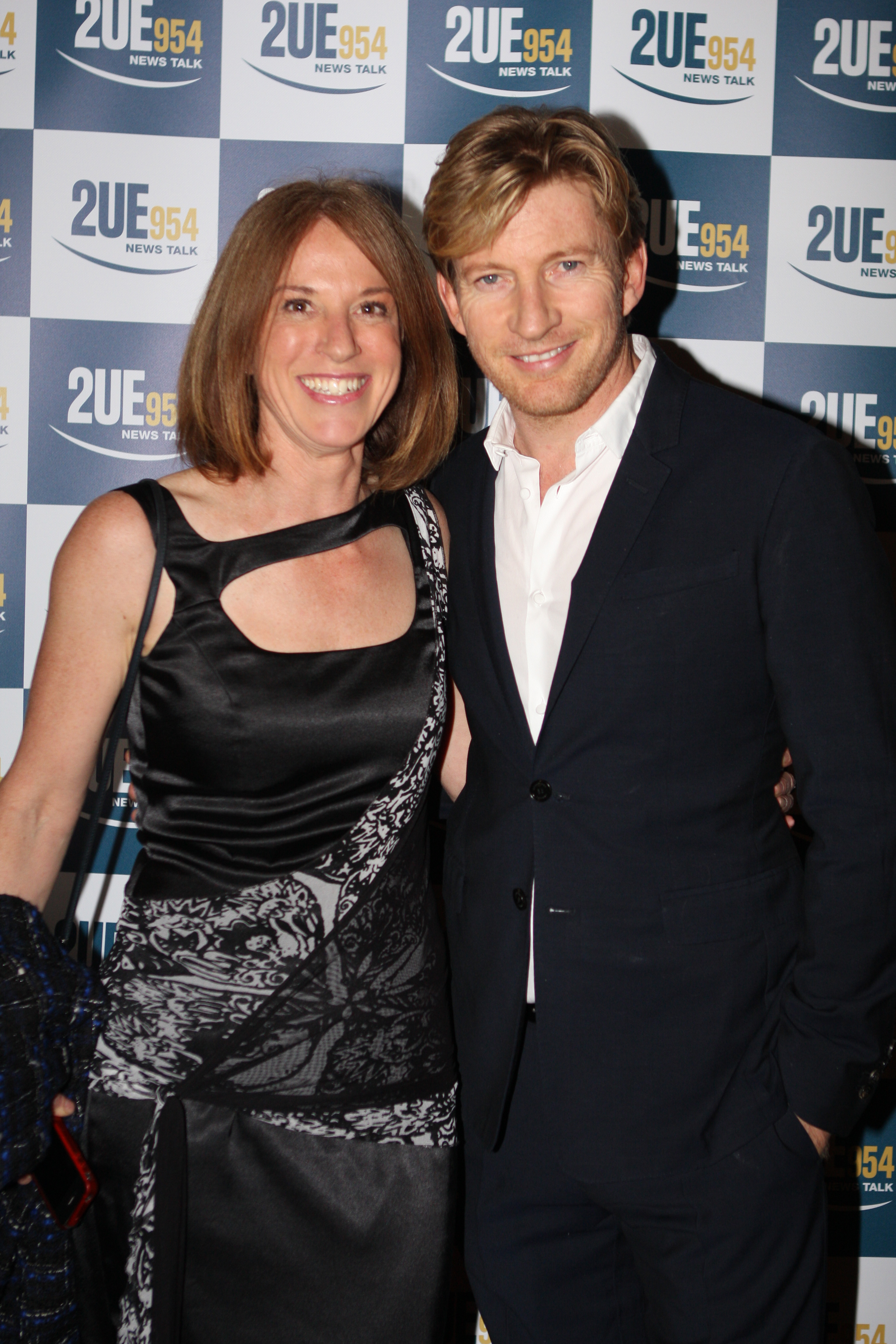
Wenham at the premiere of Oranges and Sunshine in 2011

He was seen in Van Helsing playing Hugh Jackman's sidekick, Friar Carl. His character, Dilios, narrated and appeared in the 2007 film 300. He reprises his role of Dilios in both the 2014 sequel 300: Rise of an Empire and the video game 300: March to Glory for Sony PlayStation Portable, which contains a substantial amount of new dialogue. Minor roles of Wenham's in overseas films include in The Crocodile Hunter as a park ranger, and briefly in Moulin Rouge! as Audrey. Wenham stars in the music video for Alex Lloyd's single "Brand New Day". In 2008's Australia, he reunited with Hugh Jackman playing antagonist Neil Fletcher.

In 2009, he appeared in Public Enemies as one of John Dillinger's men. He also returned to the stage, this time as the lead actor, Jerry Springer, in the British musical Jerry Springer: The Opera. During its 6-day run at the Sydney Opera House he played in sold-out performances alongside ARIA award-winning singer Kate Miller-Heidke.

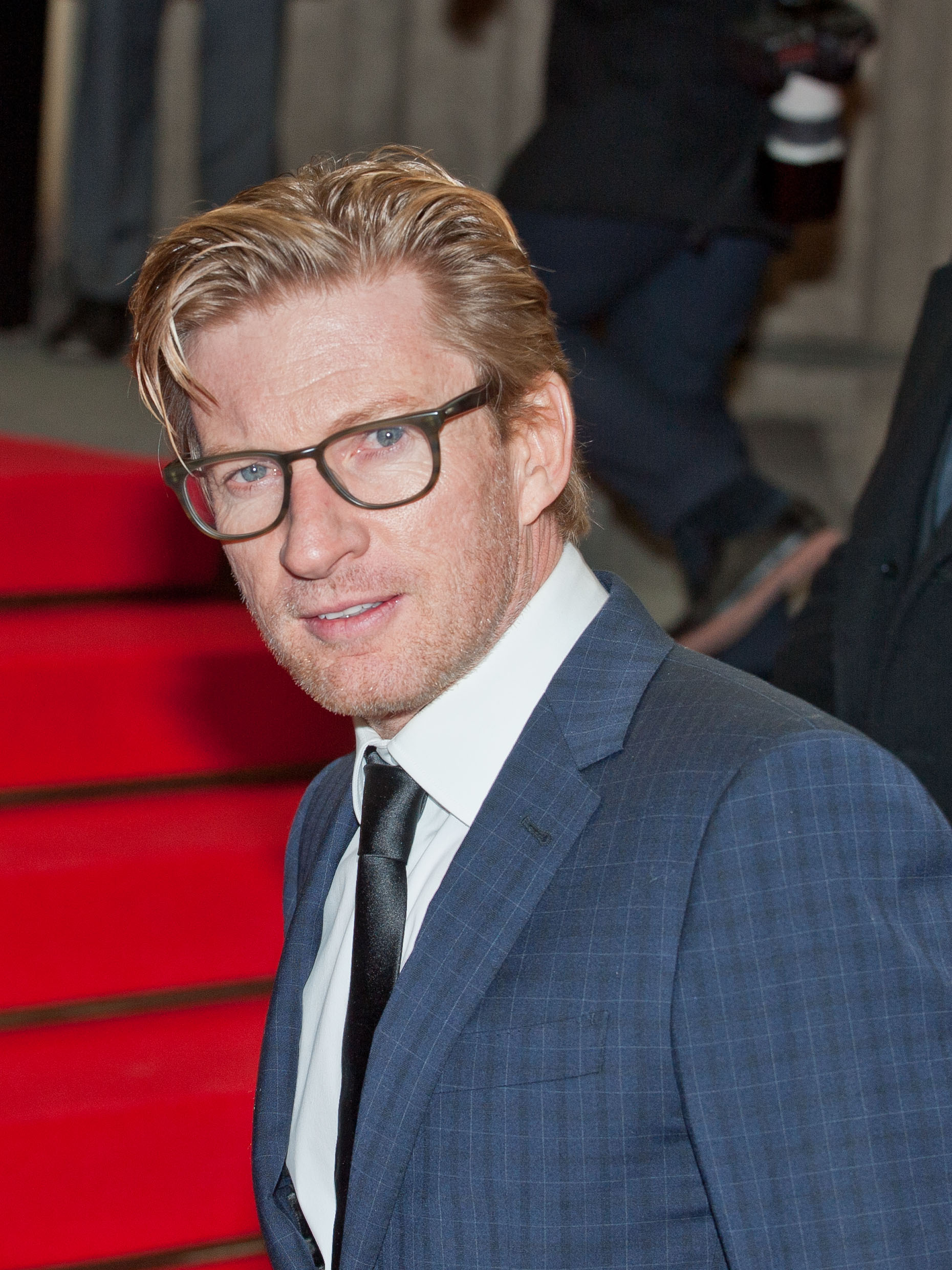
Wenham at the premiere of The Turning in 2014

In 2010, he played the character Len in the Australian drama film Oranges and Sunshine. Also in 2010, Wenham starred as the disgraced Melbourne lawyer Andrew Fraser in the Australian television series Killing Time. This ten-part series shows Fraser's fall from grace as he defends many Melbourne criminals during the 1980s and 1990s. It was shown on TV1 in late 2011. On stage, Wenham appeared in Benedict Andrews' production of The Seagull for Belvoir.

Wenham plays New Zealand detective Al Parker alongside Elisabeth Moss in the 2013 BBC series Top of the Lake.

In 2013, Wenham returned to the stage to play the lead role of John Proctor in the Melbourne Theatre Company's mid-year production of Arthur Miller's The Crucible.

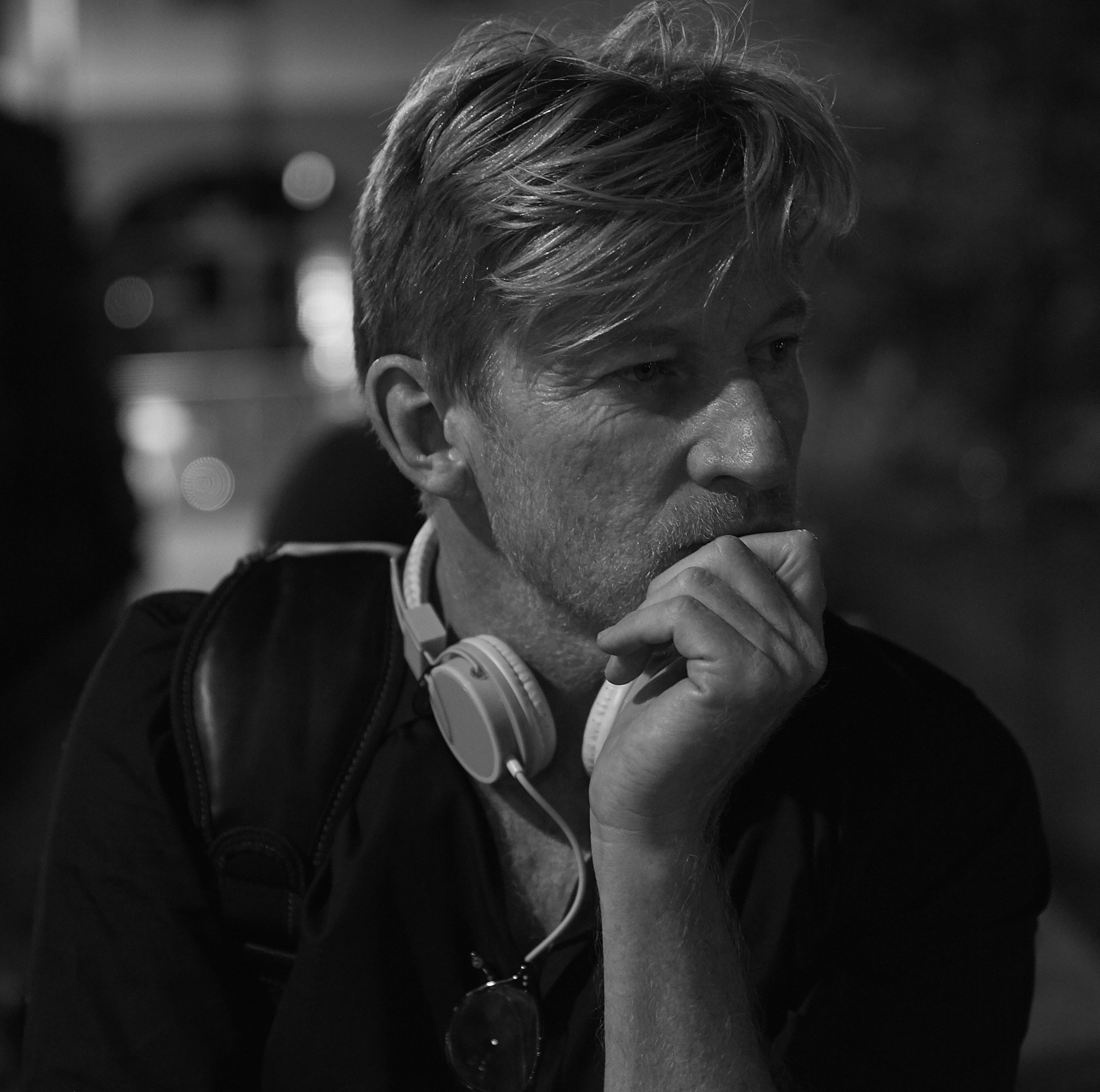
Wenham in 2015

In 2014, Wenham starred as Patrick Jones in Paper Planes, released on 15 January 2015. That same year, Wenham voiced the role Jacko a frilled-neck lizard, in Blinky Bill the Movie. In 2016, Wenham played the role of John, the adoptive father of Saroo Brierley in Lion.

Wenham played the role of the villain Harold Meachum in the Netflix original television series Iron Fist, which premiered in March 2017.

In 2018, Wenham played the voice of Johnny Town-Mouse in Peter Rabbit, a role he reprised in the 2021 sequel Peter Rabbit 2: The Runaway.

In 2020, it was announced that Wenham was cast as Jasper Queller in the upcoming Netflix thriller series Pieces of Her, which is adapted from the Karin Slaughter novel of the same name.

In 2022, Wenham returned to work with director Baz Luhrmann, playing the role of country singer Hank Snow in the biographical film Elvis.

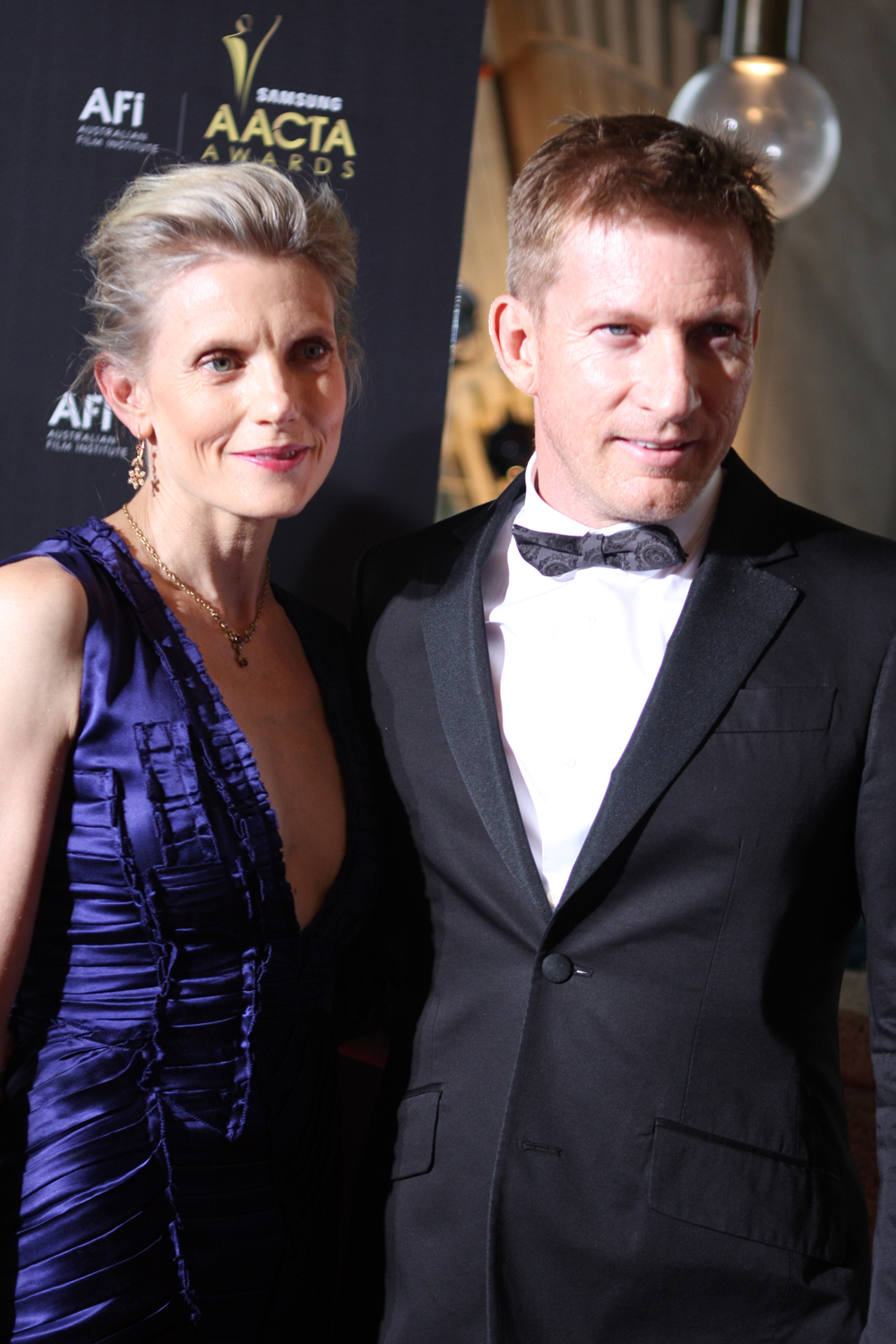
Wenham and his longtime partner, actress Kate Agnew, at the 2012 AACTA Awards

In November 2022, Wenham played Scrooge in a production of A Christmas Carol at the Comedy Theatre, Melbourne; his performance was praised for showing Scrooge as traumatised.

In October 2025, Wenham was named in the cast for the feature film Zac Power. In 2026, he performed the one-person play An Iliad for the Sydney Theatre Company.

He was appointed a Member of the Order of Australia in the 2023 Australia Day Honours.

== Personal life ==
Wenham met actress and yoga teacher Kate Agnew at a play at Belvoir St Theatre in Sydney, Australia, in 1994. They began a relationship that year. They have two daughters. As of 2020, they live together in a $2.75 million-dollar house in Brisbane, Australia.

On 20 September 2006, Wenham read a poem called "The Crocodiles are Crying" by Rupert McCall at the memorial service for Steve Irwin.

Wenham is a Sydney Swans supporter.

== Filmography ==
=== Film ===
Year	Title	Role	Notes
1992	Greenkeeping	Trevor	
1992	Seeing Red	Frank	
1993	Don't Touch Wood!	Lenny	Film developed by ANZ Bank and Small Business Victoria
1994	Gino	Trevor	
1994	Tran the Man	Raymond "Tran" Moss	Short film
1994	No Escape	Hotel Guard No. 2	
1995	Roses Are Red	Brian	
1996	Cosi	Doug	
1996	Idiot Box	Bank Teller	
1998	The Boys	Brett Sprague	
1998	Dark City	Schreber's Assistant	
1998	A Little Bit of Soul	Richard Shorkinghorn	
1999	Molokai: The Story of Father Damien	Father Damien	
2000	Better Than Sex	Josh	
2001	Russian Doll	Ethan	
2001	Moulin Rouge!	Audrey	
2001	The Bank	Jim Doyle	
2001	Dust	Luke	
2002	The Crocodile Hunter: Collision Course	Sam Flynn	
2002	Pure	Lenny	
2002	The Lord of the Rings: The Two Towers	Faramir	
2003	Gettin' Square	Johnny Spitieri	
2003	Basilisk Stare	Dave	
2003	The Lord of the Rings: The Return of the King	Faramir	
2004	Van Helsing	Friar Carl	
2004	Van Helsing: The London Assignment	Friar Carl	
2005	Three Dollars	Eddie Harnovey	
2005	The Proposition	Eden Fletcher	
2006	300	Dilios	
2008	Married Life	John O'Brien	
2008	The Children of Huang Shi	Barnes	
2008	Australia	Neil Fletcher	
2009	Public Enemies	Harry Pierpont	
2009	Pope Joan	Gerold	
2010	Legend of the Guardians: The Owls of Ga'Hoole	Digger (voice)	Animated film
2010	Oranges and Sunshine	Len	
2014	300: Rise of an Empire	Dilios	
2015	Paper Planes	Patrick	
2015	Blinky Bill the Movie	Jacko (voice)	Animated film
2015	Force of Destiny	Robert	
2016	Goldstone	Johnny	
2016	Lion	John Brierley	
2017	Pirates of the Caribbean: Dead Men Tell No Tales	Lieutenant John Scarfield	
2017	Ellipsis		Director
2018	Peter Rabbit	Johnny Town-Mouse (voice)	
2018	In Like Flynn	Christian Travers	
2018	Nekrotronic	Luther	
2019	Dirt Music	Jim Buckridge	
2021	Peter Rabbit 2: The Runaway	Johnny Town-Mouse (voice)	
2022	Elvis	Hank Snow	
2022	Mortal Kombat Legends: Snow Blind	Kano (voice)	Animated film
2025	Spit	Johnny Spitieri	
TBA	Subversion	TBA	Post-production
TBA	Zac Power	TBA	Filming

=== Television ===
Year	Title	Role	Notes	Ref
1987	A Country Practice	Ambulanceman 1	Episode: "Mozart Rules – Part 1"	
1987	Sons and Daughters	Debt Collector	Episode: "#1.954"	
1988	A Country Practice	Scott Galbraith	2 episodes	
1990	Come In Spinner	Australian soldier	Mini-series	
1991	Police Rescue	Ferret	Episode: "The Cosmic Lightbeam"	
1992	A Country Practice	David Cornish	2 episodes	
1994	Blue Heelers	William Cassidy	Episode: "The Folly of Youth"	
1996	Blue Heelers	Robbie Doyle	Episode: "Happy Families"	
1997	Simone de Beauvoir's Babies	Ian	all 4 episodes	
1997	Return to Jupiter	Dr Ghrobak	2 episodes	
1998–1999	SeaChange	Dan Della Bosca	15 episodes	
2004	Murray Whelan: Stiff	Murray Whelan	Telemovie	
2004	Murray Whelan: The Brush-Off	Murray Whelan	Telemovie	
2006	Answered by Fire	Mark Waldman	Two-part mini-series	
2009	Deadliest Warrior	Narrator	Credited as "Drew Skye"	
2011	Killing Time	Andrew Fraser	10 episodes	
2012	Dripping in Chocolate	Bennett O'Mara		
2013, 2017	Top of the Lake	Al Parker	7 episodes	
2013	Better Man	Julian McMahon	4 episodes	
2014	The Code	Ian Bradley	6 episodes	
2015	Banished	Captain Arthur Phillip, 1st Governor of New South Wales		
2017	Iron Fist	Harold Meachum	10 episodes	
2018	Romper Stomper	Jago Zoric	6 episodes	
2019	Les Norton	Price Galese	10 episodes	
2020	The Letter for the King	Sir Tiuri the Valiant	2 episodes	
2021	Pieces of Her	Jasper Queller	Main cast	
2022	Joe vs. Carole	Don Lewis	1 episode	
2024	Fake	Joe Burt	8 episodes	
2026	Dalliance	Gary Brennan	TV series	
2026	Below	Steve Bruner	6 episodes	

=== Video games ===
Year	Title	Role	Notes
2003	The Lord of the Rings: The Return of the King	Faramir	
2007	300: March to Glory	Dilios, Narrator	

=== Other appearances ===
Year	Title	Role	Notes
2015	Who Do You Think You Are?	Himself	Series 7, episode 4
2022	Shackleton: The Greatest Story of Survival	Self	Documentary
2022	ABC 90 Celebrate!	Self	TV special
2022–23	The ABC Of	Self	10 episodes

== Awards and nominations ==
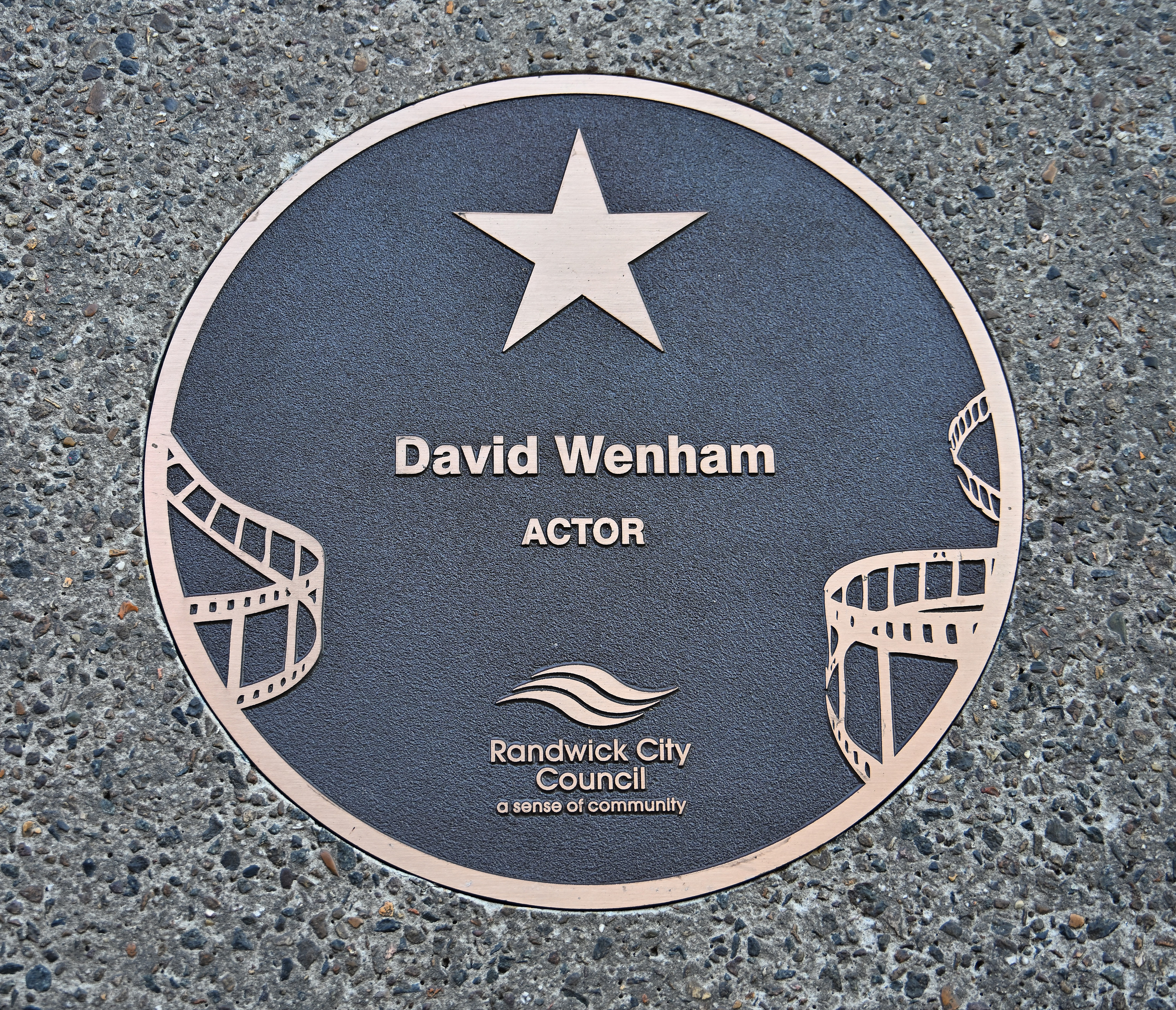
Wenham's plaque at the Australian Film Walk of Fame, Ritz Cinema, Randwick, Sydney

- Australian Film Institute Award for Best Lead Actor in Television Drama for Simone de Beauvoir's Babies (1997) – winner
- Australian Film Institute Award for Best Lead Actor in Television Drama for Answered by Fire (2006) – winner
- Saturn Award for Best Supporting Actor for 300 (2007) – nominated
