= Rebecca Barrow =

British young adult author

Rebecca Barrow is a British young adult author. Her works include You Don't Know Me But I Know You (2017), This Is What It Feels Like (2018), Interview with the Vixen (2020), Bad Things Happen Here (2022), And Don't Look Back (2023), and The Tournament (2025). She's also included in the Fools in Love (2021) anthology edited by Ashley Herring Blake and Rebecca Podos. She is scheduled to publish Doe in 2026.

In 2025, Publishers Weekly named The Tournament one of the year's best books for young adults.

== Personal life ==
Barrow is queer. Barrow earned a place at university but decided not to go.

== Publications ==
- You Don't Know Me But I Know You. New York: HarperTeen. 2017. ISBN 978-0-06-249419-1.
- This Is What It Feels Like. HarperCollins. 2018. ISBN 978-0-062-49423-8.
- Interview with the Vixen. New York: Scholastic Inc. 2020. ISBN 978-1-338-56913-1.
- Blake, Ashley Herring; Podos, Rebecca, eds. (2021). "Bloom". Fools in Love: Fresh Twists on Romantic Tales. Philadelphia: Running Press Teens. ISBN 978-0-7624-7234-5.
- Bad Things Happen Here. New York: Margaret K. McElderry Books. 2022. ISBN 978-1-5344-9743-6.
- And Don't Look Back. New York: Margaret K. McElderry Books. 2023. ISBN 978-1-6659-3227-1.
- The Tournament. New York: Margaret K. McElderry Books. 2025. ISBN 978-1-6659-3230-1. OCLC 1460920141.
- Doe. New York: Nancy Paulsen Books. 2026. ISBN 979-8-217-00634-2.
