= Umbrella Entertainment =

Australian film production and distribution company

Umbrella Entertainment Pty. Ltd.
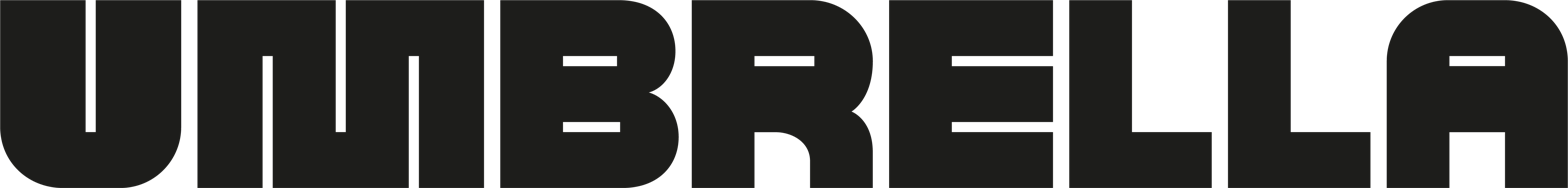
- Type: Private
- Industry: Entertainment
- Founded: 4 August 2001; 25 years ago
- Founders: Jeff Harrison
- Headquarters: Abbotsford, Victoria, Australia
- Area served: Australia and New Zealand
- Key people: Jeff Harrison (Managing Director); Ari Harrison (General Manager)
- Products: Cinema; DVD; Blu-ray; Digital Video; Video on demand
- Website: umbrellaent.com.au

Umbrella Entertainment Pty Ltd, now trading as Umbrella, is an Australian film distributor founded in 2001 by Jeff Harrison. Based in Victoria, the company operates across theatrical distribution, home entertainment, digital distribution, and streaming in Australia and New Zealand. In 2023 it launched the ad-supported streaming platform Brollie, and in 2025 it rebranded from Umbrella Entertainment to Umbrella.

== History ==
Umbrella Entertainment was founded by Jeff Harrison, following his career in music distribution. The company began as a home entertainment business and later expanded into theatrical distribution in Australia and New Zealand.

In 2015, Umbrella began distributing films digitally to online streaming services, including Australian hits, such as The Big Steal (1990) and Malcolm (1986), which were made available on Amazon Prime Video. Also that year, Jeff Harrison was appointed treasurer of Australian Independent Distributors Association (AIDA).

On 23 November 2023, Umbrella launched their own free ad-supported streaming service titled Brollie (taken from the British slang term for umbrella).

In August 2025, Umbrella launched Umbrella Gaming, a game publishing division focused on supporting and releasing independent video games from Australasia. Its first announced title was Pro Jank Footy by Powerbomb Games.

== Overview ==
The company distributes film and television to both Australia and New Zealand, and undertakes rights management activities for theatrical and non-theatrical distribution, television licensing, video-on-demand, hotels and air-lines. Umbrella specialises in the restoration and distribution of Australian classic cinema. In addition to distributing the original product, Umbrella seeks out and interviews original performers, film makers, cast, crew, and other relevant extras for each release.

Umbrella Entertainment's commercial library consists mostly of Australian and Ozploitation films. The company has a history of regularly restoring genre classics such as Razorback, Frog Dreaming, The Man From Hong Kong, and Mad Dog Morgan. In addition to Australian films, Umbrella Entertainment exhibits rare and classic cult films in Australia and New Zealand. Notable examples include the restoration of the 1990 remake of Night of the Living Dead and Night of the Creeps. All restorations are scanned in either 4K and 2K from original film materials.

== Theatrical distribution ==
Umbrella distributes films theatrically across Australia and New Zealand, working across both local productions and international acquisitions. Since 2014, Umbrella Entertainment has collaborated with Australian production company Causeway Films, including the release of The Babadook, Cargo, and Buoyancy.

In the 2020s, Umbrella continued to release films in cinemas while expanding its theatrical slate. Recent titles associated with the company include Talk to Me, Late Night with the Devil, Every Little Thing, and Birdeater, the latter of which won the Audience Award at the Sydney Film Festival. Umbrella has continued to acquire and distribute local and international genre films for Australia and New Zealand, including Redux Redux, The Surrender, Angel’s Egg, Black Sheep 2, Stake-Out, Bone Lake and When Darkness Loves Us.

Upcoming and announced releases include Lesbian Space Princess, which received the Teddy Award at the Berlin International Film Festival, as well as We Bury the Dead and the music documentary Sweat It Out!.

To celebrate the 85th birthday of Sydney's Ritz Cinema in 2022, a year-long program of "Australia on Celluloid" was announced to showcase classic Australian films on 35mm print. The program was presented in partnership with Umbrella Entertainment and the National Film and Sound Archive (NFSA).

Umbrella also acquires international titles for local distribution, including films such as Return to Silent Hill and Exit 8.

Umbrella is also involved in projects at the production stage, with titles such as Bluebottle, and Fear is the Rider, from writer/director/producer John Michael McDonagh, receiving support from Screen Australia and to be distributed locally.

== Sanctuary Pictures ==
In March 2023, general manager Ari Harrison launched a new film production company under Umbrella Entertainment called Sanctuary Pictures, in partnership with Australian producer Julie Ryan of Cyan Films. Harrison has previously executive produced and co-produced several films, including Talk to Me and The Survival of Kindness in 2022. Sanctuary Pictures aimed to first focus on independent feature films, later planning to branch into premium TV series.

In February 2024, producer Jasmin McSweeney, who is based in Wellington, New Zealand, joined the team. She is also head of sales & acquisitions for Umbrella.

In May 2025, Sanctuary Pictures' first feature film, a horror-thriller called Penny Lane Is Dead directed by Mia'Kate Russell, was marketed at Cannes Film Festival. The film is supported by the SAFC and the Adelaide Film Festival Investment Fund, with post-production by KOJO Studios. Harrison and Ryan of Sanctuary, along with Andre Lima, are producing the film. It is scheduled to have its red carpet screening at the Adelaide Film Festival on 18 October 2025.

Also in May 2025, the Wake in Fright Development Initiative was jointly launched by the Wake in Fright Trust, Umbrella Entertainment, Sanctuary Pictures, and the Australian Academy of Cinema and Television Arts. The national film development program offers A$30,000 in funding and development support by Sanctuary Pictures, with the goal of progressing the film into production. The focus is on thriller and horror films, especially those which magnify the voices of underrepresented groups in society.

As of July 2025, Harrison is the director and owner of Sanctuary Pictures, with the company registered in Victoria.

== Restoration of Australian films ==
Umbrella Entertainment has a long history of restoring and distributing rare, classic, and cult titles. As of 2013, Umbrella Entertainment had restored over 100 Australian film in high definition, often in collaboration with the National Film & Sound Archive. As well as being sourced from NFSA archives, Umbrella Entertainment produces their own extra featurettes and interviews with cast and crew, gaining access to previous untouched archival materials including footage, outtakes, interviews and production documents.

On the capacity at which Umbrella has restored Australian cinema, producer Antony I. Ginnane said "Apart from the government- funded NFSA, Umbrella has done more than any other entity to restore and re-spotlight Australian cinema from the 1950s through to the 1990s". English-Australian director Brian Trenchard-Smith wrote "Umbrella and Madman's commitment to release past Australian films on DVD is a significant step in preserving our movie heritage... Contemporary audiences can now be introduced to a broad spectrum of Oz Cinema from classics and crowd pleasers to noble failures and underrated obscurities".

In 2017, the South Australian Film Corporation (SAFC) partnered with Umbrella Entertainment to restore 25 SAFC-produced titles.

Umbrella Entertainment has been involved in the restoration and reissue of Wake in Fright, a landmark Australian film directed by Ted Kotcheff. The film, which had long been difficult to access, underwent a major restoration process after elements were recovered and preserved.

Umbrella later undertook a new 4K restoration of the film, scanned from original materials and developed in collaboration with filmmaker Mark Hartley. The restoration formed part of the company’s broader focus on preserving Australian cinema and reintroducing significant works to contemporary audiences. The restored version has been exhibited in cinemas and at film festivals, and released across home entertainment formats, contributing to renewed critical and audience interest in the film.

=== Selected list of restored films ===
Since it was founded, Umbrella Entertainment has led the restoration of a number of Australian classic films, often in collaboration with the NFSA and ROAR Digital. Titles restored and remastered by Umbrella Entertainment include:

- The Chant of Jimmie Blacksmith
- Road Games
- Long Weekend
- The Man From Hong Kong
- Dark Age
- Cosi
- Body Melt
- Malcolm
- Angel Baby
- Sunday Too Far Away
- Breaker Morant
- The Club
- Storm Boy
- Money Movers
- The Shiralee
- Picnic at Hanging Rock
- Puberty Blues
- Shame
- The F.J. Holden
- The Adventures of Barry McKenzie
- Far East
- Buddies
- Dimboola
- Celia
- Mouth to Mouth
- Spirits of the Air, Gremlins of the Clouds
- Shine
- Burke & Wills
- Jedda
- Goodbye Paradise
- Wake In Fright
- Salute of the Jugger

== Brollie ==
Brollie
- Website type: Subscription video on demand
- Available in: English
- Area served: Australia
- Owner: Umbrella Entertainment
- Website: watch.brollie.com.au
- Registration: Required
- Launched: 24 November 2023; 2 years ago
- Current status: Active

Brollie is a video-on-demand streaming service dedicated to streaming classic Australian movies and TV shows. The serviced was launched by Umbrella Entertainment on 24 November 2023 as a free-streaming service, and has been described as an "Aussie content focused" streaming platform.
