= Jacqueline McKenzie =

Australian actress (born 1967)

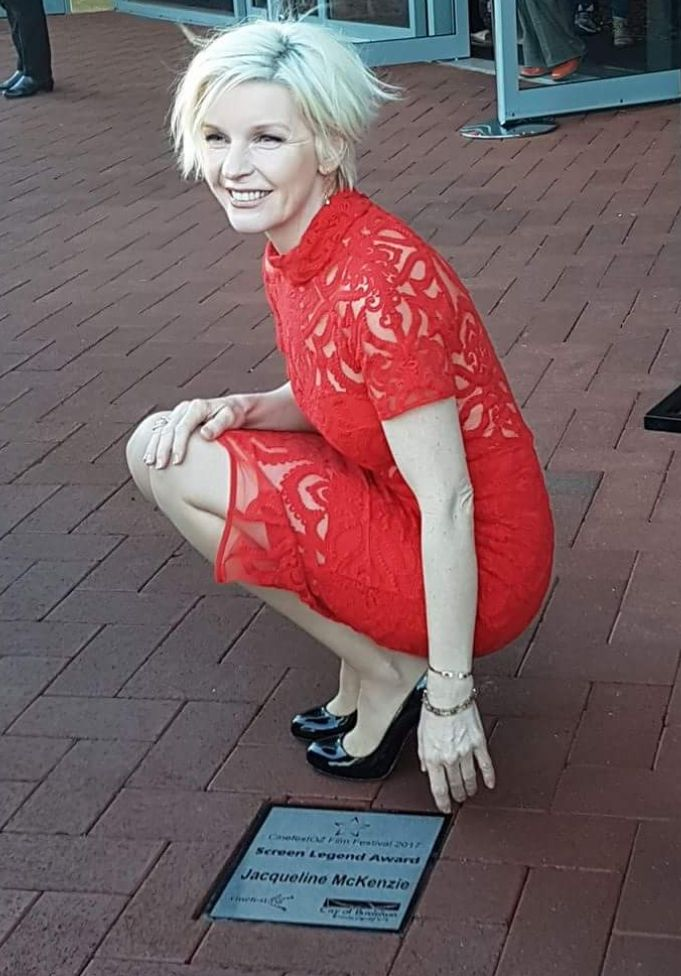
- McKenzie in 2017
- Born: 24 October 1967 (age 59); Sydney, New South Wales, Australia
- Other names: Jacqui McKenzie; Jac McKenzie
- Education: National Institute of Dramatic Art (BFA)
- Occupation: Actress
- Years active: 1987–present
- Children: Daughter

Jacqueline Susan McKenzie (born 24 October 1967) is an Australian film and stage actress.

== Early life and education ==
Jacqueline Susan McKenzie was born on 24 October 1967 in Sydney, New South Wales.

McKenzie attended Wenona School in North Sydney. In 1983, she moved to Pymble Ladies' College, where she graduated in 1985 with her Higher School Certificate. Known at school for her singing voice, McKenzie was cast as Nancy in Oliver! then in Godspell (both a co-production with Shore School) and later in Brigadoon (a co-production with Knox Grammar School), sharing the stage with Hugh Jackman, who was a student at Knox at the time.

McKenzie studied for a Bachelor of Arts degree at the University of New South Wales. While at university, she began modelling. working in both print and television media. She also took regular singing lessons with Australian vocal coach Bob Tasman-Smith. In 1987, McKenzie was cast as the lead in the pilot of television series All The Way alongside Ben Mendelsohn, Robert Mammone, Rowena Wallace, and Martin Sacks.

During this time, she came to the attention of casting agent Liz Mullinar, who had cast Judy Davis in My Brilliant Career and Nicole Kidman in Dead Calm. Following advice from Mullinar, McKenzie auditioned for the National Institute of Dramatic Art (NIDA) and was accepted. Opting out of both her arts degree and All The Way, McKenzie attended NIDA in 1988. She graduated in December 1990.

== Career ==
=== 1991 to 1995 ===
In 1991, McKenzie was awarded "Best Newcomer Award" from the Sydney Theatre Critics Circle, for her work in theatre productions Child Dancing (as Julie-Ann), The Master Builder (as Kaja), Twelfth Night (as Viola) and Rebecca (as Mrs de Winter). During rehearsals for Rebecca, director George Ogilvie allowed McKenzie time off to audition for a new Australian Independent feature film called Romper Stomper set to star Russell Crowe. She was cast in the film and went on to win Best Actress award at the Film Critics Circle of Australia.

Russell would later say "Jacqui's range as an actor disappears over the horizon. And I'm not sure it can actually be defined. When I first saw her, in the play Rebecca, I saw an actor whom I thought was blowing me on the skin from the inside. She is an actor who is both delicate and magical." In her "nothing short of stunning" film debut in Romper Stomper, McKenzie was described as "especially shining in her courage, truth and skill."

The role garnered her attention overseas, where she won Best Actress at the 1992 Stockholm International Film Festival for her "stark and non-sentimental portrayal of a young woman whose life has turned into a desperate chase for all she has lost: love, serenity, identity. Her character plays an essential part in creating the inexorable force and impact of the film." Over the next couple of years, she came to be regarded as one of Australia's most promising young actresses of stage and screen, showcasing a "phenomenal emotional range".

In 1994, McKenzie starred alongside David Wenham, Geoffrey Rush and Richard Roxburgh in Shakespeare's Hamlet, directed by Neil Armfield, for Belvoir St Theatre, Sydney. This sellout production was a critical, award-winning success with McKenzie's performance "so exquisitely pitched it could have shattered glass". "Jacqueline McKenzie's fragile Ophelia, dressed in cottontails and a tail-coat, turning the stage into a mind-state of shattered glass. Her presence awesomely palpable because of its sheer intangibility." The production went on to tour to Melbourne but McKenzie was unable to continue due to other work commitments. Cate Blanchett took over the role of Ophelia for the tour.

McKenzie's performance in Hamlet was followed by her role as Joan of Arc in Bernard Shaw's Saint Joan, directed by Gale Edwards for the Sydney Theatre Company at the Sydney Opera House. This was the first time Saint Joan had been staged in Australia since the Zoe Caldwell production in 1962. Regarded as one of "the most revealing tests of an actress", and as "the female Hamlet", Edwards' production was both a critical and box office sensation with McKenzie's performance unanimously acclaimed: "This play stands or falls on the performance of St Joan and McKenzie is simply superb." "McKenzie is a Joan to make the theatrical heavens rejoice and "Shaw himself would have been reluctantly impressed."

Described by head of NIDA, John Clarke, as "A chameleon" "one of the most talented actresses we have produced... she's an absolute dynamo, a powerhouse," McKenzie had fast earned a reputation as one of the most versatile actresses of her generation, taking on varied and often difficult roles. Equally adept in drama or comedy, she was described as the "Judy Davis of her generation (or funnily enough, the green eyed American actor Meg Ryan)"

In 1992, Ben Elton cast her as the lead role of "Rachel", the feisty environmentalist, in the television adaptation of his hit novel Stark. The mini-series was a BBC/ABC comedy, was directed by Nadia Tass and co-starred Ben Elton and Colin Friels. McKenzie received an Australian Film Institute Award nomination for Best Actress in a Miniseries for the role. In 1993, she scored a Best Actress in a Feature Film nomination for her comedic turn in the indie comedy, This Won't Hurt a Bit, playing Vanessa Presscott, a nerdy English ingénue with a speech impediment.

In 1994, McKenzie reunited with director George Ogilvie, who had directed her in Rebecca and Twelfth Night, to play the lead role of Dancy Smith in the adaptation of Kylie Tennant's famous depression-era drama The Battlers. The mini-series co-starred Gary Sweet and played on the Seven Network. McKenzie was nominated again for Best Actress in a TV Drama at the Australian Film Institute 1994 awards. In 1994, McKenzie was also nominated for Best Supporting Actress in the feature film Traps, directed by Pauline Chan. Playing the French girl living in Colonial Vietnam, McKenzie got to showcase her versatility by speaking in both French and Vietnamese for the role.

In 1995, McKenzie made Australian Film Institute history by winning the Beyond Best Actress in a Leading Role for Angel Baby and the Beyond Best Actress Award in a TV Drama for Halifax f.p.: Lies of the Mind. She won the Silver Logie for Most Outstanding Actress at the Logie Awards for her role in Halifax f.p. It was for playing the young lover Kate, opposite John Lynch's Harry in the Michael Rymer–helmed drama Angel Baby, that McKenzie received international acclaim.

The LA Weekly reviewed: "McKenzie is a find. Whether using answers on the Wheel of Fortune as a kind of daily horoscope, or cringing in terror as the upright legs of chairs in an empty restaurant seem to whisper at her, she is blazingly equal to the extremes of animal panic and hyperconscious insight that are the north and south of this movie's humane compass." Angel Baby also featured actress Deborra-Lee Furness and Colin Friels. In 1996, McKenzie was awarded Australian Star of the Year at the Australian Movie Convention.

=== 1996 to 2003 ===
McKenzie ventured to the US, where she starred in the films Deep Blue Sea (1999) directed by Renny Harlin with Samuel L. Jackson, Thomas Jane and Michael Rapaport; Divine Secrets of the Ya-Ya Sisterhood (2002) with Sandra Bullock, Ashley Judd, Ellen Burstyn, Kiersten Warren and James Garner; Freak Weather, with Aida Turturro and John Carroll Lynch; Love from Ground Zero with Simon Baker and Pruitt Taylor Vince, as well as tele-movie When Billie Beat Bobby, starring Holly Hunter and Ron Silver. She starred in the UK independent films Eisenstein with Simon McBurney and Kiss Kiss (Bang Bang) with Stellan Skarsgård, Chris Penn and Paul Bettany.

In March 2001, McKenzie was given a United States green card for "Person of Extraordinary Ability". She made her US theatre debut, starring as Rita in Willy Russell's Educating Rita, at the Williamstown Theatre Festival directed by Bruce Paltrow and co-starring Edward Herrmann. It was a huge success. "This production had the inexhaustible talents of Jacqueline McKenzie, an utterly charming and irrepressible Australian, whose cockney accent was spot on and characterization was full-cocked. Bursting onto the stage like a fire-engine responding to a five-alarm conflagration, McKenzie was a dynamo with enough energy to fill simultaneous performances of this and Pygmalion (a sure bet for her if the WTF wants to bring her back – and it should). Suffice to say, hers will surely be among the most memorable and reason enough to revive Rita."

She was cast as a lead in the US television pilot for ABC called MEDS (later MDs), directed by Michael Hoffman and starring John Hannah. She played Dockdaisy in the National Actors Theatre / Complicité co-production of The Resistible Rise of Arturo Ui, by Bertolt Brecht. Directed by Simon McBurney this cast included Al Pacino, Steve Buscemi, Chazz Palminteri, John Goodman, Paul Giamatti, Billy Crudup, Lothaire Bluteau, Linda Emond, Tony Randall and Charles Durning.

After this production, McKenzie returned to Australia to star as Catherine in the Pulitzer Prize Winning play Proof by David Auburn. Directed by George Ogilvie and starring Barry Otto, Christina Eliason, and Jonny Pasvolsky, this "tour de force from McKenzie" broke all previously held box office records at the Sydney Opera House, Drama Theatre.

Mckenzie followed the success of Proof by taking the lead role of Jude in the Australian feature film Peaches, starring Hugo Weaving and Emma Lung. Directed by Craig Monahan, the role garnered McKenzie a Best Actress Award from the Film Critics Circle of Australia with her performance described as a "revelation": "never more so than in the scene where she sings 'The Carnival Is Over' across a pub counter." From Peaches, McKenzie began work with Paul Cox (Man of Flowers, Innocence) in the feature film Human Touch starring as a young chorister estranged from her husband: "McKenzie makes Anna's sensual awakening both sensual and real".

=== 2004 to 2015 ===
In 2004, McKenzie made the switch to prime-time television in a role that catapulted her to international stardom. Cast as the lead female detective Diana Skouris in the US prime-time science fiction television series The 4400 from Executive Producer Francis Ford Coppola, McKenzie was cast alongside Joel Gretsch (Taken, Minority Report) – an onscreen partnership oft likened to Mulder and Scully. Directed by Yves Simoneau with show runner Ira Steven Behr (Star Trek: Deep Space Nine), The 4400 was the highest-rated debut on US cable for 2004, earning a Primetime Emmy Award nomination for Best Mini-Series. The show ran on the USA Network for four seasons, ending in 2007.

In 2006, McKenzie also starred as Linda Landry in "Umney's Last Case" opposite William H. Macy – the third episode of Nightmares and Dreamscapes on TNT.

In 2008, McKenzie starred as psychiatrist Veronica Hayden-Jones in the 13-part series Mental on the Fox Network, which was filmed at Fox Telecolombia in Bogotá, Colombia. Starring Annabella Sciorra, this was the first American television series to be filmed in Latin America for international markets. McKenzie guest starred in Desperate Housewives, Without a Trace, CSI: Miami, Hawaii 5-0 and the Australian TV series Rake. She was cast as Emma Waddell in the Jeremy Sims–directed feature film Beneath Hill 60 and starred in the 2010 season finale of NCIS: Los Angeles alongside former Deep Blue Sea castmate LL Cool J.

In 2011, Cate Blanchett and Andrew Upton, the co-artistic directors of the Sydney Theatre Company, invited McKenzie to star in their production of Sarah Ruhl's In the Next Room (or The Vibrator Play) at the Sydney Opera House, Drama Theatre. Co-starring Mandy McElhinney, this production went on tour to Melbourne Theatre Company, Wollongong, Canberra and Parramatta Riverside Theatre, earning McKenzie a Best Actress nomination at the Green Room Awards for her role as Mrs Givings. This was McKenzie's first play since her critically acclaimed turn as Catherine in David Auburn's Pulitzer Prize–winning play Proof, which sold out at the Sydney Opera House in 2003.

In 2012, she accepted Cate Blanchett and Andrew Upton's invitation to star in the Australian premiere of the two-hander Sex With Strangers by American playwright Laura Eason (House of Cards) for the Sydney Theatre Company. This critically acclaimed production co-starred Ryan Corr and was directed by Jocelyn Moorhouse. An award-winning director of many films including How to Make an American Quilt, this was Jocelyn's first play.

In 2013, McKenzie starred in the seminal role of Margaret (a.k.a. Maggie) in Cat on a Hot Tin Roof by Tennessee Williams for Belvoir St., directed by Simon Stone, co-starring Ewen Leslie (as Brick) and Marshall Napier (as Big Daddy). A sell-out production with an extension season at the Theatre Royal, Sydney, McKenzie's performance, in the role that made Elizabeth Taylor famous, was highly acclaimed: "Jacqueline McKenzie has far more scope in this play than she had in the recent Sex with Strangers to display her mesmerizing and neurasthenic talents that are so reminiscent of the early Judy Davis. She squirms, hops, skips and flops through the drama with a manic intensity that is breathtaking to watch from the first scene when she works her way through about a dozen changes of clothing and many pairs of 'hot' shoes during her long and intense opening monologue".

Writing in the Australian, John McCallum wrote "McKenzie has been playing some major roles in Sydney recently but here is a great one, finally worthy of her ability, and she rises to it magnificently. Her Maggie is full of feverish energy, and hard-won, hard-edged glamour that a woman who has clawed herself up out of poverty to become the wife of the descendant of a crass but very rich family might be expected to display. She is better than them. She is beautiful, her smile is always bright but brief glimpses of self-doubt betray her origins, and her eyes betray her desperation." "This is a good production, made great by McKenzie's beautiful performance."

In 2014, McKenzie returned to the Sydney Opera House to play Liza in Andrew Upton's adaptation of the Gorky classic Children of the Sun for the Sydney Theatre Company. Co-starring with Justine Clarke and Toby Truslove, under the direction of Kip Williams, the production was immensely successful, garnering McKenzie a nomination for Best Actress at the 2014 Sydney Theatre Awards.

In 2014, McKenzie reunited with her Romper Stomper co-star, Russell Crowe, to perform in his feature-film-directing debut, The Water Diviner, in which he also stars. With a handpicked cast that included Yılmaz Erdoğan, Olga Kurylenko, Ryan Corr, Jai Courtney, Steve Bastoni and Cem Yılmaz, The Water Diviner was nominated for eight AACTA awards including Best Supporting Actress in a feature film for McKenzie, who played the role of Russell's grieving wife Lizzie. For this performance, McKenzie won Best Supporting Actress at the 2014 Film Critics Circle of Australia Awards.

Films to be released: Force of Destiny, written and directed by Paul Cox and starring David Wenham and Shahana Goswami. This will premiere at the Melbourne International Film Festival; Fell, written and directed by Kasimir Burgess and starring Matt Nable and Daniel Henshall.

In 2015, McKenzie starred alongside Richard Roxburgh and Cate Blanchett in the Sydney Theatre Company production of The Present, by Anton Chekhov. Adapted by Andrew Upton, this production was directed by John Crowley. That production moved in 2016/17 to the Ethel Barrymore Theatre in Manhattan for the Broadway debut of McKenzie and the rest of the cast. She also starred as Orlando in the Sarah Ruhl play Orlando, based on the novel by Virginia Woolf (made famous by the 1992 film directed by Sally Potter and starring Tilda Swinton). Directed by Sarah Goodes, Orlando ran at the Sydney Opera House for the Sydney Theatre Company.

McKenzie was nominated for Best Actress in Orlando and Best Supporting Actress in The Present at the 2015 Sydney Theatre Awards.

=== 2016 to present ===
In 2016, McKenzie reunited with her former Stark! co-star Ben Elton for his romantic comedy Three Summers filming in Perth. The ensemble also featured Robert Sheean, Magda Szubanski, Michael Caton and Rebecca Breeds.

In August 2016, McKenzie filmed the independent movie Harmony in Wollongong and Sydney, Australia.

McKenzie starred as Jane Chandler in Australian feature film The Gateway in October 2016. Written by Michael White and directed by John Soto, the sci-fi film also starred Myles Pollard and Ben Mortley. The film follows the journey of a particle physicist who, grieving over the loss of her husband in a car crash, uses a revolutionary machine to bring him back with dire consequences for her family.

In May 2017, SBS announced that McKenzie had been cast in their new four-part drama Safe Harbour about a group of Australians who come across a boat of refugees whilst sailing on vacation. The mini-series, produced by Matchbox Pictures, also stars Phoebe Tonkin, Ewen Leslie and Joel Jackson.

In June 2017, McKenzie began filming Luke Sparke's movie Occupation with Charles Mesure, Temuera Morrison and Dan Ewing about a group of town residents banding together after a devastating ground invasion.

In August 2017, McKenzie started shooting the TV series Romper Stomper, a follow-up to the 1992 cult classic movie in which she starred with Russell Crowe. The series, conceived and directed by Geoffrey Wright (creator of the original film) and produced by John Edwards, premiered on Australian streaming platform Stan on New Years Day 2018, breaking all records for original content. The series was aired in the United Kingdom on the BBC later in 2018. For her role in the series McKenzie was awarded a Logie for Most Outstanding Supporting Actress at the Logie Awards of 2018.

At the CinefestOZ awards in August 2017, McKenzie was honoured with the Screen Legend Award, recognising her contribution and excellence in the film industry.

Starred alongside Sam Neill, Greta Scacchi and Bryan Brown in the movie Palm Beach (2019) . This was directed by Rachel Ward.

Reunited with friends from drama school, Essie Davis and Daniel Lapaine, on the hit film Miss Fisher and the Crypt of Tears (a spinoff of the series Miss Fisher Murder Mysteries)

2019 saw Jacqueline return to the Sydney Theatre Company to play Alice in Lucy Kirkwood's Mosquitoes (play) at the Sydney Opera House. In 2020, she starred in series 2 of the Stan original series Bloom alongside Jackie Weaver and Bryan Brown. She also reprised her award-winning role "Sharon Sinclair", from the series Halifax f.p., in the reboot Halifax: Retribution .

In 2021, McKenzie appeared with Annabelle Wallis in James Wan's horror film Malignant, and starred alongside Jane Seymour in Australia feature film Ruby's Choice.

== Music ==
McKenzie's hobbies include composing and recording music. Past collaborators include Vic Levak (Balligomingo) who co-wrote "Shy Baby" and Jim Hayden (Electrasy). When her 4400 co-star Joel Gretsch heard her song "Shy Baby", he took it to the producers of the show and as a result, it was used in the second-season finale "Mommy's Bosses" of The 4400. "Shy Baby" went on to be included in The 4400 soundtrack CD, released in April 2007.

== Art and painting ==
An avid painter (since working with Aaron Blabey on the Paul Cox film The Human Touch), McKenzie's paintings have appeared in several publications, including Venice Magazine and OK!.

In the Fox TV series Mental, her paintings became set dressing, adorning the walls of her character's office in the final episodes of the show.

== Personal life ==
In 1996, a portrait of McKenzie by Australian narrative painter Garry Shead was a finalist in the Archibald Prize and the Doug Moran National Portrait Prize.

McKenzie is a former partner of actor Simon McBurney.

She has a daughter Roxanne McKenzie, born 2009.

== Filmography ==
=== Film ===
Year	Title	Role	Type
1987	Wordplay	Pandora Imogene Lesley	Feature film
1992	Romper Stomper	Gabe	Feature film
1993	This Won't Hurt a Bit	Vanessa Prescott	Feature film
1994	Talk	The Girl	Feature film
1994	Traps	Viola	Feature film
1995	Roses Are Red	Joy	Film Short
1995	Angel Baby	Kate	Feature film
1996	Mr. Reliable	Beryl Muddle	Feature film aka My Entire Life
1997	A Cut in the Rates	Role unknown	Film Short
1997	Under the Lighthouse Dancing	Emma	Feature film
1998	Love from Ground Zero	Samantha	Feature film, US
1999	Deep Blue Sea	Janice Higgins	Feature film, US/Mexico
1999	Freak Weather	Penny	Feature film, US
2000	Eisenstein	Pera	Feature film, GERMANY/CANADA/Mexico
2001	Kiss Kiss (Bang Bang)	Sherry	Feature film, UK
2002	Divine Secrets of the Ya-Ya Sisterhood	Younger Teensy Whitman	Feature film, US
2003	Preservation	Daphne	Feature film
2004	Peaches	Jude	Feature film
2004	Human Touch	Anna	Feature film
2006	Opal Dream	Annie Williamson	Feature film
2010	Beneath Hill 60	Emma Waddell	Feature film
2014	Fell	Rachel	Feature film
2014	The Water Diviner	Eliza Connor	Feature film
2015	Force of Destiny	Hannah	Feature film
2017	Don't Tell	Jean Dalton	Feature film
2017	Three Summers	Prof. Wellborn	Feature film
2018	The Gateway	Jane Chandler	Feature film
2018	Occupation	Colonel Grant	Feature film
2018	Harmony	Beth Miller	Feature film
2019	Palm Beach	Bridget	Feature film
2019	Miss Fisher and the Crypt of Tears	Lady Eleanor Lofthouse	Feature film
2021	Malignant	Dr. Florence Weaver	Feature film
2021	Ruby's Choice	Sharon	Feature film
2022	Poker Face	Dr. Shaw	Feature film
2023	The Convert	Charlotte	Feature film
2024	Force of Nature: The Dry 2	Carmen Cooper	Feature film

=== Television ===
Year	Title	Role	Type
1987	The Riddle of the Stinson	Usherelle	TV film
1988	All the Way	Regular role: Penelope Seymour	TV miniseries, 3 episodes
1992	A Country Practice	Meredith Hendrix	TV series, 2 episodes: "Riding For A Fall": Parts 1 & 2"
1993	Stark	Regular lead role: Rachel	ABC TV miniseries, 3 episodes
1994	The Battlers	Regular lead role: Dancy Smith	TV miniseries, 2 episodes
1995	Halifax f.p. – Lies of the Mind	Lead role: Sharon Sinclair	TV film series, 1 episode 6: "Lies Of The Mind"
1997	Kangaroo Palace	Regular lead role: Catherine Macaleese	TV miniseries, 2 episodes
1997	The Devil Game	Lead role: Frankie Smith	TV film
2000	On the Beach	Recurring role: Mary Davidson Holmes	TV miniseries, 2 episodes
2001	When Billie Beat Bobby	Margaret Court	TV film, CANADA/US
2004–2007	The 4400	Lead role: Diana Skouris	TV series UK/US, 44 episodes
2006	Nightmares & Dreamscapes: From the Stories of Stephen King	Linda Landry / Gloria Demmick	TV miniseries US/AUSTRALIA, 1 episode: "Umney's Last Case"
2006	Two Twisted	Sarah Carmody	TV film series 1 episode: "Saviour"
2007	Without a Trace	Guest role: Patricia Mills	TV series US, 1 episode: "Deep Water"
2008	Stupid, Stupid Man	Guest role: Jane	ABC TV series, 1 episode: "Morale"
2009	Mental	Lead role: Dr. Veronica Hayden-Jones	TV series US/CANADA/Columbia, 13 episodes
2010	NCIS: Los Angeles	Guest role: Amy Taylor	TV series US, 1 episode: "Callen, G"
2010	Hawaii Five-0	Guest role: Sarah Reeves	TV series US, 1 episode: "Nalowale"
2012	Desperate Housewives	Alexandra	TV series US, 1 episode: "Who Can Say What's True?"
2012	CSI: Miami	Guest role: Meredith Ramsay	TV series US, 1 episode: "Terminal Velocity"
2012	Rake	Guest role: Alannah Alford	ABC TV series, 1 Episode: "R vs Alford"
2015	Hiding	Regular lead role: Ferdine Lamay	ABC TV series, 8 episodes
2015	Love Child	Recurring Guest role: Mrs. Maguire	TV series, 2 episodes: "2.1", "2.2"
2018	Romper Stomper	Gabrielle 'Gabe' Jordan	TV miniseries, 6 episodes
2018	Safe Harbour	Helen	SBS TV miniseries, 4 episodes
2018	Pine Gap	Kath Sinclair	ABC TV miniseries, 6 episodes
2019–2020	Reckoning	Recurring role: Linda Swan	TV miniseries, 3 episodes
2020	Bloom	Regular role: Anne Carter	TV series, season 2, 6 episodes
2020	Halifax: Retribution	Guest role: Sharon Sinclair	TV miniseries, 1 episode
2021	Alantown	Lead role: Mary Magdalene	TV series, 1 episode
2022	Savage River	Recurring role: Colleen	ABC TV series, 6 episodes
2022	Significant Others	Recurring role: Sarah	ABC TV series, 6 episodes
2024	My Life Is Murder	Iris	TV Series NZ, Season 4, 2 episodes
2024	Mix Tape	Sheila	TV Series, UK/Australia
2025	All Her Fault	Louise Erikson	TV miniseries, USA/Australia, 2 episodes

=== Self appearances / interviews ===
Year	Title	Role	Notes
2024	News Breakfast	Guest – Herself & Deborra-Lee Furness ('Force of Nature: The Dry 2') Melbourne film premiere	ABC TV series, 1 episode
2024	The Project	Guest – Herself & Deborra-Lee Furness ('Force of Nature: The Dry 2') Sydney film premiere	TV series, 1 episode
2022	12th AACTA Awards	Herself – Presenter	TV special
2020	10th AACTA Awards	Herself	TV special
2019	The Living Room	Herself – Guest	TV series, 1 episode
2019	Studio 10	Herself with Rachel Ward & Heather Mitchell	TV series, 1 episode
2006–2009	20 to 1	Herself	TV series, 6 episodes
1999	The Movie Show	Herself	SBS TV series, 1 episode
1999	Today Tonight	Herself	TV series, 1 episode
1999	Hey Hey It's Saturday	Herself – Guest	TV series, 1 episode
1999–2001	The Panel	Herself – Guest	TV series, 3 episodes

== Theatre ==
Oliver! as Nancy, school production

- 1991: Child Dancing as Julie-Ann, Griffin Theatre Company, dir. Michael Gow
- 1991: Twelfth Night as Viola, dir. George Ogilvie, Q Theatre Penrith
- 1991: The Master Builder as Kaja Fosli, Belvoir, dir. Neil Armfield
- 1991: Rebecca as Mrs de Winter, Marian Street Theatre, dir. George Ogilvie
- 1992: The Barber of Seville as Rosine, Marian Street Theatre, dir. Peter Kingston
- 1992: Vassa (Maxim Gorky) (as Natalia, NIDA, dir. John Clarke
- 1994: Hamlet as Ophelia, Company B (Sydney) and Playhouse (Melbourne), dir. Neil Armfield, with Geoffrey Rush, David Wenham, Richard Roxburgh, Gillian Jones
- 1995: Saint Joan as Joan, Sydney Theatre Company, Sydney Opera House dir. Gale Edwards
- 1997: The Governor's Family as Lara Mountgarrett, Belvoir, dir. Neil Armfield
- 2000: The White Devil as Isabella, Sydney Theatre Company and Brooklyn Academy of Music (2001), dir. Gale Edwards, with Angie Milliken, Marcus Graham, Jeremy Sims, Julia Blake, Bruce Spence, Hugo Weaving, Philip Quast, Paula Arundell
- 2001: Educating Rita as Rita, Williamstown Theatre Festival, dir. Bruce Paltrow, with Edward Herrmann
- 2002:The Resistible Rise of Arturo Ui as Dock Daisy, Schimmel Center (New York), Complicité, dir. Simon McBurney, with Al Pacino, Steve Buscemi, John Goodman, Billy Crudup Paul Giamatti, Tony Randall, Charles Durning, Linda Emond, Chazz Palminteri, Dominic Chianese, Lothaire Bluteau
- 2003: Proof as Catherine, by David Auburn, Sydney Opera House dir. George Ogilvie, with Barry Otto
- 2011: In the Next Room (or The Vibrator Play) by Sarah Ruhl, as Catherine Givings, Sydney Opera House and Melbourne Theatre Company, dir. Pamela Rabe
- 2012: Sex With Strangers as Olivia, by Laura Eason, Sydney Theatre Company, dir. Jocelyn Moorhouse
- 2013: Cat on a Hot Tin Roof as Maggie by Tennessee Williams, Belvoir, dir. Simon Stone
- 2014: Children of the Sun by Maxim Gorky as Liza, dir: Kip Williams adapted by Andrew Upton, Sydney Theatre Company, Sydney Opera House
- 2015: The Present by Anton Chekhov as Sophia, adapted by Andrew Upton, Sydney Theatre Company dir. John Crowley; at the Sydney Theatre
- 2015: Orlando as Orlando, adapted from Virginia Woolf's Orlando: A Biography by Sarah Ruhl, Sydney Theatre Company, at the Sydney Opera House
- 2016: The Present by Anton Chekhov as Sophia, adapted by Andrew Upton, Sydney Theatre Company dir. John Crowley for Broadway run at the Ethel Barrymore Theatre in Manhattan
- 2019: Mosquitoes by Lucy Kirkwood as Alice. Dir: Jessica Arthur for Sydney Theatre Company at the Sydney Opera House

== Awards and nominations ==
Year	Award	Category	Nominated work	Result
1991	Australian Theatre Critics award	Best Newcomer	Various	Won
1992	Stockholm International Film Festival	Best Actress	Romper Stomper	Won
1992	Film Critics Circle of Australia	Best Actress, Film	Romper Stomper	Won
1993	Australian Film Institute Award	Best Actress, Film	This Won't Hurt a Bit	Nominated
1993	Australian Film Institute Award	Best Actress, Television	Stark!	Nominated
1994	Australian Film Institute Award	Best Supporting Actress, Film	Traps	Nominated
1994	Film Critics Circle of Australia	Best Supporting Actress, Film	Traps	Nominated
1994	Australian Film Institute Award	Best Actress, Television	The Battlers	Nominated
1995	Australian Film Institute Award	Best Actress, Television	Halifax f.p. "Lies of the Mind"	Won
1995	Australian Film Institute Award	Best Actress, Film	Angel Baby	Won
1995	Film Critics Circle of Australia	Best Actress, Film	Angel Baby	Won
1995	Grand Prix Festival du Valenciennes	Best Actress, Film	Angel Baby	Won
1995	Norman Kessel Memorial Glugs Award	Best Actress, Theatre	Hamlet	Won
1995	Logie Awards	Best Actress, Television	Halifax f.p. "Lies of the Mind"	Won
1995	Australian International Movie Convention	Australian Star of the Year	Various (Career Award)	Won
1998	Audio Book Awards, Australia	Best Narration	Picnic at Hanging Rock	Won
2001	Australian Film Institute Award	Best Miniseries	On The Beach	Won
2001	Golden Globe	Best Miniseries	On The Beach	Nominated
2005	Film Critics Circle of Australia	Best Actress, Film	Peaches	Nominated
2005	Primetime Emmy	Best Miniseries	The 4400	Nominated
2011	Green Room Award	Best Actress, Theatre	In The Next Room or The Vibrator Play	Nominated
2014	Sydney Theatre Awards	Best Actress, Theatre	Children of the Sun	Nominated
2014	AACTA Awards	Best Supporting Actress	The Water Diviner	Nominated
2014	Film Critics Circle of Australia	Best Supporting Actress	The Water Diviner	Won
2015	Sydney Theatre Awards	Best Supporting Actress	The Present	Nominated
2015	Sydney Theatre Awards	Best Actress	Orlando	Nominated
2015	Equity Ensemble Awards	Best Ensemble	Hiding	Nominated
2017	CinefestOz Film Festival	Screen Legend Award	Career Award	Won
2017	AACTA Awards	Best Supporting Actress	Don't Tell	Nominated
2018	Film Critics Circle of Australia	Best Supporting Actress	Don't Tell	Nominated
2018	Logie Awards	Most Outstanding Supporting Actress, Miniseries	Romper Stomper (TV series)	Won
2019	Oz Flix Independent Film Awards	Best Actress	The Gateway	Nominated
2020	AACTA Awards	Best Supporting Actress	Bloom	Nominated
2022	AACTA Awards	Best Supporting Actress	Savage River	Nominated
