= LAAFTA =

Australians in Film (formally Los Angeles Australian Film and Television Association, LAAFTA) was founded in May 2001 to provide a forum and meeting place for film and television industry professionals to view Australian films. Australians in Film's mission is to celebrate outstanding Australian filmmakers and performers in the United States while inspiring, uniting and developing the next generation.

== Goals ==
1. Celebrate and promote the work of Australian film and television makers.
2. Create a Los Angeles-based networking forum for professionals working in the film, television and allied industries who are Australian or who have a close association with Australia.
3. Increase the visibility of the Los Angeles-based Australian film and television community.
4. Provide a vehicle for raising the profile of Australian film and television productions.

== Ambassadors ==
A powerful coalition of Australian directors and actors have allied to promote Australian films and talent in Hollywood. Nicole Kidman, one of Australians in Film ambassadors said, "Everyone knows how tough a struggle it can be to make it in Hollywood and, as an Australian, I'm very appreciative of the fact that Australians in Film not only showcases the work of those of us who have enjoyed some success, but also the work of up and coming talent from our country."

Other Australian ambassadors include Mel Gibson, Russell Crowe, Naomi Watts, Geoffrey Rush, Cate Blanchett, Hugh Jackman, Phillip Noyce, Heath Ledger, Eric Bana, Anthony LaPaglia, Gillian Armstrong, Simon Baker, Toni Collette, Deborra-Lee Furness, Melissa George, Scott Hicks, Barry Humphries, Julian McMahon, Jacqueline McKenzie, Kylie Minogue, Radha Mitchell, Poppy Montgomery, Olivia Newton-John, Frances O'Connor, Miranda Otto, Guy Pearce, Fred Schepisi, Hugo Weaving, David Wenham and Sarah Wynter.
