= George Assang =

Australian singer and actor (1927–1997)

- Also known as: Vic Sabrino
- Born: 1927; Thursday Island, Queensland, Australia
- Died: 1997 (aged 69–70) Nowra, New South Wales, Australia
- Genres: Jazz; blues
- Occupations: Singer; actor
- Instrument: Vocals
- Spouse: Rowena Wallace (m. 1973; div. 1974)

George Assang (1927–1997), also known by his stage name Vic Sabrino, was an Australian jazz and blues singer and actor from Thursday Island, Queensland, Australia. He performed under his own name and the stage name Vic Sabrino. Assang was of Aboriginal, Pacific Islander and Asian descent.

Assang was briefly married to actress Rowena Wallace in 1973 (this being his third marriage); they divorced the following year.

== Music career ==
As Vic Sabrino, he may have made the first Australian rock and roll recording, with "Rock Around the Clock"; whether he also recorded it before or after American Bill Haley, for whom the song is best known, has never been established. A single he recorded with French jazz artist Red Perksey (born Siegbert Perlstein in Berlin, Germany; 1921–1995; known professionally as Robert Bernard "Red" Perksey – a jazz trumpeter, pianist, singer, composer, music director, orchestra leader and A and R) and His orchestra included this recording as a B-side. His version of the song has been described as having a distinct difference from Haley's more rock sounding recording, and is said to more closely resemble a jazz-swing style in the vein of Dean Martin.

This single may have been recorded in 1955, some three years before Johnny O'Keefe's recording of "Wild One" in 1958.

== Filmography ==
=== Television ===
- Vic Sabrino Sings (1958)
- Skippy the bush Kangaroo (1968)
- Hunter (1968)
- Barrier Reef (1971–1972)
- Spyforce (1971)
- Boney (1972)
- Number 96 (1974)

=== Film ===
- The Intruders (1969)
- And Millions Will Die (1973)
- Dot and the Kangaroo (1977)

== Discography ==
=== George Assang ===
with Trevor Jones' Orchestra

- "Daughter of Mona Lisa" (1955) Mercury

=== George and Ken Assang ===
- Just A Closer Walk (1965) Philips
- "Songs From Down Under" – The Colonials (1967) Phillips PD 200

=== Vic Sabrino ===
- "Dust in the Sun / Who Needs You" Festival

with Red Perksey & His Orchestra and Sheila Sewell

- "The End of the Affair/Drifting Along" Pacific AUS #19

with Red Perksey & His Orchestra

- "The Magic of Love/(We're gonna) Rock Around the Clock" (1955) Pacific
- "Merry-go-round/Time For Parting" (1955) Pacific
- "Blue Suede Shoes/Heartbreak Hotel" (1956) Pacific

with Dave Owens and his Blue Boys with The Blue Notes

- "Long, Long Lane/Painted Doll" (1957) Festival

with Gus Merzi's Orchestra and with Harry Willis Orchestra; and The Belltones & Iris Mason Singers

- "Fraulein/Hitch-Hiking Heart" (1957) Festival

with Graeme Bell and his Skiffle band

- "Sweet Georgia Brown/ Freight Train" (1957) Columbia
- "John Henry/Don't You Rock Me, Daddy-O" (1957) Columbia
- "The Gospel Train/Come Skiffle Chicken" (1957) Columbia
- "Gamblin' Man/Skiffle Board Blues" (1957) Columbia
