= Glass Babies =

- Genre: Mini-Series
- Based on: concept by Russell Scott
- Written by: Greg Millin; Graeme Farmer
- Directed by: Brendan Maher
- Starring: Rowena Wallace; Gary Day
- Theme music composer: David Skinner
- Country of origin: Australia
- Original language: English
- No. of episodes: 2 x 90 mins

Production
- Producer: Peter Herbert
- Cinematography: Ellery Ryan
- Editor: Cliff Hayes
- Running time: 90 mins
- Production company: PBL Productions

Original release
- Network: Channel 9
- Release: 22 April – 24 April 1985

Glass Babies is a 1985 Australian television mini series about a ruthless family set in the world of the then-new technology of in-vitro fertilization.

== Cast ==
- Rowena Wallace as Dr. Gloria McCrae
- Gary Day as Brendan Keller
- Deborra-Lee Furness as Joan Simpson
- Asher Keddie as Anna Simpson
- George Mikell as John Craig
- Belinda Davey as Sally Craig
- Andrew Sharp as Michael Craig
- Ian McFadyen as Dr B Bombar

== Home media ==
Title	Format	Ep #	Discs	Region 4 (Australia)	Special features	Distributors
Glass Babies (Complete Series)	DVD	2	2	7 May 2014	None	Umbrella Entertainment
Glass Babies (Complete Series)	Streaming	2	-	7 May 2014	None	Umbrella Entertainment
