= UAA Films =

Australian production and finance company

United American and Australasian Films is an Australian production and finance company that flourished during the 10BA era.

It was established in Perth by John Picton-Warlow and David Thomas in 1979. it was known for raising Australian tax money and investing it in overseas production. It also invested in a number of Australian movies.

In 1982 they announced they would build a film studio in Canberra. However this never happened.

The company was controversial at the time because of its belief in "international" films.

The company went into liquidation in 1994.

== Select Credits ==
- Arthur (1981) - invested $1.5 million
- So Fine
- Deathtrap
- The Thorn Birds
- Superman III
- Prisoners (1983)
- Razorback (1984)
- Frog Dreaming (1985)
- Emoh Ruo (1985)
- The Right Hand Man (1986)
- For Love Alone (1986)
- Shame (1988)
- National Lampoon's Vacation (1983)

== See also ==
- List of film production companies
- List of television production companies
