= Shame (1988 film) =

- US film poster
- Directed by: Steve Jodrell
- Written by: Beverly Blankenship; Michael Brindley
- Produced by: Damien Parer; Paul D. Barron
- Starring: Deborra-Lee Furness; Tony Barry; Simone Buchanan; Gillian Jones
- Cinematography: Joseph Pickering
- Edited by: Kerry Regan
- Music by: Mario Millo
- Production companies: Barron Films; UAA Films
- Distributed by: Hoyts Distribution
- Release date: February 26, 1988
- Running time: 94 minutes
- Country: Australia
- Language: English
- Budget: A$1.65 million

Shame is a 1988 Australian drama film directed by Steve Jodrell and written by Beverly Blankenship and Michael Brindley.

Deborra-Lee Furness stars as Asta Cadell, a barrister from Perth on a solo motorcycle trip through the Australian countryside. When her bike is damaged, she is forced to stay in a rural town while waiting for replacement parts. While there, she learns of the unsettling nature of the town, where the residents turn a blind eye to the young men's constant harassment and sexual assault of the town's young women.

== Plot ==
After her motorbike breaks down during a lone tour of outback Western Australia, vacationing barrister Asta Cadell is forced to stay in the small fictitious township of Ginborak while she waits for replacement parts.

On arriving in the town, she immediately receives catcalls and sexually suggestive comments from many of the town's men. The town's sergeant, Wal Cuddy, dismisses her concerns and suggests that she not stay in the town long.

Cadell arrives at the home and shop of the local mechanic, Tim Curtis, and though originally dismissed by the Curtis' apprentice, is allowed to borrow the mechanics' tools to work on her bike. Cadell asks him to allow her to stay in his guest house while she waits for the parts to arrive and he assents, rejecting her offer of money. The room is set out for her by Curtis' short tempered mother, Norma, and Cadell is lying down to sleep when Curtis' wife arrives home with her daughter Lizzie who is visibly shaken.

Later that night, Curtis and his wife exit their house mid fight, and Lizzie runs off into the night, crying. Cadell finds and comforts the young girl.

Cadell's assertive personality brings her into conflict with the bullying female owner of a meat-processing factory and with the ruthless group of young men who have gang-raped several girls in the town. The youths turn their unpleasant attentions to her, from which she vigorously defends herself, inflicting injuries on some of the boys. She complains to the police sergeant, who explains that the boys are simply having fun, and threatens Cadell with an assault charge, at which she reveals she is a barrister and not an easy target for his corrupt behaviour. She begins to speak more openly and energetically, in public and private, about the scandalous affairs which she has learned are occurring in this isolated town.

She becomes a role-model and source of strength to the violated and injusticed Lizzie, whose own father even struggles to deny the truth of what has happened under his very nose. Championed on by Cadell, little by little, Lizzie draws upon enough courage to begin both straying further from the safety of her own house, and confronting her own father about his denial.

But even her own house and family become targets for the blind rage which erupts when the young violators and their complacent parents learn that Cadell and Lizzie mean business—they are intent on pressing charges to get the boys imprisoned.

The women of the town come together as they fight back against the rapists. Unfortunately it is all too late for Lizze. As she hides in the police station while the town fights the drunken lads attacking the Curtis household, two of the boys find her. Despite screams of help she is whisked away in their car. Lizzie tries to escape only to be thrown onto the road and killed. In the final scene the town of Ginaborak stands in silence as her body is placed in the back of a truck.

== Cast ==
- Deborra-Lee Furness as Asta Cadell
- Tony Barry as Tim Curtis
- Simone Buchanan as Lizzie Curtis
- Gillian Jones as Tina Farrel
- Allison Taylor as Penny
- David Franklin as Danny Fiske
- Peter Aanensen as Sgt. Wal Cuddy
- Margaret Ford as Norma Curtis

== Production ==
Beverley Blankenship saw Mad Max and became excited about the idea of writing a film about a woman on a motorcycle. She discussed it with Michael Brindley and decided to make a modern-day Western. Blankenship wrote an eleven-page treatment which got finance from the Women's Film Fund for a first draft. They offered the script to Joan Long who was busy on other projects but then Paul Barron read a draft and became enthusiastic. Steve Jodrell became attached as director. Jodrell:

No-one really wanted to touch it because they couldn't work out what it was about. It was not quite entertaining; it was a little bit too art-house; it was a message film, and yet Michael and Beverly Blenkinship had always designed the film as a kind of B grade drive-in movie. They did not want it to end up in an art-house circuit. They wanted it to be an action flick that had some things to say in it, so that they get to the kind of demographic that they were appealing to, which was young teenagers and people in their twenties - and actually hoping the girls would drag the men along and, therefore, get across what they wanted to say.

Jodrell says that three weeks prior to shooting, the financiers had commissioned a new draft to be written, in which Asta was far more violent and vigilante-like. However it was not used.

The movie was shot over six weeks on location at Toodyay in Western Australia on Super 16mm.

== Release ==
Shame was released on February 26, 1988, in Perth and received a video release on March 22, 1989.

Jodrell says the financiers were not supportive of the final film but Paul Barron managed to find investors to buy out their interests, enabling the movie to be theatrically released.

Between 1988 and 1992, the film appeared at several film festivals including Vancouver International Film Festival (1988), Uppsala International Short Film Festival (1988), Seattle International Film Festival (1988), Santa Barbara International Film Festival (1988), New Directors/New Films Festival in New York (1988), London Film Festival (1988), Houston International Film Festival (1988), Hof International Film Festival (1988), Edinburgh International Film Festival (1988), Cork Film Festival (1988), Chicago International Film Festival (1988), International Film Festival Of India (1989), Hong Kong International Film Festival (1989), an event featuring Australia at Centre Georges Pompidou in Paris (1991), Verona Film Festival (1992), and Strictly Oz – A History of Australian Film (1995).

The film was remade for TV in USA in 1992 starring English actress Amanda Donohoe. The role of Asta Cadell was developed further and portrayed by Claudia Karvan in the Australian telemovie Natural Justice: Heat (1996).

National Film and Sound Archive of Australia (NFSA) announced in 2017 that it would release a digitally restored version of Shame as part of its NFSA Restores initiative, which would be premiered at the 2017 Melbourne International Film Festival. In response to the restoration, director Steve Jordell quoted, "It has an immaculate freshness and luminosity that reminds me of its initial screening almost 30 years ago. There’s a powerful message in the film – sadly, one that is even more relevant today than when it was first released."

== Home media ==
Shame was released on DVD by Umbrella Entertainment in May 2011. The DVD is compatible with all region codes and includes special features such as the original theatrical trailer, interviews with Steve Jodrell, Simone Buchanan and Michael Brindley, and an interview with Deborra-Lee Furness. In 2021, Umbrella released a Blu-ray edition of Shame with further extra features, including two feature-length audio commentaries.

== Awards ==
Due to an administrative error, Shame was made ineligible for the 1988 Australian Film Institute awards.

Award	Category	Subject	Result	Reference
Film Critics Circle of Australia	Best Screenplay	Beverley Blankenship, Michael Brindley	Won	
Film Critics Circle of Australia	Best Actor - Female	Deborra-Lee Furness	Won	
Seattle International Film Festival	Best Actress	Deborra-Lee Furness	Won	

== See also ==
- Cinema of Australia
