= All the Way (TV series) =

- Starring: Rowena Wallace; Diana Davidson; Maggie Millar; Dannii Minogue
- Country of origin: Australia
- Original language: English
- No. of seasons: 1
- No. of episodes: 32

Production
- Producer: Bill Hughes
- Running time: 60 mins

Original release
- Network: Nine Network
- Release: 20 April 1988 – 1988

All the Way is an Australian television series made by Crawford Productions for the Nine Network in 1988.

The series was set in the 1960s. The first episode took place on the date of the John F. Kennedy assassination. The series examined the life of an Australian family during the decade of Lyndon B. Johnson, the Vietnam War, civil rights activism and The Beatles, linked by three sisters (played by Diana Davidson, Maggie Millar and Rowena Wallace).

A young Dannii Minogue was cast as Penny Seymour for the TV series as a replacement for Jacqueline McKenzie who had originally played Penny in the 3 part TV miniseries April 1988. All the Way debuted as a three-part TV mini-series during April 1988 and the TV series followed that November 1988 though due to cricket telecasts the series was dropped from its regular ratings schedule of 8.30pm Tuesday night and was screened at various later time slots usually in a one or two hour bracket.

A follow-on series screened out of ratings period starting in November 1988. It failed to catch on with audiences and was cancelled after 32 episodes.

== Cast ==
=== Main / regular ===
- Peter Sumner as Phillip Seymour
- Rowena Wallace as Elaine Seymour
- Ben Mendelsohn as Lindsay Seymour
- Jacqueline McKenzie as Penny Seymour (TV miniseries)
- Dannii Minogue as Penny Seymour (TV series)
- Maggie Millar as Lorna Scott
- Dennis Miller as Ray Scott
- Lisa Hensley as Christine Scott
- Dominic McDonald as Barry Scott
- Vince Colosimo as Joe Bianchi
- Martin Sacks as Alan Scott
- Joy Smithers as Gillian Porter (TV miniseries)
- Nikki Coghill as Terry O'Rourke (TV series)
- Diana Davidson as Madeleine
- Grigor Taylor as Mike O'Brien (TV miniseries)
- George Mallaby as George Cutler (TV series)

=== Supporting / guests ===
- Brenda Addie as Mrs. Birch
- Billie Hammerberg
- Bruce Atkins
- Kim Beissel as Medical student
- Ralph Cotterill as Mr. Bower
- Joe Dolce as Franco
- Brenton Foale as Journalist
- Stephen Hall as Richard Dodds
- Marion Heathfield as Mrs. Hart
- Jim Howes as Professor Thompson
- John Lee as Sir Peter Edwin
- Lloyd Cunnington
- Rebecca Rigg
- Jeremy Shadlow
- Tottie Goldsmith
- Robert Mammone as Mr. Bianchi
- Martin Redpath as Dr. Hart
- Marie Redshaw as Miss McKinnon
- Wynn Roberts as Maynard
- Tim Burns as Student
- Nadine Garner

== Reception ==
The Age called it "awful".
