= Pro Jank Footy =

2026 video game

- Developers: Powerbomb Games; Tinker Town
- Publishers: Powerbomb Games; Umbrella Games
- Composer: Dario Russo
- Platforms: PlayStation 5, Xbox Series X|S, Nintendo Switch 2, Nintendo Switch, Microsoft Windows
- Release: 12 August 2026
- Genre: Arcade roguelike
- Mode: Co-op mode; multiplayer; player versus player; single-player; shared/splitscreen multiplayer

Pro Jank Footy is a 2026 arcade roguelike sports game developed by Australian studios Powerbomb Games and Tinker Town. The game is published by Powerbomb Games and Umbrella Games.

== Gameplay ==
The game is an arcade-style Australian rules football game that features comedic and roguelike twists to the arcade sports genre.

The game features two teams of 18 and over 150 power-ups that alter gameplay. The game is playable in local multiplayer or a single-player season mode.

== Development ==
In July 2026, developer Powerbomb Games announced that Pro Jank Footy will launch on 12 August. The developers Powerbomb and Tinker Town are based in Adelaide, Australia. Australian animator Michael Cusack produced the launch trailer to mark the game's release date announcement. Powerbomb Games' creative director is David Ashby. Ashby previously co-created the comedy series Danger 5.

Pro Jank Footy is backed by film distributor Umbrella Entertainment, marking its foray into gaming. The game is a recipient of South Australian Film Corporation funding to increase the number of locally made video games.

The game takes inspiration from arcade sports classics like NBA Jam and NHL '94. Broden Kelly of Australian sketch group Aunty Donna provides the in-game commentary.

== Release ==
The game launched simultaneously on PC, PlayStation 5, Nintendo Switch and Nintendo Switch 2, and Xbox Series X and Series S on 12 August 2026.

== Reception ==
Reception

Aggregate scores
Aggregator	Score
Metacritic	(PC) 76/100
OpenCritic	30% recommend

The PC version of Pro Jank Footy received generally favorable reviews from critics, according to the review aggregation website Metacritic. Fellow review aggregator OpenCritic assessed that the game received fair approval, being recommended by 30% of critics.
