= Freak Weather =

- Directed by: Mary Kuryla
- Written by: Mary Kuryla
- Based on: Freak Weather by Mary Kuryla
- Produced by: Andrea Sperling; Alexis Magnagni-Seely
- Starring: Jacqueline McKenzie; Jacob Chase; Aida Turturro
- Cinematography: Arturo Smith
- Edited by: Joe D’Augustine; Gail Yasunaga
- Music by: Joe Gore
- Release date: September 17, 1999 (Toronto)
- Running time: 84 minutes 87 minutes
- Country: United States
- Language: English

Freak Weather is a 1999 American drama film directed by Mary Kuryla and starring Jacqueline McKenzie, Jacob Chase and Aida Turturro. It based on Kuryla's short story of the same name.

== Plot ==
Penny, an unstable woman, is thrown out of her home by her abusive boyfriend Jimmi and spends the next 48 hours traveling around Los Angeles in her truck with her son to try and set things right.

== Cast ==
- Jacqueline McKenzie as Penny
- Aida Turturro as Glory
- John Carroll Lynch as Ed
- Jacob Chase as Albert
- James Ent as Jimmi
- Justin Pierce as Pizza Guy
- John Heard as David

== Reception ==
Eddie Cockrell of Variety gave the film a mixed review and wrote, "Buried in ambitious intentions, Freak Weather is an audacious yet distasteful debacle that squanders terrific Aussie thesp Jacqueline McKenzie (Romper Stomper, Deep Blue Sea) as an abused g.f. who debases herself in a vain attempt to please her offscreen paramour."

Noel Murray of The A.V. Club gave the film a negative review and wrote, "The movie starts out comically bizarre and becomes pointlessly violent, driven by behavior and characters so far outside the norm that they're useful only as metaphors for abandonment. Freak Weather also suffers from an overbearing heavy-metal score, and too many name actors in small roles."

Dana Stevens of The New York Times wrote, "Ms. Kuryla's determination to present an unvarnished portrait of an often unlikable woman makes "Freak Weather," which opens today at the Two Boots Pioneer Theater, an unusually accomplished if imperfect debut."
