= Love from Ground Zero =

1998 American film by Stephen Grynberg

- Directed by: Stephen Grynberg
- Written by: Stephen Grynberg
- Produced by: Aaron Cohen; Stephen Grynberg; Patricia Kruijer
- Starring: Simon Baker; Jacqueline McKenzie; Pruitt Taylor Vince; Kathryn Erbe; James Gammon
- Cinematography: Mauro Fiore
- Edited by: Affonso Gonçalves; Melody London
- Music by: John McEuen
- Production companies: Sandbox Films; Scenic Overlook
- Release date: October 1998 (HIFF, USA)
- Running time: 96 minutes
- Country: United States
- Language: English

Love from Ground Zero is a 1998 American dramatic road movie directed, written and produced by Stephen Grynberg. It stars Simon Baker, Jacqueline McKenzie, and Pruitt Taylor Vince as it follows three strangers across the back roads of America with the ashes of a mutual friend. Using a series of old postcards as a map, the threesome drive from New York to Montana retracing their friend’s journey “out west” years before. As they try to make sense of the untimely death, they are forced to face the realities in their own lives that have brought them down this unpredictable road.

== Synopsis ==
Three strangers drive from New York to Montana with the ashes of their mutual friend, Henry. Using old postcards as their road map, Henry's old college buddy (Simon Baker), his southern girlfriend (Jacqueline McKenzie) and his childhood best friend (Pruitt Taylor Vince) venture out west across the timeless back roads of America in search of his final resting place. What they find along the way are pieces of themselves that lay hidden in the mysterious landscape between life and loss.

== Production ==
Stephen Grynberg is a writer and independent filmmaker based in Santa Monica (California). Love from Ground Zero marked his debut as a feature film director in 1998. Since then, Grynberg has created a number of narrative and documentary films, among them the award-winning documentary A Life Ascending and, as part of large scale art project Envisioning the Future by Judy Chicago, the documentary film and video installation Past Forward (2005). Before his career in filmmaking took off, Grynberg graduated from the Columbia University Business School with an MBA and from Northwestern University with a BS in Chemical Engineering. He then went on to receive a degree in film directing from the American Film Institute. Love from Ground Zero was written, directed and produced by Grynberg, the latter in cooperation with Aaron Cohen.

Patricia Kruijer and Chris Beckman were also Co-Producers, Neal Allen acted as Line Producer/Unit Production Manager. The film was shot in 35mm color by DP Mauro Fiore. Sandra Grass was hired as production designer for this project, Emily Schweber did the casting. Additional Editing is by Dave Baron. Michael Torres and Tiffaney Rotert did hair and make-up, Katie Vollmer was wardrobe assistant.

The film was shot on the move across the Midwestern states of Iowa, Nebraska, South Dakota, and Colorado. Rob Christoffersen, Tammy R. Richards (Colorado) and Dave Peck (Chico, second unit) accounted for the location management.

The original acoustic score was written by Grammy Award winner John McEuen (Nitty Gritty Dirt Band), production sound was mixed by Jeff Heintzleman. Still photographies were provided by Steve Claasen and Bill Walter. Dialogue coach James Devney and choreographer Stuart Mart were present on the set as well. The music was edited by Steven A. Saltzman, while Dominic Camardella engineered and mixed the score. Musicians were composer John McEuen, Randy Tico, Jonathan McEuen, Phil Salazar, Jesse Siebenberg and Chris Caswell. Additional Music is by Raney Schockne.

Along with McEuen's original score, the following songs were used in the film:

Title	Songwriter, Composer	Performer
Winter's Home	Raney Schockne	Raney Schockne (instrumentation), Janeen Rae Heller (vocals)
Highway 78	Tim Ferguson, Tobi Miller	Tim Ferguson
I'm A Stranger Here	Kurt Wagner	Lambchop
Belle Of The Ball	Tim Ferguson, Tobi Miller	Tim Ferguson
If Only You Were Mine	John Howie, Tift Merritt	Two Dollar Pistols with Tift Merritt
Jukejoint Girl	Tift Merritt	The Cabines
Tangled & Wild	Suzie Ungerleider	Oh Susanna
Pissin' In The Wind	Jerry Jeff Walker	—
By Way Of Sorrow	Julie Miller	Julie Miller
That's My Sister (instrumental)	Raney Schockne	Raney Schockne
Out Of This World	Louden Wainwright III	Freakwater
Fly Home	Jean Caffeine, Mick Buck	Jean Caffeine
In My Way	Stacey Earle	Stacey Earle

The film was dedicated to the memory of Gordon DeLima Hamilton.

== Film Festivals ==
The Film was part of the official selection at the following international film festivals in 1998 and 1999:

- Hamptons International Film Festival
- Montreal World Film Festival
- Palm Springs International Film Festival
- Las Vegas International Film Festival
- New Filmmakers Series (New York)
- Deep Ellum Film Festival (Dallas)

== Cast ==
- Simon Baker Denny as Eric, Henry's college buddy
- Jacqueline McKenzie as Samantha, Henry's girlfriend
- Pruitt Taylor Vince as Walter, Henry's childhood best friend
- Kathryn Erbe as Alexandra (″Alex″)
- James Gammon as ″Hat″
- Sam Robards as Voice of Henry
- Anne Erin Dake as Apollo Receptionist
- Holis McCarthy as Waitress At Bar
- Tim Driscoll as Male Gas Attendant
- Tara Varney as Female Gas Attendant
- Emma and Samuel Sheridan as Emmanuel
- Margaret Beth Friesen as Sally Norlen
- William Nettleman as Bill Norlen
- Gabriel Macht as New York Pedestrian
- Paul Vecchio as Sedan Driver
- David Dahl as Gas Station Owner
- Paul Emerson as Gen X Boy 2 (deleted scene)
