= Human Touch (film) =

- Theatrical release poster
- Directed by: Paul Cox
- Starring: Chris Haywood; Jacqueline McKenzie; Aaron Blabey
- Release date: 2004
- Running time: 102 minutes
- Country: Australia
- Language: English
- Box office: A$55,365

Human Touch is a 2004 film directed by Paul Cox and starring Jacqueline McKenzie, Chris Haywood and Aaron Blabey. The plot follows the story of Anna who is a singer trying to raise money for her choir's trip to China. She does this by posing nude for an ageing artist and upon seeing the finished results goes on a journey of self-discovery.

== Cast ==
- Jacqueline McKenzie as Anna
- Chris Haywood as Edward
- Aaron Blabey as David
- Tessa Humphries as Kate
- Julia Blake as Anna's Mother
- Bud Tingwell as Anna's Stepfather
- Terry Norris as Ouspensky
- Edwin Hodgeman as Mr Thompson

== See also ==
- Cinema of Australia
