= Australian Film Institute =

Non-profit organisation

- Abbreviation: AFI
- Formation: November 1958
- Type: Film and television organisation
- Headquarters: Melbourne, Victoria
- Location: 236 Dorcas Street, South Melbourne, Victoria 3205
- Region served: Australia
- Directors: Craig Campbell; Daniel Monaghan; Shane Jacobson; Toni Skaife; Tony Petani
- Website: www.aacta.org

The Australian Film Institute (AFI) was founded in 1958 as a non-profit organisation devoted to developing an active film culture in Australia and fostering engagement between the general public and the Australian film industry. It is responsible for producing Australia's premier annual film and television awards, the AACTA Awards (previously the AFI Awards).

== Overview ==
The work of the institute is supported by government funding, corporate sponsors and approximately 10,000 members nationally. As Australia's foremost motion picture industry association, AFI promotes the Australian film and television industry and plays a central role in the way in which the Australian film industry is known and understood, both locally and internationally.

In the 1970s, the AFI played a prominent part in reviving the Australian film industry and in convincing the government to invest in the creation of the Experimental Film Fund, a film school, and a corporation for advancing feature film production. The year 1976 marked the first time that the AFI Awards, which had been given since 1958, were televised. Ten years later, television categories were added to the awards.

A recent focus of the organisation has been on helping to develop the careers of Australian film artists, through the AFI Fellowship and AFI Documentary Trailblazer programs, as well as with the AFI Young Film Actor Award.

The AFI is affiliated with the Los Angeles Australian Film & Television Association. In August 2011, AFI formed a subsidiary professional organisation, the Australian Academy of Cinema and Television Arts.

== AFI Research Collection ==
The AFI Research Collection is a significant non-lending, specialist film and television industry resource. The collection is managed by the RMIT Australian Screen Research Collection and is open to the public at the Swanston Library on RMIT University's City Campus. The collection has particular strengths in screen history and theory and in Australian cinema, and features a diverse range of books, journals, film scripts, film directories, reports and film festival catalogues.

== See also ==
- Cinema of Australia
