= Deborra-Lee Furness =

Australian actress and producer (born 1955)

Deborra-Lee Furness AO
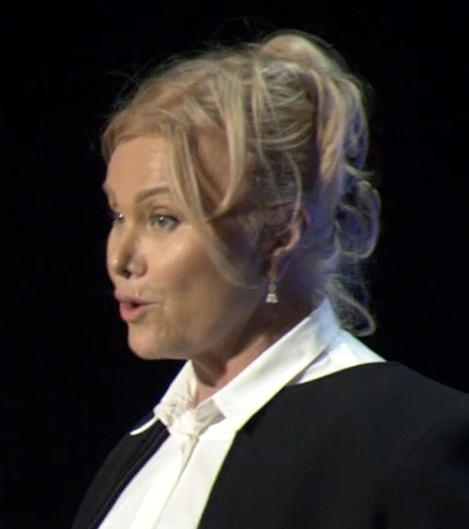
- Furness in 2018
- Born: 30 November 1955 (age 70); Annandale, New South Wales, Australia
- Years active: 1975–present
- Spouse: Hugh Jackman (m. 1996; div. 2025)
- Children: 2
- Honours: Officer of the Order of Australia (2022)

Deborra-Lee Furness, AO (born 30 November 1955) is an Australian actress and producer. Furness was appointed an Officer of the Order of Australia in 2022.

== Early life ==
Furness was born in Annandale, a suburb of Sydney, New South Wales, and raised in Melbourne, Victoria. At the age of 18, Furness attended secretarial school to learn shorthand and typing after her mother advised her to have a back-up career if her acting ambitions didn't come to fruition. In 1974-1975 Furness regularly appeared as 'Debbie', an office girl at Channel 12 in the soap opera The Box. The role was minor, often uncredited and typically non-speaking and usually saw Furness in the background in cafe and bar scenes, often in the company of 'Chris - Office Boy' (Chris Hopley). She also appeared - once again as an office girl, this time unnamed - in an episode of Division 4 screened in mid-1975.

She then got a job as the assistant to John Sorell, the news director at Channel 9. Despite describing herself as "such a bog secretary", Furness has said she thoroughly enjoyed the urgency, the fast action and the high energy of the newsroom. After working in the newsroom for a year, in 1975 Furness was asked to work on No Man's Land, the station's daytime current affairs program which was produced exclusively by women and hosted by Mickie de Stoop. Furness started working on the show as a researcher before becoming an on-air reporter. After her work at Channel 9, Furness then travelled through Europe for one year.

She studied acting at the American Academy of Dramatic Arts in New York City, where she graduated in either 1981 or 1982. She performed on the stage in New York and played Kathleen, the Australian wife of Cole Gioberti (Billy Moses) on the television series Falcon Crest before returning to Australia to continue her acting career.

== Career ==
Furness rose to fame in 1988 when she starred in the movie Shame, for which she won Best Actor awards from the Film Critics Circle of Australia and the Golden Space Needle Award from the Seattle International Film Festival. Other roles included an episode of Halifax f.p. and The Flying Doctors. In 1993, Furness appeared as Chrissy in the television mini-series Stark starring Ben Elton and Jacqueline McKenzie. In 1995, she featured in the film Angel Baby directed by Michael Rymer and starring Jacqueline McKenzie and John Lynch. The film followed the story of two schizophrenic people who met during therapy and fell passionately in love.

Also in 1995, she starred in the title role in the television series Correlli, where she met her future husband, Hugh Jackman. From 1995 to 1996, Furness starred in television series Fire alongside Andy Anderson and Wayne Pygram. Furness played the role of Dolores Kennedy.

An adoptive mother of two, Furness is known for her work assisting orphans globally and streamlining international adoptions, especially in her native Australia where she is a patron, and one of the creators, of National Adoption Awareness Week. She has addressed the National Press Club of Australia on the subject of adoption laws in Australia. Furness is a patron of the Lighthouse Foundation for displaced children and International Adoption Families for Queensland. She is also a World Vision ambassador and serves on the Advisory Committee for Film Aid International, working with refugees throughout the world.

== Personal life ==
Furness met actor Hugh Jackman on the set of Australian TV show Correlli in 1995. Their wedding ceremony took place on 11 April 1996 at St. John's in Toorak, Victoria, a suburb of Melbourne. After going through two miscarriages, she adopted two children with Jackman: a boy born in 2000 and a girl born in 2005. A portrait of Furness and Jackman by Paul Newton was a finalist in the 2022 Archibald Prize. In September 2023, the couple announced their separation. She filed for divorce in May 2025 and it was finalised in June 2025.

== Honour ==
In 2014, Deborra-Lee Furness was named as the New South Wales Australian of the Year for her work in adoption campaigning.

== Filmography ==
=== Film ===
Film
Year	Film	Role	Type
1985	Crossover Dreams	Statue of Liberty	
1985	Jenny Kissed Me	Carol Grey	
1985	Cool Change	Lee	
1986	The Humpty Dumpty Man	Carmel DeVries	
1987	The Bit Part	Acting Teacher	
1988	Shame	Asta Cadell	
1988	Evil Angels	Magazine Reporter	
1988	Two Brothers Running	Silver's Secretary	
1988	Celia	Miss Greenaway	
1990	Blue Heat aka 'The Last of the Finest'	Linda Daly	
1991	Voyager aka 'Homo Faber'	Ivy	
1991	Waiting	Diane	
1992	Newsies	Esther Jacobs	
1995	Angel Baby	Louise Goodman	
1995	When Harry Coached Sally	Sally	Short
1998	The Real Macaw	Beth Girdis	
2006	Jindabyne	Jude	
2008	Sleepwalking	Danni	
2009	Beautiful	Mrs. Thomson	
2009	Blessed	Tanya	
2010	Legend of the Guardians: The Owls of Ga'Hoole	Barran (Voice)	Animated film
2014	Dukale's Dream	Herself	Documentary
2023	Force of Nature: The Dry 2	Jill Bailey	

=== Television ===
Year	Film	Role	Type
1975	The Box	Office Girl	6 episodes
1975	Division 4	Junior 1	Episode: "The Human Factor"
1979	Prisoner	Connie (uncredited)	3 episodes
1980	Cop Shop	Trisha Clarke	1 episode
1983	All the Rivers Run		Miniseries
1983-1984	Kings	Frances Dalton	Recurring role
1984	Carson's Law		1 episode
1984	Special Squad	Liz Jenkins	Episode: "The Long Secret"
1985	Neighbours	Linda Fielding	5 episodes
1985	The Flying Doctors	Fran	Miniseries
1985	Glass Babies	Joan Simpson	Miniseries
1986	The Fast Lane	Guest role: Stella	1 episode
1987	Falcon Crest	Kathleen Gioberti	Episode: "The New Faces"
1987	A Matter of Convenience	Valma	TV film
1988	Sentiments	Valma	
1988	The Flying Doctors	Sapphire	Episode: "Sapphire"
1988	Act of Betrayal	Kathy	TV film
1988	Fields of Fire II	Cloris	Miniseries
1993	Stark	Chrissie	Miniseries
1993	Singapore Sling	Annie	TV film
1994	G.P.	Guest role: Kate Morrison	Episode: "All of Me"
1995	Halifax f.p.	Brigit Grant	Episode: "The Feeding"
1995	Correlli	Louisa Correlli	Recurring role
1995	Populate or Perish	Narrator	Documentary
1995–1996	Fire	Dolores Kennedy	Recurring role
1997	Roar	Guest role: Agrona	Episode: "The Cage"
2000	SeaChange	Vicki Drury	Episode: "Hungi Jury"
2007	Raising Children: A Guide to Parenting From Birth to Five	Narrator	Documentary
2009	The Beautiful Vision	Herself	Documentary
2013	Phineas and Ferb	Additional voices	Episode: "Primal Perry"
2016	Hyde & Seek	Claudia Rossini	Miniseries
2020	Misunderstandings of Miscarriage	Herself	Documentary

=== Television appearances ===
Year	Film	Role	Type
1974	No Man's Land	Herself - Reporter	
1989	The Media Show	Guest	1 episode
1991 & 1992	Tonight Live with Steve Vizard	Guest	2 episodes
1992	The Morning Show	Guest	1 episode
1992	In Sydney Today	Guest	1 episode
1994	Level 23	Guest	1 episode
1994	Sale of the Century	Contestant	2 episodes
1994-2005	Good Morning Australia	Guest	
1994; 1995 & 1998	Hey Hey It's Saturday	Guest	3 episodes
1994 & 1995	TVTV	Herself	2 episodes
1995	Ernie and Denise	Guest	1 episode
1995 & 1997	Midday	Guest (1997 episode with Hugh Jackman)	2 episodes
1995	The Australia Remembers Tribute Gala	Herself	TV special
1995	World Vision Appeal: Vision For a Better World	Herself	TV special
1996	Witness	Herself	1 episode
1996	This Is Your Life	Herself	1 episode
1997	Mouthing Off	Guest	1 episode
1998	The Making of 'The Real Macaw'	Herself	TV special
1998	Saturday Night Fever	Herself	TV special
1998	Carols in the Domain	Herself	TV special
1999	Fox Studios Australia: The Grand Opening	Guest (with Hugh Jackman)	TV special
2003	Australian Story	Herself	1 episode
2003	Rove Live	Guest	1 episode
2004	Enough Rope with Andrew Denton	Guest	1 episode
2006	At the Movies	Herself	1 episode
2006	Jindabyne: The Process	Herself	Documentary
2006 & 2024	Sunrise	Guest	2 episodes
2006 & 2024	Today	Guest (2024 episode with Eric Bana)	2 episodes
2006 & 2008	Mornings with Kerri-Anne	Guest	2 episodes
2007	Dancing with the Stars	Herself	1 episode
2007	The 2007 Australian Film Institute Awards	Presenter	TV special
2007	The Directors' Series	Herself	
2008	9am with David & Kim	Guest	1 episode
2009	Australia Unites: The Victorian Bushfire Appeal	Herself	TV special
2009	20 to 1	Herself	2 episodes
2009; 2021 & 2024	The Project	Guest	3 episodes
2009	Artscape	Herself - Interviewee	1 episode
2010	Seeds of Hope	Herself	Documentary
2010	This Is Your Life	Herself	1 episode
2011 & 2012	The Circle	Guest	2 episodes
2011	Mornings	Guest	1 episode
2011	Kimchi Chronicles	Herself	Documentary
2012	The 66th Annual Tony Awards	Presenter	TV special
2012	Can of Worms	Herself	1 episode
2012	The Living Room	Herself	1 episode
2012	60 Minutes	Herself (segment "Hugh Jackman")	1 episode
2013	The Tonight Show With Jay Leno	Herself (at the Vanity Fair Oscar Party)	
2013	Jimmy Kimmel Live!	Guest	
2013	The View	Guest Co-hostess	
2013	Oprah's Next Chapter	Herself	
2013; 2016; 2018 & 2019	Global Citizen Festival	Herself (2018 as host)	TV special
2014	Family Confidential	Herself	
2014	The Talk	Guest Co-hostess	2 episodes
2014 & 2018	NBC Today Show	Guest	2 episodes
2015	CBS This Morning	Herself – Co-Founder, Global Citizen	1 episode
2017; 2021; 2022 & 2023	Studio 10	Guest (2022 episode with Hugh Jackman)	4 episodes
2018	E Live from the Red Carpet	Herself	
2018	Entertainment Tonight Canada	Herself	
2018	Entertainment Tonight	Herself	1 episode
2020	Anh's Brush with Fame	Interviewee	1 episode
2021 & 2024	The Project	Guest	2 episodes
2022	This Is Your Life: Rebecca Gibney	Herself (with Hugh Jackman)	1 episode
2024	Sunrise	Guest (with Eric Bana)	1 episode
2024	News Breakfast	Guest (with Jacqueline McKenzie)	1 episode
2024	Weekend Today	Guest (with Eric Bana)	1 episode

== Awards ==
- 1988 SIFF Award for the best actress in Seattle International Film Festival.
- 1988 Film Critics Circle of Australia Award for the best actress.
- 1991 Silver Shell for the best actress in San Sebastián International Film Festival.
