= Frog Dreaming =

- Australian film poster
- Directed by: Brian Trenchard-Smith
- Written by: Everett De Roche
- Produced by: Barbi Taylor
- Starring: Henry Thomas; Tony Barry
- Cinematography: John R. McLean
- Edited by: Brian Kavanagh
- Music by: Brian May
- Production companies: UAA Films; Middle Reef Productions; Western Film Productions
- Distributed by: Greater Union Film Distributors
- Release date: 1 May 1986
- Running time: 93 minutes
- Country: Australia
- Language: English
- Budget: A$3.88 million
- Box office: A$171,000

Frog Dreaming is a 1986 Australian family adventure film written by Everett De Roche and directed by Brian Trenchard-Smith. It starred Henry Thomas, Tony Barry, Rachel Friend and Tamsin West.

Frog Dreaming was released under numerous alternate titles in other markets, including The Go-Kids in the UK, The Quest in the US, The Spirit Chaser in Germany, Fighting Spirits in Finland and The Mystery of the Dark Lake in Italy, The Boy Who Chases Ghosts in Bulgaria, 1987, etc.

== Synopsis ==
At an isolated pond in the wilderness of Victoria, Australia, a lone man fishing in a rowboat is surprised when the wind picks up, spinning an old farm windmill, and water violently churns in the middle of the pond. He flees to his ramshackle camp on the shore and is terrified by a large shape rising from the water.

Young American orphan Cody Walpole finishes building his latest idea, a rail bike. Taking it to the Woods Point railroad station, he sets it up for a high-speed downhill ride to school, exciting an audience of kids on bikes, including Wendy, who Cody has a crush on. Several interested adults also show up to watch the event. Everyone races to the destination station just as Cody passes by. His brakes fail and he barely avoids a collision with an oncoming speeder. Police sergeant Ricketts chastises Cody and later discusses Cody’s youthful recklessness with Gaza, who was best friends with Cody’s late father and is taking care of Cody.

Cody takes Wendy and her younger sister Jane on a bike ride to Devil’s Knob, a wildlife preserve. They find the abandoned camp, which Cody recognizes as being used by an acquaintance, Neville. After wandering around, they discover Neville’s decomposed body. Cody brings Ricketts to the camp, who believes Neville died of a heart attack and declares the pond off limits. Cody asks Gaza about the pond, who tells him it’s Donkegin Hole, home of a bunyip - a monster which eats rocks, breathes fire and is impervious to spears. Cody believes that it’s an undersea creature similar to the Loch Ness Monster or a plesiosaur.

Cody asks an Aboriginal construction manager, who tells Cody that he should ask Charlie Pride if he wants to learn more. An Aboriginal musician tells Cody that Donkegin is Kurdaitcha, aborigine magic. Seeing Donkegin was a rite of passage, as only those worthy to be warriors could look at it and live. He tells Cody that he should seek Charlie Pride at a nearby Aboriginal river community. Pride puts him through a test of fear, which Cody passes. Asked if Donkegin is real, Pride encourages him, “You go and see.”

Cody builds a homemade cannon, waits at Donkegin Hole and tries to lure the bunyip with bait. When it surfaces, he fires the cannon but it has no effect. He has another idea to wear an inverted fishbowl as a diving helmet to investigate the depths, using a barrel of water up a hill to compress air in a lower barrel as his air supply. Wendy is horrified but acts as his assistant. Cody enters the pond but doesn’t emerge after a violent upwelling. Wendy jumps on a motorcycle and rides into town to get help. Everyone believes Cody has drowned. Ricketts and Gaza go to the pond and connect pumps to drain the pond in order to recover his body.

A doctor sedates the distraught Wendy, but she dreams about air bubbling in Cody’s aquarium, which convinces her that Cody may still be alive in an air bubble. She asks Cody’s mentor, book author Mr. Kauffman, for help, who calls for a rescue helicopter and divers. Hearing that Cody may be alive, the entire town rushes to Donkegin Hole. The divers plunge in and find Cody inside a steel chamber. Everyone watches in horror as the lurching, monstrous shape emerges from the water, with Cody in its mouth. He frees himself and swims to safety. Charlie Pride, watching alone from a cliff above, gestures, causing seaweed and other detritus to fall off the Donkegin. The locals recognize it as an excavator or some other kind of old mining equipment, hydraulically powered by the windmill-driven windpump. They believe Donkegin is a corruption of “donkey engine.”

Later, Cody returns to Donkegin Hole, where he spots Charlie Pride in Aboriginal garb across the pond. He realizes that Pride is in fact the Kurdaitcha Man. Pride smiles approvingly, gestures and all traces of equipment and Neville's camp are dragged into the water by an unseen force, rendering the sacred site pristine again. Cody realizes with awe and satisfaction that Kurdaitcha and the Donkegin do exist.

== Cast ==
- Henry Thomas as Cody Walpole
- Tony Barry as Gaza
- Rachel Friend as Wendy
- Tamsin West as Jane
- John Ewart as Ricketts
- Dempsey Knight as Charlie Pride
- Chris Gregory as Wheatley
- Mark Knight as Henry
- Katy Manning as Mrs. Cannon
- Dennis Miller as Mr. Cannon
- Peter Cummins as Neville

== Production ==
The film was originally directed by Russell Hagg. However the producer and writer were not satisfied with progress and tracked down Brian Trenchard-Smith who had just finished an episode of Five Mile Creek and asked him to take over. Trenchard-Smith liked the script and was interested in working with Henry Thomas, so he accepted.

Scenes from the movie were filmed in the Victorian town of Woods Point in the Yarra Ranges National Park. The former quarry site of Moorooduc Quarry Flora and Fauna Reserve, located in Mount Eliza, Victoria, was used as a location for Donkegin Hole. The Menzies Creek railway station was redressed as the Woods Point station. Nobelius Siding was used for the destination station of Cody's rail bike ride.

According to director Trenchard-Smith on the video commentary, the production company negotiated with the Walt Disney Company, which offered a $1 million box office guarantee. The company demanded $3 million, an amount Disney refused to give. Miramax eventually became the US distributor but did not effectively market the film. Ironically, Disney acquired Miramax in 1993, toward the end of the home video distribution contract but years after the theatrical window.

The film was released under several alternate titles in different markets.

== Box office ==
Frog Dreaming grossed $171,000 at the box office in Australia.

== Reception ==
Glenn Dunks of sbs.com.au commented "comparable to the likes of Goonies, Flight of the Navigator, and The Monster Squad, Trenchard-Smith's film harkens back to a time before most kids' films weren't just computer-generated."

=== Accolades ===
Award	Category	Subject	Result
AACTA Awards (1986 AFI Awards)	Best Editing	Brian Kavanagh	Won
AACTA Awards (1986 AFI Awards)	Best Original Music Score	Brian May	Nominated
AACTA Awards (1986 AFI Awards)	Best Sound	Craig Carter	Nominated
AACTA Awards (1986 AFI Awards)	Best Sound	Tim Chau	Nominated
AACTA Awards (1986 AFI Awards)	Best Sound	Mark Lewis	Nominated
AACTA Awards (1986 AFI Awards)	Best Sound	Ken Sallows	Nominated
AACTA Awards (1986 AFI Awards)	Best Sound	Roger Savage	Nominated
AACTA Awards (1986 AFI Awards)	Best Sound	Rex Watts	Nominated
AACTA Awards (1986 AFI Awards)	Best Production Design	Jon Dowding	Nominated

== See also ==
- Cinema of Australia
