= Children of the Sun (play) =

1905 play written by Maxim Gorky

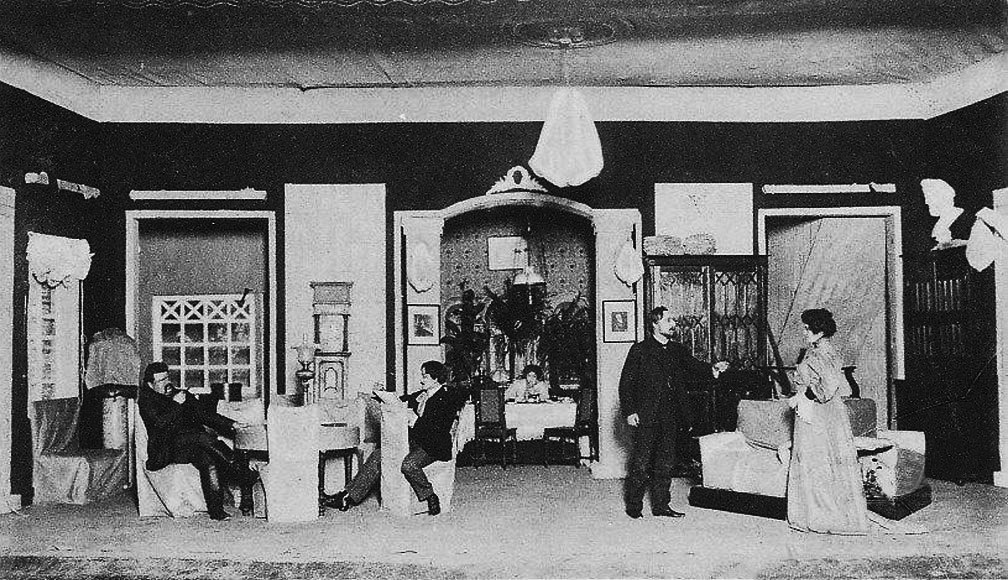
- Original language: Russian
- Written by: Maxim Gorky

Premiere
- Date: 12 October 1905
- Place: Komissarzhevskaya Theatre, Saint-Petersburg, Russia

Children of the Sun (Russian: Дети солнца, romanized: Deti solntsa) is a 1905 play by Maxim Gorky, written while he was briefly imprisoned in Saint Petersburg's Peter and Paul Fortress during the abortive Russian Revolution of 1905.

Gorky appears to have written the play chiefly during the last eight days of his imprisonment, before his February 2, 1905 release, in response to the international protests over the imprisonment of such a prominent writer. It was nominally set during an 1862 cholera epidemic, but was universally understood to relate to contemporary events.

== Production history ==
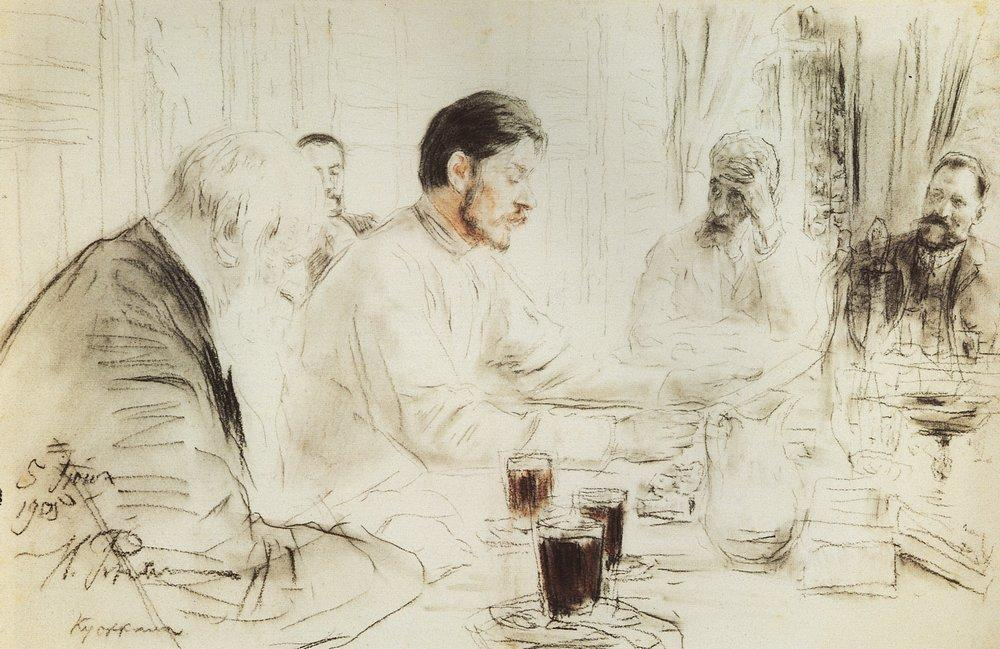
Maxim Gorky reading his drama Children of the Sun at The Penates, the house of the artist Ilya Repin, who did the drawing in 1905.

The play was initially banned, but imperial authorities allowed it to premiere in October of 1905 at the Komissarzhevskaya Theatre and the Moscow Art Theatre. Given conditions in the city, the atmosphere was so tense that the audience began to panic in response to the mob noises in Act III. Kachalov had to stop the play to assure them that, while his character might be in danger from a mob, the audience was not.

== Characters ==
- Professor Pavel Protasov
- Yelena, his wife
- Lisa, his sister
- Dmitry Vagin, an artist
- Boris Chepurnoy
- Melanya, his sister
- Nazar Avdeyevich
- Misha, his son
- Yakov Troshin
- Egor, a locksmith
- Avdotya, his wife
- Antonovna, the nanny
- Fima, the maid
- Lusha, the maid
- Roman
- The Doctor

== Plot ==
The title refers to the privileged intellectual elite of Russia, epitomised by Protassoff, high-minded and idealistic, but basically unaware of what is going on around them in the lower depths. Lisa, in contrast, is sickly, nervous, and prophetically aware of impending crisis. It is set during an 1862 cholera epidemic in Russia in which fear drove people to mob action.

Protassov's detachment leaves him oblivious to the nearly mad Melanya's love for him; to his wife's confused love for his best friend and artist, Dmitri Vaguin; to the brutality of his assistant Yegor, and ultimately to the danger of the armed mob that comes to attack him.
