= Rowena Wallace =

English-born Australian actress (born 1947)

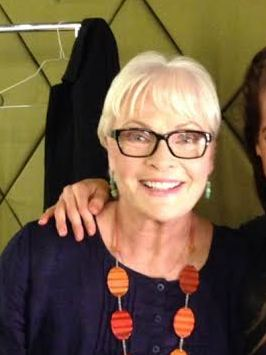
- Born: Rowena Diana Wallace; 23 August 1947 (age 79); Coventry, West Midlands, England
- Occupation: Actress
- Years active: 1962–2020
- Known for: Sons and Daughters as Patricia "Pat the Rat" Hamilton/Morrell/Palmer
- Notable work: Prisoner (TV series) as Anne Griffin; Home and Away (TV series) as June Reynolds; Neighbours (TV series) as Mary Casey
- Spouse: George Assang (m. 1973; div. 1974)

Rowena Diana Wallace (born 23 August 1947) is an English-born Australian stage and screen actress, most especially in the genre of television soap opera. She is best known for her Gold Logie-winning role as conniving Patricia "Pat the Rat" Hamilton/Morrell/Palmer in Sons and Daughters, being the first soap star to win the Gold Logie. After leaving the series and being replaced in the role by Belinda Giblin, Wallace returned in the final season as Patricia's sister Pamela Hudson.

She started her career on the small screen in the late 1960s in serial You Can't See 'Round Corners as well as appearing in that serial's film version and also had roles in early adventure shows The Rovers and Barrier Reef with Joe James.

She had regular roles in TV series including Crawford Productions Division 4 and also Number 96 and Cop Shop

In 1980–1981, Rowena became best well known to international audiences for her stint as deranged inmate Anne Griffin in cult series Prisoner. (also known as internationally in the United Kingdom and United States as Prisoner: Cell Block H)

After Sons and Daughters, she subsequently appeared primarily in guest roles and cameos in numerous TV serials, before again returning to more permanent fixtures in regular roles from 2000 to 2003 in Home and Away as June Reynolds, in Neighbours in 2007 as Mary Casey and in Deadly Women as gangland figure Judy Moran in 2012.

She has appeared as herself as a panellist on talk show Beauty and the Beast and featured regularly on Bert Newton's popular morning breakfast show Good Morning Australia.

== Early life ==
Rowena Wallace was born in Coventry, West Midlands, England, as an only child. She moved to Australia with her parents when she was five, settling in the state of Queensland. Her father was a pilot for Ansett Airlines. Initially she grew up in Cairns and later moved to Brisbane at the age of 12 years. There, she attended Kedron State High School. After finishing school she became interested in acting and was taken by her mother to dancing lessons at, and was also persuaded to join, the Twelfth Night Theatre under the artistic direction of Joan Whalley.

At age fifteen, having left school and attended a business college at the insistence of her parents, Wallace decided to become an actress. She joined an advertising agency while still performing in the theatre at night.

== Career ==
=== Early roles ===
Wallace's first television role was in Brisbane as an entertainer on the variety show Theatre Royal hosted by George Wallace Jnr (no relation). She also presented the afternoon news and weather and a children's show.

While she was working in Brisbane, Barry Creyton persuaded the producers of a new series to fly Wallace down to Sydney to audition for the lead role in their show. As a result Wallace won the role of Margie Harris in You Can't See 'Round Corners in 1967 and moved to Sydney. She would also feature in the 1969 film version.

After completing Round Corners, she went on to star as the juvenile lead in a short-run TV series called The Rovers; meanwhile, she also starred in the hit comedy stage production between takes of The Rovers with John McCallum and Googie Withers. The show, Relatively Speaking, played to packed audiences in Melbourne.

On 12 February 1970, the film Squeeze a Flower had its world premiere in Sydney. Wallace starred in the movie as the female lead, opposite international Italian film star Walter Chiari. By 1972, she had found work intermittently. In 1973 she married George Assang, some 20 years her senior, a Thursday Island-born jazz singer and actor known professionally as Vic Sabrino. The marriage lasted just over a year, and Wallace has had no long-term relationships since then.

"The Rovers" was a production that soon led to the Number 96 smash hit TV series. Produced by NLT Productions, executive producer was Bill Harmon and producer Don Cash, who would become famous for creating Number 96. The series was created by Roger Mirams and starred Rowena Wallace, Edward Hepple, Noel Trevarthen and child actor Grant Seiden. The storylines revolve around the adventures of the crew of the Pacific Lady, an island schooner owned by Captain Sam McGill (or 'Cap' for short), played by Hepple, Bob Wild (a freelance photographer) played by Trevarthen and Rusty Collins, a wildlife journalist (played by Wallace).

=== Number 96 and Prisoner ===
In the late 1970s she appeared frequently on Australian television, with an ongoing role in the soap opera Number 96 in 1975–1976, followed by a regular role in the police drama Cop Shop, playing policeman's wife Pamela Taylor. After leaving that series she played a mentally unbalanced remand prisoner named Anne Griffin in Prisoner for several weeks in late 1980.

=== Sons and Daughters ===
Rowena Wallace's most famous role was in the soap opera Sons and Daughters, in which she played Patricia Dunne/Hamilton/Morrell/Palmer, starting in 1981. Nicknamed "Pat the Rat", the character became an immensely popular 'bitch' figure in the series; it was the series' most famous character.

In 1984 Wallace won a Gold Logie for the portrayal during an era when Gold Logies were usually won by major television personalities and hosts but not actors. She was the first woman soap actress to win the award since it was opened up to Most Popular Australian Personality. She was not the first female to win the Gold Logie, that honour going to Australian actress Lorrae Desmond. Wallace also received four Silver Logies.

Wallace left Sons and Daughters after three years, with her final scenes going to air early in 1985 just after her Gold Logie win. Wallace claimed in a reunion documentary that she left due to exhaustion from playing such an intense character. She also claimed she regretted walking away from the role as she did not get the later acting offers she had anticipated. The popularity of her character led to it being recast, with Belinda Giblin assuming the role of a returning Patricia after extensive cosmetic surgery had altered her facial features. Late in the show's run, with ratings in decline, Wallace was returned to the series in an attempt to boost the show's popularity. With Giblin remaining in the show, Wallace now played a new character, that of Patricia's long-lost identical twin sister Pamela. Her return lasted ten weeks but did little to halt the show's dwindling ratings, and the show was cancelled shortly afterwards.

=== Home and Away and Neighbours ===
Between years 2000 and 2003 Wallace appeared in the weeknight soap opera Home and Away as June Reynolds.

In 2007 Wallace joined the cast of Neighbours for several months. She played Mary Casey, an unstable woman who ended up in prison for the false imprisonment of Pepper Steiger. Mary's cellmate turned out to be Sky Mangel.

=== Other roles ===
In 2012 Wallace starred as Melbourne gangland matriarch Judy Moran in the Foxtel series Deadly Women.

In September 2016 Wallace had a cameo in Wonthaggi Theatrical Group's production of Little Shop of Horrors as the narrator.

== Personal life ==
Wallace was briefly married to George Assang from 1973 to 1974.

At the age of nineteen, Wallace was diagnosed with scoliosis. She has required painkillers almost continuously since then.

Between July 1999 and November 2003, Wallace was collecting a disability support pension, despite being actively employed by television series such as Water Rats, Beauty and the Beast and Good Morning Australia. In October 2005, she was charged with social security fraud, and given a suspended sentence of six months' imprisonment.

In August 2010, Wallace was the subject of a Today Tonight special feature on the Seven Network, where she was reportedly nearly broke and on the verge of becoming homeless. The following week, a number of offers to take her in were made by Australians around the country.

In March 2011, she was the subject of more media coverage, this time because the unit she occupied at subsidised rent in Wonthaggi, Victoria was due for demolition in August 2011 and she feared she would have nowhere to live. The rent in Wonthaggi had doubled or even tripled due to the Victorian Desalination Plant being constructed nearby, but her pension would not even cover her rent.

== Filmography ==
=== Film ===
Year	Title	Role	Type
1969	You Can't See 'round Corners	Margie Harris	Feature film
1970	Squeeze a Flower	June Phillips	Feature film
1976	A Break In The Music	Unknown	Film short
1981	Puberty Blues	Mrs. Knight	Feature film
1982	The Dark Room	Liz Llewellyn	Feature film
1985	Relatives	Nancy Peterson	Feature film
1986	Backstage	Evelyn Hough	Feature film
1987	Strike of the Panther	Lucy Andrews	Feature film
1989	Cappuccino	Anna	Feature film
1995	Blackwater Trail	Beth	Feature film
1998	Desire	Unknown	Film short (Tropfest)
2012	Ryder Country	Rebecca Ryder	Feature film
2019	Magdala Rose	Lady Corba de Péreille	Feature film

=== Television ===
Year	Title	Role	Type
1964	Theatre Royal	Regular role: Self	TV series
1964	Beauty and the Beast	Self – Panelist	TV series
1967–1968	You Can't See 'Round Corners	Regular role: Margie Harris	TV series, 26 episodes
1968	Contrabandits	Guest role: Carole	TV series, 1 episode: "A Game for Two Players"
1968	Hunter	Guest role: Sue	TV series, 1 Episode: "Sue"
1969	Riptide	Guest role: Cathy Smith	TV series, episode 3: "Affair at Mangrove Creek"
1969	Riptide	Guest role: Xena	TV series, episode 21: "Good Friday Island"
1969–1970	The Rovers	Regular role: Rusty Collins	TV series, 39 episodes
1970–1971	Dynasty	Guest roles: Betty Westlake / Jill Campbell	TV series, episode 4: "Young Jim Westlake", "Corrida for A Stuntman"
1970–1971	Barrier Reef	Regular role: Tracey Deane	TV series, 22 episodes
1971	Spike Milligan Special	Self	TV special
1971	What for Marianne?		TV film
1971	Spyforce	Guest role: Patricia "Trish" Mathews	TV series, episode 24: "The Lovers"
1971; 1973	Matlock Police	Guest roles: Sally Broughton / Kate White / Susan Stone	TV series, 3 episodes: "Olsen's Ghost", "Cup Fever", "Jeff's Missing"
1971–1974; 1975	Division 4	Guest roles: Andrea Hayes / Betty Miller / Brenda Kelly / Ann Marshall / WPC Diane Webster / WPC Jane Bell	TV series, 15 episodes
1971	Vision Escalator		TV film
1972	Boney	Guest role: Kat Loader	TV series, episode 3: "Boney Meets The Daybreak Killer"
1972–1973	Homicide	Guest roles: WPC Primrose Taylor / Ruth Morgan	TV series, 2 episodes: "I Love You Primrose Taylor", "Follow The Leader"
1973	A Brace and a Bit		TV pilot
1973	And Millions Will Die!	Maggi Christopher	TV film
1973–1974	Ryan	Guest roles: Kate / Sue Ogilvie / Zita / Holly Beckett	TV series, 4 episodes: "King's Bishop to Queen Three"; "Miss. Ogilvie Repents"; "Red Alert"; "Goodbye Holly Beckett"
1974	The Evil Touch	Guest role: Jean Lewis	TV series, episode 20: "Kadaitcha Country"
1974	Silent Number	Guest role: Sylvia Marsh	TV series, episode 8: "Dark Corridors"
1974	Out of Love	Guerst role: Julia Martin	TV series, episode 1: "I Don't Want To Know"
1975	Shannon's Mob	Guest role: Estelle	TV series, episode 9: "Loser Takes All"
1975	Prophet in Love		TV film
1975–1976	Number 96	Recurring role: Muriel Thompson	TV series, 18 episodes
1976	McCloud	Guest role: Jennifer McGee	TV series, season 6, episode 7: "Night Of The Shark"
1976	Power Without Glory	Recurring role: Harriet Marshall	TV miniseries, 11 episodes
1976	Murcheson Creek	Karen Fields	TV film
1976	Taggart's Treasure		TV film
1976	Bobby Dazzler	Guest role: Ruth Rierdon	TV series, episode 14: "The New Guard"
1977	Bluey	Guest role: Jean Anderson	TV series, episode 26: "The Changeling"
1977	Moynihan	Guest role	TV series, 1 episode
1977	Going Home	Jacqueline Newton	TV film
1977–1979	Cop Shop	Regular role: Pamela Taylor	TV series, 158 episodes
1977	Glenview High	Guest role: Pam Wilson	TV series, episode 10: "Quiet Nights and Silent Deaths"
1978	Catspaw	Regular role: Kate Keppel	TV series, 7 episodes
1979	Burn the Butterflies	Dr. Trish Morrison	Teleplay / TV film
1979	Ray Lawler Trilogy	Self – Presenter	Teleplay series, 3 episodes
1980	Water Under the Bridge	Regular role: Honor Mazzini	TV miniseries, 4 episodes
1980	Skyways	Guest role: Ann Wallace	TV series, episode 148: "Spaces"
1980–1981	Prisoner	Recurring role: Anne Griffin	TV series, 8 episodes
1981	Holiday Island	Guest role: Marjorie Quinn	TV series, 2 episodes: "Zack", "Island Queen"
1981	Outbreak of Love	Diana Von Flugel	TV miniseries
1981	The Willow Bend Mystery (aka The Mesmerist)	Regular role: Linda	TV miniseries, 5 episodes screened in 1983
1982–1985	Sons and Daughters	Regular role: Patricia Hamilton / Patricia Morrell / Patricia Palmer	TV series, 480 episodes
1985	Glass Babies	Dr Gloria McCrae	TV miniseries, 2 episodes
1987	Sons and Daughters	Recurring role: Pamela Hudson	TV series, 40 episodes
1988	Tender Loving Care		TV pilot, never aired
1988	All the Way	Elaine Seymour	TV miniseries, 3 episodes
1988–1989	All the Way	Regular role: Elaine Seymour	TV series, 26 episodes
1989	Mission: Impossible	Guest role: Major Natalia Zorbuskaya	TV series, episode 8: "The Pawn"
1989	G.P.	Guest role:	TV series, 1 episode
1990	Flair	Pamela Winter-Smith	TV miniseries; 2 episodes
1990	More Winners: The Big Wish	The Queen	TV film series, 1 episode
1992	The Flying Doctors	Recurring Guest role: Paulina Giglia	TV series, season 9, episode 27: "Wimp"
1992	A Country Practice	Guest role: Justice Patricia Lincoln	TV series, season 12, episode 71: "Nothing But the Truth: Part 1"
1995	G.P.	Guestrole: Elizabeth Armstrong	TV series, episode 24: "Private Faces, Public Places"
1995	Echo Point	Recurring role: Elizabeth O'Connor	TV series, 5 episodes
1996	Shark Bay	Regular role: Clarissa Delaney	TV series
1997–1998	Pacific Drive	Recurring role: Mara de Villenois / Mara Devlin	TV series
2000	All Saints	Guest role: Katrina Ford	TV series, season 3, episode 4: "Eye Of The Beholder"
2000	Pizza	Guest role: Anne Griffin	TV series, episode 9: "Gambling Pizza"
2000	Water Rats	Guest role: Dolly Munro	TV series, season 5, episode 30: "Remember This"
2000–2003	Home and Away	Recurring role: June Reynolds	TV series, 20 episodes
2001	The Finder (aka Trackdown)	Irene Davidson	TV film
2003	Code 11-14	Mrs. Shaw	TV film
2007	Neighbours	Recurring role: Mary Casey	TV series, 14 episodes
2012	Deadly Women	Judy Moran	TV series
2012	Micro Nation	Tottie Nesbit	TV series, episode: "Meet Pullamawang"

=== Television (as self) ===
Year	Title	Role	Type
1984	On the Edge of Survival	Presenter	TV special
1984	Russian Spectacular With Torvill And Dean	Host	TV special
1985	Return to Children in Crisis	Presenter	TV special
1986	A Chance to Live	Presenter	TV special
1987	Fight for Survival	Presenter	TV special
1989	Save the Children	Presenter	TV special
1990	Some of My Children	Presenter	TV special
1991	Cry Children	Presenter	TV special

== Theatre ==
Year	Title	Role	Type
1963	Hamlet		
1964	Calamity Jane	Jane	La Boite
1965	King Lear		
1965	Little Red Riding Hood		
1966	God Save the Queen		
1970	Relatively Speaking	Virginia	Phillip Street Theatre, Princess Theatre, Melbourne, Canberra Theatre, Her Majesty's Theatre, Adelaide, Theatre Royal, Hobart
1973	A Break in the Music		Independent Theatre
1973	By Candlelight		
1974	Old Times		UNSW Studio One
1981	Rattle of a Simple Man	Cyrenne	Regal Theatre, Perth
1985	Stepping Out		Regal Theatre, Perth, Opera Theatre, Adelaide, Comedy Theatre, Melbourne, Canberra Theatre Centre
1986-87	A Coupla White Chicks		
1987	Bedroom Farce		Playhouse Theatre, Perth
1989	How the Other Half Loves		Glen Street Theatre, Laycock Street Theatre, Twelfth Night Theatre, Gold Coast Arts Centre
1989	42nd Street		
1990	Blithe Spirit		Illawarra Performing Arts Centre, Twelfth Night Theatre, Gold Coast Arts Centre, Laycock Street Theatre, Sydney Opera House
1991	Double Act		Australian national tour
1992	Same Time, Next Year		Glen Street Theatre, Playhouse Theatre, Perth
1993	Lend Me a Tenor		Glen Street Theatre
1993	Deceptions		Riverside Theatres Parramatta
1994	Night of 1001 Stars		
1997	Rebecca		Twelfth Night Theatre
2000	Follies		
2000	The Sound of Music	Frau Schmidt	Burswood Dome, Festival Theatre, Adelaide
2001	The Vagina Monologues		
2002	Bench		Darlinghurst Theatre
2003	The Full Monty	Molly MacGregor	State Theatre, Melbourne
2006	Mavis Bramston Reloaded	Various characters	Brisbane City Hall, Twin Towns Services Club
2008	Theatresports		
2016	Little Shop of Horrors	Narrator	Wonthaggi Theatrical Group
2020	The Secret Garden	Mrs Medlock	Sydney Lyric Theatre (cancelled due to COVID)

== Awards ==
Year	Association	Category	Work	Result
1983	Logie Awards	Silver Logie for Most Popular Lead Actress	Sons and Daughters	Won
1984	Logie Awards	Gold Logie	Sons and Daughters	Won
1984	Logie Awards	Silver Logie for Most Popular Actress	Sons and Daughters	Won
1984	Logie Awards	Silver Logie for Best Actress in a Series	Sons and Daughters	Won
1985	Logie Awards	Silver Logie for Best Lead Actress in a Series	Sons and Daughters	Won
