= Razorback (film) =

1984 Australian horror film

- Theatrical release poster
- Directed by: Russell Mulcahy
- Written by: Everett De Roche
- Based on: Razorback by Peter Brennan
- Produced by: Hal McElroy
- Starring: Gregory Harrison
- Cinematography: Dean Semler
- Edited by: William M. Anderson
- Music by: Iva Davies
- Production companies: UAA Films; McElroy & McElroy; Western Film Productions
- Distributed by: Greater Union Film Distributors
- Release date: 19 April 1984 (Australia)
- Running time: 91 minutes
- Country: Australia
- Language: English
- Budget: A$5.5 million
- Box office: A$801,000 (Australia)

Razorback is a 1984 Australian natural horror film written by Everett De Roche and directed by Russell Mulcahy. It is based on Peter Brennan's 1981 novel. In the film, a gigantic wild boar terrorizes the Australian outback, killing and devouring people. It was released theatrically in Australia by Greater Union Film Distributors on 19 April 1984, and in the United States by Warner Bros. Pictures on 16 November 1984.

It has been called Australia's "greatest creature feature."

== Plot ==
A man named Jake Cullen is babysitting his grandson in the Australian outback when a massive razorback boar smashes through his house and carries off his grandson to devour. Jake is accused of murdering the child. Although people do not believe his story, he is ultimately acquitted due to lack of evidence. The event destroys his life, and he vows revenge on the boar.

Two years later, American wildlife reporter Beth Winters is in the outback documenting the hunting of Australian wildlife that is then processed into pet food at a run-down factory. She gets video footage of two thugs, Benny Baker and his brother Dicko, illegally making pet food, and the criminals chase her down in their car. They force her off the road and attempt to rape her, only to be chased off by the same boar that killed Jake's grandson. Beth attempts to hide in her car, but the boar rips off the door, drags her out and eats her. With no witnesses, people assume she fell down an abandoned mine shaft after wrecking her car, and her disappearance is ruled an accident.

Some time later, Beth's husband Carl travels to Australia in search of her and encounters Jake, whom Beth interviewed during her initial report. Jake refers Carl to the local cannery, where he meets Benny and Dicko. He pretends to be a Canadian visitor and convinces them to take him on their next kangaroo hunt. When Carl spoils a potential kill, the two abandon him. Carl is then attacked by a herd of wild pigs, spurred on by the giant boar, which chase him through the night and force him to take shelter atop a windmill. The next morning, the pigs knock over the windmill, but Carl is saved by landing in a pond, which the pigs fear entering.

Once the pigs leave, Carl attempts to make his way back to civilization, all the while suffering from dehydration-induced hallucinations. Finally, he reaches the house of Sarah Cameron, a friend of Jake who has been studying the local pig population and the only person who believes his story of the giant razorback. While recovering, Carl learns from Sarah that something has been causing the wild pigs excess stress leading them to unusual behaviour such as increased aggression and cannibalising their own young. Meanwhile, after learning that Carl had seen the razorback, Jake sets out for the pumping station and shoots the razorback with one of Sarah's tracking darts. He also finds Beth's wedding ring in the boar's faeces, which he returns to a grieving Carl.

Benny and Dicko overhear a radio conversation suggesting that Jake knows what really happened to Beth. Fearful that Jake is attempting to implicate them in her death, Benny and Dicko attack him at his camp, breaking his legs with bolt-cutters and leaving him to be killed by the razorback. His remains are later found by Sarah and Carl, along with marks in the dirt made by Dicko's cleaver. Realising that the brothers were responsible for both Beth and Jake's deaths, Carl attacks Benny at the brothers' lair, interrogating him by dangling him over a mine shaft before dropping him into it. As Sarah gets a group to hunt down the razorback, Carl corners Dicko at the cannery when the razorback suddenly appears and mauls Dicko to death. The razorback then chases Carl into the factory until Sarah arrives and is seemingly killed by the boar.

The razorback continues to pursue Carl and damages the cannery's power plant, setting the production line in motion. Carl lures the boar onto a conveyor belt that throws it into a giant meat grinder. After shutting down the machinery, Carl finds and rescues Sarah, who had merely been knocked unconscious, and the two embrace.

== Cast ==
- Gregory Harrison as Carl Winters
- Arkie Whiteley as Sarah Cameron
- Bill Kerr as Jake Cullen
- Chris Haywood as Benny Baker
- David Argue as Dicko Baker
- Judy Morris as Beth Winters
- John Howard as Danny
- John Ewart as Turner
- Don Smith as Wallace
- Mervyn Drake as Andy
- Redmond Phillips as the Magistrate
- Alan Becher as Counsel (credited as Alan Beecher)
- Peter Schwarz as Lawyer (as Peter Schwartz)
- Beth Child as Louise Cullen
- Rick Kennedy as Farmer

== Production ==
Razorback was directed by Russell Mulcahy and mostly shot in Broken Hill, New South Wales. Director of photography Dean Semler was hired on the strength of his work in Mad Max 2. Some commentators have written that the film may have been inspired by the 1980 death of Azaria Chamberlain, whose mother was accused of murder after a dingo snatched the infant.

The razorback boar was an animatronic. Effects artist Bob McCarron designed a total of six boars for the film, one of which was designed to ram vehicles. The shoot used one of the first batches of a new fast film stock developed by Kodak, which resulted in quite high-resolution shots. Mulcahy originally considered Jeff Bridges for the role of Carl, but producer Hal McElroy thought he had too little international appeal.

In a shower scene, Arkie Whiteley was initially supposed to be replaced by a body double, but she ended up doing it herself.

== Release ==
Razorback was released in Australia on 19 April 1984, and grossed $801,000 at the box office. The film was given a limited release theatrical run in the US and UK by Warner Bros. Pictures on 16 November 1984. It grossed $150,140 at the box office in the United States.

Following various VHS video releases, the film was issued on DVD in Australia by Umbrella Entertainment on 21 September 2005. It was presented in 2.40:1 widescreen with a 5.1 Dolby Digital soundtrack and the original 2.0 Dolby Stereo soundtrack. Special features include the 70-minute featurette "Jaws on Trotters"; an audio interview with actor Gregory Harrison; four brief pre-release deleted scenes with extra gore, sourced from VHS tape; a photo gallery; and an original theatrical trailer.

Razorback was subsequently released on DVD in various other countries, including the US, UK, France and Germany, though they only contain varying quantities of the Australian disc's extras. The US release was by Warner Home Video, as part of the Warner Archive Collection, and only contains 2.0 stereo audio and the theatrical trailer.

In 2014, Umbrella Entertainment released the film on Blu-ray with all of the prior DVD's extras and an additional 84 minutes of cast and crew interviews.

In August 2018, Umbrella Entertainment released a newly remastered edition Blu-ray featuring a 4K remaster of the theatrical cut and a VHS-sourced version of the uncut film. In addition to porting over all previous supplements, newly produced extras include an audio commentary by director Russell Mulcahy and the retrospective "A Certain Piggish Nature: Looking Back at Razorback."

Umbrella Entertainment released a 4K remaster of the film on 26 July 2023.

== Reception ==
Razorback received mixed reviews from critics, with several critics comparing the film to Steven Spielberg's Jaws. On the review aggregator website Rotten Tomatoes, 58% of 12 critics' reviews are positive, with an average rating of 5.8/10.

Empire awarded the film two out of five stars, writing, "The oddball nightmare style is effective but the prop pig and under par acting let the film down." TV Guide also gave the film two out of five stars, commending the film's cinematography, but stated that the film was "too repetitive (and sometimes simply too silly) to be truly engaging". Variety gave the film a positive review, writing, "The plot may be a bit familiar, but Razorback is no quickie: it's an extremely handsome production, beautifully shot by Dean Semler."

=== Accolades ===
Award	Category	Subject	Result
Australian Film Institute Awards	Best Adapted Screenplay	Everett De Roche	Nominated
Australian Film Institute Awards	Best Cinematography	Dean Semler	Won
Australian Film Institute Awards	Best Editing	William M. Anderson	Won
Australian Film Institute Awards	Best Original Music Score	Iva Davies	Nominated
Australian Film Institute Awards	Best Sound	Tim Lloyd	Nominated
Australian Film Institute Awards	Best Sound	Ron Purvis	Nominated
Australian Film Institute Awards	Best Sound	Peter Fenton	Nominated
Australian Film Institute Awards	Best Sound	Phil Heywood	Nominated
Australian Film Institute Awards	Best Sound	Greg Bell	Nominated
Australian Film Institute Awards	Best Sound	Helen Brown	Nominated
Australian Film Institute Awards	Best Sound	Ashley Grenville	Nominated
Australian Film Institute Awards	Best Production Design	Bryce Walmsley	Nominated
Australian Cinematographers Society	Cinematographer of the Year	Dean Semler	Won
Avoriaz Fantastic Film Festival	Grand Prize	Russell Mulcahy	Nominated

== Legacy ==
The film has been referenced in the Australian video game Ty The Tasmanian Tiger, in which a monstrous boar named Bull is identified as a Razorback Pig

== See also ==
- Boar
- Chaw
- Pig Hunt
- Cinema of Australia
