= Angel Baby (1995 film) =

- Directed by: Michael Rymer
- Written by: Michael Rymer
- Produced by: Jonathan Shteinman; Timothy White
- Starring: John Lynch; Jacqueline McKenzie; Colin Friels; Deborra-Lee Furness; Daniel Daperis; Elise Mayberry; Adriana Xenides (as herself)
- Cinematography: Ellery Ryan
- Edited by: Dany Cooper
- Music by: Gavin Friday; Maurice Seezer; John Clifford White
- Distributed by: Southern Star Sales; Umbrella Entertainment
- Release date: 28 October 1995
- Running time: 105 minutes
- Country: Australia
- Language: English
- Budget: A$3.5 million
- Box office: A$1,070,726 (Australia)

Angel Baby is a 1995 Australian drama film written and directed by Michael Rymer and starring John Lynch, Jacqueline McKenzie and Colin Friels. The film was produced in 1993–94. It is a love story of two people with schizophrenia.

== Premise ==
Harry and Kate meet during therapy and fall passionately in love. They believe their love is so strong that it will allow them to go off their medication, and this is where their problems begin.

== Cast ==
- John Lynch as Harry
- Jacqueline McKenzie as Kate
- Colin Friels as Morris Goodman
- Deborra-Lee Furness as Louise Goodman
- Daniel Daperis as Sam Goodman
- Robyn Nevin as Dr. Norberg
- David Argue as Dave
- Samuel Johnson as Checkout cashier
- John Brumpton as Clubhouse client

== Awards ==
The film swept the boards at the 1995 AFI Awards winning all the major categories as well as several major international film festivals.

Year	Result	Award	Category/Recipient(s)
1995	Won	AACTA International Awards	Best Original Screenplay Michael Rymer
1995	Won	AACTA International Awards	Best Achievement in Directing Michael Rymer
1995	Won	Australian Film Institute	Best Achievement in Cinematography Ellery Ryan
1995	Won	Australian Film Institute	Best Achievement in Editing Dany Cooper
1995	Won	Australian Film Institute	Best Actor in a Lead Role John Lynch
1995	Won	Australian Film Institute	Best Actress in a Lead Role Jacqueline McKenzie
1995	Won	Australian Film Institute	Best Director Michael Rymer
1995	Won	Australian Film Institute	Best Film Timothy White Jonathan Shteinman
1995	Won	Australian Film Institute	Best Screenplay, Original Michael Rymer
1996	Won	Film Critics Circle of Australia Awards	Best Actor—Female Jacqueline McKenzie
1996	Won	Film Critics Circle of Australia Awards	Best Actor—Male John Lynch
1995	Won	Gijón International Film Festival	Best Director Michael Rymer
1995	Won	Human Rights and Equal Opportunity Commission Feature Film Award	presented to Timothy White and Jonathon Shteinman (producers), and Michael Rymer (writer/director)
1996	Won	Rotterdam International Film Festival	Audience Award Michael Rymer
1996	Won	Valenciennes International Festival of Action and Adventure Films	Best Actress Jacqueline McKenzie

=== Box office ===
Angel Baby grossed $1,070,726 at the box office in Australia.

== See also ==
- Wheel of Fortune (Australian game show) used as a plot element in this film.
