= Pruitt Taylor Vince =

American character actor (born 1960)

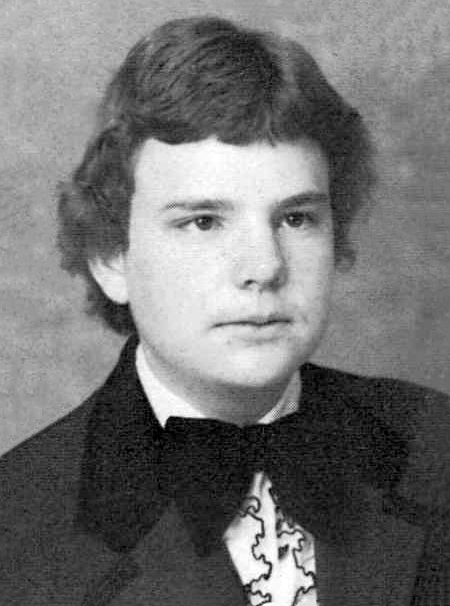
- Vince in 1978
- Born: July 5, 1960 (age 66); Baton Rouge, Louisiana, U.S.
- Education: Louisiana State University
- Occupation: Actor
- Years active: 1986–present
- Spouses: Anne Schneider (m. 1985, divorced) Julianne Mattelig (m. 2003, divorced)

Pruitt Taylor Vince (born July 5, 1960) is an American actor. Often classified as a character actor, he made his film debut with a supporting role in Angel Heart (1987) with his most famous role playing J.J. LaRoche in the series The Mentalist.

After supporting roles in the films Mississippi Burning (1988), Jacob's Ladder (1990), and Natural Born Killers (1994), alongside his portrayal of Lee Bowers in the political thriller film JFK (1991), Vince gained attention with his starring roles in the films Heavy (1995) and Beautiful Girls (1996). He had his breakout with a recurring role as Clifford Banks on season 2 of the ABC legal drama television series Murder One (1997), which earned him the Primetime Emmy Award for Outstanding Guest Actor in a Drama Series. Following his Murder One role, Vince had starring roles in the films The Legend of 1900 (1998) and Mumford (1999).

In the 2000s, Vince had starring roles in the films Nurse Betty (2000), Simone (2002), Trapped (2002), Identity (2003), Constantine (2005), and Captivity (2007). He had a recurring role as Mose Manuel on the HBO Western series Deadwood (2005–2006).

In the 2010s, Vince had starring roles in the films Flypaper (2011), 13 Sins (2014), The Devil's Candy (2017), and Bird Box (2018). He portrayed Angelo Ruggiero in the biographical crime film Gotti (2018). On television, he had recurring roles as J.J. LaRoche on the CBS series The Mentalist (2010–2013), Casper Abraham on the NBC series Heroes Reborn (2015), and Grill on the ABC superhero series Agents of S.H.I.E.L.D. (2017–2018). In the 2020s, he had a supporting role as Jonathan Kent in the superhero film Superman (2025) and a main role as Bob Bauer in the Apple TV+ miniseries Lady in the Lake (2024).

== Early life ==
Vince was born in Baton Rouge, Louisiana, on July 5, 1960. He attended Louisiana State University.

For most of his life, Vince has had a condition called nystagmus, the involuntary movement of the eye.

== Career ==
Vince made his film debut in Jim Jarmusch's Down by Law, but his scenes were edited out. He had prominent supporting roles in several major films, including a turn as a dimwitted Ku Klux Klan member in Mississippi Burning (1988), Lee Bowers in JFK (1991), and the main character's best friend in Nobody's Fool (1994). His first lead role was in James Mangold's independent film Heavy (1995), playing a sweet, silent overweight cook harboring a crush on a waitress played by Liv Tyler. He starred in Giuseppe Tornatore's film The Legend of 1900 (1998).

Vince often alternates between heroic and villainous characters. Vince played a Southern policeman in the neo-noir psychological horror film Angel Heart (1987), a kidnapper's assistant in the crime thriller film Trapped (2002), and a deputy prison warden in Oliver Stone's Natural Born Killers (1994). He played a lovable, small town pub owner in Beautiful Girls (1996); a mentally ill serial killer in the 2003 mystery thriller film Identity (a second collaboration with director Mangold); a pompous sheriff in Nurse Betty (2000); a gossip columnist in Simone (2002); and a dissolute Roman Catholic priest with psychic abilities in the 2005 supernatural horror film Constantine. He can also be seen in the dramatic film Love from Ground Zero (1998) playing as Walter. Other film titles include the psychological horror film Jacob's Ladder (1990), the neo-noir film China Moon (1994), the action thriller film Homefront (2013), and the supernatural horror film The Devil's Candy (2015).

Guest appearances on TV shows include Deadwood, Alias, The X-Files, Miami Vice, Quantum Leap, Chicago Hope, In the Heat of the Night, CSI: Crime Scene Investigation, Highlander: The Series, and the American remake of Touching Evil. In 2011, he appeared as Otis in the AMC television series The Walking Dead. He also had a guest role playing a 600 pounds (270 kg) patient in Fox's medical drama House. From 2010 to 2014, he had a multi-episode appearance in The Mentalist. In 2012, he appeared in a full episode of Justified. He took a comic role as "Jelly" in Flypaper. In 2018, he appeared on an episode of The Blacklist as Lawrence Devlin.

== Awards ==
Vince received an Emmy Award, in 1997, for Guest Actor in a Drama Series for his role as serial killer Clifford Banks during the second season of the television series Murder One.

== Filmography ==
=== Film ===
Year	Film	Role	Notes
1986	Down by Law		(scenes deleted), First role
1987	Angel Heart	Det. Deimos	
1987	Shy People	Paul	
1987	Barfly	Joe	
1988	Red Heat	Night Clerk	
1988	Mississippi Burning	Lester Cowens	
1989	K-9	Benny the Mule	
1989	Homer and Eddie	Cashier	
1990	Wild at Heart	Buddy	
1990	Fear	Shadow Man	
1990	Come See the Paradise	Augie Farrell	
1990	Jacob's Ladder	Paul	
1991	JFK	Lee Bowers	
1994	China Moon	Daryl Jeeters	
1994	City Slickers II: The Legend of Curly's Gold	Bud	
1994	Natural Born Killers	Deputy Warden Kavanaugh	
1994	Nobody's Fool	Rub Squeers	
1995	Heavy	Victor Modino	
1995	Under the Hula Moon	Bob	
1996	The Cottonwood	Mark Salli	
1996	Beautiful Girls	Stanley 'Stinky' Womack	
1997	The End of Violence	Frank Cray	
1997	A Further Gesture	Scott	
1997	Cold Around the Heart	Johnny 'Cokebottles' Costello	
1998	Dr. Dolittle	Patient at Hammersmith	Uncredited
1998	The Legend of 1900	Max Tooney	
1998	Love from Ground Zero	Walter	
1999	Mumford	Henry Follett	
2000	Nurse Betty	Ballard	
2000	The Cell	Dr. Reid	
2001	Mental Hygiene	Mr. Adams	Short
2002	13 Moons	Owen	
2002	Rebellion	Vito	
2002	S1m0ne	Max Sayer	
2002	Trapped	Marvin	
2002	Trapped from Within	Himself	Video documentary short
2003	Identity	Malcolm Rivers	
2003	Monster	Gene / Stuttering "John"	
2005	Constantine	Father Hennessey	
2005	Drop Dead Sexy	Spider	
2005	Nobody Wants Your Film	Himself	Documentary
2007	When a Man Falls in the Forest	Travis	
2007	Captivity	Ben Dexter	
2008	The Echo	Joseph	
2009	The Smell of Success	Cleveland Clod	
2009	In the Electric Mist	Lou Girard	
2009	Don McKay	Mel	
2009	Leaves of Grass	Big Joe Sharpe	
2011	Stanley DeBrock	Earl Wayne	
2011	Flypaper	Wyatt 'Jelly' Jenkins	
2011	Cameraman	Jeremy	
2011	Drive Angry	Roy	
2011	On the Inside	Ben Marshal	
2011	Butter	Ned Eaten	
2011	Creature	Grover	
2012	Bending the Rules	Happy	
2012	Jules Verne's Mysterious Island	Gideon Spilett	
2012	Brake	Driver / Boss Terrorist (voice)	
2013	Broken Blood	Earl Wayne	
2013	The Making of Broken Blood	Himself	Video documentary short
2013	Homefront	Werks	
2013	Dark Tourist	Carl Marznap	
2013	Beautiful Creatures	Mr. Lee	
2013	13 Sins	Vogler	
2015	The Devil's Candy	Ray Smilie	
2016	59 Seconds	Robert	
2018	Gotti	Angelo Ruggiero	
2018	ASIA A	Noah	Short
2018	Bird Box	Rick	
2021	Crime Story	Tommy	
2025	Superman	Jonathan Kent	
TBA	Reckoning †	Tommy	Post-production

=== Television ===
Year	Film	Role	Notes
1988	Miami Vice	Cruz	Episode: "Bad Timing"
1989	I Know My First Name is Steven	Irving Murphy	TV movie
1990	In the Heat of the Night	Leonard Grissom	Episode: "Perversions of Justice"
1991	Sweet Poison	Coyle	TV movie
1991	Dead in the Water	Lou Rescetti	TV movie
1992	Till Death Us Do Part	Michael Brockington	TV movie
1992	Quantum Leap	Hank Pilcher	Episode: "Moments to Live - May 4, 1985"
1993	Sisters	Joe Abruzzia	Episode: "Things Are Tough All Over"
1995	Chicago Hope	Walter Platt	Episode: "Small Sacrifices"
1995	The Marshal	Two-Cats	Episode: "Buy Hard"
1995	Highlander	Mikey	Episode: "The Innocent"
1996	The X-Files	Gerry Schnauz	Episode: "Unruhe"
1997	Night Sins	Olie Swain	TV movie
1997	Murder One: Diary of a Serial Killer	Clifford Banks	TV mini-series
1997	Murder One	Clifford Banks	6 episodes
2001	Gideon's Crossing	James Tooley	Episode: "The Lottery"
2001	Thieves	Roy Lichter	Episode: "Dey Got De Degas"
2003	L.A. Confidential	Sid Hudgens	TV movie
2003	The Handler	Ray / Sergei	Episode: "Street Boss"
2003	Alias	Campbell / Schapker	Episode: "Breaking Point"
2004	Touching Evil	Cyril Kemp	5 episodes
2004	CSI: Crime Scene Investigation	Marty Gleason	Episode: "Swap Meet"
2005–2006	Deadwood	Mose Manuel	10 episodes
2006	House	George	Episode: "Que Sera Sera"
2008	Canterbury's Law	Louis Minot	Episode: "Baggage"
2010	Infamous	The Patriarch	3 episodes, also director
2010	Memphis Beat	Martin Matthews	Episode: "I Want to Be Free"
2010–2013	The Mentalist	J.J. LaRoche	12 episodes
2011	The Cape	Goggles	Episode: "Goggles and Hicks"
2011	The Walking Dead	Otis	3 episodes
2012	Justified	Glen Fogle	Episode: "Harlan Roulette"
2012	Bones	Haze Jackson	Episode: "The Prisoner in the Pipe"
2012	Hawaii Five-0	Richard Branche	Episode: "Ha'alele"
2014	True Blood	Finn	5 episodes
2015	Heroes Reborn	Casper Abraham	7 episodes
2017	Stranger Things	Ray Carroll	2 episodes
2017–2018	Agents of S.H.I.E.L.D.	Grill	Recurring; 4 episodes
2018	The Blacklist	Lawrence Devlin	2 episodes
2024	Lady in the Lake	Bob Bauer	Miniseries

== Accolades ==
Year	Award	Category	Nominated work	Result
1997	Primetime Emmy Awards	Outstanding Guest Actor in a Drama Series	Murder One	Won
1997	Viewers for Quality Television Awards	Best Recurring Player	Murder One	Won
