= And Millions Will Die =

- Also known as: ...And Millions Will Die!
- Genre: Thriller
- Written by: Michael Fisher
- Directed by: Leslie H. Martinson
- Starring: Richard Basehart; Susan Strasberg; Leslie Nielsen; Joseph Fürst; Rowena Wallace
- Music by: Laurie Lewis
- Countries of origin: Australia; United States
- Original language: English

Production
- Executive producer: Charles B. Walnizer
- Producer: Mende Brown
- Production locations: Hong Kong; Sydney
- Cinematography: Paul Onorato
- Editor: Richard Hindley
- Running time: 93 min.
- Production companies: Australian Amalgamated Pictures; Allied Artists Pictures

Original release
- Network: CBS
- Release: 1973

...And Millions Will Die! (aka "And Millions Die") is a 1973 Australian television film directed by Leslie H. Martinson. It was shot in Hong Kong.

== Premise ==
Nazi war criminal Franz Kessler (Joseph Fürst), a wealthy germ warfare expert living in Hong Kong, plants a gas-filled time bomb under the city sewers.

== Cast ==
- Richard Basehart as Dr. Douglas Pruitt
- Susan Strasberg as Heather Kessler
- Peter Sumner as Dixie Hart
- Joseph Fürst as Franz Kessler
- Alwyn Kurts as Dr. Mitchell
- Shariff Medan as Postman
- Leslie Nielsen as Jack Gallagher
- Rowena Wallace as Maggi Christopher
- Willie Fennell as Sid Broomberg
- Les Foxcroft as Henshaw

== Production ==
The film was a feature-length pilot for a proposed television series called "E-Force", about a crack environmental detective unit trying to track down those responsible for a poison gas attack. The villain Kessler was played by Viennese-born actor Joseph Furst, who was a regular on Australian TV and films. Make-up artist Pat Hutchence is the mother of the late INXS frontman Michael Hutchence.
