= Russell Crowe filmography =

List of films featuring Russell Crowe

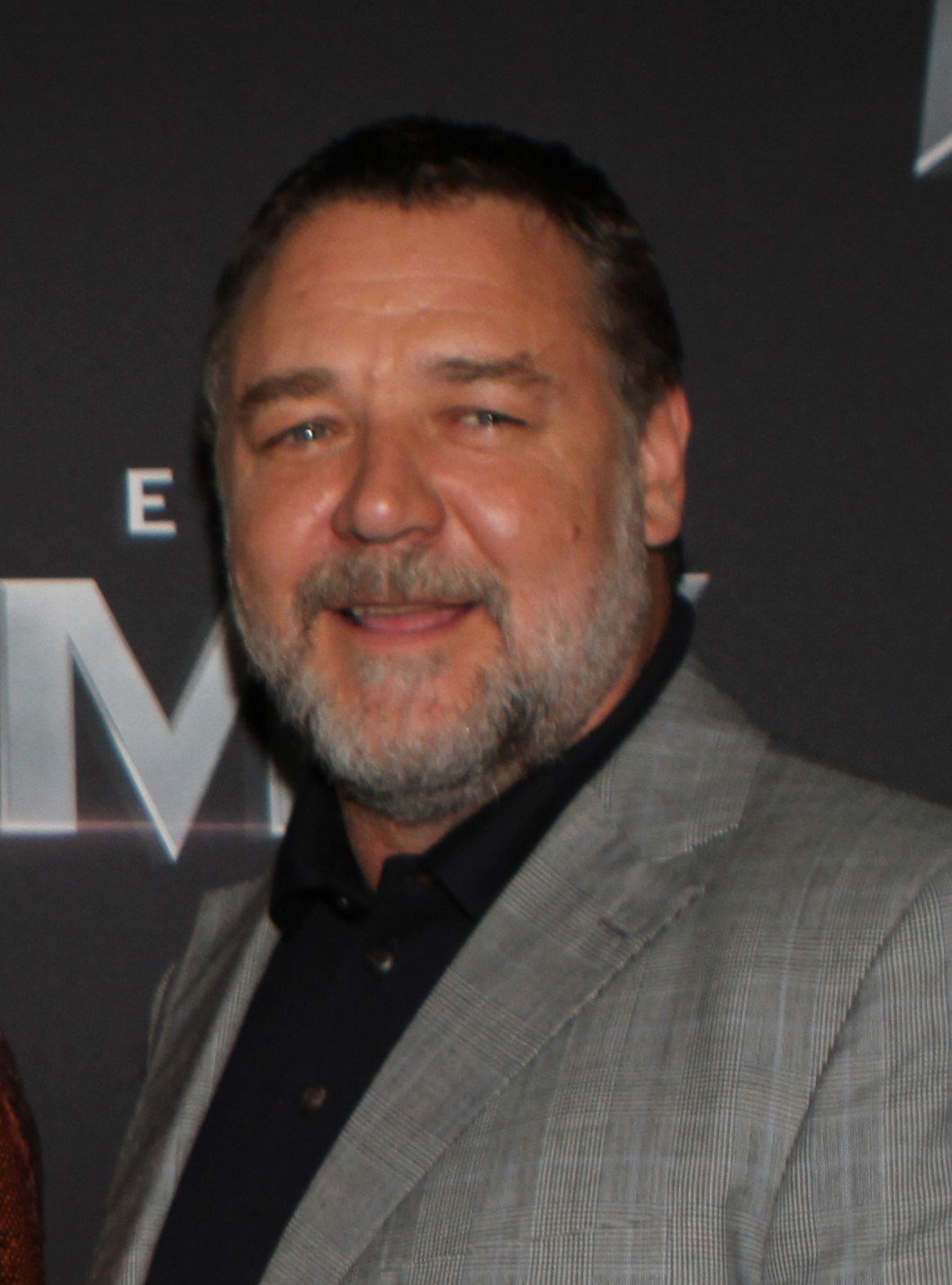
- Crowe in 2017
- Film: 61
- Television series: 12
- Documentary: 1

Russell Crowe is a New Zealand-born actor and film director. He gained international attention for his role as Roman General Maximus Decimus Meridius in the 2000 epic historical film Gladiator, for which he won an Academy Award for Best Actor. Crowe's other performances include tobacco firm whistle-blower Jeffrey Wigand in the drama film The Insider (1999) and mathematician John Forbes Nash Jr. in the biopic A Beautiful Mind (2001). He has also starred in films Romper Stomper with Daniel Pollock (1992), The Quick and the Dead with Sharon Stone (1995), L.A. Confidential with Guy Pearce (1997), Master and Commander: The Far Side of the World with Paul Bettany (2003), Cinderella Man with Renée Zellweger (2005), 3:10 to Yuma with Christian Bale (2007), American Gangster with Denzel Washington (2007), State of Play with Ben Affleck (2009), and Robin Hood with Cate Blanchett (2010).

Crowe later starred in the 2012 musical drama Les Misérables, as Jor-El in the 2013 superhero epic Man of Steel, the 2014 biblical fantasy drama Noah, and the 2016 action comedy The Nice Guys. In 2014, he made his directorial debut with the drama The Water Diviner, in which he also starred. He has earned various accolades, including a star on the Hollywood Walk of Fame, two Golden Globe Awards, a British Academy Film Award, and an Academy Award out of three consecutive nominations (1999, 2000, and 2001).

== Film ==
Year	Title	Role	Notes	Ref(s)
1990	Prisoners of the Sun	Lt. Jack Corbett		
1990	The Crossing	Johnny Ryan		
1991	Proof	Andy		
1991	Spotswood	Kim Barry		
1992	Romper Stomper	Hando		
1993	Hammers Over the Anvil	East Driscoll		
1993	The Silver Brumby	The Man (Egan)		
1993	For the Moment	Lachlan Currie		
1993	Love in Limbo	Arthur Baskin		
1994	The Sum of Us	Jeff Mitchell		
1995	The Quick and the Dead	Cort		
1995	No Way Back	FBI Agent Zack Grant		
1995	Virtuosity	SID 6.7		
1995	Rough Magic	Alex Ross		
1997	L.A. Confidential	Officer Wendell "Bud" White		
1997	Heaven's Burning	Colin O'Brien		
1997	Breaking Up	Steve		
1999	Mystery, Alaska	Sheriff John Biebe		
1999	The Insider	Jeffrey Wigand		
2000	Gladiator	Maximus Decimus Meridius		
2000	Proof of Life	Terry Thorne		
2001	A Beautiful Mind	John Nash		
2003	Master and Commander: The Far Side of the World	Captain Jack Aubrey		
2005	Cinderella Man	Jim Braddock		
2006	A Good Year	Max Skinner		
2007	Bra Boys: Blood Is Thicker than Water	Narrator	Documentary Film	
2007	3:10 to Yuma	Ben Wade		
2007	American Gangster	Det. Richie Roberts		
2008	Body of Lies	Ed Hoffman		
2009	Tenderness	Detective Cristofuoro		
2009	State of Play	Cal McAffrey		
2010	Robin Hood	Robin Longstride	Also producer	
2010	The Next Three Days	John Brennan		
2012	The Man with the Iron Fists	Jacknife		
2012	Les Misérables	Inspector Javert		
2013	Broken City	Nicholas Hostetler		
2013	Man of Steel	Jor-El		
2013	Red Obsession	Narrator	Documentary film	
2014	Winter's Tale	Pearly Soames / Demon		
2014	Noah	Noah		
2014	The Water Diviner	Joshua Connor	Also director, directorial debut	
2015	Fathers and Daughters	Jake Davis	Also executive producer	
2016	The Nice Guys	Jackson Healy		
2017	War Machine	Bob White	Uncredited cameo	
2017	The Mummy	Dr. Henry Jekyll / Mr. Edward "Eddie" Hyde		
2018	Turtle Odyssey	Narrator	Documentary film	
2018	Boy Erased	Marshall Eamons		
2019	True History of the Kelly Gang	Harry Power		
2020	Unhinged	Tom Cooper	Credited as The Man	
2021	Zack Snyder's Justice League	Jor-El	Uncredited	
2022	Thor: Love and Thunder	Zeus		
2022	Prizefighter: The Life of Jem Belcher	Jack Slack		
2022	The Greatest Beer Run Ever	Arthur Coates		
2022	Poker Face	Jake Foley	Also director and writer	
2023	The Pope's Exorcist	Father Gabriele Amorth		
2024	Land of Bad	Captain Eddie Grimm "Reaper"		
2024	Sleeping Dogs	Roy Freeman		
2024	The Exorcism	Anthony Miller		
2024	Gladiator II	Maximus Decimus Meridius	Archive footage only	
2024	Kraven the Hunter	Nikolai Kravinoff		
2025	Nuremberg	Hermann Göring		
2026	The Weight	Clancy		
2026	Beast	Sammy	Also writer and executive producer	
2026	The Get Out	Marco Kapak		
2026	What Love Builds	Himself	Also director, writer and producer, documentary film	
2026	Unabomber	Henry Murray		
2027	The Last Druid †	TBD	Post-production	
TBD	Billion Dollar Spy †	Adolf Tolkachev	Post-production	
TBD	Highlander †	Juan Sánchez-Villalobos Ramírez	Filming	

Key
†	Denotes films that have not yet been released

== Television ==
Year	Title	Role	Notes	Ref(s)
1972	Spyforce	Orphan	Episode: "The Saviour: Part 2"	
1977	The Young Doctors	Russell	Episode #1.83	
1987	Rafferty's Rules	Bobby Jarvis	Episode: "Suspicious Minds"	
1987	Neighbours	Kenny Larkin	4 episodes	
1991	Brides of Christ	Dominic Maloney	Episode: "Rosemary"	
1991	Acropolis Now	Danny O' Brian	Episode: "Teenage Mutant Ninja Greeks"	
1992	Police Rescue	Tom 'Bomber' Young	Episode: "The Right Stuff"	
1992	The Late Show	Shirty the Slightly Aggressive Bear	1 episode	
2004	Colour of War: The Anzacs	Narrator	3 episodes	
2007	South Side Story	Himself	6 episodes	
2012	Republic of Doyle	Boyd Keiley	Episode: "Streets of John's"	
2016	Saturday Night Live	Himself (host)	Episode: "Russell Crowe/Margo Price"	
2018	Last Week Tonight with John Oliver	Himself	Episode: "Authoritarianism"	
2019	The Loudest Voice	Roger Ailes	Miniseries, 7 episodes, also executive producer	
2019–20	Take Us Home: Leeds United	Narrator	Documentary, 8 episodes	
2021	Great Barrier Reef: A Living Treasure	Narrator	Documentary, 4 episodes	
2024	Ark: The Animated Series	Kor the Prophet	Voice role, episode: "Element 6"	
