= Lover Boy (1989 film) =

1989 Australian short film

- DVD cover
- Directed by: Geoffrey Wright
- Written by: Geoffrey Wright
- Starring: Noah Taylor
- Cinematography: Michael Williams
- Edited by: Grant Fenn
- Music by: John Clifford White
- Production company: Seon Film Productions
- Distributed by: Subversive Cinema
- Release date: 17 August 1989
- Running time: 58 minutes
- Country: Australia
- Language: English

Lover Boy is a 1989 Australian romantic drama film directed by Geoffrey Wright. It stars Noah Taylor and Gillian Jones.

== Plot ==
In the western suburbs of Melbourne, shy teenage misfit Mick (Noah Taylor) is volunteered by his mother to mow the lawns of her friend Sally (Gillian Jones). Mick and Sally soon become lovers, drawn to each other for different reasons – Mick from typical adolescent sexuality and Sally from desperate loneliness. The relationship leads to conflict and eventually violence.

== Cast ==
- Noah Taylor as Mick
- Gillian Jones as Sally
- Ben Mendelsohn as Gazza
- Alice Garner as Rhonda
- Daniel Pollock as Duck
- Peter Hosking as Lex

== Home media ==
Lover Boy and the David Swann short film Bonza were released as a double feature VHS tape in 1989. Lover Boy was a special feature on the DVD release of Wright's 1994 film Metal Skin.

== Novelisation ==
The novelisation of Lover Boy was written by Jocelyn Harewood and published by Text Publishing in 1994. It explores the conflicting worlds of a teenager and a mature woman as they discover the full force of their sexuality. The joy this brings soon turns to torment and violence. Harewood follows the film closely. However she also develops the characters, so the reader can empathise with their attitudes and behaviour. Lover Boy, the book, was published as an e-book in November 2012.
