= Daniel Pollock =

Australian actor (1968–1992)

- Born: Daniel John Pollock; 24 August 1968; Melbourne, Victoria, Australia
- Died: 13 April 1992 (aged 23); Sydney, New South Wales, Australia
- Education: Wesley College; St Martins Youth Arts Centre; Swinburne Film and Television School
- Occupation: Actor
- Years active: 1982–1992
- Known for: Romper Stomper (1992)

Daniel John Pollock (24 August 1968 – 13 April 1992) was an Australian film actor. He was perhaps best known for his role as Davey in the 1992 drama film Romper Stomper.

== Early life ==
Pollock was born in Melbourne, Victoria, the son of John Pollock, an architect and his wife Lucy, a teacher. He was the eldest of three children.

Pollock spent his childhood in Albert Park, where he attended kindergarten and primary school, before studying at Wesley College. Struggling to fit in, he then moved to Swinburne Alternative School. Around this time he developed an interest in acting. He trained at St Martins Youth Arts Centre, where he appeared in 11 productions, before making a series of films with the Swinburne Film and Television School.

== Career ==
After his early experience in student productions, Pollock landed a leading role in a 1988 film adaptation of Christopher Koch’s novel, Boys in the Island. He hoped it would be his big break, but ultimately the film was not released.

From there, Pollock appeared in 1989 romantic drama film Loverboy with Noah Taylor, 1990 crime comedy Nirvana Street Murder opposite Ben Mendelsohn and 1990 black comedy/romance Death in Brunswick with Sam Neill and Zoe Carides. He also had roles in 1989 crime miniseries The Magistrate and 1990 police drama series Skirts. He then played the small but pivotal role of Gary in 1991 romantic comedy/drama Proof, with Hugo Weaving and Russell Crowe.

Pollock's final performance was alongside Russell Crowe in the 1992 drama film Romper Stomper, in which he played the role of Davey, a neo-Nazi skinhead. Director Geoffrey Wright had directed him in his previous film project Loverboy, and impressed by Pollock's performance, cast him in Romper Stomper. Pollock was posthumously nominated for Best Supporting Actor at the 1992 AFI Awards for his performance in the film, but lost to Barry Otto for his role in Strictly Ballroom.

== Personal life ==
When Pollock was 18, he was involved in a car accident. Having had his driver's licence for a few short months, he offered to drive several friends home from a party, but after too much to drink he lost control of the car, and plunged into the Yarra River, killing one of his friends. His mother said: "The car accident was very tragic. He felt responsible. I believe that was what started him using heroin." Pollock frequently tried to shake his drug habit, enrolling in Methadone programs and checking into detox centres, but he never stayed long enough to be rehabilitated.

Pollock met actress Jacqueline McKenzie on the set of Romper Stomper, and the onscreen couple began dating off-screen. After filming wrapped in September 1991, the couple relocated to Sydney in December of that year. McKenzie did her best to help Pollock kick drugs, but his addiction ultimately resulted in their break up.

Pollock lived in backpacker hostels near Kings Cross, homeless people’s refuges and parks, and continued to abuse drugs. He struggled to secure acting work and during his last few weeks in Sydney, his agent had suspended him until he dealt with his drug problem. He was also struggling to recover from the break-up with McKenzie and he had been stabbed by a drug dealer. He frequently borrowed money and stole, and the police traced some stolen goods back to him, resulting in charges. Pleading guilty, he was required to attend a detox centre, after which time he was due to appear at a hearing, on 29 April 1992. He was terrified of being sent to jail, and told his parents that he would kill himself if he was put behind bars.

== Death ==
Pollock died on 13 April 1992 in Newtown, Sydney, at the age of 23. The cause of death was suicide by rail. While he was identified by the police within a couple of days, it was two weeks before his family was notified of his death. He was buried next to his grandfather William 'Bill' Pollock in Gol Gol, New South Wales.

He died before the release of Romper Stomper. His co-star from the film, Russell Crowe and his rock band 30 Odd Foot of Grunts wrote a song in 2001 called "The Night That Davey Hit the Train", about Pollock's death.

== Filmography ==
=== Film ===
Year	Title	Role	Notes	Ref
	The Wood Chopper		Swinburne film	
1987	Tax		Swinburne film	
	Andy Caltex Hits the Road		Swinburne film	
1988	Salt, Saliva, Sperm and Sweat	Worker #4		
1988	Boys in the Island	Jake Brodie		
1989	Lover Boy	Duck		
1990	Nirvana Street Murder	Derek		
1991	Death in Brunswick	Junkie		
1991	Proof	Gary (punk)		
1992	Romper Stomper	Davey		

=== Television ===
Year	Title	Role	Notes	Ref
1989	The Magistrate	Randy	Miniseries, 2 episodes	
1990	Skirts			
1992	Kelly	Dognapper	1 episode	

== Theatre ==
Year	Title	Role	Notes	Ref
1982–1984	The Cobra	Veritas	Sydney Theatre Company, Sydney Opera House, Melbourne Athenaeum	
