= Tony Le-Nguyen =

Australian actor, filmmaker and teacher(born 1968)

Tony Le Nguyen
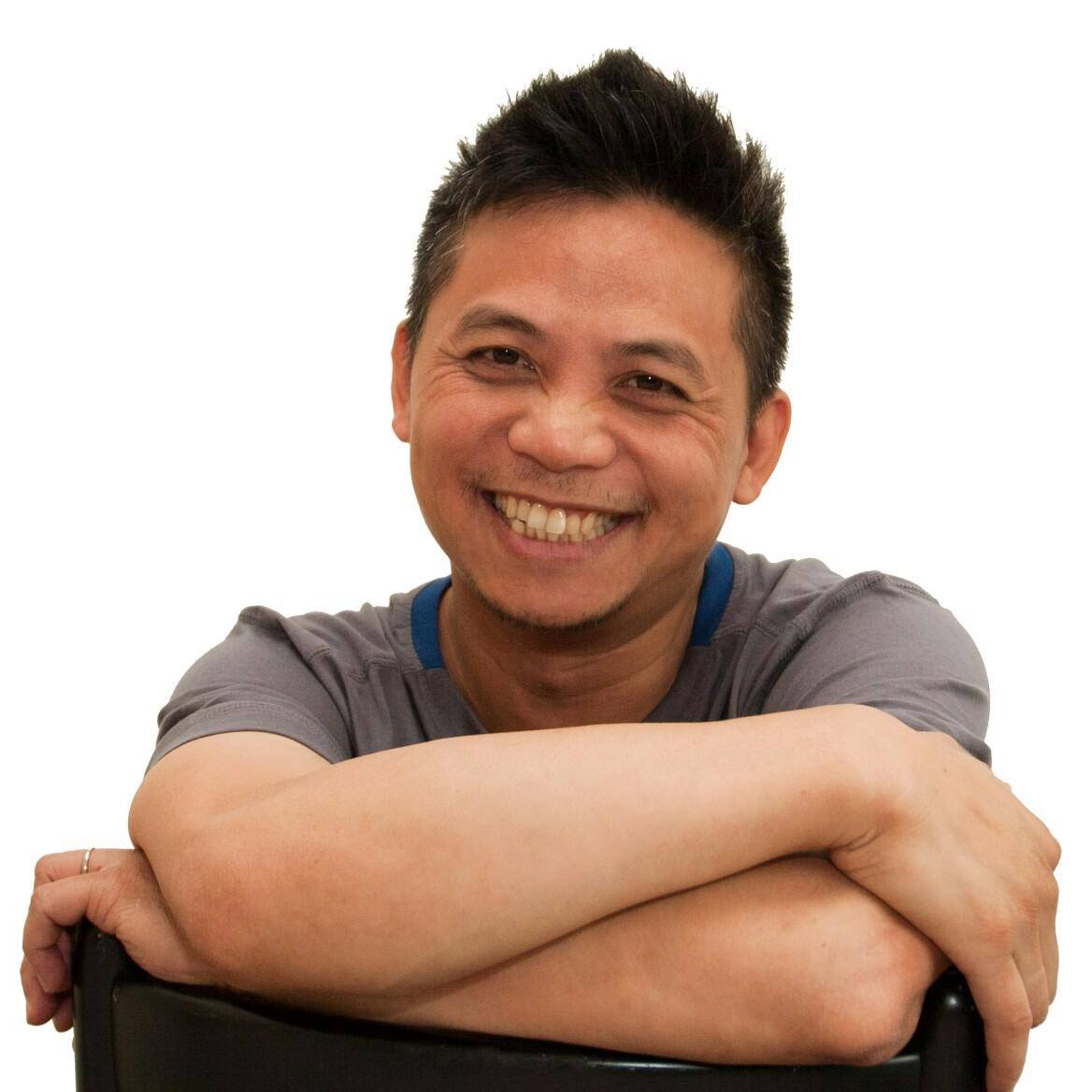
- Born: Lê Thiện Toàn; 3 October 1968 (age 57); Sa Đéc, Mekong Delta, Vietnam
- Occupations: Actor, filmmaker, teacher
- Years active: 1985–present

Tony Le Nguyen is a Vietnamese-Australian actor, film-maker and teacher. Le-Nguyen is perhaps best known for his role as Tiger in the 1992 Australian drama film Romper Stomper.

== Early life ==
Le Nguyen was born in as Lê Thiện ToànSa Đéc, Mekong Delta, Vietnam on 3 October 1968. In 1978, Le-Nguyen and his family migrated from Vietnam to Melbourne, Victoria, Australia, as refugees, when he was ten years old. In 1985 he changed his name to Tony Lee as he began working as an actor.

== Career ==
Le Nguyen is the first Vietnamese-Australian to be appointed as an Official Prison Visitor to Port Phillip and Fulham Correctional Centres by the Minister for Corrections, the Honourable Andre Haermeyer in 2003 to act as an independent voice for the prison system in Victoria.

Le Nguyen played Tiger in Geoffrey Wright’s 1992 Australian drama film Romper Stomper. He has also appeared in other television productions including: Stingers, SeaChange, Raw FM, G.P., Fast Forward, All Together Now, Embassy, Secrets, The Damnation of Harvey McHugh, Paradise Beach, Australia’s most wanted & Sword of Honour

Between 1986 and 1987, Le Nguyen toured with Mary Coustas in Handspan Theatre’s production A Change of Face written by Andrea Lemon and directed by Carmelina di Guglielmo. He worked on the Victorian Opera 1990 production of Madama Butterfly and performed in Theatreworks 1993 production of Titus, directed by David Pledger and Robert Draffin.

In May 1994, he founded Australian Vietnamese Youth Media with the support of Huu Tran and David Everist, the theatre coordinator at the Footscray Community Arts Centre. The company received its first funding from the Queens Trust in 1995 to produce Chay Vong Vong, a play he wrote and directed with the Vietnamese Community in Footscray, Melbourne. The following year, this organisation received funding from the Australia Council for the Arts and the Sidney Myer Foundation to re-stage Chay Vong Vong as a fully professional production at the Napier Street Theatre, in South Melbourne. In 1998 he was commissioned by Urban Theatre Projects to write and direct "Chay Vong Vong" with the Vietnamese Community in Sydney, Australia.

Le Nguyen has directed and produced such professional and community productions as A Time of Your Life, St. Martins Youth Theatre and Flemington Community Centre 1996, Now I Lay Me Down, La Mama 1997, Taboo, Next Wave Festival 1998, "Aussie Bia Om, 2001 Fringe Festival and directed segments for the BigWest Festival in 1997 and 2000, Children of the Dragon 2005, Silent 2007 He co-directed Worlds Apart in 1996 with Gary McKechnie, a half-hour Television drama about generation conflict within a Vietnamese Australian family. Worlds Apart was first screened on SBS Television in December 1997.

Le Nguyen began teaching drama at Blackbox, Hanoi in December 2013 and directed his first Vietnamese 30-minute drama "Mơ Chua" (Sour Apricots) in 2015. He is the director of The Drama Lab, Hanoi which he founded in 2021 and currently teaching life-skills using drama for KOTO, a not-for-profit social enterprise that empowers at-risk and disadvantaged youth in Vietnam founded by Jimmy Pham.

== Education ==
Le Nguyen studied Television Production at RMIT in 1989 and completed his Bachelor of Arts (Drama/Community Development) in 1998 and Diploma of Education in 2000 at Victoria University.

== Awards ==
He was awarded the Community Cultural Development Fellowship by the Australia Council for the Arts in 2000.

He was inducted into the 2024 Victoria Multicultural Honour Roll by the Victorian Multicultural Commission

== Filmography ==
=== Films ===
- Romper Stomper (1992)
- A Royal Commission Into the Australian Economy (1993) (TV film)

=== TV series ===
- Sword of Honour (1986) (1 episode)
- Embassy (1990) (1 episode)
- Boys from the Bush (1991)
- All Together Now (1991) (1 episode)
- English at Work (1991) (1 episode)
- Paradise Beach (1993) (1 episode)
- Secrets (1994) (1 episode)
- The Damnation of Harvey McHugh (1994) (1 episode)
- G.P. (1995) (1 episode)
- Raw FM (1997) (1 episode)
- Stingers (2000) (1 episode)
- SeaChange (2000) (1 episode)
