= The Magistrate (miniseries) =

- Written by: Chris Warner
- Directed by: Kathy Mueller
- Starring: Franco Nero; Catherine Wilkin; Julia Blake; Steve Bastoni
- Countries of origin: Australia; Italy
- Original language: English
- No. of episodes: 6 x 1 hour

Production
- Producers: Kim Dalton; Chris Warner

Original release
- Release: 15 November – 17 November 1989

The Magistrate is a 1989 mini series about an Italian investigative magistrate fighting the Mafia. His search causes the death of his wife and the disappearance of his son. The crimes lead him to Australia, where he discovers a landscape of political and police corruption, business fraud, media intrigue, drugs smuggling and illegal arms dealing which stretches all the way from Italy to Australia and into the Pacific.

== Cast ==
- Franco Nero as Paolo Pizzi
- Catherine Wilkin as Claire Boyd
- Dennis Miller as Roger Davies
- Julia Blake as Jean Shaw
- Steve Bastoni as Robbie Shaw
- Victoria Rowland as Nicole Davidson
- Joe Petruzzi as Leonardo Pizzi
- Paul Sonkkila as Hannaford
- Andy Anderson as Tony
- Caroline Gillmer as Sandy
- Rod Mullinar as Ian Walters
- Anthony Hawkins as Douglas Shaw
- Jon Fabian as Francesco Pinneri
- Steve Jacobs as Wetherby
- Khym Lam as Passport Officer
- Bud Tingwell as Prologue narrator
- Daniel Pollock as Randy
- Peter Hosking as Jeremy
