= Romper Stomper (TV series) =

Australian television series

- Genre: Crime drama; Political thriller
- Based on: Romper Stomper
- Written by: Geoffrey Wright; James Napier Robertson; Omar Musa; Malcolm Knox
- Directed by: Geoffrey Wright; Daina Reid; James Napier Robertson
- Starring: David Wenham; Dan Wyllie; Lachy Hulme; Sophie Lowe; Jacqueline McKenzie; Toby Wallace
- Country of origin: Australia
- Original language: English
- No. of seasons: 1
- No. of episodes: 6

Production
- Producers: John Edwards; Dan Edwards
- Production company: Roadshow Rough Diamond

Original release
- Network: Stan
- Release: 1 January 2018

Romper Stomper is an Australian television drama series that was released on video streaming service Stan on 1 January 2018. It is created as a sequel to the 1992 film of the same title and is set 25 years after the events in the film. The six-part series follows a new generation of fictional far-left activists and their far-right counterparts, with the story focusing on a fictional far-right anti-Islamic group led by Blake Farron (Lachy Hulme) known as Patriot Blue. Jacqueline McKenzie, Dan Wyllie and John Brumpton reprise their roles from the original film.

The series is produced by John Edwards and Dan Edwards for Roadshow Rough Diamond. The original film's director, Geoffrey Wright, directs two episodes, alongside fellow directors Daina Reid and James Napier Robertson. The series was commissioned by Stan in January 2017, and was filmed in Melbourne across 9 weeks in August.

== Cast ==
Main characters

- Toby Wallace as Kane, a young man who becomes involved with the Patriot Blue group
- Sophie Lowe as Zoe, Farron's wife
- Lachy Hulme as Blake Farron, leader of right-wing group Patriot Blue
- Nicole Chamoun as Laila Taheer, a young Muslim law student
- Julian Maroun as Farid, Laila's boyfriend
- Jamie Abdallah as Malik, Farid's brother, an MMA fighter
- Markella Kavenagh as Cindi, Kane's foster sister who escapes from juvenile detention
- Jeremy Lindsay Taylor as Marco, an Australian Federal Police officer who is having an affair with Gabe
- Kaden Hartcher as Stix, Kane's friend
- Lily Sullivan as Petra, a leader of the anti-fascist group Antifasc
- Tysan Towney as Danny, a lead member of Antifasc
- Louis Corbett as Tomas, a member of Antifasc
- David Wenham as Jago Zoric, a right-wing talk-show host
- Dan Wyllie as Vic "Cackles" Waters, reprising his role from the original film
- Jacqueline McKenzie as Gabrielle "Gabe" Jordan, Kane's mother, reprising her role from the original film

Recurring cast

- John Brumpton as Magoo Anderson, reprising his role from the original film
- Cliff Ellen as Martin Jordan, Gabe's father, replacing Alex Scott from the original film
- Fletcher Humphrys as Lyno, member of the Patriot Blue group who suspects Kane and Zoe's affair
- Sam Parsonson as Noddy, member of the Patriot Blue group
- Syd Zygier as Maeve, member of Antifasc
- Philip Hayden as McKew, Laila's university lecturer who is involved with Antifasc
- Simon Palomares as Senator George Anabasis, Petra's uncle

== Release ==
All six episodes of the series became available on Stan on 1 January 2018. International broadcast rights for the series covering Asia, parts of Europe, Latin America and northern Africa were sold to SundanceTV Global.

== Episodes ==
No.	Title	Directed by	Written by	Original release date
1	"Arrival"	Geoffrey Wright	Geoffrey Wright	1 January 2018
Kane and his friend Stix rescue Blake Farron, leader of far-right group Patriot Blue, when he comes under attack from an anti-fascist group while protesting at a halal festival in St Kilda. A woman at the festival, Laila Taheer, risks being targeted when she speaks out against Farron on the TV news. A grateful Blake takes the boys under his wing, offering them jobs as truck drivers for his recycling business. Kane begins an affair with Blake's wife, Zoe, and bashes her former partner who pimped her out for drug money before she met Blake. Kane's sister, Cindi, escapes with two friends from a juvenile detention centre. Kane later approaches his mother, Gabe Jordan, saying he knows who his father is.
2	"If Blood Should Stain the Wattle"	Geoffrey Wright	James Napier Robertson	1 January 2018
Cindi and her friends are pursued by the police after trying to hijack a car—the other two are arrested, but Cindi escapes and spends the night on the streets. Laila receives a phone call from talk show host Jago Zoric, who asks her to be a guest on his program, No Quarter. She agrees, but is surprised to find Blake also a guest, and shocked as Jago turns on her accusing her of supporting Islamic terrorism. Kane suggests Patriot Blue form night patrols to protect white people from those they consider "scum". One morning they pursue a purse snatcher, who turns out to be Kane's sister, Cindi.
3	"Poetry"	James Napier Robertson	Malcolm Knox	1 January 2018
Cindi becomes involved with Antifasc after eating at their soup kitchen. Gabe asks her lover, Marco, a federal police officer, to obtain surveillance on Kane, and is heartbroken to see him involved with a neo-Nazi group. Blake takes his crew for weapons training at Magoo's bush property, where he humiliates Kane for refusing to kill a pig, then threatens him about his affair with Zoe. Later in the night, Kane pushes Blake off a scarp, killing him. On their return to Melbourne, Kane and Stix visit former skinhead Vic, and tell him "It's done".
4	"The Dark Heart of Things"	James Napier Robertson	Omar Musa	1 January 2018
Antifasc confront Patriot Blue at Blake's funeral, but Kane and Vic are ready for them with reinforcements and weapons, putting Danny in a coma. Gabe unsuccessfully tries to talk Kane out of the white power movement. After a confrontation with two Sudanese youths, Kane and Vic head up to Magoo's to gather weapons, and Noddy is abducted and tortured. Laila joins Antifasc to trash Jago Zoric's house not realising he is home, and he dies after slipping and hitting his head. Kane arrives and sprays Islamic graffiti on the walls.
5	"Chaos"	Daina Reid	James Napier Robertson	1 January 2018
Petra and McKew try to clean up after the disastrous raid on Zoric's house. Independent MP George Anabasis considers supporting the immigration bill after condemning Zoric's death as an act of terrorism. As Antifasc tries to track Laila to silence her, she contacts Anabasis to get him to stop them. Vic and Magoo discuss a "job" which they are planning, to get money for Magoo's daughter. Gabe attempts to kill her father. Marco tries to recruit Kane as an informant. Cindi tells Vic that Antifasc will be meeting with Anabasis, and Vic makes plans to assassinate him. Gabe makes a final approach to Kane, telling him the shocking truth about his father.
6	"Anabasis"	Daina Reid	Geoffrey Wright	1 January 2018
Gabe leaves the country, while Vic and Magoo proceed with their plan to assassinate George Anabasis, making a suicide vest for the terminally ill Magoo to wear to the school reunion Anabasis is speaking at. Cindi, Petra and Tomas head to the boathouse, as do Leila and Farid, all of them hoping to speak to Anabasis. The Antifasc group is followed by police, but the officers are in an accident and call off the operation. Marco rushes to the boathouse, but is shot dead by Zoe. As Kane realises Cindi is at the boathouse and Vic's plan is going ahead, he races to the river but is too late and watches as the bomb explodes, killing almost everyone inside.
