= List of awards and nominations received by Russell Crowe =

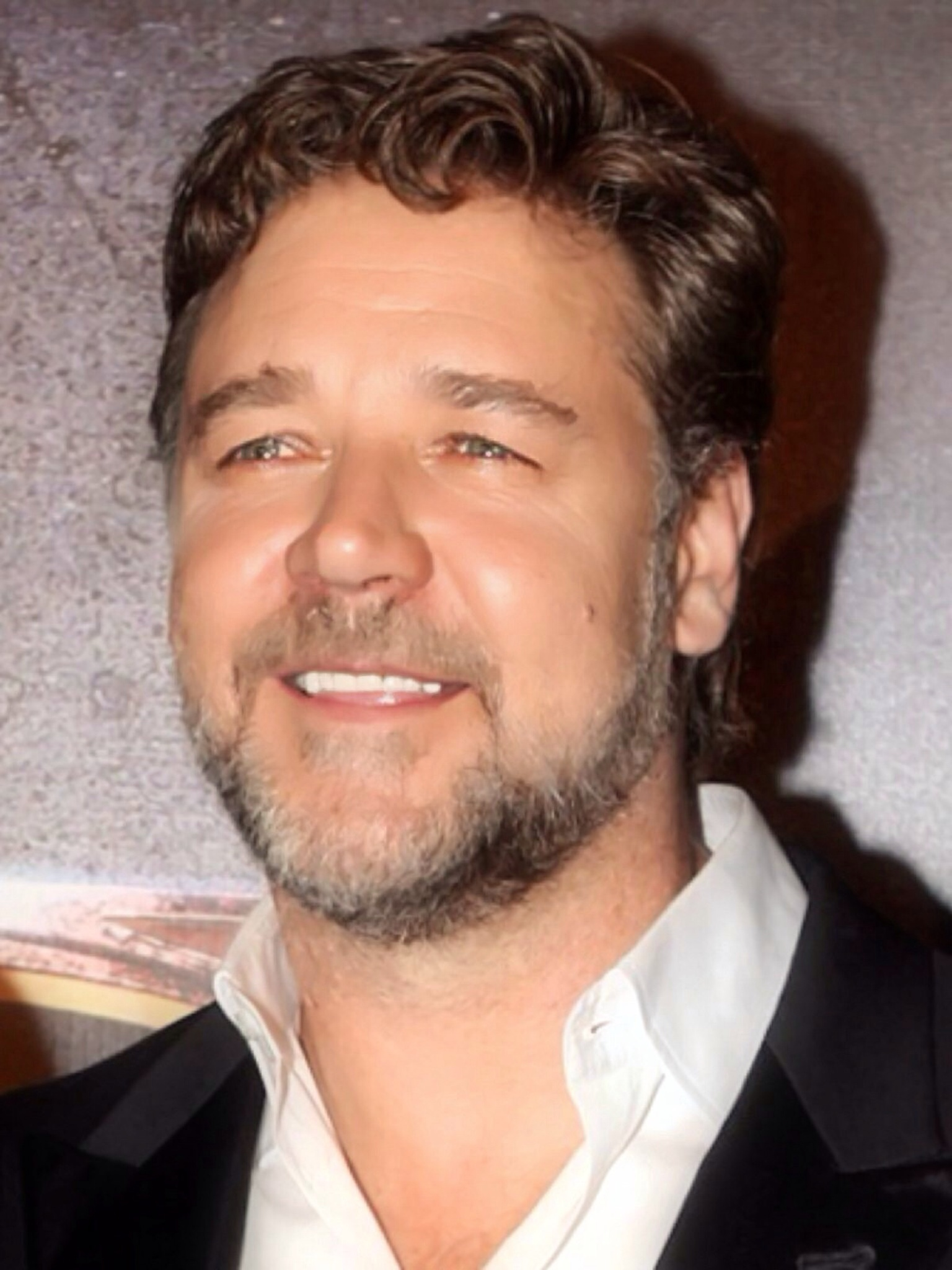
Crowe at the Sydney premiere of Man of Steel on June 14, 2013

New Zealand Australian actor Russell Crowe has acted in blockbuster films such as Gladiator (2000), a historical epic for which he won the Academy Award for Best Actor. He is also a winner of the BAFTA Award for Best Actor in a Leading Role and Golden Globe Award for Best Actor – Motion Picture Drama for his portrayal of John Forbes Nash Jr. in the biographical drama A Beautiful Mind (2001).

== Major associations ==
=== Academy Awards ===
| Year | Category | Nominated work | Result | Ref. |
|---|---|---|---|---|
| 2000 | Best Actor | The Insider | Nominated | |
| 2001 | Best Actor | Gladiator | Won | |
| 2002 | Best Actor | A Beautiful Mind | Nominated | |

=== AACTA Awards ===
| Year | Category | Nominated work | Result | Ref. |
|---|---|---|---|---|
| 1991 | Best Lead Actor – Cinema | The Crossing | Nominated | |
| 1992 | Best Supporting Actor – Cinema | Proof | Won | |
| 1993 | Best Lead Actor – Cinema | Romper Stomper | Won | |
| 2002 | Best Lead Actor – Cinema | A Beautiful Mind | Nominated | |
| 2005 | Best International Lead Actor – Cinema | Cinderella Man | Won | |
| 2007 | Best International Lead Actor – Cinema | American Gangster | Nominated | |
| 2009 | Best International Lead Actor – Cinema | State of Play | Won | |
| 2014 | Best Lead Actor – Cinema | The Water Diviner | Nominated | |
| 2019 | Best Supporting Actor – Cinema | Boy Erased | Nominated | |
| 2020 | Best Supporting Actor – Cinema | True History of the Kelly Gang | Nominated | |

=== BAFTA Awards ===
| Year | Category | Nominated work | Result | Ref. |
|---|---|---|---|---|
| 2000 | Best Actor in a Leading Role | The Insider | Nominated | |
| 2001 | Best Actor in a Leading Role | Gladiator | Nominated | |
| 2002 | Best Actor in a Leading Role | A Beautiful Mind | Won | |

=== Golden Globe Awards ===
| Year | Category | Nominated work | Result | Ref. |
|---|---|---|---|---|
| 2000 | Best Actor in a Motion Picture – Drama | The Insider | Nominated | |
| 2001 | Best Actor in a Motion Picture – Drama | Gladiator | Nominated | |
| 2002 | Best Actor in a Motion Picture – Drama | A Beautiful Mind | Won | |
| 2004 | Best Actor in a Motion Picture – Drama | Master and Commander: The Far Side of the World | Nominated | |
| 2006 | Best Actor in a Motion Picture – Drama | Cinderella Man | Nominated | |
| 2020 | Best Actor in a Miniseries or Motion Picture – Television | The Loudest Voice | Won | |

=== Screen Actors Guild Awards ===
| Year | Category | Nominated work | Result | Ref. |
|---|---|---|---|---|
| 1998 | Outstanding Cast in a Motion Picture | L.A. Confidential | Nominated | |
| 2000 | Outstanding Male Actor in a Leading Role | The Insider | Nominated | |
| 2001 | Outstanding Male Actor in a Leading Role | Gladiator | Nominated | |
| 2001 | Outstanding Cast in a Motion Picture | Gladiator | Nominated | |
| 2002 | Outstanding Cast in a Motion Picture | A Beautiful Mind | Nominated | |
| 2002 | Outstanding Male Actor in a Leading Role | A Beautiful Mind | Won | |
| 2006 | Outstanding Male Actor in a Leading Role | Cinderella Man | Nominated | |
| 2008 | Outstanding Cast in a Motion Picture | American Gangster | Nominated | |
| 2008 | Outstanding Cast in a Motion Picture | 3:10 to Yuma | Nominated | |
| 2013 | Outstanding Cast in a Motion Picture | Les Misérables | Nominated | |
| 2020 | Outstanding Male Actor in a Miniseries or Television Movie | The Loudest Voice | Nominated | |

== Miscellaneous awards ==
=== MTV Movie & TV Awards ===
| Year | Nominated work | Category | Result |
|---|---|---|---|
| 2001 | Gladiator | Best Performance in a Movie | Nominated |
| 2001 | Gladiator | Best Fight in a Movie | Nominated |
| 2002 | A Beautiful Mind | Best Performance in a Movie | Nominated |

=== Satellite Awards ===
| Year | Nominated work | Category | Result |
|---|---|---|---|
| 1997 | L.A. Confidential | Best Actor in a Film | Nominated |
| 1999 | The Insider | Best Actor in a Film | Nominated |
| 2000 | Gladiator | Best Actor in a Film | Nominated |
| 2001 | A Beautiful Mind | Best Actor in a Film | Nominated |
| 2012 | Les Misérables | Best Cast in a Film | Won |
| 2018 | Boy Erased | Best Supporting Actor in a Film | Nominated |
| 2019 | The Loudest Voice | Best Actor in a Miniseries or Television Film | Nominated |

=== Saturn Awards ===
| Year | Nominated work | Category | Result |
|---|---|---|---|
| 2001 | Gladiator | Best Film Lead Actor | Nominated |

=== Critics' awards ===
| Year | Nominated work | Award | Category | Result |
|---|---|---|---|---|
| 1992 | Romper Stomper | Seattle International Film Festival | Best Actor | Won |
| 1993 | Hammers Over the Anvil | Seattle International Film Festival | Best Actor | Won |
| 1999 | The Insider | Broadcast Film Critics Association | Best Actor | Won |
| 1999 | The Insider | Los Angeles Film Critics Association | Best Actor | Won |
| 1999 | The Insider | National Board of Review | Best Actor | Won |
| 1999 | The Insider | National Society of Film Critics | Best Actor | Won |
| 1999 | The Insider | San Diego Film Critics Society | Best Actor | Won |
| 1999 | The Insider | Southeastern Film Critics Association | Best Actor | Won |
| 1999 | The Insider | London Film Critics Circle | Best Actor | Nominated |
| 1999 | The Insider | New York Film Critics Circle | Best Actor | Nominated |
| 1999 | The Insider | Chicago Film Critics Association | Best Actor | Nominated |
| 1999 | The Insider | Las Vegas Film Critics Society | Best Actor | Nominated |
| 1999 | The Insider | Online Film Critics Society | Best Actor | Nominated |
| 2000 | Gladiator | Broadcast Film Critics Association | Best Actor | Won |
| 2000 | Gladiator | Dallas-Fort Worth Film Critics Association | Best Actor | Won |
| 2000 | Gladiator | London Film Critics Circle | Best Actor | Won |
| 2000 | Gladiator | San Diego Film Critics Society | Best Actor | Won |
| 2000 | Gladiator | Las Vegas Film Critics Society | Best Actor | Nominated |
| 2000 | Gladiator | Online Film Critics Society | Best Actor | Nominated |
| 2001 | A Beautiful Mind | Broadcast Film Critics Association | Best Actor | Won |
| 2001 | A Beautiful Mind | Dallas-Fort Worth Film Critics Association | Best Actor | Won |
| 2001 | A Beautiful Mind | San Diego Film Critics Society | Best Actor | Won |
| 2001 | A Beautiful Mind | Phoenix Film Critics Society | Best Actor | Won |
| 2001 | A Beautiful Mind | Golden Schmoes Awards | Best Actor | Nominated |
| 2001 | A Beautiful Mind | Chicago Film Critics Association | Best Actor | Nominated |
| 2001 | A Beautiful Mind | Online Film Critics Society | Best Actor | Nominated |
| 2001 | A Beautiful Mind | Vancouver Film Critics Circle | Best Actor | Nominated |
| 2003 | Master and Commander: The Far Side of the World | Broadcast Film Critics Association | Best Actor | Nominated |
| 2003 | Master and Commander: The Far Side of the World | London Film Critics Circle | Best Actor | Nominated |
| 2005 | Cinderella Man | Broadcast Film Critics Association | Best Actor | Nominated |
| 2005 | Cinderella Man | Dallas-Fort Worth Film Critics Association | Best Actor | Nominated |
| 2012 | Les Misérables | Washington D.C. Area Film Critics Association | Best Ensemble | Won |
| 2012 | Les Misérables | Broadcast Film Critics Association | Best Acting Ensemble | Nominated |
| 2012 | Les Misérables | Phoenix Film Critics Society | Best Cast | Nominated |
| 2012 | Les Misérables | San Diego Film Critics Society | Best Performance by an Ensemble | Nominated |
| 2019 | The Loudest Voice | Critics' Choice Television Award | Best Actor in a Movie/Miniseries | Nominated |

=== Miscellaneous awards ===
| Year | Nominated work | Award | Category | Result |
|---|---|---|---|---|
| 2000 | The Insider | National Board of Review | Best Actor | Won |
| 2001 | Gladiator | Empire Awards | Best Actor | Won |
| 2011 | Robin Hood | Teen Choice Awards | Choice Actor: Action | Nominated |
| 2013 | Les Misérables | National Board of Review | Best Cast | Won |
| 2017 | The Mummy | Golden Raspberry Awards | Worst Supporting Actor | Nominated |
| 2023 | The Pope's Exorcist | Golden Raspberry Awards | Worst Actor | Nominated |
