= Gillian Jones =

Australian actress

- Born: 19 April 1947 (age 79); Newcastle, New South Wales, Australia
- Occupation: Actress
- Years active: 1968–present

Gillian Jones (born 19 April 1947) is an Australian actress from Newcastle, New South Wales who is best known for appearances in Twelfth Night, Oscar and Lucinda, Last Train to Freo and the role of Di Paige in the television series Love My Way. She had a recurring role on the Australian drama Packed to the Rafters since 2009.

== Filmography ==
=== Film ===
- 1982: Fighting Back as English teacher
- 1982.5: Heatwave as Barbie Lee Taylor
- 1986.62: I Own the Racecourse (TV film) as Mrs. Hoddel
- 1987: Twelfth Night as Viola
- 1988: Alterations (TV film) as Rachel
- 1988: Shame as Tina Farrel
- 1989: Echoes of Paradise as Mitty
- 1989: Lover Boy as Sally
- 1990: Come In Spinner (TV film) as Mrs. Malone
- 1991: Breathing Under Water
- 1994: Cody: A Family Affair (TV film)
- 1996: What I Have Written as Frances Bourin / Catherine
- 1997: Oscar and Lucinda as Elizabeth Leplastrier
- 1998: Pentuphouse (short) as Della
- 1998: Terra Nova as Emily
- 2003.7: So Close to Home as Ramona
- 2006: Last Train to Freo as Maureen
- 2007: Lucky Miles as Chris
- 2007: Katoomba (short) as Kym
- 2010: The Tree as Vonnie
- 2014: The Rover as Grandma
- 2015: Mad Max: Fury Road as a Vuvalini
- 2016: Goldstone as Sally
- 2016: War Machine as Tashi Tsomo (uncredited)
- 2017: Bleeding Steel as a witch
- 2019: Judy and Punch as Dr. Goodtime
- 2019: Acute Misfortune as Ruth Marr

=== Television ===
- 1968: Skippy the Bush Kangaroo as Jane (1 episode)
- 1968: Contrabandits as Marcia Haslek (1 episode)
- 1972: Homicide as Julie Beaumont (1 episode)
- 1973: Division 4 as Wendy (1 episode)
- 1974: Silent Number (1 episode)
- 1975: Shannon's Mob Carol (1 episode)
- 1977: Beyond Reasonable Doubt as Pamela McLeod-Lindsay (1 episode)
- 1990: The Flying Doctors as Peta Rowlands (1 episode)
- 1992: Police Rescue as Psychiatrist (1 episode)
- 1996: G.P. as Jessica Smith (1 episode)
- 1997: Wildside as Anna Carmody (1 episode)
- 2004-07: Love My Way as Di Paige (27 episodes)
- 2009-10: Packed to the Rafters as Rachel 'Chel' Warne (25 episodes)
- 2010: Spirited as Fran Jansen (1 episode)
- 2011: The Slap as Rachel
- 2012: Miss Fisher's Murder Mysteries as Elsie (episode "1.11")
- 2012: Redfern Now as Ms. McCann, the principal of Clifton College (episode "1.4")
