= Macbeth (2006 film) =

2006 film by Geoffrey Wright

- Australian film poster
- Directed by: Geoffrey Wright
- Written by: Victoria Hill; Geoffrey Wright
- Based on: Macbeth by William Shakespeare
- Produced by: Martin Fabinyi
- Starring: Sam Worthington; Victoria Hill; Lachy Hulme; Gary Sweet; Steve Bastoni; Mick Molloy; Terry Lim
- Cinematography: Will Gibson
- Edited by: Jane Usher
- Music by: John Clifford White
- Production company: Mushroom Pictures
- Distributed by: Palace Films and Cinemas
- Release date: 21 September 2006
- Running time: 109 minutes
- Country: Australia
- Language: English
- Box office: $232,900

Macbeth is a 2006 Australian adaptation of the play by William Shakespeare of the same name. It was directed by Geoffrey Wright and features an ensemble cast led by Sam Worthington in the title role. Macbeth, filmed in Melbourne and Victoria, was released in Australia on 21 September 2006.

Wright and Hill wrote the script, which—although it uses a modern-day Melbourne gangster setting—largely maintains the language of the original play.

Macbeth was selected to screen at the Toronto International Film Festival in September 2006.

== Plot ==
In a cemetery, the Weird Sisters, three school girl witches, are destroying and defacing headstones and statues, while close by Lady Macbeth weeps beside a headstone marked "beloved son" and Macbeth stands by. The three witches plan to meet with Macbeth later, and leave the cemetery.

Macbeth leads Duncan and his gang to a drug deal with Macdonwald and his men. In a gunfight between the gangs, all of Macdonwald's gang are killed. While chasing two gunmen, Banquo and Macbeth are led to the Cawdor Club. They seize the club and kill the owner.

Duncan hands the club over to Macbeth, and Macbeth and Banquo celebrate by drinking the club's alcohol and taking pills found on a table. During this drug trip Macbeth meets the three witches, who prophesy that he will soon be in Duncan's position with control over the gang. He tells his wife this, though she doubts he has it in him to take over Duncan's position. Later when she learns that Duncan will be dining and staying at their house, she plots with her husband to kill him.

Lady Macbeth drugs Duncan's bodyguards, and while they sleep Macbeth takes their knives and kills Duncan, framing the guards. Macduff comes to Inverness and finds Duncan murdered in his bed. Before the bodyguards can profess their innocence Macbeth shoots them. Malcolm, Duncan's son, immediately suspects Macbeth as having something to do with his father's death and flees.

After Macbeth is hailed as the new leader by most of Duncan's gang Macbeth sends two murderers to kill Banquo and his son, Fleance. The murderers kill Banquo, but Fleance escapes. Macbeth holds a celebratory dinner, and after learning that Banquo has been killed, sees a vision of Banquo's ghost at the dining table. Macbeth is becoming shaken by his desire for power. Lennox, Ross and others suspect Macbeth of killing Duncan and Banquo.

Macbeth finds the three witches in his house that evening and, after drinking a foul potion and engaging in an orgiastic sexual encounter with them, asks the witches of his future. He is told to fear Macduff, but no man "of woman born shall kill you". Later it is revealed that Macduff is not a natural birth, but a caesarean section, which is not "of woman born". He is also shown a vision of Fleance being hailed as gang leader. These prophecies enrage Macbeth, as does the witches' quick disappearance, and he has the murderers go to Macduff's home and brutally kill Lady Macduff and her son.

Lennox and Ross go to tell Macduff who has gone to his uncle Siward. Malcolm convinces him that Macbeth has gone much too far in his quest for power and must be stripped of his leader status.

Lady Macbeth has become more insane, re-imagining the evening of Duncan's killing and tries to wash off his blood from her hands. A doctor sedates her, and Macbeth appears indifferent to her instability. He prepares for the impending attack from Macduff, Lennox and Ross. Lady Macbeth commits suicide in a bath tub by slashing her wrists, enraging Macbeth. The two murderers, realising the unlikeliness of surviving the attack, swiftly flee Dunsinane leaving Macbeth with only Seyton, his main bodyguard, and two others. The murderers run into Macduff and his associates at the edge of Burnham Wood and are shot.

Malcolm leads his men to Dunsinane where they ambush the house and a gunfight ensues. Macbeth is chased to the cellar where he faces off with Macduff and is stabbed in the stomach. He stumbles upstairs to his bedroom, where the body of Lady Macbeth lies, and dies at her side. As Macduff leads Fleance, now the inherited gang leader, from the house Macbeth's "tomorrow and tomorrow and tomorrow" speech is heard.

== Cast ==
- Sam Worthington as Macbeth
- Victoria Hill as Lady Macbeth
- Lachy Hulme as Macduff
- Gary Sweet as Duncan
- Steve Bastoni as Banquo
- Mick Molloy as Murderer in Brown
- Matt Doran as Malcolm
- Bob Franklin as Siward
- Craig Stott as Fleance
- Terry Lim as the Chinese business man
- Jonny Pasvolsky as Lennox

== Reception ==
On the review aggregator website Rotten Tomatoes, 49% of 43 critics' reviews are positive, with an average rating of 5.2/10. The website's consensus reads: "A new take on Macbeth relies too heavily on nudity and violence, and ends up looking like a campy 1970s horror movie." Metacritic, which uses a weighted average, assigned the film a score of 51 out of 100, based on 15 critics, indicating "mixed or average" reviews.

== Awards ==
- 2006 Australian Film Institute Awards: Best Production Design (David McKay), Best Costume Design (Jane Johnston)

Nominations:

- 2006 Australian Film Institute Awards: Best Cinematography (Will Gibson), Best Original Music Score (John Clifford White), Best Sound (Frank Lipson and John Wilkinson)

== Box office ==
Macbeth grossed $232,994 at the box office in Australia.

== See also ==
- Macbeth
- William Shakespeare
- Melbourne gangland killings
- Scotland, PA, another modern take on the play
