= Romper Stomper =

1992 film by Geoffrey Wright

- US poster
- Directed by: Geoffrey Wright
- Written by: Geoffrey Wright
- Produced by: Ian Pringle; Daniel Scharf
- Starring: Russell Crowe; Daniel Pollock; Jacqueline McKenzie; Alex Scott; Tony Le-Nguyen; Colin Chin
- Cinematography: Ron Hagen
- Edited by: Bill Murphy
- Music by: John Clifford White
- Production company: Film Victoria
- Distributed by: Roadshow Film Distributors
- Release date: 12 November 1992
- Running time: 94 minutes
- Country: Australia
- Language: English
- Budget: A$1.6 million
- Box office: $3.3 million

Romper Stomper is a 1992 Australian drama film written and directed by Geoffrey Wright in his feature film directorial debut. The film stars Russell Crowe, Daniel Pollock, Jacqueline McKenzie, Tony Le-Nguyen and Colin Chin. The film tells the story of the exploits and downfall of a neo-Nazi group in blue-collar suburban Melbourne. The film was released on 12 November 1992.

== Plot ==
A gang of violent young neo-Nazi skinheads from Footscray, Victoria, Australia, attack three Vietnamese Australian teenagers in a tunnel at Footscray Station, brutally beating two of them. The gang is led by Hando, a violent, reckless, and unpredictable psychopath with strong white nationalist beliefs and homicidal tendencies, with his friend and second-in-command, the quiet, reserved, but similarly violent Davey. At their local pub, Hando and Davey meet Gabrielle, who suffers from poorly controlled epilepsy, the day after her sexually abusive, affluent father, Martin, has her drug-addicted boyfriend arrested. Gabrielle begins a romantic relationship with Hando, which, despite a strong start, quickly becomes dysfunctional as he becomes increasingly abusive towards her.

After the gang vandalises a shopping mall, friends of the gang visit from Canberra, one of whom has joined the Royal Australian Navy. A party at the warehouse follows. The next day, two boys go to the pub, which has just been sold to a Vietnamese businessman, and inform Hando. He arrives with his gang, and savagely beat two of the new owner's sons, while the third son escapes and calls for help. Fed up with the gang's antagonism and violence, a large mob of armed and angry Vietnamese men, led by Tiger, arrives and descends upon the skinheads. The Vietnamese outnumber the skinheads by droves, and in the ensuing brawl and chase, several skinheads are beaten by the angry mob, among them Magoo, Luke, Champ, and Brett. The rest of the gang are chased back to their rented warehouse, from which they narrowly escape as the Vietnamese mob breaks in and ransacks the building before burning it down.

The skinheads soon find a new base at a nearby warehouse, after evicting a pair of squatters, and plan retaliation against the Vietnamese. When the gang agrees to acquire firearms, two female friends of the gang depart in disgust. Gabrielle suggests the gang burgle her father's mansion for the guns. After beating and tying up Martin, the gang ransacks the house, smashes one of his cars, and raids his wine collection. The youngest skinhead, Bubs, steals a deactivated revolver from the house during the burglary. Gabrielle tells Martin the burglary is revenge for his years of abuse, then reveals to Davey her plan to take Hando away from his violent life. Martin eventually frees himself and uses a handgun to scare away the gang, who flee in the trashed vehicle and leave behind most of the stolen goods. Due to this incident, Davey begins to question his violent lifestyle.

Agitated by Gabrielle's criticism of the poor outcome of the robbery and their living conditions, Hando abruptly hits, berates, dumps, and then evicts her. Davey, unable to tolerate the excess violence and Hando's cruel and unpredictable nature any further, declares his departure from the gang and gives Gabrielle his German grandmother's address, where he will be staying. Gabrielle informs the police of the gang's location and spends the night with Davey, where they confess their feelings for each other. Davey also reveals his doubts about his violent lifestyle to Gabrielle, having removed the racist patches from his flight jacket out of concern for his grandmother.

The morning after, the police raid the warehouse where the skinhead gang is hiding. Bubs is shot in the head after pointing the stolen deactivated gun at the police, and what remains of the gang is beaten and arrested. Hando, who was returning to the warehouse and fled when he spotted the police, successfully evades capture as the last remaining member of his gang.

Arriving at Davey's granny flat, Hando finds his friend in bed with Gabrielle. Hando accuses her of informing the police, but Davey says they were together the whole time since leaving the squat. However, Hando convinces Davey and Gabrielle to come with him by claiming the police will soon raid the residence, and the trio goes on the run. They rob a service station, where Hando strangles the Asian attendant to death; and, after driving all night, they stop at Point Addis, Bells Beach, the next morning. There, Gabrielle overhears a conversation wherein Hando tries to convince Davey to abandon her. Feeling betrayed, Gabrielle sets their car on fire and admits to tipping the police off about the gang's whereabouts. A bus of Japanese tourists arrive and the passengers taking pictures and video, while the tour guide and the driver stop the fire. Hando, infuriated beyond sense, attacks Gabrielle and attempts to asphyxiate her, first by strangling her and then by drowning her in the surf. Davey attempts to fight Hando several times and successfully disrupts each attempt on Gabrielle's life, but he is quickly fought off and beaten down each time. Eventually, Hando attempts to smother Gabrielle in the sand, before Davey, desperate to save Gabrielle, stabs Hando in the neck with his Hitler Youth knife. Hando staggers away before finally collapsing. As the Japanese tourists look on, a weeping Davey attempts to comfort a petrified Gabrielle as Hando's corpse gazes lifelessly out at the ocean.

== Cast ==
- Russell Crowe as Hando
- Daniel Pollock as Davey
- Jacqueline McKenzie as Gabrielle
- Tony Le-Nguyen (credited as Tony Lee) as Tiger
- Alex Scott as Martin
- Leigh Russell as Sonny Jim
- Dan Wyllie as Cackles
- James McKenna as Bubs
- Eric Mueck as Champ
- Frank Magree as Brent
- Christopher McLean as Luke
- John Brumpton as Magoo
- Colin Chin as Japanese Extra 1

== Origin ==
Geoffrey Wright's script was inspired by the highly publicised crimes of leading Melbourne Neo-Nazi Dane Sweetman. Wright contacted Sweetman via mail in 1991 to request an interview; Sweetman was at that time in the process of serving a life sentence in Pentridge Prison for murder. The interview could not be arranged in a timely manner due to prison regulations, so the two men commenced correspondence, and Sweetman furnished Wright with a transcript of his murder trial, from which Wright drew influence. This influence is most clearly seen in the line delivered by Hando when scaring off squatters from the warehouse: "I'll chop your legs off". It is a direct reference to Sweetman's having cut off the legs of his victim.

That was one of many aspects of the film that mirrored Sweetman's life. A further example is that the characters Gabrielle, Davey, and the punk girls were all based on associates of Sweetman. Sweetman's name was conspicuously absent in the end credits, however. This issue was raised in the Australian media during the publicity phase of promoting the film. Russell Crowe acknowledged the origin of his character during an interview on Tonight Live with Steve Vizard in 1992. Wright has also cited Sweetman as an inspiration for the film's characters.

The film was financed by the Australian Film Commission with Film Victoria.

== Soundtrack ==
Romper Stomper

Soundtrack album by John Clifford White and the Romper Stomper Orchestra & Band
- Released: 30 November 1992
- Recorded: 1991–1992
- Studio: Metropolis Studios
- Genres: Film score, alternative rock
- Length: 34:33
- Label: Picture This

The film's score was released by Picture This Records. It included the orchestral score and four tracks of energetic punk rock music similar to the Oi! genre (recorded by studio musicians).

In 2014, bassist Chris Pettifer was interviewed for Vice magazine about the soundtrack, in which he expressed his disappointment about how genuine neo-Nazi groups had embraced the Oi! songs.

1. "Prologue"
2. "Romper Stomper Theme"
3. "Pulling on the Boots"
4. "Skinheads Go Shopping"/"Gabe Sees Swastika"
5. "Mein Kampf"
6. "Fuhrer Fuhrer"
7. "Let's Break Some Fingers/Brawl Crawl"
8. "The Smack Song"
9. "Tonguey for the Skins/Nightmare for the Hippies"
10. "At the Mansion"
11. "We Came to Wreck Everything"
12. "Wild Animals 1"
13. "Bubs Dead/Gabe Finds Davey"
14. "Gabe and Davey"
15. "Fourth Reich Fighting Men"
16. "Night Drive"
17. "On the Beach"
18. "Wild Animals 2"
19. "Fourth Reich Fighting Men (Reprise)"
20. "The Dead Nazi March"

=== Crew ===
- John Clifford White – vocals
- John Hewett – guitar
- Chris Pettifer – bass
- Phillip Beard – drums
- Peter Pales – German vocals on "Pulling on the Boots"
- John Hawker – conductor
- Produced by Doug Brady
- All songs composed and written by John Clifford White

== Awards ==
The film was nominated for nine Australian Film Institute Awards. It won Best Achievement in Sound, Best Actor in a Lead Role, and Best Original Music Score.

At the APRA Music Awards of 1993, the soundtrack won Television or Film Score of the Year.

== Box office and reception ==
Romper Stomper opened at number one at the Australian box office with a gross of $819,736 from 49 screens, replacing Strictly Ballroom. It went on to gross $3.2 million at the Australian box office, the second highest-grossing Australian film of the year behind Strictly Ballroom. The film has an approval rating of 79% on Rotten Tomatoes based on 29 reviews, with a weighted average of 6.4/10 with its consensus reading: "Relentlessly grim and gripping, Romper Stomper is a disquietingly authentic glimpse into the inner dynamics of a hate group, featuring an electric performance by Russell Crowe". Metacritic, which uses a weighted average, assigned the film a score of 61 out of 100, based on 21 critics, indicating "generally favorable" reviews.

David Stratton of SBS' The Movie Show felt that the film was socially irresponsible, stating that he felt it made neo-Nazism look fun and exciting at a time of heightened racial tensions. He therefore refused to give it a rating at all, while fellow Movie Show critic Margaret Pomeranz gave it four-and-a-half stars. Stratton also described the film in Variety as "A Clockwork Orange without the intellect". Wright was so upset by Stratton's rating that he later poured a glass of wine on Stratton during a chance meeting at the 1994 Venice Film Festival. Stratton would later clarify his position:

I think Romper Stomper was a very well-made film and an extremely well-acted film, and I thought Geoffrey Wright had a lot of talent. What troubled me about Romper Stomper was that it was made in a time, I think 1992, when there had been some racial problems with young Vietnamese people, particularly in Melbourne, and I thought the film could stir up more violence. Looking back, it was probably pretty foolish of me to think that I could get that message across [by refusing to rate the film]. So Geoffrey [Wright] was upset, but I must say I did get letters at the time, from people in the Vietnamese community, who thanked me for taking that attitude because they felt that the film could stir up racial violence.

During 1993, photographs from the film by its stills photographer, Peter Leiss, were shown at Melbourne's Performing Arts Museum.

== Influence ==
The film's violent content sparked heavy controversy. In March 2000, British prisoner Robert Stewart bludgeoned his cellmate, Zahid Mubarek, to death with a wooden table leg at the Feltham Young Offenders' Institution. In 2004, Stewart was found guilty of the racially motivated murder of Mubarek and was jailed for life. Stewart compared himself to Hando in Romper Stomper as well as Alex DeLarge in A Clockwork Orange. An inquiry heard that Stewart had watched Romper Stomper two days before the killing. A member of the inquiry team said he was a prolific letter writer, and much of his correspondence contained racist and violent content: "He sees himself in the correspondence starring in the film Romper Stomper as a racist thug attacking gooks", the inquiry was told. The Anti-Nazi League protested against the film's London premiere.

Dylann Roof, the perpetrator of the Charleston church shooting, had an image of Hando dying on the homepage of his personal website.

== Television series ==
An Australian video streaming service Stan produced Romper Stomper, a six-part television series, as a sequel to the film. The film's director, Geoffrey Wright, directed two episodes, alongside fellow directors Daina Reid and James Napier Robertson. The actors reprising their original roles are Jacqueline McKenzie, Dan Wyllie and John Brumpton.

== See also ==
- Cinema of Australia
- List of films shot in Melbourne
- List of films featuring home invasions
- List of skinhead films
- Russell Crowe filmography
- American History X, a 1998 drama film directed by Tony Kaye, starring Edward Norton and Edward Furlong and set in Los Angeles, California that has a similar premise and themes to Romper Stomper.
