= Russell Crowe =

New Zealand–born actor (born 1964)

- Crowe in 2026
- Born: Russell Ira Crowe; 7 April 1964 (age 62); Wellington, New Zealand
- Occupations: Actor; film director
- Years active: 1972–present
- Works: Full list
- Spouse: Danielle Spencer (m. 2003; div. 2018)
- Children: 2
- Relatives: Dave Crowe (uncle); Jeff Crowe (cousin); Martin Crowe (cousin)
- Awards: Full list

Russell Ira Crowe (born 7 April 1964) is a New Zealand–born actor and film director. His work on screen has earned him various accolades, including an Academy Award, a BAFTA Award and two Golden Globes.

Crowe moved to Australia at the age of four and began residing there permanently by the age of 21. He began acting in Australia and had his breakthrough role in Romper Stomper (1992), for which he won the AACTA Award for Best Actor in a Leading Role. He gained international recognition in the late 1990s for his starring roles in L.A. Confidential (1997) and The Insider (1999), the latter of which earned him his first Academy Award nomination. Crowe gained wider stardom for playing the title role of Gladiator (2000), which won him the Academy Award for Best Actor, and for portraying mathematician John Forbes Nash Jr. in A Beautiful Mind (2001), which saw him nominated for another Academy Award.

Crowe's other roles include Master and Commander: The Far Side of the World (2003), Cinderella Man (2005), 3:10 to Yuma (2007), American Gangster (2007), Robin Hood (2010), Les Misérables (2012), Man of Steel (2013), Noah (2014), The Nice Guys (2016), Thor: Love and Thunder (2022), The Pope's Exorcist (2023) and Nuremberg (2025). In 2014, he made his directorial debut with the drama The Water Diviner, in which he also starred.

Outside of acting, Crowe has been the co-owner of National Rugby League (NRL) team South Sydney Rabbitohs since 2006.

== Early life and education ==
Russell Ira Crowe was born in Strathmore Park, a suburb of Wellington, New Zealand, on 7 April 1964, the son of film set caterers Jocelyn Yvonne (née Wemyss) and John Alexander Crowe. John also managed a hotel. Jocelyn's father, Stan Wemyss, was a cinematographer who was awarded an MBE for filming footage of World War II as a member of the New Zealand Film Unit. One of Crowe's maternal great-great-grandmothers was Māori. John's father, John Doubleday Crowe, was a Welshman from Wrexham, while another of Crowe's grandparents was Scottish. Crowe's other ancestry includes English, German, Irish, Italian, Norwegian, and Swedish. He is a cousin of former New Zealand national cricket captains Martin and Jeff Crowe and the nephew of cricketer Dave Crowe.

At the age of four, Crowe moved to Australia with his family, settling in Sydney, where John and Jocelyn pursued their career in film set catering. Jocelyn's godfather was the producer of the Australian television series Spyforce, and Crowe was hired for a line of dialogue in one episode of the series at the age of five or six, opposite series star Jack Thompson. In 1994, Thompson would play the supportive father of Crowe's gay character in the film The Sum of Us. Crowe also appeared briefly in the series The Young Doctors.

In Australia, he was educated at Vaucluse Public School and Sydney Boys High School before moving back to New Zealand with his family in 1978. He continued his secondary education in Auckland, attending Auckland Grammar School and Mount Roskill Grammar School before leaving school to pursue his ambitions as a performer.

== Acting career ==
=== New Zealand ===
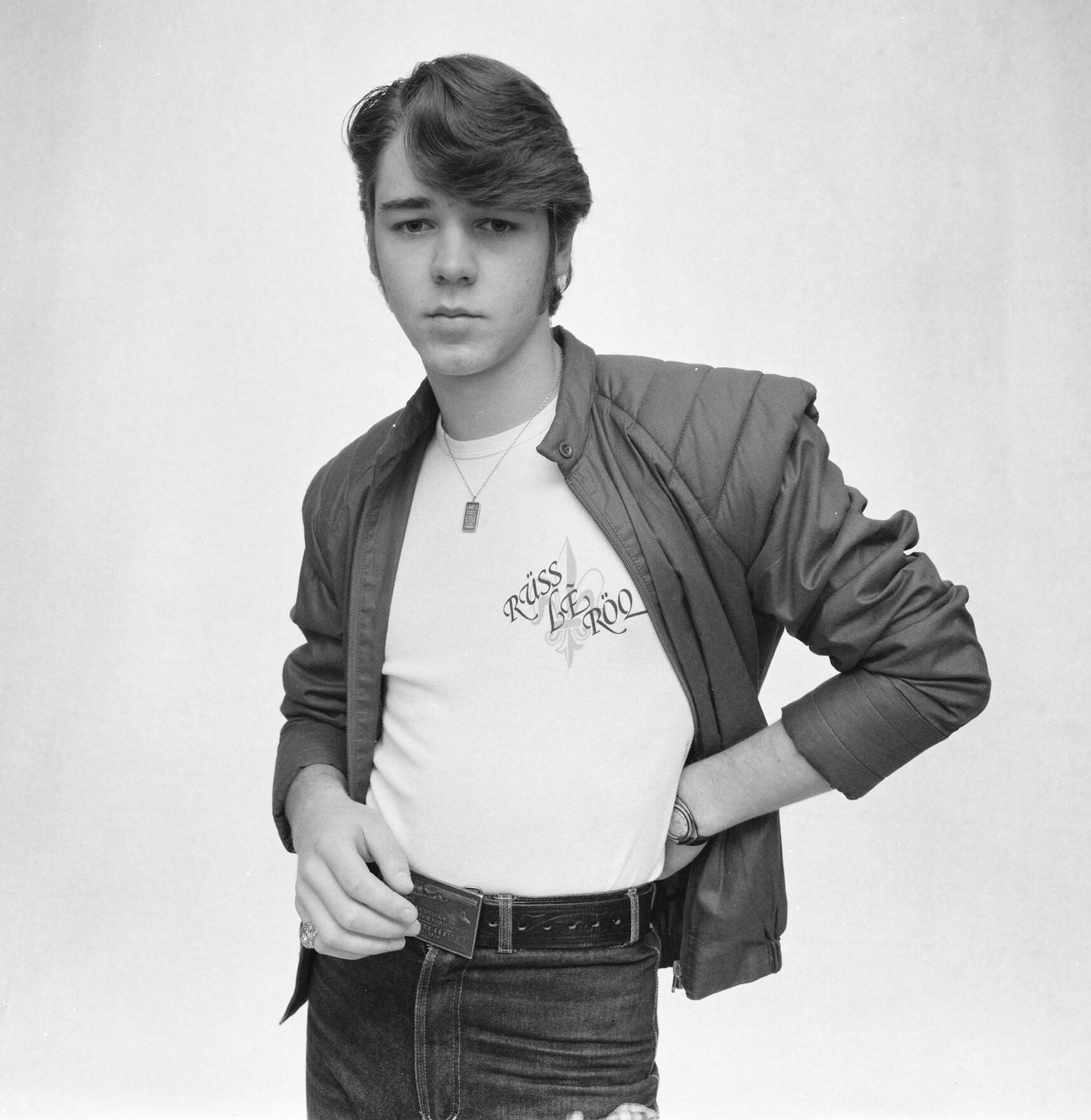
A promotional photo of Crowe as Russ Le Roq in 1981

Under guidance from his good friend Tom Sharplin, Crowe began his performing career as a musician in the early 1980s performing under the stage name "Russ Le Roq". He released several New Zealand singles, including "I Just Wanna Be Like Marlon Brando", "Pier 13", and "Shattered Glass", none of which charted. He managed an Auckland music venue called "The Venue" in 1984. When he was 18, he was featured in A Very Special Person..., a promotional video for the theology/ministry course at Avondale University, a Seventh-day Adventist tertiary education provider in New South Wales, Australia.

=== Australia ===
In 1985, Crowe left New Zealand and returned to Australia. He intended to apply to the National Institute of Dramatic Art. He said, "I was working in a theatre show, and talked to a guy who was then the head of technical support at NIDA. I asked him what he thought about me spending three years at NIDA. He told me it'd be a waste of time. He said, 'You already do the things you go there to learn, and you've been doing it for most of your life, so there's nothing to teach you but bad habits.'" From 1986 to 1988, he was given his first professional role by director Daniel Abineri, in a New Zealand production of The Rocky Horror Show. He played the role of Eddie/Dr Scott. He repeated this performance in a further Australian production of the show, which also toured New Zealand. In 1987, Crowe spent six months busking when he could not find other work. In the 1988 Australian production of Blood Brothers, Crowe played the role of Mickey. He was also cast again by Daniel Abineri in the role of Johnny, in the stage musical Bad Boy Johnny and the Prophets of Doom in 1989.

After appearing in the TV series Neighbours and Living with the Law, Crowe was cast by Faith Martin in his first film, The Crossing (1990), a small-town love triangle directed by George Ogilvie. Before production started, a film-student protégé of Ogilvie, Steve Wallace, hired Crowe for the 1990 film Blood Oath (aka Prisoners of the Sun), which was released a month earlier than The Crossing, although actually filmed later. In 1992, Crowe starred in the first episode of the second series of Police Rescue. Also in 1992, Crowe starred in Romper Stomper, an Australian film which followed the exploits and downfall of a racist skinhead group in blue-collar suburban Melbourne, directed by Geoffrey Wright and co-starring Jacqueline McKenzie. For the role, Crowe won an Australian Film Institute (AFI) award for Best Actor, following up from his Best Supporting Actor award for Proof in 1991.

=== North America ===
==== 1993–1999: Breakthrough ====
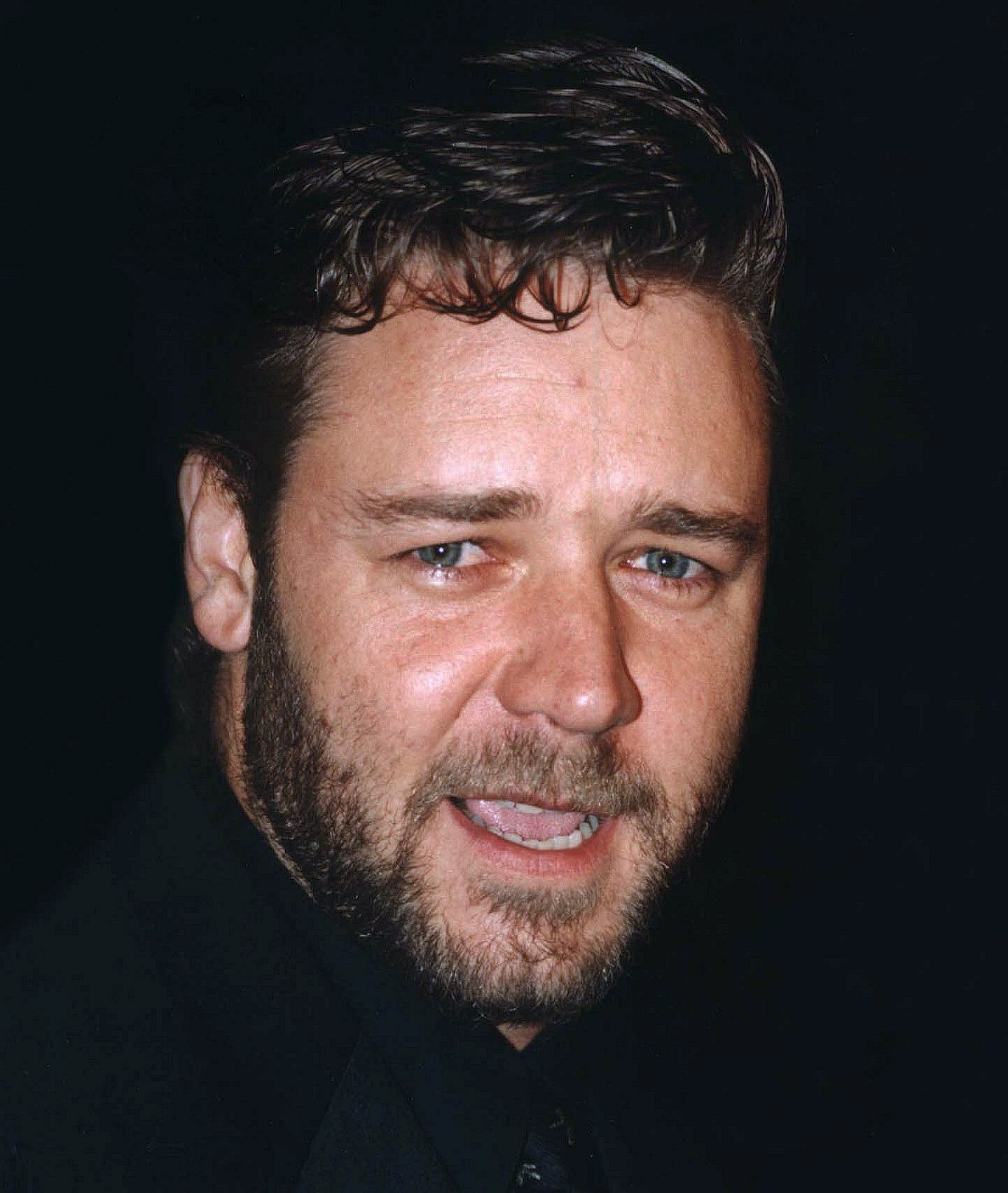
Crowe at the premiere of The Insider in Washington, D.C., 1999

After initial success in Australia, Crowe first starred in a Canadian production in 1993, For the Moment, before concentrating on American films. In 1993, he was favoured for the role of Joshua Chamberlain in the epic film Gettysburg but was passed over for Jeff Daniels. In 1995, he appeared in four Hollywood films. This included the science fiction film Virtuosity where he co-starred with Denzel Washington; it received poor reviews and failed commercially. His other roles that year saw him work with Sharon Stone in the western The Quick and the Dead, the comedy Rough Magic with Bridget Fonda, and his first starring role in the industry as an FBI agent in No Way Back.

He had his breakthrough playing a short-tempered LAPD officer having an affair with a call girl working in the stable of a shady millionaire who uses prostitutes to blackmail powerful politicians and businessmen in 1997's neo-noir hit L.A. Confidential. His co-stars included Kevin Spacey, Guy Pearce, and Kim Basinger, among others. He starred in Breaking Up, a romantic drama with Salma Hayek. After headlining the ice hockey-centred Mystery, Alaska, he portrayed Jeffrey Wigand in Michael Mann's The Insider (1999), based on Wigand's life. This film opened to highly positive reviews and earned Crowe his first nomination for an Academy Award. Crowe was offered the role as Wolverine for the first X-Men film, but he declined and recommended Hugh Jackman for the part, which launched the latter's film career.

==== 2000–2005: Stardom ====
In 2000, Crowe starred in his career-defining film Gladiator. Directed by Ridley Scott, the epic historical film was met with major commercial success and acclaim, catapulting Crowe to worldwide stardom and winning him the Best Actor award at the Academy Awards and Critics Choice Awards along with nominations for a BAFTA Award and Golden Globe Award. Crowe was also awarded the Centenary Medal in 2001 for "service to Australian society and Australian film production." In a later interview, Crowe stated the film forever changed his life. He recounted visiting an Italian store where a large crowd gathered outside, yelling his character's first name, Maximus. Many of his lines from the film are considered iconic. Gladiator has been listed among the greatest films of the 21st century.

The next year, he played the leading role in another notable film in his filmography, A Beautiful Mind (2001), delivering an acclaimed performance as the Nobel prize-winning economist and schizophrenic patient John Nash. Crowe, once again, won multiple accolades. At this point in his career, he received three consecutive best actor Oscar nominations, for The Insider, Gladiator, and A Beautiful Mind. All three films were also nominated for Best Picture, and both Gladiator and A Beautiful Mind won the award. Crowe became the first actor to star as the lead in back-to-back Best Picture winners since Walter Pidgeon. Crowe declined the role of Aragorn in Peter Jackson's The Lord of the Rings trilogy since he felt studios were pressuring filmmakers to cast him due to his recent successes.

Within the six-year stretch from 1997 to 2003, Crowe also starred in two other best picture nominees, L.A. Confidential and Master and Commander: The Far Side of the World. In Master and Commander (2003), Crowe delivered another acclaimed performance as Jack Aubrey, a character from the Aubrey–Maturin series of nautical historical novels, upon which the film was based. The movie garnered ten Oscar nominations and various other awards, including a Golden Globe Best Actor nomination for Crowe. It continues to receive positive retrospective reviews despite moderate box office returns at the time of release.

In 2005, he re-teamed with A Beautiful Mind director Ron Howard for the biographical boxing drama Cinderella Man (2005), which has been listed as one of the best in its genre. The film chronicles James J. Braddock's pursuit of the world heavyweight championship amidst the Great Depression. Consistent with Crowe's previous projects, it received many nominations and accolades, while earning Crowe an AACTA Award for the third time.

==== 2006–2014: Established career ====
In 2006, he re-teamed with Gladiator director Ridley Scott for A Good Year, the first of three consecutive collaborations (the second being American Gangster, co-starring again with Denzel Washington, released in late 2007). Although the light romantic comedy of A Good Year was not greatly received, Crowe seemed pleased with the film, telling STV in an interview that he thought it would be enjoyed by fans of his other films. By the latter half of 2000s, Crowe's box office standing declined, as he switched to playing mostly supporting characters, with occasional leading roles. In 2007, he appeared alongside Christian Bale in the Western film 3:10 to Yuma, a remake of the 1957 film of the same name. He followed this up with Ridley Scott's action thriller Body of Lies (2008) co-starring Leonardo DiCaprio. For his portrayal of Ed Hoffman, he underwent a physical transformation, gaining 62 pounds.

He starred in the 2009 political thriller State of Play, based on the BBC drama television series of the same name. Crowe appeared in Robin Hood, a film based on the Robin Hood legend, directed by Ridley Scott and released on 14 May 2010. During the Robin Hood shoot, Crowe fractured both of his legs doing a scene in which he "jumped off a castle portcullis onto rock-hard uneven ground" and said he "never discussed the injury with production, never took a day off because of it, I just kept going to work". Crowe starred in the 2010 Paul Haggis film The Next Three Days, an adaptation of the 2008 French film Pour elle (Anything for Her).

After a year off from acting, Crowe played Jackknife in The Man with the Iron Fists (2012), opposite RZA. He took on the role of Javert in the blockbuster musical film of Les Misérables (2012), and portrayed Superman's biological father, Jor-El, in the Christopher Nolan-produced and Zack Snyder-directed film Man of Steel, released in the summer of 2013. In 2014, he played a gangster in the film adaptation of Mark Helprin's 1983 novel Winter's Tale, and the title role in the Darren Aronofsky's epic religious drama Noah, which earned well financially.

Also in June 2013, Crowe signed to make his directorial debut with the historical drama film The Water Diviner, in which he also starred alongside Jacqueline McKenzie, Olga Kurylenko, and Jai Courtney. Set in the year 1919, the film was produced by Troy Lum, Andrew Mason and Keith Rodger.

==== 2015–present: Recent activities ====
In a 2024 interview, Crowe stated he is content with his career and does not care about other people's reactions anymore, choosing to pursue roles that excite him artistically or otherwise.

In recent years, his notable appearances have included an enforcer for hire in the cult classic The Nice Guys (2016), a major role in The Mummy (2017), starring as an angry driver in the action thriller Unhinged (2020), playing the mythical Greek god Zeus in the Marvel Cinematic Universe film Thor: Love and Thunder (2022), portraying the famous exorcist Fr. Gabriele Amorth in The Pope's Exorcist (2023), and appearing as Nikolai Kravinoff in Kraven The Hunter (2024). He played Hermann Göring in the film Nuremberg (2025), which reunited him with his Man of Steel co-star Michael Shannon.

In 2025, Crowe was honoured by Zurich Film Festival with their Lifetime Achievement Award.

== Music ==
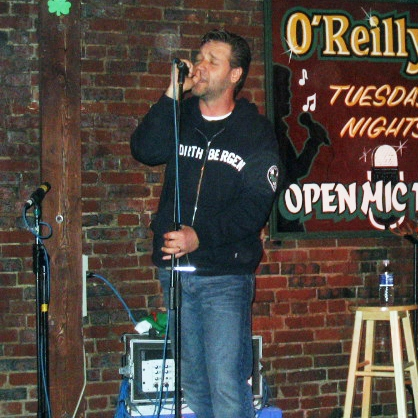
Crowe singing at an open mic night at O'Reilly's Pub in St. John's, Newfoundland and Labrador, Canada, 13 June 2005

In the 1980s, Crowe, under the name of "Russ le Roq", recorded a song titled "I Just Wanna Be Like Marlon Brando".

In the 1980s, Crowe and friend Billy Dean Cochran formed a band, Roman Antix, which later evolved into the Australian rock band 30 Odd Foot of Grunts (abbreviated to TOFOG). Crowe performed lead vocals and guitar for the band, which formed in 1992. The band released The Photograph Kills EP in 1995, as well as three full-length records, Gaslight (1998), Bastard Life or Clarity (2001) and Other Ways of Speaking (2003). In 2000, TOFOG performed shows in London, Los Angeles and in Austin, Texas. In 2001, the band toured in the U.S. with dates in Austin, Boulder, Chicago, Portland, San Francisco, Hollywood, Philadelphia, New York City and the last show at The Stone Pony in Asbury Park, New Jersey.

In early 2005, 30 Odd Foot of Grunts as a group had "dissolved/evolved" with Crowe feeling his future music would take a new direction. He began a collaboration with Alan Doyle of the Canadian band Great Big Sea, and with it a new band emerged, the Ordinary Fear of God, which also involved some members of the previous TOFOG line-up. A new single, "Raewyn", was released in April 2005 and an album entitled My Hand, My Heart was released. The album includes a tribute song to actor Richard Harris, who became Crowe's friend during the making of Gladiator.

Crowe and his new band the Ordinary Fear of God (keeping the TOFOG acronym) toured Australia in 2005, and then the U.S. In 2006 they returned to the US to promote their new release My Hand, My Heart. In March 2010, the group's version of the John Williamson song "Winter Green" was included on a new compilation album The Absolute Best of John Williamson: 40 Years True Blue, commemorating the singer-songwriter's milestone of 40 years in the Australian music industry.

On 2 August 2011, the third collaboration between Crowe and Doyle was released on iTunes as The Crowe/Doyle Songbook Vol III, featuring nine original songs followed by their acoustic demo counterparts (for a total of 18 tracks). Danielle Spencer does guest vocals on most tracks. The release coincided with a pair of live performances at the LSPU Hall in St. John's, Newfoundland and Labrador, Canada. The digital album was released as download versions only on Amazon.com, iTunes, Spotify. The album has since charted at No. 72 on the Canadian Albums Chart.

On 26 September 2011, Crowe appeared onstage at Rogers Arena in Vancouver in the middle of Keith Urban's concert. He sang a cover of "Folsom Prison Blues", before joining the rest of the band in a rendition of "The Joker". On 18 August 2012, Crowe appeared along with Doyle at the Harpa Concert Hall in Reykjavík, Iceland as part of the city's Menningarnótt program.

In 2017, Crowe and Doyle had created a new act (with his fellow Les Mis co-star, Samantha Barks, Scott Grimes and Carl Falk) called Indoor Garden Party who appeared on The One Show to promote their album called The Musical.

On 27 June 2023, Crowe sang in concert with his band Indoor Garden Party in Bologna at the Teatro Comunale Nouveau. The concert was very successful, completely sold out. The total proceeds from the concert were entirely donated to the flood victims of Emilia-Romagna.

== Philanthropy ==
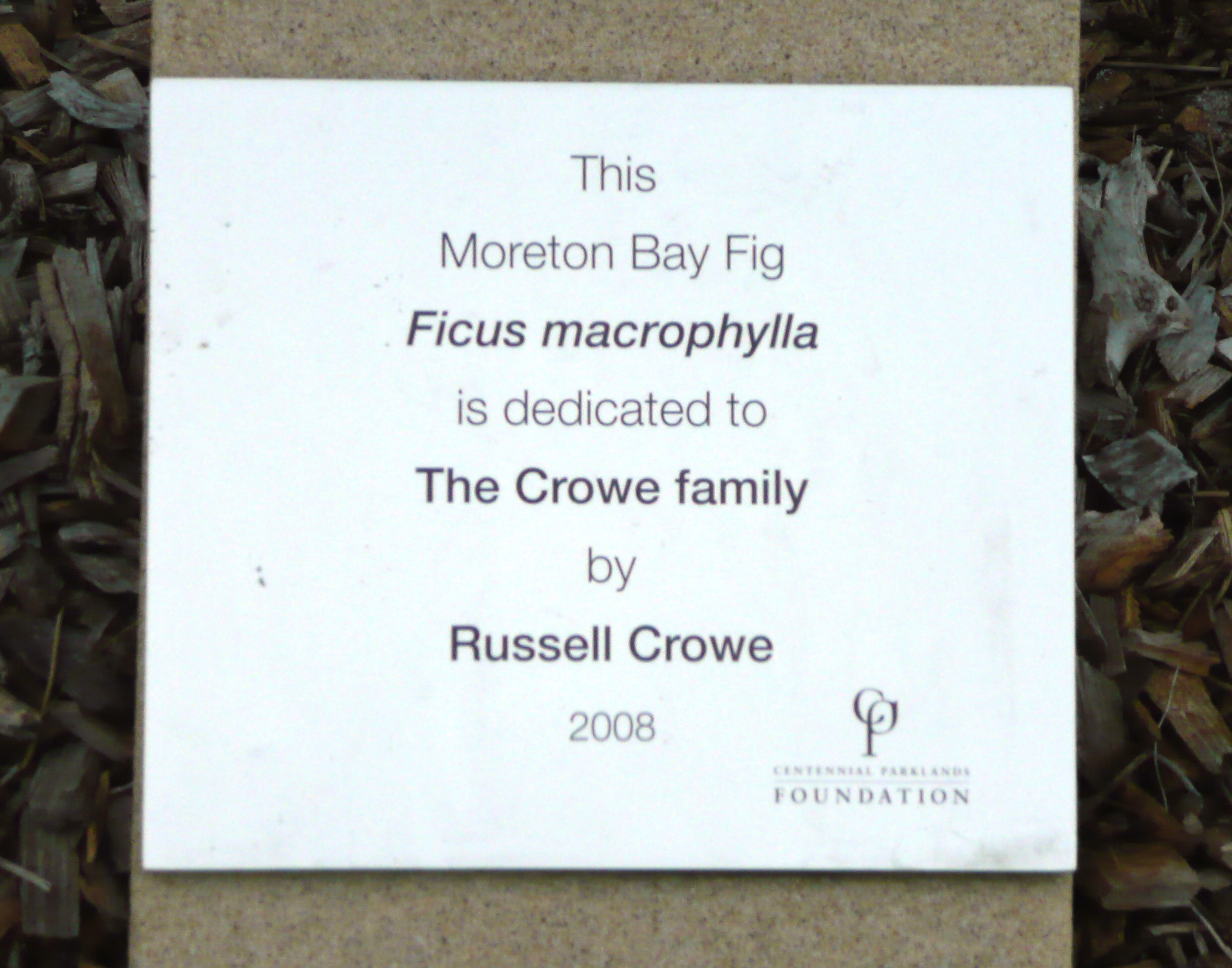
Moreton Bay fig donated by the Crowe family in Centennial Park, New South Wales

During location filming of Cinderella Man, Crowe made a donation to a Jewish elementary school whose library had been damaged as a result of arson. A note with an anti-Semitic message had been left at the scene. Crowe called school officials to express his concern and wanted his message relayed to the students. The school's building fund received donations from throughout Canada and the amount of Crowe's donation was not disclosed.

On another occasion, Crowe donated A$200,000 to a struggling primary school near his home in rural Australia. The money went towards an A$800,000 project to construct a swimming pool at the school. Crowe's sympathies were sparked when a pupil drowned at the nearby Coffs Harbour beach in 2001, and he felt the pool would help students become better swimmers and improve their water safety. At the opening ceremony, he dived into the pool fully clothed as soon as it was declared open. Nana Glen principal Laurie Renshall said, "The many things he does up here, people just don't know about. We've been trying to get a pool for 10 years."

In August 2020, Crowe donated US$5,000 to a fundraiser on GoFundMe by filmmaker Amanda Bailly and journalist Richard Hall to help rebuild Le Chef, a restaurant which was destroyed in the 2020 Beirut explosion. The fundraiser aimed to raise US$15,000, but it had raised approximately US$19,000 as of 16 August. In response to Hall noting the donation, Crowe tweeted: "On behalf of Anthony Bourdain. I thought he probably would have done so if he was still around. I wish you and Le Chef the best and hope things can be put back together soon."

In June 2023, Crowe agreed with the organisers of a concert of his band Indoor Garden Party in Bologna to donate the full revenue to the victims of the Emilia-Romagna floods.

== Sport ==
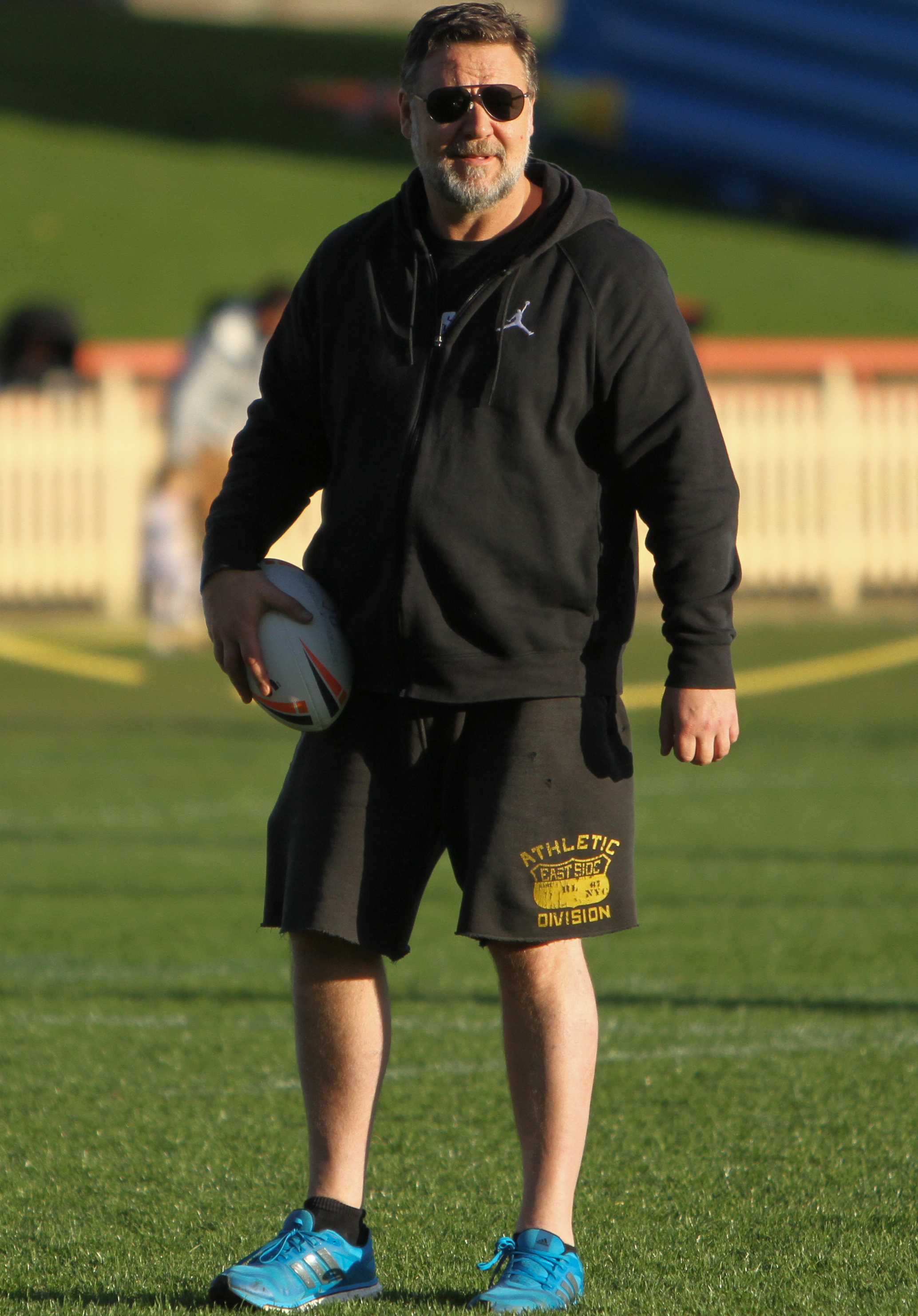
Crowe on the pitch at a North Sydney Bears game in 2017

=== Rugby league ===
He has been the co-owner of the National Rugby League (NRL) team South Sydney Rabbitohs since 2006; Crowe has been a supporter of the team since childhood. After his rise to fame as an actor, he has continued appearing at home games and supported the financially troubled club. Following the Super League war of the 1990s, he made an attempt to use his Hollywood connections to convince Ted Turner, a rival of Super League's Rupert Murdoch, to save the Rabbitohs before they were forced from the NRL competition for two years. In 1999, Crowe paid A$42,000 at auction for the brass bell used to open the inaugural rugby league match in Australia in 1908 at a fundraiser to assist Souths' legal battle for re-inclusion in the league. In 2005, he made the Rabbitohs the first club team in Australia to be sponsored by a film, when he negotiated a deal to advertise his film Cinderella Man on their jerseys. On 19 March 2006, the voting members of the South Sydney club voted (in a 75.8% majority) to allow Crowe and businessman Peter Holmes à Court to purchase 75% of the organisation, leaving 25% ownership with the members. It cost them A$3 million, and they received four of eight seats on the board of directors. A six-part television miniseries entitled South Side Story depicting the takeover aired in Australia in 2007. On 5 November 2006, Crowe appeared on The Tonight Show with Jay Leno to announce that Firepower International was sponsoring the South Sydney Rabbitohs for US$3 million over three years, showing viewers a Rabbitoh playing jersey with Firepower's name emblazoned on it.

Crowe helped to organise a rugby league game that took place at the University of North Florida, in Jacksonville, Florida, between the South Sydney Rabbitohs and the 2007 Super League Grand Final winners the Leeds Rhinos on 26 January 2008 (Australia Day). Crowe told ITV Local Yorkshire the game was not a marketing exercise. Crowe wrote a letter of apology to a Sydney newspaper following the sacking of South Sydney's coach Jason Taylor and one of their players David Fa'alogo after a drunken altercation between the two at the end of the 2009 NRL season. Also in 2009, Crowe persuaded young England international forward Sam Burgess to sign with the Rabbitohs over other clubs that were competing for his signature, after inviting Burgess and his mother to the set of Robin Hood, which he was filming in Britain at the time.

Crowe's influence helped to persuade noted player Greg Inglis to renege on his deal to join the Brisbane Broncos and sign for the Rabbitohs for 2011. In 2010, the NRL was investigating Crowe's business relationships with a number of media and entertainment companies including Channel Nine, Channel Seven, ANZ Stadium and V8 Supercars in relation to the South Sydney Rabbitohs' salary cap.

In 2011, Souths also announced a corporate partnership with the bookmaking conglomerate Luxbet. Previously, Crowe had been prominent in trying to prevent gambling being associated with the Rabbitohs. In May 2011, Crowe helped arrange to have Fox broadcast the 2011 State of Origin series live for the first time in the United States, in addition to the NRL Grand Final. In November 2012 the South Sydney Rabbitohs confirmed that Russell Crowe was selling his 37.5 per cent stake in the club. At the Rabbitohs Annual General Meeting on 3 March 2013, Chairman Nick Pappas claimed Crowe "would not be selling his shareholding in the short-to-medium term and at this stage has no intention of selling at all".

Crowe was a guest presenter at the 2013 Dally M Awards and presented the prestigious Dally M Medal to winner Cooper Cronk. Russell was present at the 2014 NRL Grand Final when the Rabbitohs won the NRL premiership for the first time in 43 years.

=== Other sporting interests ===
Two of his cousins, Martin Crowe and Jeff Crowe, captained the New Zealand national cricket team.

Crowe watches and plays cricket, and captained the 'Australian' Team containing Steve Waugh against an English side in the 'Hollywood Ashes' Cricket Match. On 17 July 2009, Crowe took to the commentary box for British sports channel Sky Sports as the 'third man' during the second Test of the 2009 Ashes series, between England and Australia.

Crowe is a fan of the New Zealand All Blacks rugby team.

He is friends with Lloyd Carr, the former coach of the University of Michigan Wolverines American football team, and Carr used Crowe's movie Cinderella Man to motivate his 2006 team following a 7–5 season the previous year. Upon hearing of this, Crowe called Carr and invited him to Australia to address his rugby league team, the South Sydney Rabbitohs, which Carr did the following summer. In September 2007, after Carr came under fire following the Wolverines' 0–2 start, Crowe travelled to Ann Arbor, Michigan for the Wolverines' 15 September game against Notre Dame to show his support for Carr. He addressed the team before the game and watched from the sidelines as the Wolverines defeated the Irish 38–0. Crowe is also a fan of the National Football League. On 22 October 2007, Crowe appeared in the booth of a Monday night game between the Indianapolis Colts and the Jacksonville Jaguars.

He is also a fan of Leeds United and narrated the Amazon Prime documentary Take Us Home: Leeds United.

Crowe has revealed in Italian media that he is a Lazio fan as well.

== Personal life ==
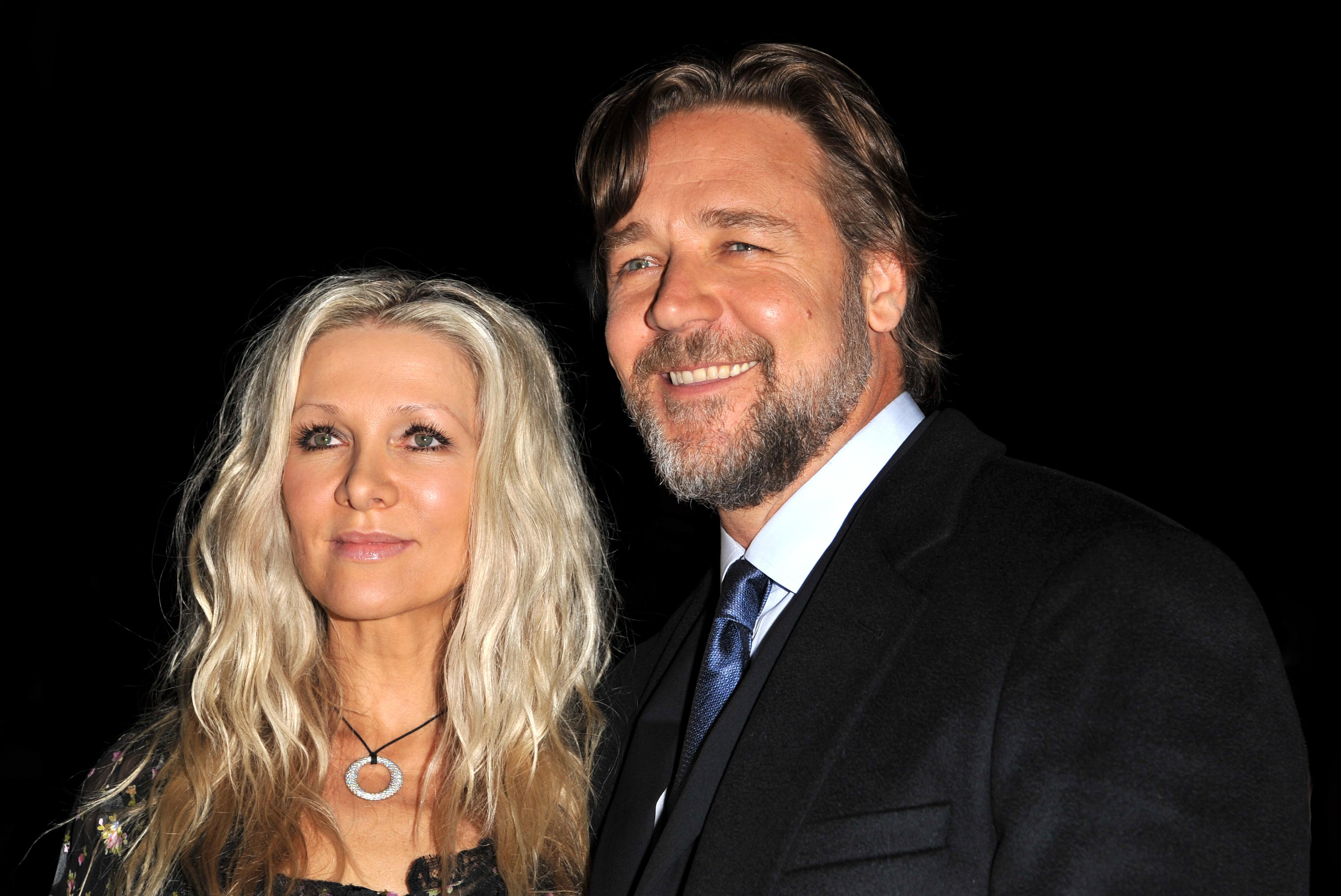
Crowe with then-wife Danielle Spencer in September 2011

In 1989, Crowe met Australian singer Danielle Spencer while working on the film The Crossing and the two began an on-again, off-again relationship. In 2000, he became romantically involved with American actress Meg Ryan while working on their film Proof of Life. In 2001, Crowe and Spencer reconciled, and they married two years later in April 2003. The wedding took place at Crowe's cattle property in Nana Glen, New South Wales, with the ceremony taking place on Crowe's 39th birthday. The couple have two sons. In October 2012, it was reported that Crowe and Spencer had separated. They divorced in April 2018.

A longtime resident of Nana Glen, Crowe is well known in the community and is a frequent patron of the local rugby games. During the Australian bushfires in 2019 and 2020, he raised over A$400,000 for the New South Wales Rural Fire Service (NSW RFS) by selling his South Sydney Rabbitohs hat in an online auction.

On 9 March 2005, Crowe revealed to GQ magazine that prior to his attending the 73rd Academy Awards, FBI agents had approached him and told him that the terrorist group al-Qaeda wanted to kidnap him. He recalled, "It was something to do with some recording picked up by a French policewoman, I think, in either Libya or Algiers... it was about taking iconographic Americans out of the picture as a sort of cultural destabilisation plan."

At the beginning of 2009, Crowe appeared in a series of Australian special-edition postage stamps called "Legends of the Screen", featuring Australian actors. Crowe, Geoffrey Rush, Cate Blanchett, and Nicole Kidman each appear twice in the series, once as themselves and once as their Academy Award-nominated character. Crowe is the only non-Australian to appear in the stamps.

In June 2010, Crowe, who started smoking when he was 10, announced he had quit for the sake of his two sons. In November, he told David Letterman that he had smoked more than 60 cigarettes a day for 36 years, and that he had "fallen off the wagon" the night before the interview and smoked heavily.

In 2011, Crowe declared his opposition to the practice of non-medical circumcision on Twitter, referring to it as "barbaric and stupid". He specifically called for Jews to abolish the practice. Crowe's comments led to accusations of antisemitism, which he denied.

=== Citizenship ===
In 2015, it was reported that Crowe had applied for Australian citizenship in 2006 and again in 2013 but was rejected because he failed to fulfil the residency requirements. However, Australia's Immigration Department said it had no record of any such application by Crowe.

=== Ambassador of Rome in the world ===
On 20 December 2022, Crowe was appointed by the mayor of Rome to be the city's ambassador in the world. On the day of the appointment, Crowe declared that it would be important to host the next FIFA World Cup in Italy.

=== Political views ===
Crowe has supported the Australian Labor Party (ALP). He endorsed former Australian prime minister Julia Gillard in June 2013, and narrated an advertisement for the Labor Party's election campaign in May 2022. Crowe has been an outspoken critic of Australia's immigration detention facilities, describing them as "a nation's shame" and "fucking disgraceful". In November 2017, Crowe offered to resettle displaced refugees who were held in Australia's offshore detention facility on Manus Island.

=== Honorary officer rank ===
As of 24 February 2026, Russell Crowe is an honorary officer in the Royal Australian Navy (RAN), holding the rank of Commander. The RAN recognised Crowe for his long term advocacy for the Navy, his rank being appointed by the Chief of Navy Vice Admiral Mark Hammond. The appointment took place on HMAS Sydney (DDG 42) , while in port at Fleet Base East, Sydney, and the appointment lasts indefinitely or until terminated by the RAN.

=== Altercations ===
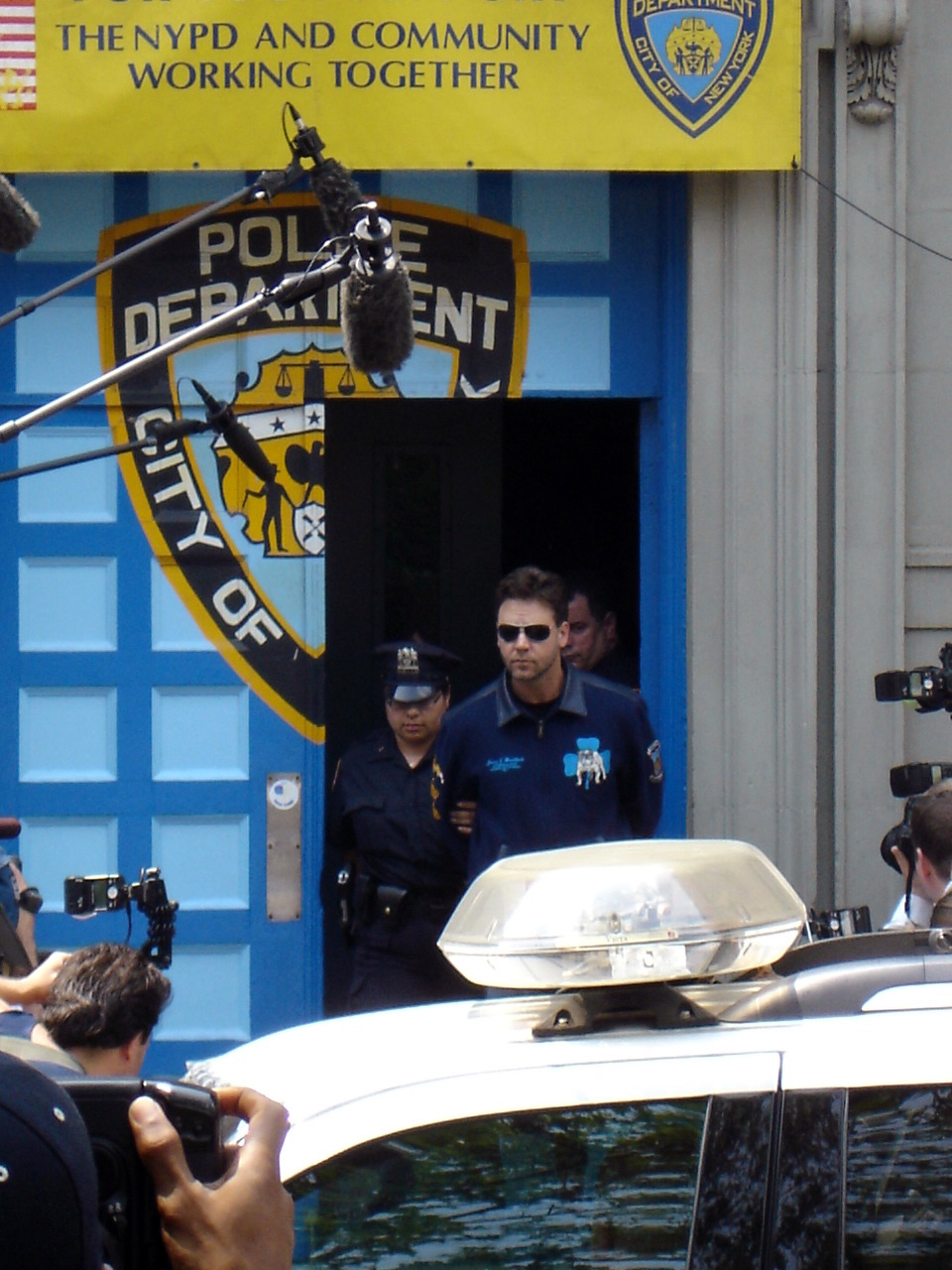
Crowe escorted by the NYPD in handcuffs to his arraignment for the phone-throwing incident, 6 June 2005

Between 1999 and 2005, Crowe was involved in four altercations. These altercations gave him a reputation for having a bad temper.

In 1999, Crowe was involved in an altercation with a woman at the Plantation Hotel in Coffs Harbour. He was caught on a security camera kissing a man who was trying to placate him. Two men were acquitted of using the video in an attempt to blackmail him.

In 2002, when part of Crowe's appearance at that year's BAFTA Awards was cut out to fit into the BBC's tape-delayed broadcast, Crowe used strong language during an argument with producer Malcolm Gerrie. The part cut was a Patrick Kavanagh poem in tribute to actor Richard Harris, which was cut for copyright reasons. Crowe later apologised, saying, "What I said to him may have been a little bit more passionate than now, in the cold light of day, I would have liked it to have been."

Later in 2002, Crowe was alleged to have been involved in a brawl with businessman Eric Watson inside the London branch of Zuma, a Japanese restaurant chain. The fight was broken up by English actor Ross Kemp.

In June 2005, Crowe was arrested and charged with second-degree assault by the NYPD after he threw a telephone at the concierge of the Mercer Hotel who had refused to help him place a call when the system did not work from Crowe's room. He was also charged with fourth-degree criminal possession of a weapon (the telephone). The concierge was treated for a facial laceration. Crowe later described the incident as "possibly the most shameful situation that I've ever gotten myself in". Crowe pleaded guilty and was conditionally discharged. Before the trial, he settled a lawsuit filed by the concierge, Nestor Estrada. Terms of the settlement were not disclosed, but amounts in the six-figure range have been reported.

The telephone incident had a generally negative impact on Crowe's public image, although Crowe had made a point of befriending Australian journalists in an effort to influence his image. The South Park episode "The New Terrance and Phillip Movie Trailer" revolves around a lampooning of his aggressive tendencies. Crowe commented on the ongoing media coverage in November 2010, during an interview with American television talk show host and journalist Charlie Rose: "I think it indelibly changed me. It was a very, very minor situation that was made into something outrageous. More violence was perpetrated on me walking between the car to the courtroom with the waiting media than anything I'd done ... it very definitely affected me ... psychologically."

In October 2016, Azealia Banks filed a police report against Crowe, claiming that he choked and spat at her before proceeding to call her a nigger during a party in his hotel suite. However, the Los Angeles District Attorney's office dropped the case in December. The following year during an interview with The Breakfast Club, RZA, who was himself at the party, acknowledged only Banks' claim that Crowe had spat, though "on the floor" rather than at her directly, going on to condemn her alleged "obnoxious and erratic" behaviour. Crowe asserted that he removed Banks from the premises because she had threatened to physically assault other attendees. RZA denied hearing Crowe use racial slurs and confirmed Crowe's account of threats of violence by Banks, saying "[Banks] threatened to cut a girl in the face with a glass, then actually [grabbed] a glass and physically [attacked] for no logical reason. Russell blocked the attack and removed her from the suite."

== Filmography and awards ==
Crowe's most acclaimed and highest-grossing films, according to the online portal Box Office Mojo and the review aggregate site Rotten Tomatoes, include The Quick and the Dead (1995) L.A. Confidential (1997), The Insider (1999), Gladiator (2000), A Beautiful Mind (2001), Master and Commander: The Far Side of the World (2003), 3:10 to Yuma (2007), State of Play (2009), Robin Hood (2010), Les Misérables (2012), Man of Steel (2013), Noah (2014), The Nice Guys (2016), The Mummy (2017), Thor: Love and Thunder (2022), and Land of Bad (2024).

Crowe won an Academy Award in the Best Actor category for his performance in Gladiator, and has been nominated two more times for Best Actor for The Insider and A Beautiful Mind, making him the ninth actor to have received three consecutive Academy Award nominations. He won the Golden Globe Award for Best Actor – Motion Picture Drama for A Beautiful Mind and Best Actor – Miniseries or Television Film for The Loudest Voice (2019); He has been nominated four more times: Best Actor in a Drama for The Insider, Gladiator, Master and Commander: The Far Side of the World, and Cinderella Man.

On 27 February 2026, Crowe was appointed an honorary commander in the Royal Australian Navy for "enduring advocacy for the Royal Australian Navy, his contribution to public understanding through storytelling and support of the defence community."

== See also ==
- List of Academy Award winners and nominees from New Zealand
- List of NRL club owners – List of club owners in the National Rugby League (NRL)
- Russell Crowe's jockstrap – Garment in the 2005 film Cinderella Man
