= Metal Skin =

- Directed by: Geoffrey Wright
- Written by: Geoffrey Wright
- Produced by: Daniel Scharf
- Starring: Aden Young; Tara Morice; Nadine Garner; Ben Mendelsohn
- Cinematography: Ron Hagen
- Edited by: Bill Murphy; Jane Usher
- Music by: John Clifford White
- Distributed by: Village Roadshow
- Release dates: 14 September 1994 (Toronto International Film Festival); 4 May 1995 (Australia)
- Running time: 109 minutes
- Country: Australia
- Language: English

Metal Skin is a 1994 Australian film written and directed by Geoffrey Wright, starring Aden Young, Tara Morice, Nadine Garner and Ben Mendelsohn. The film follows the lives of four adolescents in and around the blue-collar Melbourne suburb of Altona.

At the ARIA Music Awards of 1995, the album was nominated for ARIA Award for Best Original Soundtrack, Cast or Show Album.

== Plot ==
Joe lives with his brain-damaged father in working-class Altona, suburban Melbourne. Joe has problems taking care of his father, as he is disruptive and dangerous due to his deteriorating mental health. A shy misfit whose great love is souped-up muscle cars, Joe gets a job at the supermarket where he is befriended by fellow car enthusiast Dazey, after walking in on him having sex in the break room. Dazey is a confident womaniser at a crossroads with his girlfriend, Roslyn, whom Joe has feelings for.

Dazey's brother is a Nascar driver and along with their father runs a car garage. Dazey gets parts for Joe from the family shop. Joe beats an attacker of Dazey's at the shop, a boyfriend of a woman he slept with.

Savina, a devil worshipper who works with Dazey and Joe, feigns interest in him to get closer to Dazey. Savina has been obsessed with Dazey since high school. She frequently engages in dark mysticism, such as animal sacrifice. The four of them go to street races and get drunk together.

Joe begins to have feelings for Savina. Savina and Dazey have sex which only fuels her obsession, although he has no intentions of it leading to anything else. Savina falls to her death at a church after becoming extremely depressed, saddening Joe as the two of them had started to fall in love with each other. Joe's house is vandalised, and Dazey deals with his own feelings of grief and guilt.

As Joe dreams of the dead Savina, he is awakened by his Pops banging on the ceiling. Joe freaks out and shoots his father in the head, killing him. He then drives to the mechanic shop and shoots Ted, a worker at Dazey's father's workshop. He then goes to Roslyn's house, where Dazey is.

He threatens Dazey as Roslyn tries to talk him down. Joe tells Roslyn that she could be with him. Joe and Roslyn embrace and then Joe turns the gun back on Dazey who is crying and lying on the ground. Roslyn hits Joe over the head with a mask and she and Dazey run to a car and speed off. Joe gets up quickly and pursues them in his car. After an intense chase they both crash at the docks. Roslyn gets out of the car, before Joe backs up into Dazey, causing another wreck. Joe dies from his injuries as Roslyn wanders off. Dazey, dazed and confused, gets out of his car and calls for Roslyn, unable to find her.

== Cast ==
- Aden Young as Joe
- Tara Morice as Savina
- Nadine Garner as Roslyn
- Ben Mendelsohn as Dazey
- Chantal Contouri as Savina's mother
- Petru Gheorghiu as Pop
- Arthur Angel as Paul Secchi
- Richard Sutherland as Rosco
- Tommy Dysart as Mr Graham
- Mike Bishop as Dazey's father

== Reception ==
Despite generally positive reviews and selection in the 1994 Venice Film Festival, Metal Skin proved a disappointment at the Australian box office when it was released on 4 May 1995 where it grossed $883,521. Australian critic Andrew Howe praised it as "a dark, arresting ode to suburban hopelessness"; however, Todd McCarthy writing in Variety described the film as "so overwrought and unrelievedly grim that it comes close to playing like a parody of teenage angst movies."

=== Awards ===
It won AFI Awards in 1995 for Best Production Design (Steven Jones-Evans) and Best Sound (Frank Lipson, David Lee, Steve Burgess, Peter Burgess, Glenn Newnham) and received nominations for Best Actor (Aden Young), Supporting Actor (Ben Mendelsohn), Supporting Actress (Nadine Garner) and Costume Design (Anna Borghesi). Aden Young and Ben Mendelsohn shared the Film Critics Circle of Australia prize for Best Actor.

== Novelisation ==
The novelisation of Metal Skin was written by Jocelyn Harewood and published by Text Publishing in 1995. Harewood follows the film closely; however, the book explores other sides of the characters: Joe's inner rage at his brain-damaged father and his love for what his father has been; Savina's destructive witchcraft; Dazey's moments of self-awareness and higher motives. It was published as an ebook in November 2012 and made available on Harewood's website.

== See also ==
- Cinema of Australia
