= John Clifford White =

Australian composer

John Clifford White is an Australian composer. His film credits include Romper Stomper. The Heartbreak Kid, Metal Skin, and Macbeth.

== Accolades ==
Australian Film Institute Awards

Won. 1992 Best Original Music Score for Romper Stomper
Nominated. 2006 Best Original Music Score for Macbeth

ARIA Award

Won. 1993 ARIA Award for Best Original Soundtrack, Cast or Show Album for Romper Stomper

Film Critics Circle of Australia Awards

Won. 1995 Best Music Score for Metal Skin
Nominated. 2006 Best Music Score for Macbeth

IF Awards

Nominated. 2006 Best Music for Macbeth

Screen Music Awards

Won. 1993 Best Film Score for Romper Stomper
Nominated. 2002 Best Television Theme for John Callahan's Quads
Nominated. 2002 Best Original Song Composed for a Feature Film, Telemovie, TV Series or Mini-Series for John Callahan's Quads
