= Take Us Home: Leeds United =

Documentary sports series on Leeds United

Take Us Home: Leeds United is a behind-the-scenes docuseries which debuted on Amazon Prime in August 2019. The show follows Leeds United F.C. and their head coach Marcelo Bielsa as they attempt to get promoted to the Premier League after being out of it for 16 years.

The series is narrated by Russell Crowe and produced by Eleven Studios, in partnership with Leeds-based The City Talking.

== Season 1 (2019) ==
The first season closely follows Marcelo Bielsa's team throughout the 2018–19 season, including "Spygate" and how the club handled the resulting fallout. The failed Dan James transfer from Swansea City to Leeds in January 2019 is also featured with extensive footage. The first episode of the series premiered at Everyman cinema in Leeds on 14 August 2019. The season ends with Leeds United losing in the EFL Championship play-offs to Derby County F.C., thus failing to make it to the Premier League.

== Season 2 (2020) ==
The second season follows the club through the 2019–20 season as the team looks to improve on the previous year. Their campaign is interrupted by the COVID-19 pandemic and the season is stopped indefinitely at the end of the first half of the story. The second half of the series follows the team through to the end of the season as they look to seal a place back in the Premier League. The season ends with Leeds United being promoted to the Premier League for the first time in 16 years.

== Reception ==
The Guardian called Take Us Home: Leeds United "expensively and beautifully made" with "enough super slo-mo shots ... and match footage from cool, unexpected angles to keep you interested." The Guardian also noted that "it feels like some curious propaganda exercise for [ Andrea Radrizzani ]", the team's owner and also owner of Eleven Studios.
