= Geoffrey Wright =

Australian film director and screenwriter

- Born: 1959 (age 66–67); Melbourne, Victoria, Australia
- Occupations: Film director, screenwriter
- Years active: 1980–present

Geoffrey Wright is an Australian film director and screenwriter. He is best known for his 1992 film Romper Stomper, about a group of skinhead neo-Nazis starring Russell Crowe featuring scenes of graphic violence.

In 1994 he directed the gritty suburban thriller film Metal Skin, starring Ben Mendelsohn, and later directed the teen horror film Cherry Falls, starring Brittany Murphy. Between these two, he attempted to do a film, Instinct, for Mandalay Entertainment and Roger Birnbaum, but it was cancelled before casting and filming ever started.

In 2006 he adapted Shakespeare's Macbeth for film, starring Sam Worthington, Lachy Hulme and Victoria Hill who also co-wrote and produced the film.

== Filmography ==
=== Film ===
Year	Title	Director	Writer	Notes
1989	Lover Boy	Yes	Yes	Short film
1992	Romper Stomper	Yes	Yes	
1994	Metal Skin	Yes	Yes	
1999	Cherry Falls	Yes		
2006	Macbeth	Yes	Yes	

=== Television ===
Year	Title	Director	Writer	Notes
1996	Naked: Stories of Men	Yes		Episode: "A Fallen Woman"
2018	Romper Stomper	Yes	Yes	
