= The Black Sorrows discography =

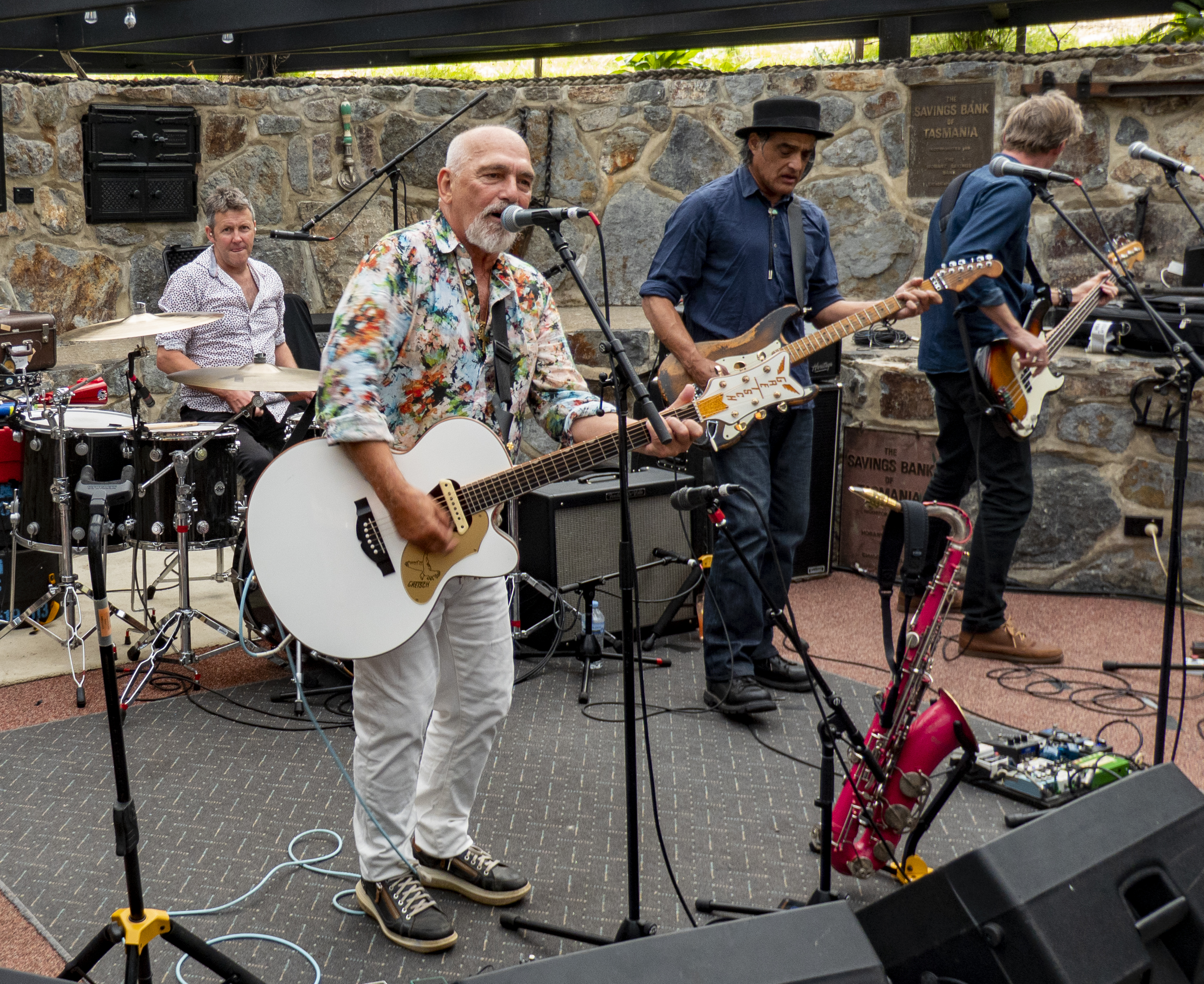
- The Black Sorrows in 2021
- Studio albums: 20
- Live albums: 3
- Compilation albums: 3

The Black Sorrows are an Australian blues rock band formed in 1983 by mainstay vocalist Joe Camilleri. The band is most well known for their songs "Chained to the Wheel", "Harley + Rose" and "Never Let Me Go", released in the late '80s and early '90s. Faithful Satellite, released in September 2016, is the band's 18th studio album. Citizen John was released in March 2019.

The band have had three albums peak inside the top 10 on the ARIA Albums Chart. Their top 40 singles are "Chained to the Wheel" (February 1989), "Harley + Rose" (August 1990) and "Snake Skin Shoes" (July 1994).

== Albums ==
=== Studio albums ===
| Title | Details | Peak chart positions | | | | Notes |
| Title | Details | AUS | NOR | NZ | SWE | Notes |
|---|---|---|---|---|---|---|
| Sonola | Released: June 1984; Label: Spirit | 50 | — | — | — | |
| Rockin' Zydeco | Released: March 1985; Label: Spirit | — | — | — | — | |
| A Place in the World | Released: November 1985; Label: Spirit | — | — | — | — | |
| Dear Children | Released: April 1987; Label: CBS | 22 | — | — | — | |
| Hold on to Me | Released: September 1988; Label: CBS | 7 | 6 | 35 | 18 | |
| Harley and Rose | Released: August 1990; Label: CBS | 3 | 5 | — | 36 | ARIA: 2× Platinum |
| Better Times | Released: September 1992; Label: Columbia | 13 | — | — | — | |
| Lucky Charm | Released: November 1994; Label: Columbia | 20 | — | — | — | |
| Beat Club | Released: November 1998; Label: Mushroom | — | — | — | — | |
| One Mo' Time | Released: August 2004; Label: Liberation | — | — | — | — | |
| Roarin' Town | Released: October 2006; Label: Warner Music | — | — | — | — | |
| 4 Days in Sing Sing | Released: September 2009; Label: Head | — | — | — | — | |
| Crooked Little Thoughts | Released: 24 February 2012; Label: Head | — | — | — | — | |
| Certified Blue | Released: 4 April 2014; Label: Head | 73 | — | — | — | No. 5 on 2014 Jazz and Blues Australian year-end chart; No. 49 on 2015 Jazz and Blues Australian year-end chart. |
| Endless Sleep Chapter 46 | Released: 13 April 2015; Label: Head | — | — | — | — | Nominated for the ARIA Award for Best Blues and Roots Album in 2015 |
| Endless Sleep Chapter 47 | Released: 13 April 2015; Label: Head | — | — | — | — | |
| Faithful Satellite | Released: 16 September 2016; Label: Head | — | — | — | — | |
| Citizen John | Released: 29 March 2019; Label: Bloodlines, Mushroom | 11 | — | — | — | |
| Saint Georges Road | Released: 10 September 2021; Label: Ambition | 14 | — | — | — | No. 8 on 2021 Jazz and Blues Australian year-end chart.; No. 26 on 2022 Jazz and Blues Australian year-end chart.; No. 26 on 2022 Jazz and Blues Australian year-end chart.; No. 36 on 2023 Jazz and Blues Australian year-end chart. |
| The Way We Do Business | Released: 18 October 2024; Label: Black Sorrows / ABC | — | — | — | — | No. 9 on 2024 Jazz and Blues Australian year-end chart.; No. 20 on 2025 Jazz and Blues Australian year-end chart. |
"—" denotes releases that did not chart.

=== Live albums ===
| Title | Details |
|---|---|
| Radio Waves | Released: March 1996; Label: Mushroom; Contains three discs |
| Live! At the Palms | Released: 2019 (Germany); Label: Blue Rose; Recorded live at the Palms Crown, Melbourne, October 2018 |
| Live at the Shangri-La | Released: July 2025; Label: ABC |

=== Compilations ===
| Title | Details | Peak chart positions | | Certifications |
| Title | Details | AUS | NZ | Certifications |
|---|---|---|---|---|
| The Chosen Ones – Greatest Hits | Released: November 1993; Label: Columbia | 4 | 23 | ARIA: Platinum; No. 50 on the 1994 year-end Australian chart. |
| The Very Best of The Black Sorrows | Released: November 1997; Label: Mushroom | — | — | |
| The Essential Black Sorrows | Released: 28 July 2007; Label: Sony BMG | — | — | |
| The Quintessential Black Sorrows | Released: 24 October 2025; Label: ABC/ORCH | 50 | — | No. 13 on 2025 Jazz and Blues Australian year-end chart. |
"—" denotes releases that did not chart.

== Singles ==
| Year | Title | Chart positions | | Album |
| Year | Title | AUS | NZ | Album |
|---|---|---|---|---|
| 1984 | "Brown Eyed Girl"/"What a Difference a Day Makes" | — | — | Sonola |
| 1985 | "Shape I'm In" | — | — | Rockin' Zydeco |
| 1985 | "Sons of the Sea" | — | — | A Place in the World |
| 1986 | "Country Girls" | — | — | A Place in the World |
| 1987 | "Daughters of Glory" | 48 | — | Dear Children |
| 1987 | "Maybe Tomorrow" | 91 | — | Dear Children |
| 1987 | "The Last Frontier" | — | — | Dear Children |
| 1988 | "Hold on to Me" | 41 | — | Hold On to Me |
| 1988 | "The Chosen Ones" | 65 | 32 | Hold On to Me |
| 1989 | "Chained to the Wheel" | 9 | 42 | Hold On to Me |
| 1989 | "The Crack Up" | 40 | — | Hold On to Me |
| 1989 | "Fire Down Below" | 74 | — | Hold On to Me |
| 1990 | "Harley + Rose" | 24 | — | Harley and Rose |
| 1990 | "Angel Street" | 97 | — | Harley and Rose |
| 1991 | "Never Let Me Go" | 30 | — | Harley and Rose |
| 1991 | "Hold It Up to the Mirror" | 97 | — | Harley and Rose |
| 1992 | "Ain't Love the Strangest Thing" | 46 | — | Better Times |
| 1992 | "Better Times" | 74 | — | Better Times |
| 1993 | "Come On, Come On" | 70 | — | Better Times |
| 1993 | "Sweet Inspiration" | 136 | — | Better Times |
| 1993 | "Stir It Up" | 58 | 20 | The Chosen Ones – Greatest Hits |
| 1994 | "Snake Skin Shoes" | 16 | — | Lucky Charm |
| 1994 | "Last One Standing for You" (with Jon Stevens) | 46 | — | Lucky Charm |
| 1995 | "Lucky Charm" | 158 | — | Lucky Charm |
| 1997 | "New Craze" | 177 | — | Beat Club |
| 2016 | "Fix My Bail" | — | — | Faithful Satellite |
| 2016 | "It Ain't Ever Gonna Happen" | — | — | Faithful Satellite |
| 2017 | "Raise Your Hands" | — | — | Faithful Satellite |
| 2018 | "Silvio" | — | — | Citizen John |
| 2019 | "Wednesday's Child" | — | — | Citizen John |
| 2021 | "Livin' Like Kings" | — | — | Saint Georges Road |
| 2021 | "Revolutionary Blues" | — | — | Saint Georges Road |
| 2021 | "Chiquita" | — | — | Saint Georges Road |
| 2022 | "Saint Georges Road" | — | — | Saint Georges Road |
| 2023 | "A Little Love" (with Joe Camilleri and Darlinghurst) | — | — | Non-album single |
| 2024 | "One Door Slams" | — | — | The Way We Do Business |
| 2024 | "Crazy Look" | — | — | The Way We Do Business |
| 2025 | "For Your Love" | — | — | The Quintessential Black Sorrows |
