= The Chosen Ones – Greatest Hits =

Greatest hits album by The Black Sorrows
- Released: 1 November 1993
- Recorded: 1984–1993
- Label: Columbia Records
- Producer: Joe Camilleri, Jeff Burstin, Peter Luscombe

The Black Sorrows chronology
Better Times (1992)	The Chosen Ones – Greatest Hits (1993)	Lucky Charm (1994)

Singles from The Chosen Ones – Greatest Hits
- 1. "Stir It Up" Released: September 1993

The Chosen Ones – Greatest Hits is the first greatest hits album by Australian blues and roots band, The Black Sorrows. It includes tracks from all but one of their seven studio albums to date. There are no tracks from Rockin' Zydeco (1985).

The album debuted at number 28 on the ARIA Charts and peaked at number 4 in January 1994. The album was certified platinum.

The album was re-released on CD in August 2016 as part of Sony Music Australia's 'Gold Series'.

== Track listing ==
CD/ Cassette (Columbia Records – 4748632)

No.	Title	Writer(s)	Album	Length
1.	"The Chosen Ones"	Joe Camilleri; Nick Smith	Hold On to Me	4:08
2.	"Come On, Come On"	Camilleri; Laurie Polec	Better Times	4:35
3.	"Brown Eyed Girl"	Van Morrison	Sonola	3:31
4.	"Hold On to Me"	Camilleri; Smith	Hold On to Me	3:52
5.	"Never Let Me Go"	Camelleri; Smith	Harley and Rose	4:05
6.	"Ain't Love the Strangest Thing"	Cameller; Polec	Better Times	5:50
7.	"The Crack-Up"	Camelleri; Smith	Hold On to Me	3:25
8.	"Chained to the Wheel"	Camelleri; Smith	Hold On to Me	3:59
9.	"Daughters Of Glory"	Camelleri; Smith	Dear Children	4:09
10.	"Hold It Up To The Mirror"	Camelleri; Smith	Harley and Rose	5:45
11.	"Better Times"	Cameller; Polec	Better Times	4:56
12.	"Harley + Rose"	Camelleri; Smith	Harley and Rose	3:55
13.	"Baby It's a Crime"	Camelleri; Smith	Harley and Rose	3:58
14.	"Stir It Up"	Bob Marley	new recording	3:36
15.	"Mystified"	Camelleri; Smith	Dear Children	4:33
16.	"Sons of the Sea"	Camelleri; Smith	A Place in the World	3:52

== Charts ==
=== Weekly charts ===
Chart (1993–94)	Peak position
Australian Albums (ARIA)	4
New Zealand Albums (RMNZ)	23

=== Year-end charts ===
Chart (1993)	Position
Australian Albums (ARIA)	41

Chart (1994)	Position
Australian Albums (ARIA)	50
Australian Artist Albums (ARIA)	9

== Certifications ==
Region	Certification	Certified units/sales
Australia (ARIA)	Platinum	70,000^{^}
^{^} Shipments figures based on certification alone.

== Release history ==
Region	Date	Format	Label	Catalogue
Australia	1 November 1993	CD, Cassette	Columbia Records	4748632
Australia	26 August 2016	CD	Sony Music Australia	88985368072
