= Roarin' Town =

Studio album by The Black Sorrows
- Released: 4 October 2006
- Recorded: Woodstock Studios, Melbourne
- Genres: Country rock; pop rock
- Length: 57:00
- Label: ABC Records
- Producer: Joe Camilleri

The Black Sorrows chronology
One Mo' Time (2004)	Roarin' Town (2006)	The Essential Black Sorrows (2007)

Roarin' Town is the eleventh studio album by Australian rock band The Black Sorrows. The album was released in October 2006. It was the first studio album from The Black Sorrows since Beat Club in 1998. Camilleri said he wrote the tracks throughout 2005 and called the song "What Levi Wants", the son of "Harley + Rose", "not because they sound like each other, it just started to speak in the same way."

The album was re-released in May 2007, with a 7-track live CD.

== Reception ==
Bruce Elder from Sydney Morning Herald said; "This is the first new Black Sorrows album in nearly a decade and it doesn't do the brand name any favours." adding "There are moments when the old magic re-emerges... But the rest of the material fails to excite"

== Track listing ==
(all tracks written by Joe Camelleri and Nick Smith)

1. "Lonesome Road" - 5:04
2. "What Levi Wants" - 4:26
3. "It Ain't True" - 3:51
4. "Where's It All Gonna End" - 3:00
5. "Headful of Stars" - 4:14
6. "In Your Lover's Arms Tonight" - 4:43
7. "Restless Heart" - 5:10
8. "Word to the Wise" - 3:40
9. "Comfort Me" - 4:07
10. "Lay By My Side" - 4:09
11. "The Richest Man in the World" - 4:24
12. "Best Thing" - 2:52
13. "That Tune on the Jukebox" - 3:55

2007 Bonus disc

1. "Harley + Rose" (Live)
2. "Daughters Of Glory" (Live)
3. "Chained to the Wheel" (Live)
4. "Snake Skin Shoes" (Live)
5. "Mystified" (Live)
6. "Last One Standing For You" (Live)
7. "Hold On to Me" (Live)

== Personnel ==
The Black Sorrows:

- Joe Camilleri - vocals, saxophone, guitar
- James Black - keyboards (piano, Hammond organ) (does not appear on tracks 1, 5, 6, 10, 12)
- Claude Carranza - guitar (does not appear on tracks 6, 8)
- Stephen Hadley - bass guitar
- Tony Floyd - drums

with:

- Stuart Fraser - guitars (all tracks except 12)
- Shannon Bourne - guitars (1, 6, 9, 10)
- Nick Smith - backing vocals (1, 2, 4, 8)
- Steve Bussutil - violin (2, 4)
- Nigel MacLean - violin (2, 4, 10)
- Lindsay Field - backing vocals (3, 7, 9, 11, 13)
- Annette Roche - backing vocals (3, 7, 9, 10)
- David Newick - horns (3, 5, 7, 8, 12)
- Wilbur Wilde - horns (3, 5, 7, 8, 12)
- Christina Katsimbardis - violin (7)
- Holly Piccoli - violin (7)
- Christian Read - viola (7)
- Nicholas Metcalfe - cello (7)

== Production team ==
- Produced by Joe Camilleri
- Engineered, mixed and mastered by Robin Mai
- Assistant engineers: Troy Trigwell, Andy Blythe, Chris Braun
- String arrangement on 7 by John McAll

== Release history ==
Region	Date	Format	Label	Catalogue
Australia	4 October 2006	CD, digital download	ABC Records	1778990
Australia	21 May 2007	CD	Warner Music Australia	1778607
