= The Adventures of The Amazing Revelators =

Studio album by The Revelators
- Released: March 2000
- Recorded: Woodstock Studios, 1999/2000
- Genre: Folk rock; Rock music; Rhythm & blues; Blues music
- Length: 1:00:21
- Label: Head Records / Shock Records
- Producer: Joe Camilleri

The Revelators chronology
| Amazing Stories (1991) | The Adventures of The Amazing Revelators (2000) | The Revelators (2002) |

The Adventures of The Amazing Revelators is the second studio album by Australian blues-rock band The Revelators. The album was recorded in four days and released in March 2000.

At the ARIA Music Awards of 2001, the album was nominated for Best Blues and Roots Album losing to More Gravy by Collard Greens & Gravy.

The album was released digitally on 28 April 2003.

== Background ==
In a Head Records press release, it The Revelators' new project started in Joe Camilleri's back shed while working on the next The Black Sorrows' album. Camilleri said; "Joe Creighton and James Black came over and I played them some songs I'd been working on and we decided to make another record. Joe had always wanted to do Van Morrison's "Beside You" and brought along a new song of his own called "Trust Me". Joined by Nicky Bomba on drums, we went to Woodstock Studios and cut 14 songs in 4 days." Months passed before Camilleri played the songs again, saying "Finally I pulled out the tapes, gave them a spin, rang James and said this stuff is pretty good but we got to do some more recording." In March 2000 the Revelators reunited at Woodstock to cut 6 more sides and finally the CD was completed.

== Track listing ==
CD track listing

| No. | Title | Writer(s) | Length |
|---|---|---|---|
| 1. | "Bulbs" | Van Morrison | 3:55 |
| 2. | "Unbreakable Chain" | Daniel Lanois | 5:08 |
| 3. | "Beside You" | Van Morrison | 4:59 |
| 4. | "Ride On" | Joe Camilleri; Nick Smith | 3:53 |
| 5. | "Mixed Up Shook Up Girl" | Willie De Ville | 3:27 |
| 6. | "Cypress Grove Blues" | James Bouchillon; Skip James | 5:56 |
| 7. | "Trust Me" | Joe Creighton | 4:04 |
| 8. | "True Love Travels on a Gravel Road" | A.L. "Doodle" Owens; Dallas Frazier | 3:43 |
| 9. | "Sin City" | Chris Hillman; Gram Parsons | 4:02 |
| 10. | "Raining in My Heart" | Boudleaux Bryant; Felice Bryant | 5:04 |
| 11. | "Turn Me On" | John D. Loudermilk | 3:07 |
| 12. | "Matador" | Garland Jeffreys | 4:56 |
| 13. | "If It's Really Got to be This Way" | Arthur Alexander; Donnie Fritts; Gary Nicholson | 3:47 |
| 14. | "Careless Love" | Lonnie Johnson | 4:20 |
| Total length: | | | 1:00:21 |

== Release history ==
| Region | Date | Format | Label | Catalogue |
|---|---|---|---|---|
| Australia | March 2000 | CD, Digital Download | Head Records / Shock Records | HEAD015 |
