= Certified Blue =

Studio album by The Black Sorrows
- Released: 4 April 2014
- Recorded: Woodstock Studios
- Genre: Rock; soul; blues; funk
- Label: Head Records
- Producer: Joe Camilleri, John McAll

The Black Sorrows chronology
Crooked Little Thoughts (2012)	Certified Blue (2014)	Endless Sleep Chapter 46 (2015)

Certified Blue is the fourteenth studio album by Australian rock band The Black Sorrows. The album was released in April 2014.

In an interview in October 2013, Camilleri said "I think it’s the best thing I’ve done in 25 years! But I always say exactly the same thing – I should have a tape just of me saying that! Nah, I think this record is a pretty special record. You just keep going – you’ve gotta keep going. People say to me, ‘why are you making another record? One came out 15 months ago!’ I say, ‘Because I have to!’ I’ve just gotta do it. That's what I do – the money I save on not smoking and not drinking, that's what I spend it on."

== Reception ==
Scott Podmore from The Herald Sun gave the album 4 out of 5 saying "Joe and gang are smokin’ in an hour's worth of songs that insist you move and keep coming back for more." Noel Mengel from The Courier Mail gave the album 4.5 out of 5 saying "[Certified Blue is]..an impeccably crafted trip through all the ingredients that made rock'n'roll in the first place, from gospel to sweet soul, raw blues to country...Blasting Certified Blue in the car, as I have been for a week, I didn't want it to end. It's that good." Paul Cashmere from Noise 11 said "Certified Blue... is a masterpiece. This is easily Joe's strongest album since Hold On to Me and most passionate since Dear Children." Brian Wise from Off The Record said "Certified Blue contains some of the best songs Joe and his long-term writing partner Nick Smith, have ever written...The album is a wonderful encapsulation of the talents of a great musician".

== Personnel ==
The Black Sorrows:

- Joe Camilleri – vocals, guitar, harp, percussion
- John McAll – keyboards, vocals, String and Horn arrangements
- Claude Carranza – guitar, vocals
- Mark Gray – bass, vocals
- Angus Burchall – drums

with:

- James Mustafa - trumpet
- Travis Woods - trumpet
- Julien Wilson - tenor saxophone
- Ben Gillespie - trombone
- Tim Wilson - alto saxophone, flute
- Greg Clarkson - baritone saxophone

== Track listing ==
CD/DD

1. "Roarin' Town" - 3:17
2. "Certified Blue" - 4:02
3. "Can't Give Up On You" - 3:35
4. "Wake Me Up in Paradise" - 4:38
5. "Save Me" - 3:51
6. "Return of the Voodoo Sheiks" - 3:53
7. "Righteous Blues" - 2:15
8. "Lovers Waltz" - 4:48
9. "Man of Straw" - 4:18
10. "The Devil Came Knocking on Sunday" - 3:37
11. "The Big Heartache" - 5:32
12. "Until I Make You Mine" - 4:48
13. "Dear Lord" - 3:55
14. "Call Me a Fool" - 4:58
15. "Gates of Hell" - 4:08

Vinyl

- A1 "Roarin' Town" - 3:17
- A2 "Certified Blue" - 4:00
- A3 "Can't Give Up On You" - 3:33
- A4 "Wake Me Up In Paradise" - 4:38
- A5 "Save Me" - 3:51
- B1 "Return of the Voodoo Sheiks" - 3:53
- B2 "Righteous Blues" - 2:16
- B3 "Lovers Waltz" - 4:48
- B4 "Man of Straw" - 4:16
- B5 "The Devil Came Knockin' on Sunday" - 3:38

== Charts ==
=== Weekly charts ===
Chart (2014)	Peak position
Australia (ARIA Chart)	73
Australia (ARIA Jazz and Blues Chart)	2

=== Year-end charts ===
Chart (2014)	Rank
Australia (ARIA) Jazz and Blues Chart	5
Chart (2015)	Rank
Australia (ARIA) Jazz and Blues Chart	49

== Release history ==
Region	Date	Format	Label	Catalogue
Australia	4 April 2014	Digital download, Vinyl, Compact Disc	Head Record	HEAD193
