= APRA Music Awards of 1991 =

Annual Australian music awards

- Date: 1991
- Location: Australia
- Website: apra-amcos.com.au

The Australasian Performing Right Association Awards of 1991 (generally known as APRA Awards) are a series of awards held in 1991. The APRA Music Awards were presented by Australasian Performing Right Association (APRA) and the Australasian Mechanical Copyright Owners Society (AMCOS). Two new categories were added, Songwriter of the Year and Ted Albert Memorial Award – the latter honours Ted Albert (1937–1990), an Australian early pioneer independent record producer and founder of Albert Productions.

== Awards ==
Only winners are noted

Award	Winner
Songwriter of the Year	Phil Buckle
Ted Albert Memorial Award	Allan Hely
Song of the Year	"Treaty" (Paul Kelly, Mandawuy Yunupingu, Stuart Kellaway, Cal Williams, Gurrumul Yunupingu, Milkayngu Mununggurr) by Yothu Yindi
Country Song of the Year	"Harley + Rose" (Joe Camilleri, Nicholas Smith) by The Black Sorrows
Contemporary Classical Composition of the Year	Towards the Shining Light (Brenton Broadstock) by Brenton Broadstock
Jazz Composition of the Year	"And Zen Monk" (Roger Frampton) by Roger Frampton
Most Performed Foreign Work	"I'll Be Your Baby Tonight" (Bob Dylan) by UB40
Most Performed Australian Work	"Heart in Danger" (Phil Buckle) by Southern Sons
Most Performed Australian Work Overseas	"Suicide Blonde" (Andrew Farriss, Michael Hutchence) by INXS
Film Score of the Year	Death in Brunswick (Phil Judd) by Phil Judd
Television or Film Theme of the Year	Chances (Peter George Sullivan) by Peter Sullivan

== See also ==
- Music of Australia
