= The Revelators (album) =

Studio album by The Revelators
- Released: 23 September 2002
- Recorded: Woodstock Studios, 2002
- Genre: Folk rock; Rock music; Rhythm & blues; Blues music
- Label: Head Records / Shock Records
- Producer: Joe Camilleri

The Revelators chronology
The Adventures of The Amazing Revelators (2000)	The Revelators (2002)	The Best Of... The Revelators (2012)

The Revelators is the third and final studio album by Australian blues-rock band The Revelators. The album was released 23 September 2002. The band considers this 'their true debut'. Camilleri said "This is the evolution of being a band. It's about trying to create a standard of music that's as good as the music we love." Unlike the band's previous albums, this album contains mostly original tracks. Joe Camilleri said; “We wrote a whole bunch of songs for the record, but some didn't make the cut. It's always a tricky thing, you think they're all beautiful. Some songs are really good but they don't fit the record.” The album was officially launched on 4 October 2002 at Melbourne's Corner Hotel.

At the ARIA Music Awards of 2003, the album was nominated for Best Blues and Roots Album losing to Up All Night by The Waifs.

== Track listing ==
CD track listing

1. "That's What I'd Give (For Your Love)"
2. "Heart Like a Wheel" (Anna McGarrigle)
3. "Here We Go Again"
4. "The Bottle and its Slave"
5. "Floating Bridge"
6. "Key to the Heart" (Doug Sahm)
7. "When the Spell is Broken"
8. "One Mo' Time" (Eddie Hinton)
9. "Must've Seen a Raven"
10. "Missing You"
11. "Hell to Pay"
12. "Honey Bee"
13. "Ruler of My Heart" (Allen Toussaint)

== Release history ==
Region	Date	Format	Label	Catalogue
Australia	23 September 2002	CD, Digital Download	Head Records / Shock Records	HEAD031
