= One Mo' Time (album) =

Studio album by The Black Sorrows
- Released: 16 August 2004
- Recorded: 2004
- Genre: Acoustic music; rock
- Length: 59:00
- Label: Liberation

The Black Sorrows chronology
Beat Club (1998)	One Mo' Time (2004)	Roarin' Town (2006)

One Mo' Time is the tenth studio album by Australian rock band The Black Sorrows. The album was released in August 2004 and The Black Sorrows re-recording some of their classic material in an acoustic setting.

Upon release, lead singer Joe Camilleri said; "You take the job on for various reasons. Sometimes it's the money. Sometimes you got nothing to do. Other times it's the challenge. It's a hardcore thing, to go back to some songs that, whether you've done them justice or not, are part of Australian history. It's a brave thing to do."

== Reception ==
Inpress magazine said the album is "A hand-tooled model of a national treasure".

== Track listing ==
CD track listing (BLUE0702 )

1. "Harley + Rose" (Joe Camilleri, Nick Smith) - 3:47
2. "The Chosen Ones" (Camilleri, Smith) - 5:28
3. "Dear Children" (Camilleri, Smith) - 4:17
4. "Daughters of Glory" (Camilleri, Smith) - 3:25
5. "Ain't Love the Strangest Thing" (Camilleri, Laurie Polec) - 5:15
6. "Snake Skin Shoes" (Camilleri, Jeff Griffin) - 3:41
7. "Brown Eyed Girl" (Van Morrison) - 3:41
8. "That's What I'd Give For Your Love" (Camilleri, Smith) - 4:16
9. "Hold On to Me" (Camilleri, Smith) - 4:43
10. "Mystified" (Camilleri, Smith) - 4:11
11. "Lucky Charm" (Camilleri, Smith) - 4:46
12. "Country Girls" (Camilleri, Smith) - 3:29
13. "Better Times" (Camilleri, Polec) - 5:06
14. "Come On, Come On" (Camilleri, Polec) - 3:06

== Personnel ==
The Black Sorrows:

- Joe Camilleri - vocals, saxophone, guitar, harp, keyboards
- James Black - keyboards, guitar
- Jeff Burstin - guitar, mandolin
- Stephen Hadley - bass guitar
- Tony Floyd - drums, percussion

with:

- Ed Bates - slide and pedal steel guitars (1, 3, 4, 6, 9, 11, 12)
- Joe Creighton - backing vocals (2, 5, 6, 7, 8, 10 12, 13, 14)
- Nick Smith - backing vocals (3, 4, 9, 11)
- John Barrett - saxophone (8, 9)

== Production team ==
- Produced by Joe Camilleri
- Recorded by Adam Rhodes, assisted by Troy Trigwell
- Mixed and mastered by Robin Mai and Joe Camilleri

== Charts ==
One Mo' Time entered the ARIA Jazz and Blues chart at number 19 for the week commencing 18 October 2004. It peaked at number 14, for the week commencing 24 November 2004.

Chart (2004)	Peak position
Australian (ARIA) Jazz and Blues Chart	14

== Tour ==
The Black Sorrows celebrated the release of the album with a national tour across November 2004.

- 2 Nov - Subiaco Race Track, Perth, WA
- 5 Nov - Pemberton Community Centre, Perth, WA
- 11 Nov - Kedron-Wavell Services Club, Kedron, QLD
- 12 Nov - Southport RSL, Southport, QLD
- 13 Nov - Mooloolaba Surf Club, Mooloolaba, QLD
- 14 Nov - Carindale Tavern, Carindale, QLD
- 24 Nov - The Famous Spiegeltent, Melbourne, VIC

The Black Sorrows also performed an acoustic set of their tracks at A Day On The Green throughout November and December 2004.
