= Endless Sleep Chapter 46 =

Album by The Black Sorrows

Studio album by The Black Sorrows
- Released: 17 April 2015
- Recorded: Woodstock Studios & Black Pearl Studios, Melbourne, Australia
- Genres: Blues rock; soul
- Label: Head Records
- Producers: Joe Camilleri, John McAll

The Black Sorrows chronology
Certified Blue (2014)	Endless Sleep Chapter 46 (2015)	Endless Sleep Chapter 47 (2015)

Endless Sleep Chapter 46 is the fifteenth studio album Australian blues rock band, The Black Sorrows. The album was the first of two simultaneously-released limited edition vinyl in Australia in April 2015. It was later released as a digital download and compact disc in Europe.

The band supported the European release with a 16-date tour of the UK and Scandinavia in August 2016, including six performances at Edinburgh Fringe Festival.

At the ARIA Music Awards of 2015, Endless Sleep was nominated for Best Blues and Roots Album, losing to Gon' Boogaloo by C. W. Stoneking.

At the Australian Blues Music Festival, The Black Sorrows was nominated for Duo or Group of the year for theirs song "Devil in Disguise". It lost out to Greg Dodd & the Hoodoo Men's "I Wish You Would."

== Background ==
Following on from the success of their album Certified Blue in 2014, The Black Sorrows simultaneously released two limited edition 12" vinyl LPs in time for Record Store Day on 18 April 2015. The LPs are a tribute to the lyricists. Joe Camilleri said; "I tip my hat to the spirit of these artists who have inspired me and give the songs another opportunity to be heard...I'm a disciple and it's a bit of soul food."

The title Endless Sleep refers to the fact that the original artists of the songs are no longer alive while the 'chapter 46' refers to the number of albums lead singer Joe Camilleri has released over his career, dating back to the 1960s and including Jo Jo Zep & The Falcons, The Revelators, his solo works and The Black Sorrows.

== Reception ==
Professional ratings
Review scores
Source	Rating
The Australian	4/5 stars
The Music	3/5 stars
The Sydney Morning Herald	3.5/5 stars

Michael Dwyer from The Sydney Morning Herald gave the album 3 ½ out of 5, saying "The hell-for-leather boogie of J.J. Cale's 'Devil In Disguise' and Vika Bull's paint stripping tilt at Big Maybelle's 'That's A Pretty Good Love' balance the sardonic storytelling of Lou Reed's 'Dirty Boulevard' and Warren Zevon's 'Excitable Boy.'"

Dylan Stewart from The Music gave the album 3 out of 5 saying "there's a lot of fun to be had on Endless Sleep Chapter 46", calling "That's a Pretty Good Love" the highlight of the album.

Steve Creedy from The Australian gave the album 4 out of 5, saying: "As you might expect from somebody as accomplished and seasoned as Camilleri and his band, they are vividly executed and beautifully recorded. From the raw blues passion of “61 Highway” and “Done Something Wrong” to the exciting vocals of Vika Bull on “That’s Pretty Good Love” and the liquid slow boogie of Louis Jordan’s “Blue Light”, the [Black] Sorrows and guests generally nail it."

A reviewer from Daily Planet on ABC said the albums (referring to Chapters 46 and 47) are "full of beautifully judged covers of country, blues, soul, rock and jazz recordings that have continued to inspire him."

== Track listing ==
Vinyl (HEAD210V-46)

Side A
No.	Title	Writer(s)	Length
1.	"Devil in Disguise"	J. J. Cale	3:10
2.	"Dirty Boulevard"	Lou Reed	4:00
3.	"God Don't Like It"	Blind Willie McTell	2:36
4.	"Storybook Love"	Willy DeVille	3:52
5.	"Better Times Ahead"	Gil Scott-Heron	4:19

Side B
No.	Title	Writer(s)	Length
1.	"That's a Pretty Good Love" (featuring Vika Bull)	Bryant Lucas, Fred Mendelsohn	2:41
2.	"Excitable Boy"	Warren Zevon, LeRoy Marinell	2:49
3.	"Jealous Kind"	Bobby Charles	4:14
4.	"Lonnie's Lament"	John Coltrane	5:44
5.	"Too Much Time"	Captain Beefheart	2:42

== Personnel ==
The Black Sorrows:

- Joe Camilleri – vocals, guitar, saxophone, harp
- John McAll – keyboards, vocals
- Claude Carranza – guitar, vocals
- Mark Gray – bass, vocals
- Angus Burchall – drums

with:

- Ed Bates - steel guitar
- Vika Bull - lead vocals on "That's A Pretty Good Love"
- Jeff Burstin - guitars
- Paul Williamson - sax

and Eric Budd, Paddy McMullin, Matt Amy, Nui Moon, Phillip Rex, Johnny Salerno, Danny Spencer

== Release history ==
Region	Date	Format	Label	Catalogue
Australia	17 April 2015	Vinyl	Head Record	HEAD210V-46
Europe	29 April 2015	digital download, CD	Rootsy	WMS-7350050-361198
