= Endless Sleep Chapter 47 =

Studio album by The Black Sorrows
- Released: 17 April 2015
- Recorded: Woodstock Studios & Black Pearl Studios, Melbourne, Australia
- Genre: Blues rock; soul
- Label: Head Records
- Producer: Joe Camilleri, John McAll

The Black Sorrows chronology
Endless Sleep Chapter 46 (2015)	Endless Sleep Chapter 47 (2015)	Faithful Satellite (2016)

Endless Sleep Chapter 47 is the sixteenth studio album Australian blues rock band, The Black Sorrows. The album was the second of two simultaneously-released limited edition vinyl in Australia in April 2015. It was later released on digital download and compact disc in Europe.

The band supported the European release with a 16-date tour of the UK and Scandinavia in August 2016, including 6 performances at Edinburgh Fringe Festival.

At the ARIA Music Awards of 2015, Endless Sleep was nominated for ARIA Award for Best Blues and Roots Album, losing to Gon' Boogaloo by C. W. Stoneking.

== Background ==
Following on from the success of their album Certified Blue in 2014, The Black Sorrows simultaneously released two limited edition 12" vinyl LPs in time for Record Store Day on 18 April 2015. The LPs are a tribute to the lyricists. Joe Camilleri said; "I tip my hat to the spirit of these artists who have inspired me and give the songs another opportunity to be heard...I’m a disciple and it's a bit of soul food."

The title Endless Sleep refers to the fact that the original artists of the songs are no longer alive. Camelleri said "As the original artists are no longer living, Endless Sleep, Track 1 of Chapter 47, by fifties rockabilly artist Jody Reynolds, seemed the perfect title." The 'Chapter 47' refers to the number of albums lead singer Joe Camilleri has released over his career, dating back to the 1960s and including Jo Jo Zep & The Falcons, The Revelators, his solo works and The Black Sorrows.

== Reception ==
Professional ratings
Review scores
Source	Rating
The Music	3.5/5 stars

Dylan Stewart from The Music gave the album 3.5 out of 5, saying: "There's a moment on Endless Sleep Chapter 47 during the Black Sorrows' cover of Hank Williams' 'I'm So Lonesome I Could Cry' when it seems as though Williams had written the tune especially for Joe Camilleri, some 66 years after the fact." Stewart added: "Of course, there are plenty more upbeat covers here, and it's this contrast across the record that most appeals. Clearly a passion project, Chapter 47 is a bucket of fun and memories, wrapped in that vintage Black Sorrows sound."

A reviewer from Daily Planet on ABC said the albums (referring to Chapters 46 and 47) are "full of beautifully judged covers of country, blues, soul, rock and jazz recordings that have continued to inspire him."

== Track listing ==
Vinyl (HEAD210V-47)

Side A
No.	Title	Writer(s)	Length
1.	"Endless Sleep"	Jody Reynolds	2:50
2.	"I'm So Lonesome I Could Cry"	Hank Williams	3:37
3.	"Hard Time Killing Floor"	Nehemiah Curtis James	4:08
4.	"61 Highway"	Fred McDowell	3:45
5.	"Done Somebody Wrong"	Elmore James	2:50

Side B
No.	Title	Writer(s)	Length
1.	"No Such Pain As Love"	Willy DeVille	3:52
2.	"Come Back Baby"	Walter Davis	2:59
3.	"Baby Let Me Kiss You"	King Floyd	2:45
4.	"Blue Light"	Louis Jordan, Jessie Mae Robinson	4:04
5.	"Wallflower"	Bob Dylan	2:52

== Personnel ==
The Black Sorrows:

- Joe Camilleri – vocals, guitar, saxophone, harp
- John McAll – keyboards, vocals
- Claude Carranza – guitar, vocals
- Mark Gray – bass, vocals
- Angus Burchall – drums

with:

- Ed Bates - steel guitar
- Jeff Burstin - guitars
- Paul Williamson - sax

and Eric Budd, Paddy McMullin, Matt Amy, Nui Moon, Phillip Rex, Johnny Salerno, Danny Spencer

== Release history ==
Region	Date	Format	Label	Catalogue
Australia	17 April 2015	Vinyl	Head Record	HEAD210V-46
Europe	29 April 2015	digital download, CD	Rootsy	WMS-7350050-361198
