= Crooked Little Thoughts =

Studio album by The Black Sorrows
- Released: 24 February 2012
- Recorded: Woodstock Studios, Platinum Studios, Melbourne
- Genre: Blues; funk; soul
- Length: 94:12
- Label: Head Records
- Producer: Joe Camilleri

The Black Sorrows chronology
4 Days in Sing Sing (2009)	Crooked Little Thoughts (2012)	Certified Blue (2014)

Crooked Little Thoughts is the thirteenth studio album by Australian rock band The Black Sorrows. The album was released as a 3CD + 72 page book package in February 2012. All tracks were written by Joe Camilleri and Nick Smith and each track is accompanied by a painting by Australian artist Victor Rubin.

== Reception ==
Michael Dywer from The West Australian said; "Crooked Little Thoughts demands engagement of the sitting down, listening and touching kind. Each disc is a digestible eight songs long, each a fresh take on Camilleri's panoramic appreciation of the soul of American music from zydeco to pop, with a cosy throng of ace muso comrades. With highlights as varied as Atlanta Coogan's roaring gospel vocal on "Lovin' You", the spooky New Orleans curb crawl of "Only Time Will Tell", the sleazy Miami disco of "Money Talkin'", the dustbowl waltz of "Salvation Song" and the Quintet du Hot Club swing of "The End of Time", these thoughts run deep enough for a long shelf life."

== Track listing ==
CD1

1. "Money Talkin'" - 4:36
2. "Our Town" - 4:09
3. "Shelley" - 3:52
4. "Lovin' You" - 3:18
5. "Waitin' for the Hammer" - 3:22
6. "Salvation Song" - 3:18
7. "Lost in Wonder" - 4:21
8. "Somewhere in this World" - 3:57

CD2

1. "Lover's Story" - 4:00
2. "I'm the One" - 4:00
3. "Perfect Ending" - 4:26
4. "Nothin' Lasts Forever" - 4:19
5. "A Fool and the Moon" - 3:54
6. "How Could I Have Been So Wrong?" - 4:55
7. "The Romantic Death of Me" - 3:33
8. "The End of Time" - 3:44

CD3

1. "The Stars in the Sky" - 2:59
2. "Only Time Will Tell" - 3:46
3. "Long Cold Night" - 3:41
4. "The Spell is Broken" - 4:55
5. "Life's Sad Parade" - 3:29
6. "Until the Day I Die" - 3:10
7. "It's Only Xmas" - 4:33
8. "Dustbowl Blues" - 2:59

== Release history ==
Region	Date	Format	Label	Catalogue
Australia	24 February 2012	CD+Book / Digital download	Head Record	HEAD150
