= Faithful Satellite =

Studio album by The Black Sorrows
- Released: 16 September 2016
- Recorded: 2015−2016
- Studio: Woodstock Studios, Melbourne
- Genre: Blues; Rock; Soul
- Label: Head Records
- Producer: Joe Camilleri, John McAll

The Black Sorrows chronology
Endless Sleep Chapter 47 (2015)	Faithful Satellite (2016)	Citizen John (2019)

Singles from Citizen John
- 1. "Fix My Bail" Released: September 2016; 2. "It Ain't Ever Gonna Happen" Released: November 2016; 3. "Raise Your Hands" Released: February 2017

Faithful Satellite is the seventeenth studio album by Australian blues rock band, The Black Sorrows. The album was initially released on CD and digital download on September 16, 2016; followed by a limited-edition double vinyl followed on September 30, 2016. The vinyl included eight tracks exclusively.

== Reception ==
In a review for Stack Magazine, Jeff Jenkins wrote "Faithful Satellite traverses bluegrass, blues, rockabilly, reggae, rock, gospel, and soul. 'Camilleri' is known for the vitality in his lyrics".

Paul Cashmere, reviewing the album for Noise11, stated that the album is a 'masterpiece', adding that "The Faithful Satellite's beauty is in its diversity with rock, jazz, bluegrass, and country woven through the release. This often reminds long-time Camilleri fans of the various eras of Black Sorrows music across the last 30 years."

== Track listing ==
Side A
No.	Title	Writer(s)	Length
1.	"Cold Grey Moon"	Joe Camilleri, Nick Smith	5:28
2.	"Raise Your Hands"	Camilleri, Smith	3:13
3.	"You Were Never Mine"	Camilleri, Smith	4:45
4.	"Fix My Bail"	Camilleri, Smith	3:50
5.	"Until the Rain Begins to Fall"	Camilleri, Smith

Side B
No.	Title	Writer(s)	Length
1.	"It Ain't Ever Gonna Happen"	Camilleri, Smith	4:01
2.	"I Love You Anyhow"	Camilleri, Smith	3:29
3.	"Winter Rose"	Camilleri, Smith	4:29
4.	"How Could You Leave Me"	Camilleri, Smith
5.	"Into Twilight"	Camilleri, Smith	3:41

Side C
No.	Title	Writer(s)	Length
1.	"Caroline"	Camilleri, Smith	3:50
2.	"Love is on its Way"	Camilleri, Smith	5:33
3.	"Land of the Dead"	Camilleri, Smith	3:30
4.	"Beat Nightmare"	Camilleri, Smith	4:36
5.	"Diamonds and Furs"	Camilleri, Smith

Side D
No.	Title	Writer(s)	Length
1.	"Redemption Blues"	Camilleri, Smith
2.	"Out of Your Mind"	Camilleri, Smith
3.	"Separation Blues"	Camilleri, Smith
4.	"It's Your Fault (I Can't Get Back to Sleep)"	Camilleri, Smith
5.	"Nobody's Fool"	Camilleri, Smith

Digital download

1. "I Love You Anyhow"
2. "Raise Your Hands"
3. "It Ain't Ever Gonna Happen"
4. "Land of the Dead"
5. "Cold Grey Moon"
6. "Fix My Bail"
7. "Carolina"
8. "You Were Never Mine"
9. "Winter Rose"
10. "Love Is On Its Way"
11. "Beat Nightmare"
12. "Into Twilight"

== Charts ==
Chart (2016)	Peak position
Australia (ARIA Jazz and Blues Chart)	2

== Faithful Satellite Tour ==
The group toured the album across Australia throughout the second half of 2016.

- 29 July – The Flying Saucer Club, Victoria
- 30 July – Bundy Hall, Victoria
- 31 July – Bundy Hall, Victoria
- 20 August – The Satellite Lounge, Victoria
- 1 September – Southport Yacht Club, Queensland
- 2 September – "Red Fest" Brisbane, Queensland
- 3 September – Towers Rocks, Queensland
- 4 September – Sunshine Beach Surf Club, Queensland
- 10 September – Sandstone Point Hotel, Queensland
- 16 September – SS&A Club, Albury, NSW
- 17 September – The Palms at Crown, Melbourne, Victoria
  (with special guests Vika and Linda Bull)
- 22 September – Mt Pleasant Tavern, Queensland
- 23 September – Dalrymple Hotel, Townsville, Queensland
- 24 September – Edge Hill Tavern, Cairns, Queensland
- 29 September – Devonport Entertainment & Convention Centre, Tasmania
- 30 September – Country Club Showroom, Tasmania
- 1 October – Centre Square, Birrarung Marr, Victoria
- 7 October – Twin Towns Services Club, NSW
- 9 October – Barwon Club Hotel, Victoria
- 12 October – Frankston RSL, Victoria
- 13 October – Friends Restaurant, Perth, WA
- 14 October – Fly by Night Club, Fremantle, WA
- 15 October – Charles Hotel, WA
- 16 October – Ravenswood Hotel, WA
- 21 October – Wild Goose Restaurant, WA
- 22 October – Shark Bay 1616, WA
- 29 October – Cygnet Town Hall, Tasmania
- 30 October – Republic Bar, Hobart, Tasmania
- 3 November – The Basement, Sydney, NSW
- 4 November – Inland Sea of Sound Festival, Bathurst, NSW
- 5 November – Armidale Ex-Services Club, NSW
- 6 November – Hoey Moey Beer Garden, Coffs Harbour, NSW
- 8 November – Bird's Basement, Melbourne, Victoria
- 9 November – Bird's Basement, Melbourne, Victoria
- 11 November – Caboolture Sports Club, Queensland
- 12 November – Stanthorpe Rocks, Queensland
- 13 November – Caloundra Power Boat Club, Queensland
- 18 November – Governor Hindmarsh Hotel, Adelaide, SA
- 19 November – River Rockfest, Broken Hill, NSW
- 26 November – River Rockfest, Mildura, Victoria
- 2 December – The Grand Hotel, Mornington, Victoria
- 3 December – Lakeside Twilights, Ballarat, Victoria
- 3 December – River Rockfest, Swan Hill, Victoria
- 4 December – Halls Gap Hotel, Victoria
- 7 December – Centro CBD, Wollongong, NSW
- 8 December – The Basement, Canberra, ACT
- 9 December – Lizotte's Newcastle, NSW
- 10 December – Lizotte's, Newcastle, NSW
- 11 December – Camelot Lounge, Marrickville, NSW
- 17 December – Skycity, Darwin, NT

== Personnel ==
The Black Sorrows

- Joe Camilleri (vocals/guitar/saxophone)
- Claude Carranza (guitar/vocals)
- Mark Gray (bass/vocals)
- John McAll (keyboards/vocals)
- Angus Burchall (drums)

== Release history ==
Region	Date	Format	Label	Catalogue
Australia	16 September 2016	Digital download, CD	Head Records	HEAD230
Australia	30 September 2016	Vinyl	Head Records	HEAD230V
