= Citizen John =

Studio album by the Black Sorrows
- Released: 29 March 2019
- Label: Bloodlines

The Black Sorrows chronology
| Faithful Satellite (2016) | Citizen John (2019) | Saint Georges Road (2021) |

Singles from Citizen John
- 1. "Silvio" Released: September 2018; 2. "Wednesday's Child" Released: 7 February 2019

Citizen John is the eighteenth studio album by Australian blues rock band, the Black Sorrows. The album was released on 29 March 2019. Upon announcement of the album, lead singer Joe Camilleri said "This is the album... is the hardest album I've ever made, on many levels", adding: "It's about moving forward. To me, it's always about moving forward. It's all very nice to get a pat on the back and 'Hey I saw you in '78,' but I want people to judge me on this album."

The album will be supported with an Australian tour from February to April, then Europe from April to May 2019.

== Track listing ==
=== Disc one ===
1. "Wednesday's Child" – 3:23
2. "Brother Moses Sister Mae" – 3:48
3. "Lazy Slide Guitar" – 4:06
4. "Way Below the Heavens" – 3:45
5. "Worlds Away" – 4:08
6. "Wild Times" – 4:05
7. "Messiah" – 3:47
8. "Storm the Bastille" – 4:18
9. "Play It Sentimental" – 2:53
10. "Citizen John" – 3:43
11. "Silvio" – 3:25
12. "Lover I Surrender" – 3:55

=== Disc two (live album) ===
1. "Wednesday's Child" – 3:36
2. "Do I Move You" – 4:52
3. "Silvio" – 3:32
4. "Lover I Surrender" – 4:56
5. "Way Below the Heavens" – 4:12
6. "Down Home Girl" – 5:28
7. "Brother Moses Sister Mae" – 4:23
8. "Citizen John" – 4:39
9. "The Honeydripper" – 4:53

== Charts ==
Citizen John debuted at number 11 on the ARIA Charts becoming the Black Sorrows' highest-charting album since Harley and Rose in 1990.

| Chart (2019) | Peak position |
|---|---|
| Australian Albums (ARIA) | 11 |

== Release history ==
| Region | Date | Format | Label | Catalogue |
|---|---|---|---|---|
| Australia | 29 March 2019 | Digital download, 2×CD | Bloodlines | BLOOD47X |
| Australia | 29 March 2019 | Limited edition vinyl | Bloodlines | BLOODLP47 |
