= Amazing Stories (album) =

Studio album by The Revelators
- Released: December 1991
- Recorded: 1991
- Genre: Folk rock; Rock music; Country music
- Length: 47:20 (2002 release)
- Label: Sony Music Australia/Head Records (Australia); Demon Records (United Kingdom)
- Producer: Joe Camilleri

The Revelators chronology
Amazing Stories (1991)	The Adventures of The Amazing Revelators (2000)

Alternative cover
- UK album cover

Amazing Stories is the debut studio album by Australian blues-rock band The Revelators. The album was released in 1991 and consisted of cover versions of soul and blues songs. The album was re-released in March 1993 as a 2CD pack with The Black Sorrows' Better Times and peaked at number 14 on the ARIA Chart. The album was re-released in 2002 with two additional tracks from the original sessions that were not included on the first pressing, Those being "Honest I Do" and "Tonight The Bottle Let Me Down"

Inside the booklet, Joe Camilleri of The Revelators said: "I don't see this as a greatest hits recording, more an opportunity to pay homage to some of the great writers of our time.The Revelators were formed out of a desire to keep music alive. Some of these songs have been with us for some time - others we were drawn to because of their charm... and every word is true."

== Track listing ==
CD track listing

No.	Title	Writer(s)	Length
1.	"What Does It Take To Win Your Love?"	Johnny Bristol; Harvey Fuqua; Vernon Bullock	3.50
2.	"Oh Darlin'"	Jamie O'Hara; Kieran Kane	2.27
3.	"Do Right Woman"	Chips Moman; Dan Penn	3.27
4.	"Caribbean Wind"	Bob Dylan	4.51
5.	"El Salvador"	Garland Jeffreys	4.21
6.	"Hot Burrito #1"	Gram Parsons; Chris Ethridge	3.41
7.	"Louisiana Blues"	Muddy Waters	4.36
8.	"I've Got to Find a Way to Win Maria Back"	Johnny Bristol	3.20
9.	"If I Could Be There"	Jamie O'Hara; Kieran Kane	4.37
10.	"Tupelo Honey"	Van Morrison	3.27
11.	"Walk That Line"	Jamie O'Hara; Kieran Kane	3.06

2002 Re-release

1. "El Salvador"
2. "Oh Darling"
3. "Do Right Woman"
4. "I've Got to Find a Way to Win Maria Back"
5. "Tupelo Honey"
6. "What Does It Take (To Win Your Love)?"
7. "Caribbean Wind"
8. "Honest I Do" (John Scofield) - 3:05
9. "Hot Burrito #1"
10. "If I Could Be There"
11. "Louisiana Blues"
12. "Tonight the Bottle Let Me Down" (Merle Haggard) - 3:27
13. "Walk That Line"

== Weekly charts ==
Upon re-release with The Black Sorrows' Better Times, the album debuted at number 41, before peaking at number 14 on the ARIA charts in May 1993.

Chart (1993)	Peak position
Australian Albums (ARIA)	14

== Personnel ==
The Revelators are:

- Joe Camilleri - vocal, saxophone, guitar
- James Black - keyboard, guitar
- Jeff Burstin - guitar, mandolin
- Joe Creighton - bass, backing vocals
- Peter Luscombe - drums, percussion

== Release history ==
Region	Date	Format	Label	Catalogue
Australia	December 1991	CD, Cassette	Sony Music Australia	4692552
Australia	March 1993	CD, Cassette	CBS Records	4721492
United Kingdom	1993	CD, Cassette	Demon Records	FIENDCD729
Worldwide	2002	CD, Digital Download	Head Records	HEAD026
