= 4 Days in Sing Sing =

Studio album by The Black Sorrows
- Released: 4 September 2009
- Recorded: 2009
- Studio: Sing Sing Studios, Melbourne
- Genre: Blues; funk; soul
- Label: Head Records
- Producer: Joe Camilleri, Peter Bain-Hogg

The Black Sorrows chronology
The Essential Black Sorrows (2007)	4 Days in Sing Sing (2009)	Crooked Little Thoughts (2012)

4 Days in Sing Sing is the twelfth studio album by Australian rock band The Black Sorrows. The album was recorded in four days in Sing Sing Studios in Melbourne, where the Black Sorrows recorded their albums Hold On to Me and Harley & Rose and released as a CD/DVD package in September 2009.

Lead singer Joe Camilleri said; "This all started because I was asked to document the past for a live DVD. I love and embrace my past, but I know and believe that The Black Sorrows will never be a heritage act because for us there’s no finish line. The heart and soul of The Sorrows still beats loud and clear." The plan was to recorded each track in no more than three takes to keep the music 'fresh' and 'not overwork it'. The DVD documents the recording of the album and includes interview footage of the band, sneak peaks behind the scenes and diary notes of the process by Camilleri.

== Track listing ==
CD track listing (HEAD109)

1. "Best Thing" - 3:27
2. "What Levi Wants" - 4:06
3. "Lonesome Road" - 4:52
4. "Lean On Me" - 3:57
5. "Don't Judge Me Too Hard" - 4:23
6. "Lay By My Side" - 4:00
7. "Comfort Me" - 3:15
8. "Every Natural Thing" -3:27
9. "Midnight Rain" - 4:49
10. "The Raven" - 4:17
11. "Sometimes I Wish" - 3:16
12. "Where's it All Gonna End" - 3:12
13. "Better Times" - 5:44
14. "Such a Night" - 5:24
15. "Little Murders" - 4:08
16. "Viva La Money" - 3:21
17. "Sumo" - 13:02

DVD track listing

1. "Don't Judge Me Too Hard"
2. "Comfort Me"
3. "Lean On Me"
4. "What Levi Wants"
5. "Lonesome Road"
6. "Lay By My Side"
7. "Such a Night"
8. "Sumo"
9. "Where's it All Gonna End"
10. "Every Natural Thing"
11. "The Raven"
12. "The Best Thing"
13. "Better Times"
14. "Don't Judge Me Too Hard" (Film Clip)
15. "Sometimes I Wish"
16. "Midnight Rain"
17. "Little Murders"
18. "Viva La Money"

== Personnel ==
Musicians:

- Joe Camilleri - vocals, saxophone, guitar, harmonica, melodica
- James Black - piano, Hammond organ, guitar
- Claude Carranza - guitar, vocals
- Joe Creighton - bass guitar, vocals
- Tony Floyd - drums, vocals
- Alejandro Vega - percussion
- Jordan Murray - trombone
- Dave Newdick - trumpet
- Tim Wilson - saxophone
