= Better Times (album) =

Studio album by The Black Sorrows
- Released: 18 September 1992
- Recorded: 1991−1992
- Studio: Metropolis Audio
- Genre: Rock music; folk rock; pop rock; country rock
- Label: CBS Records
- Producer: Joe Camilleri

The Black Sorrows chronology
Harley and Rose (1990)	Better Times (1992)	The Chosen Ones – Greatest Hits (1993)

Singles from Better Times
- 1. "Ain't Love the Strangest Thing" Released: July 1992; 2. "Better Times" Released: November 1992; 3. "Come On, Come On" Released: February 1993; 4. "Sweet Inspiration" Released: July 1993

Better Times is the seventh studio album by Australian rock band The Black Sorrows. The album was released in September 1992 and peaked at number 13 on the ARIA Albums Chart, becoming the band's third consecutive top-twenty album.

In March 1993, the album was re-released with The Revelators' Amazing Stories. Upon re-release, the album peaked at number 14 on the ARIA Albums Chart.

At the ARIA Music Awards of 1993, the album earned The Black Sorrows a nomination for Best Group, losing to "Weather with You" by Crowded House. Joe Camilleri was nominated for Producer of the Year for his work on this album, but lost to Simon Hussey. Pascoe & Gray Design and Eryk Photography were nominated for Best Cover Art for their work on Better Times, but lost to Paul McNeil and Richard All.

== Track listing ==
1. "Better Times" (Joe Camilleri, Laurie Polec)
2. "Come On, Come On" (Joe Camilleri, Laurie Polec)
3. "Ain't Love the Strangest Thing" (Joe Camilleri, Laurie Polec)
4. "A Night Like This" (Joe Camilleri, Laurie Polec)
5. "Too Long Gone" (Joe Camilleri, Laurie Polec)
6. "Stella" (Joe Camilleri, Laurie Polec)
7. "Steps of Time" (Joe Camilleri, Laurie Polec)
8. "Bitter Cup" (Joe Camilleri, Nick Smith)
9. "Sweet Inspiration" (Joe Camilleri, Laurie Polec)
10. "Storm Wind" (Joe Camilleri, Laurie Polec)
11. "Resurrection" (Joe Camilleri, Laurie Polec)

== Personnel ==
The Black Sorrows

- Joe Camilleri (billed throughout as Jo Camilleri) - lead and harmony vocals; sax (on 1, 8); guitars (on 3, 5, 11); harmonica (on 9); hammond organ (on 10)
- Jen Anderson - violin (on 4, 7 and 9)
- Michael Barker - percussion
- Linda Bull - vocals (lead vocal on "A Night Like This")
- Vika Bull - vocals (lead vocal on "Resurrection")
- Jeff Burstin - guitar
- James Black - keyboards (except on 4, 10)
- Steven Hadley - bass
- Peter Luscombe - drums

with:

- John Burnett - recorder on 6; flute on 7
- Robbie Burke - horn on 1
- Joe Creighton - additional vocals on 8, 9
- Venetta Fields - additional vocals on 1
- Ian Moss - lead guitar on 3
- Lucky Oceans - pedal steel on 4, 5
- Sam See - slide guitar on 2; lead guitar on 5, 10; lap steel on 10
- Paul Williamson - sax on 2

== Charts ==
Chart performance for Better Times
Chart (1992)	Peak position
Australian Albums (ARIA)	13
