= A Place in the World (The Black Sorrows album) =

Studio album by The Black Sorrows
- Released: 22 November 1985
- Recorded: 1985
- Studio: Qwiklik Studios
- Genre: Pop music; rock
- Label: Spirit Records
- Producer: Joey Vincent

The Black Sorrows chronology
| Rockin' Zydeco (1985) | A Place in the World (1985) | Dear Children (1987) |

Singles from A Place in the World
- 1. "Sons Of The Sea" Released: November 1985; 2. "Country Girls" Released: March 1986

A Place in the World is the third studio album by Australian rock band The Black Sorrows. The album was released in November 1985. All tracks were written by band members Joe Camilleri and Nick Smith, except "Let the Four Winds Blow".

== Review ==
The Canberra Times' Debbie Cameron noted the album was, "a cocktail of styles — from a strong piano accordion and calypso sound in "A Place in the World", to good dancing in "Country Girls", through a rocky but unremarkable "The Final Touch" and to a tragic "Sons of the Sea"". Although Cameron preferred Sonola, she found A Place in the World had "the action, the beat and the melody of Ry Cooder".

== Track listing ==
CD track listing

| No. | Title | Writer(s) | Length |
|---|---|---|---|
| 1. | "Country Girls" (remix) | Joe Camilleri; Nick Smith | 5:03 |
| 2. | "Have It Your Own Sweet Way" | Joe Camilleri; Nick Smith | 4:13 |
| 3. | "No Man's Land" | Joe Camilleri; Nick Smith | 4:21 |
| 4. | "Sons of the Sea" | Joe Camilleri; Nick Smith | 3:51 |
| 5. | "Sweet Way Out" | Joe Camilleri; Nick Smith | 1:05 |
| 6. | "Let the Four Winds Blow" | Dave Bartholomew; Fats Domino | 3:04 |
| 7. | "The Final Touch" | Joe Camilleri; Nick Smith | 3:20 |
| 8. | "A Place in the World" | Joe Camilleri; Nick Smith | 4:31 |
| 9. | "Black Ace" | Joe Camilleri; Nick Smith | 0:54 |
| 10. | "Gypsy Heart" | Joe Camilleri; Nick Smith | 5:02 |
| 11. | "Dance With Me" | Joe Camilleri; Nick Smith | 1:01 |
| 12. | "Country Girls" | Joe Camilleri; Nick Smith | 3:59 |

A Place in the World — Re-release edition (bonus live tracks [recorded 1985])
| No. | Title | Writer(s) | Length |
|---|---|---|---|
| 13. | "In The Night" (live) | Professor Longhair | 2:58 |
| 14. | "Corrina Corrina" (live) | Armenter "Bo Carter" Chatmon; Mitchell Parish; J. Mayo Williams | 2:53 |
| 15. | "Shape I'm In" (live) | Lee Cathy; Otis Blackwell | 2:30 |
| 16. | "Her Mind Is Gone" (live) | Professor Longhair | 2:41 |
| 17. | "I'm Just That Way" (live) | Bobby Charles | 3:37 |

== Personnel ==
The Black Sorrows:

- Joe Camilleri (as 'Joey Vincent') - vocals, saxophones
- Jeff Burstin – guitar
- George Butrumlis – accordion
- Joe Creighton – bass
- Peter Luscombe – drums, washboard
- Nick Smith – harmony vocals

with:

- Ed Bates – lap steel (1)
- Danny Bourke – violin (10)
- Ross Hannaford – guitar (1,9)
- Steve McTaggart – violin (1,2)
- Andrew Pendlebury – guitar (3)
- The Blackberries – harmony vocals (1,8)

- Engineer – Gary Constable
- Cover – Richard Lewis
- Illustration – Jenny Aitken
