= Beat Club (album) =

Studio album by The Black Sorrows
- Released: 5 November 1998
- Recorded: 1998
- Studio: Woodstock Studios, Melbourne
- Genre: Blues; rock; folk rock; funk
- Label: Mushroom
- Producer: Joe Camilleri, James Black, Kerryn Tolhurst

The Black Sorrows chronology
The Very Best of The Black Sorrows (1997)	Beat Club (1998)	One Mo' Time (2004)

Singles from Beat Club
- 1. "New Craze" Released: July 1998

Beat Club is the ninth studio album by Australian rock band The Black Sorrows. The album was released in November 1998. Australian music journalist Ian McFarlane described it as containing "R&B-tinged jazz and blues tunes"

At the ARIA Music Awards of 1999, Beat Club was nominated for Best Adult Contemporary Album, losing to Messenger by Jimmy Little.

In 1998, The Black Sorrows were Joe Camilleri, James Black, Tony Floyd, Stephen Hadley, Joe Creighton and Nick Haywood. They were joined on the album by numerous special guests: Renee Geyer, Sam Keevers, James Sherlock, Rick Formosa, Phil Burston, Stuart Fraser, Ian Chaplin, Ed Bates, Peter Luscombe, Kerryn Tolhurst, Robert Burke, Strings of the Victorian Philharmonic Orchestra, Anthony 'Tok' Norris, Paul Williamson, Nick Smith, Wayne Burt and Michael Barker.

== Critical reception ==
Professional ratings
Review scores
Source	Rating
The Sydney Morning Herald	8/10 stars

The Bulletin called the album "His best The Black Sorrows album in a decade!" Rip It Up in Adelaide said: "Beat Club is one of the great Black Sorrows records and also one of the best Australian releases this year". Rave from Brisbane said; "The best thing Joe has done in his long and distinguished career". Time Off Brisbane said: "Hats off to Joe Camilleri. Who would have thought that at this stage of The Black Sorrows' career Joe would have come up with an album to just about rival the definitive Hold On To Me. Beat Club is a triumph!"

== Track listing ==
CD track listing (MUSH33167.2)

No.	Title	Writer(s)	Length
1.	"New Craze"	Joe Camilleri; Nick Smith; James Black	4:44
2.	"Here She Comes"	Camilleri; Smith	4:16
3.	"Fool Notion"	Camilleri; Smith	5:27
4.	"98 Degrees"	Camilleri; Smith	3:27
5.	"Crazy 'bout the Way You Move"	Camilleri; Smith	4:41
6.	"Soul Free"	Camilleri; Smith	3:54
7.	"When You Say My Name"	Camilleri; Smith	5:05
8.	"Walkin' Like a Drownin' Man"	Camilleri; J. Griffin	3:46
9.	"Who Do You Think You're Foolin'?"	Don Van Vliet	3:13
10.	"Poor Boy Blues"	Camilleri; Smith	3:48
11.	"That's What I Get for Lovin' You"	Camilleri; Smith	4:04
12.	"Favourite Son"	Camilleri; Smith	3:57
13.	"You Can't Wear Another Man's Hat"	Iola Brubeck; Paul Desmond	4:16
