= The Black Sorrows =

Australian band

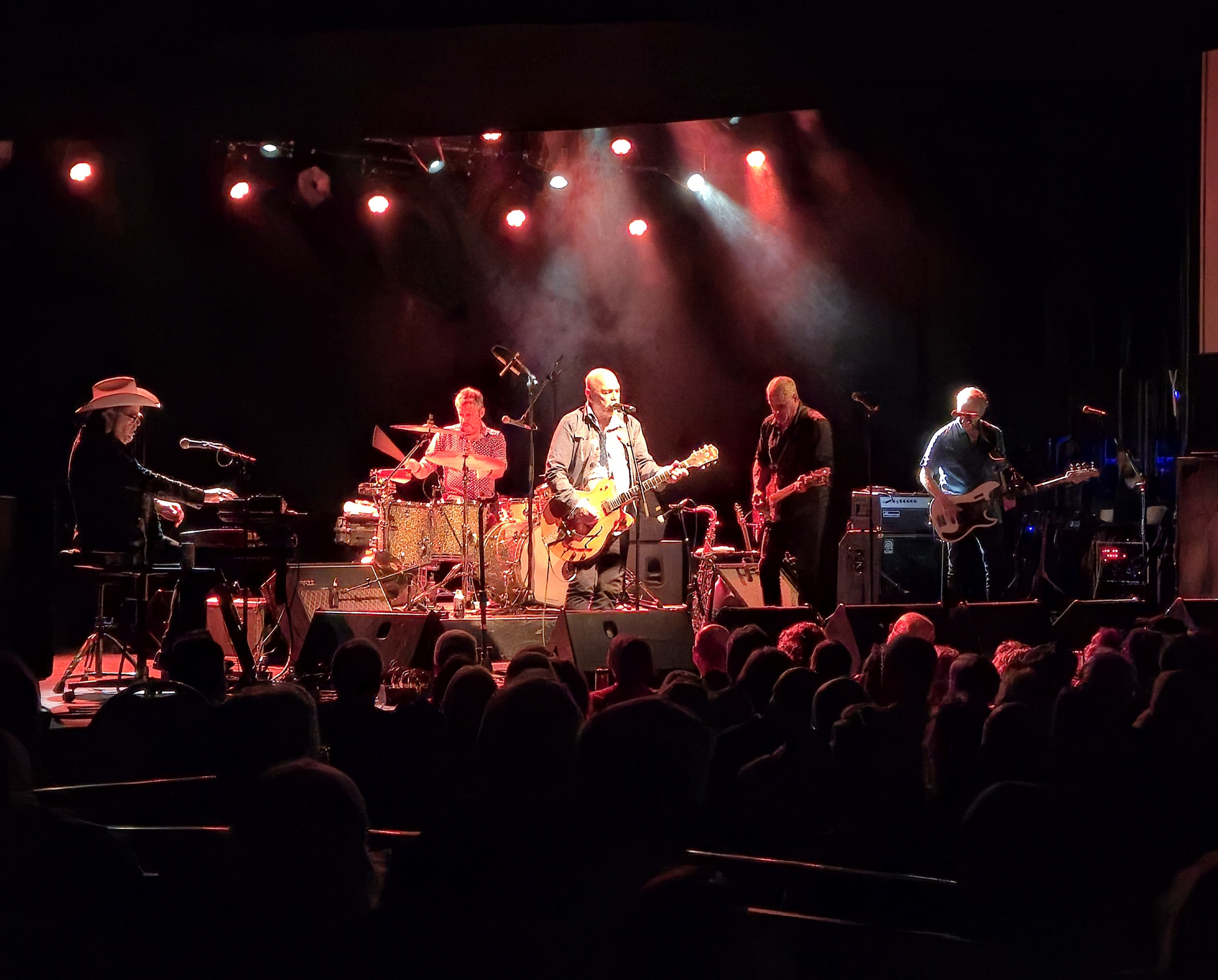
- The Black Sorrows at The Tivoli Brisbane December 2025

Background information
- Origin: Melbourne, Victoria, Australia
- Genres: Blues, rock, R&B, soul, zydeco
- Years active: 1983–present
- Labels: Spirit, Camel, CBS, Mushroom, Epic, Liberation Blue, Rajon, ABC/Warner
- Members: Joe Camilleri; James Black; Claude Carranza; Tony Floyd; Mark Gray
- Past members: see Members list below
- Website: theblacksorrows.com.au

The Black Sorrows are an Australian blues and roots band formed in Melbourne in 1983 by singer, songwriter and multi-instrumentalist Joe Camilleri. Initially a loose collective performing R&B, zydeco and soul covers, the group moved into original material and has released multiple studio albums across four decades, blending blues, rock, soul and roots influences. Over 40 musicians have played with the band, with Camilleri remaining the sole constant member throughout its history.

The band achieved commercial success in the late 1980s and early 1990s with top-charting albums such as Hold On to Me (1988), Harley and Rose (1990) and Better Times (1992), and singles including “Chained to the Wheel,” “Harley + Rose” and "Never Let Me Go". Several of these releases reached the top 20 on the Australian ARIA Albums Chart and the group won industry recognition during this period. Their extensive catalogue includes later albums such as Saint Georges Road (2021), The Way We Do Business (2024) and the retrospective The Quintessential Black Sorrows (2025).

Despite frequent lineup changes, The Black Sorrows have maintained a strong live following and continue to tour and record. The band's influence in Australian blues and roots music has endured, with its mix of styles and decades-long output contributing to its reputation as one of the country's long-running and eclectic musical acts.

== History ==
=== Formation and early years: 1983–85 ===
The Black Sorrows began as a loose pick-up band in Melbourne in 1983. They played mostly covers of R&B, zydeco, soul and blues music. An early line-up was founding mainstay, Joe Camilleri (aka Joey Vincent) on vocals, saxophone and guitar (ex-The Pelaco Brothers, Jo Jo Zep & The Falcons); with Jeff Burstin on guitar (ex-Company Caine, Jo Jo Zep & The Falcons), Wayne Burt on guitar and vocals (ex-Jo Jo Zep & The Falcons, the Fabulaires); George Butrumlis on piano accordion; Wayne Duncan on bass guitar (ex-Daddy Cool, Living Legends); Steve McTaggart on violin; Paul Williamson on clarinet and saxophone; and Gary Young on drums (ex-Daddy Cool, Jo Jo Zep & The Falcons).

Initially, Camilleri used the group to play gigs in local cafes after the dissolution of his previous band, Jo Jo Zep & The Falcons. From 1983 to 1988 he used the name Joey Vincent for his work with the band. Membership in the band has been loose and fluid. Most of The Falcons, at one point or another, have been members; numerous other Australian musicians have drifted in and out of the line-ups. Aside from zydeco, their early style included Cajun music.

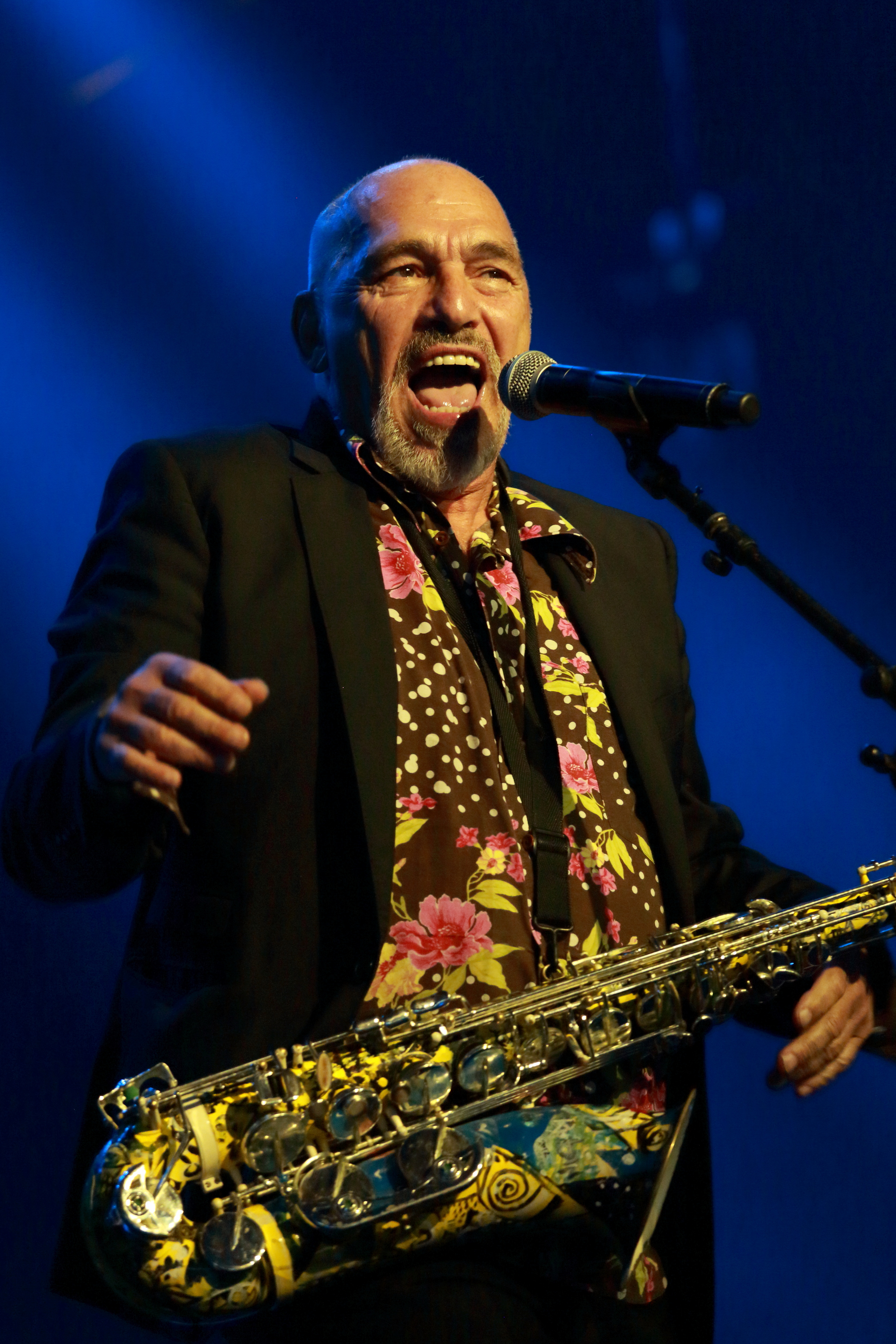
Joe Camilleri performs with the Black Sorrows at Byron Bay Bluesfest, April 2014.

Their first two albums, Sonola (June 1984) and Rockin' Zydeco (March 1985), were each recorded live-in-the-studio, in one day, with Camilleri producing. They consisted almost entirely of R&B covers of material from Chuck Berry, Fats Domino, Arthur Alexander, Don Covay, and John Lee Hooker.

A Place in the World followed in November 1985, again produced by Camilleri, it only had one cover track, the rest co-written by Camilleri with Nick Smith (ex-Millionaires, the Kevins, Stephen Cummings Band), who was also on guitar and backing vocals. Camilleri told Catherine Cook of The Canberra Times that they "had to exist on their own merit". She noted the songwriter was "taking all the best from the music he was playing and adding experiences and ideas". Also joining the group, just before recording, was Peter Luscombe (ex-Tinsley Waterhouse Band, Stephen Cummings Band) on drums and percussion. Camilleri, Burstin, Burt, Butrumlis, Luscombe, McTaggart, and Smith were joined in the studio by sessions musicians including Ed Bates (ex-The Sports) on guitar; Joe Creighton (ex-Billy T) on bass guitar; Ross Hannaford (ex-Daddy Cool, Billy T) on guitar; Andrew Pendlebury (ex-The Sports) on guitar; and The Blackberries on vocal harmonies.

=== "Classic era": 1986–1993 ===
By November 1986 the Black Sorrows line-up was Camilleri, Burstin, Luscombe and Smith; with Johnny Charles on bass guitar. The group were playing mostly original material. The group released "Mystified" which gained radio play and peaked at number 24 on the Kent Music Report. The group's fourth studio album, Dear Children (April 1987), which was co-produced by Camilleri and Burstin, initially appeared on Camel Records. but CBS signed them to a distribution deal. With CBS promoting, it peaked at No. 22 the Australian Kent Music Report albums chart in June. In May that year, the single, "Daughters of Glory", had reached the top 50 on the related Kent Music Report singles chart.

Additional session musicians used on Dear Children included: Butrumlis; Tony Faeshe on guitar and viola; Venetta Fields on backing vocals; Mick Girasole on bass guitar; Paul Grabowsky on piano; Sherlie Matthews on backing vocals; Mick O'Connor on keyboards and Hammond organ. The band often made use of session or touring musicians including Sam See on slide guitar, Tony Norris on trumpet, and Kerryn Tolhurst on guitar.

During 1988 Smith left the performance line-up, however he continued writing lyrics for the Black Sorrows over the following two decades. By mid-year Burt had returned on guitar, Charles was replaced by Girasole on bass guitar, and Vika and Linda Bull joined on backing vocals and occasional lead vocals (ex-Sophisticated Boom Boom, The Sacred Hearts of Sweet Temptation, The Honeymooners). Australian journalist Ed Nimmervoll described the "classic line-up" of the group as Camilleri, Linda and Vika Bull, Burstin, Burt, Girasole and Luscombe. The Bull sisters' readily identifiable singing style became a big part of The Black Sorrows' sound. At live gigs each had their own "spots" showing different voices: "Vika strong and soulful. Linda soft and gentle."

The group's fifth album, Hold on to Me, was issued in September 1988, which was co-produced by Burstin and Camilleri. As well as the standard version CBS released a limited edition 2× LP in Australia. AllMusic's Rudyard Kennedy felt the lead singer was able to "channel the voice and persona of" Van Morrison and while the group "borrow many of the same ingredients" however "the trick is in mixing those well-worn ingredients together and coming up with something new" such that the album "deserves to be heard and hailed by music fans the world over".

The album peaked at No. 7 on the ARIA Albums Chart in May 1989 and remained in the top 50 for 46 weeks. It provided two top 40 hits on the associated Singles Chart: "Chained to the Wheel" (March 1989 – their highest-charting single at No. 9) and "The Crack-Up" (April). At the ARIA Music Awards of 1990 they won Best Group. Internationally Hold on to Me peaked at No. 6 on the Norwegian Albums Chart; No. 18 on the Swedish Albums Chart; and No. 35 on the New Zealand Albums Chart.

Before recording their sixth album, Harley and Rose (August 1990), Jen Anderson was added on violin (ex-Kings of the World); and Richard Sega replaced Girasole on bass guitar. It was co-produced by Camilleri, Burstin and Luscombe; and the CD format has six bonus tracks compared with the LP version. It peaked at No. 3 in Australia and remained in the top 50 for 51 weeks; No. 5 in Norway; and No. 36 in Sweden. The album produced two top 30 singles; "Harley + Rose" and "Never Let Me Go".

The Revelators—a band made up of members of the Black Sorrows—released their first album, Amazing Stories, in December 1991. The Revelators sound was a return to early The Black Sorrows material: playing largely R&B-oriented cover songs.

Burt left the Black Sorrows before recording for their seventh album, Better Times (September 1992), and Stephen Hadley (ex-Kate Ceberano and the Ministry of Fun) replaced Sega on bass guitar. Also added to the line-up were Barker and James Black (on keyboards) of The Relevators. Finally, Laurie Polec took over as the band's primary lyricist, although Smith contributed to this and future releases. Better Times peaked at No. 13 in Australia.

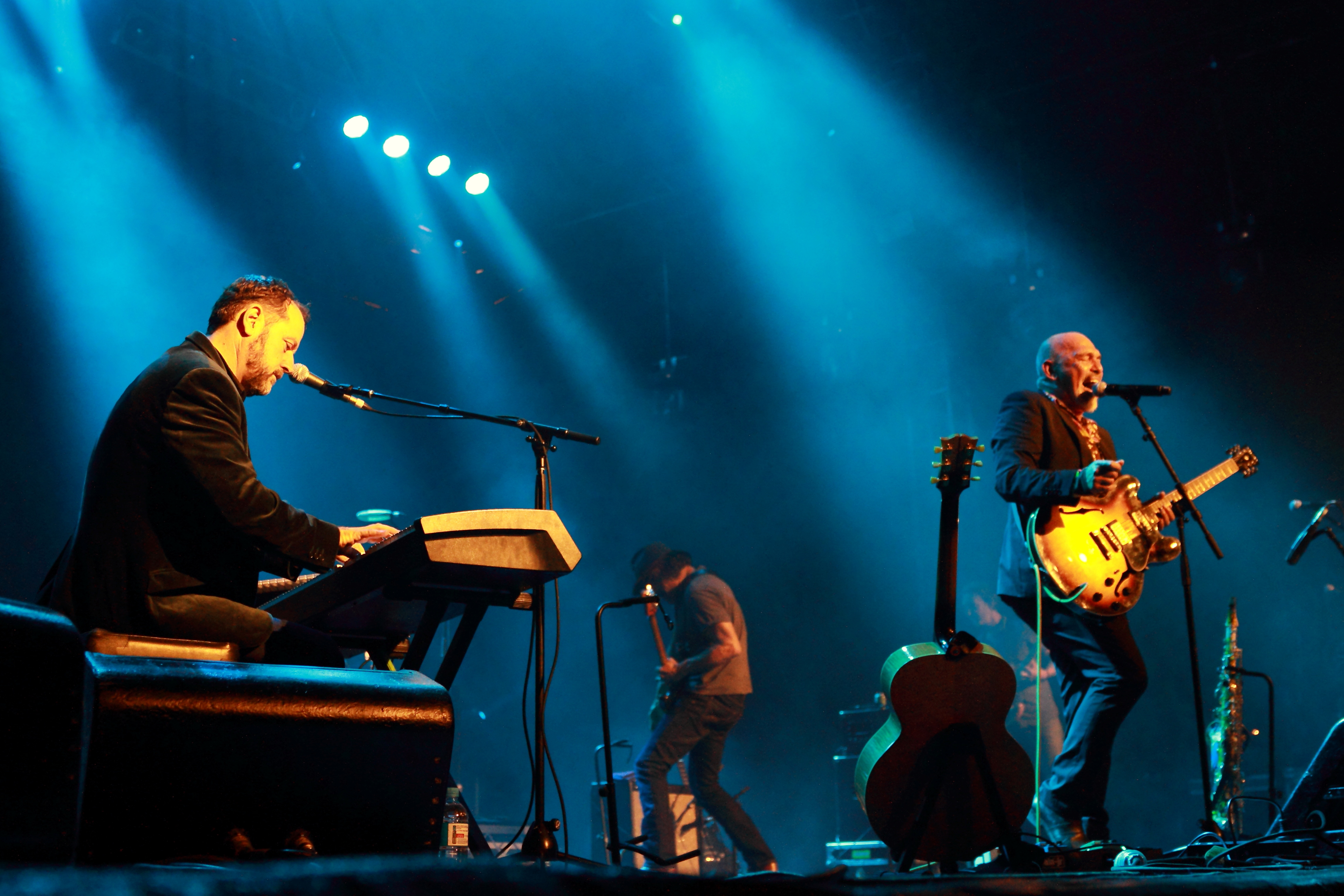
The Black Sorrows play at Byron Bay Bluesfest, April 2014

In March 1993 the group re-released Better Times as 2× CD pack with The Revelators' Amazing Stories as a bonus disc. The pack reached No. 14 in Australia. In September, the Black Sorrows released "Stir It Up" – a cover of the Bob Marley track. Their first greatest hits album, The Chosen Ones - Greatest Hits, appeared in November 1993, which peaked at No. 4 in January 1994.

By the end of 1993, Camilleri announced that after The Chosen Ones Tour, the current line-up of The Black Sorrows would be dissolved. It became his solo band with "a floating line-up of specially selected musicians". Vika and Linda launched their duo career in March 1994. Luscombe was later a session drummer or band member for various groups including Paul Kelly Band (and associated side projects Professor Ratbaggy and Stardust Five), and as from May 2014 is a member of the SBS-TV quiz show, RocKwiz house band, RocKwiz Orkestra since 2005. Black also worked as a session musician or band member including for Sherine's X Machine, Things of Stone and Wood, Deborah Conway, and with Luscombe on RocKwiz since 2005.

=== New line-ups: 1994–98 ===
For the new iteration of The Black Sorrows, Camilleri retained only Hadley from the previous line-up. The group's next album, Lucky Charm (November 1994) was recorded in New York with Camilleri co-producing with Kerryn Tolhurst. In the studio the Camilleri called on the services of Hadley on bass guitar, Tolhurst on guitar, mandolin, tiple and keyboards, Rob Burke on saxophone, Claude Carranza on guitar, Steve Ferrone on drums, and Andy York on guitar. Lyrics for the album's songs were supplied by James Griffin, Smith or Polec. McFarlane noted that the album was "a more reflective, rootsier collection than previous band efforts". It reached No. 20 in Australia.

The group's ninth studio album, Beat Club was released in November 1998. This album introduced Floyd on drums who had joined the band in 1995.The album was co-produced by Camilleri, Black and Tolhurst. It also used guest musicians including Burstin, Burt and Renée Geyer on vocals. McFarlane described it as containing "R&B-tinged jazz and blues tunes". The lead single, "New Craze" (August 1997), was nominated at the 1998 APRA Awards for Most Performed Jazz Work in Australia for its writers Camilleri, Smith and Black.

In the early 2000s Camilleri founded another side project, Bakelite Radio, which temporarily supplanted his recording activity with The Black Sorrows. As is characteristic of Camilleri's projects, Bakelite Radio started as a loosely organised covers band with a fluid membership. However, the players in Bakelite Radio were generally similar to the membership of the concurrent line-up of The Black Sorrows, with only the repertoire differing.

Camilleri also reunited with The Revelators and released ARIA Award nominated studio albums in 2000 and 2002.

=== Return from hiatus: 2004–08 ===
The Black Sorrows returned from hiatus and released an acoustic album, One Mo' Time, in 2004 with returning members Camilleri, Black, Burstin, Floyd and Hadley.

The band's follow-up album was Roarin' Town, released in October 2006. For this release, The Black Sorrows were Camilleri, Black, Floyd, Hadley, and the returning Carranza. Black, Carranza and Floyd had also played with Camilleri in Bakelite Radio. As well, Nick Smith, who had been one of several lyricists used by The Black Sorrows in the previous decade, was now once again the band's sole lyricist in terms of the band's new original material.

The 2006 touring line-up of The Black Sorrows consisted of Camilleri, Black, Creighton, Carranza, Floyd, and new recruits Annette Roche and Troy McMillan on backing vocals. When the band resumed touring in 2007, Roche and McMillan had left the group.

A one-time only gig in December 2008 featured a Black Sorrows line-up that traversed different eras of the band. This line-up included Camilleri, Anderson, Bates, Vika and Linda Bull, Butrumlis, Carranza, Creighton and Floyd.

=== Later activity: 2009–present ===
Camilleri continued performing with The Black Sorrows, The Revelators and Bakelite Radio at gigs with a changing roster of musicians. In late 2009 The Black Sorrows released a CD/DVD compilation pack, 4 Days in Sing Sing (2009). The DVD chronicles the making of the album, which consists of 17 tracks recorded live-in-the-studio at Sing Sing Studios in Melbourne. All tracks were versions of The Black Sorrows and Bakelite Radio tracks.

The 2010-2012 Black Sorrows line-up consisted of Camilleri, Carranza, Creighton, and Floyd, alongside new vocalist Atlanta Coogan who joined in 2010. In 2012 the line-up released Crooked Little Thoughts, a 72-page hard cover book including 3× CDs, photos, lyrics and the artwork of Victor Rubin.

By 2013 the line-up had shuffled again. Camilleri and Carranza were now joined by Angus Burchall on drums, Mark Gray on bass guitar, and John McAll on keyboards and backing vocals.

The group released their 14th album Certified Blue produced by Camilleri and John McAll, on April Fool's Day 2014. A pair of follow-up albums, consisting of cover songs recorded during the 'Certified Blue sessions, were released simultaneously the following year. Entitled Endless Sleep Chapter 46 and Endless Sleep Chapter 47 produced by Camilleri and John McAll, these albums were issued on vinyl, with a CD version included as a bonus -- the CDs were not available to purchase separately.

In September 2016, keeping the same line-up, The Black Sorrows released Faithful Satellite, produced by Camilleri and John McAll, their 17th studio album.

2019 saw the release of Citizen John produced by Camilleri and recorded at Woodstock Studios in Melbourne. This was all Camilleri and Smith songs with the exception of Silvio, a Bob Dylan Robert Hunter cover. Drummer Angus Burchall left the band in this year, with Floyd returning as drummer and backing vocalist.

The Black Sorrows released their 19th studio album, Saint Georges Road, in September 2021.

In 2024, the Black Sorrows released the studio album The Way We Do Business.

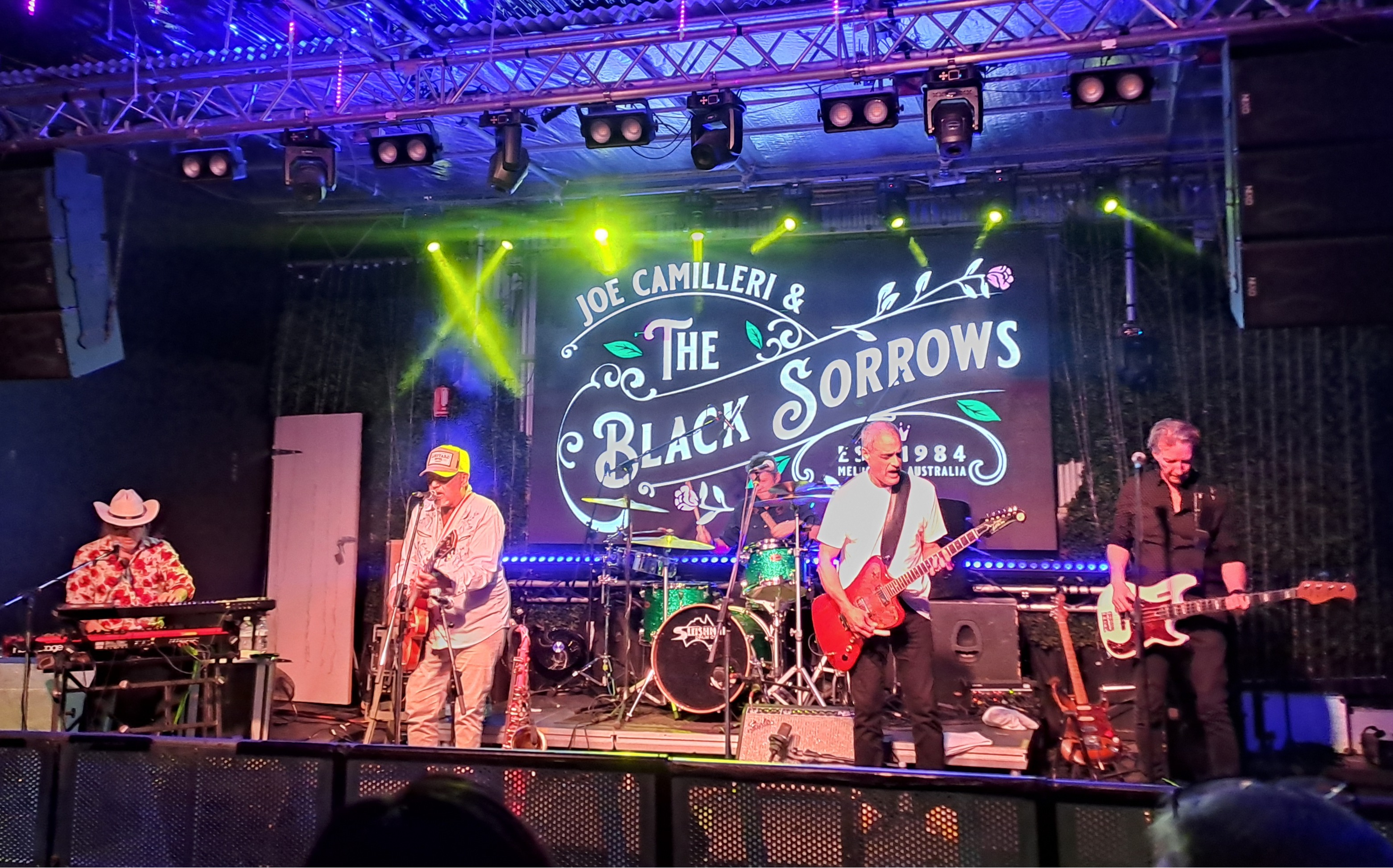
The Black Sorrows in Albury, March 2025

In October 2025, the Black Sorrows released the compilation The Quintessential Black Sorrows and consequently embarked on a national tour supporting the album.

The Black Sorrows have continued to tour, with Joe Camilleri (vocals, guitar, saxophone, harmonica) joined by long-term collaborators James Black (keyboards, vocals), Claude Carranza (guitar, vocals), Tony Floyd (drums, vocals) and Mark Gray (bass, vocals), reflecting the band’s continuing evolution while maintaining a strong live following.

== Members ==
According to sources:

- Joe Camilleri (aka Joey Vincent) – vocals, saxophone, guitar, harmonica (1983–98, 2004–present)
- Jeff Burstin – guitar, mandolin (1983–93, 2004)
- Wayne Burt – guitar, backing vocals (1983–85, 1988–91, 1998)
- George Butrumlis – piano accordion (1983–86, 1987 sessions)
- Wayne Duncan – bass guitar (1983–84)
- Steve McTaggart – violin (1983–85)
- Paul Williamson – clarinet, saxophone (1983–84)
- Gary Young – drums (1983–84)
- Peter Luscombe – drums, percussion (1985–93)
- Nick Smith – backing vocals (1985–88), lyricist (1985–present)
- Ed Bates – guitar (1985 sessions)
- Joe Creighton – bass guitar, backing vocals (1985 sessions, 1998, 2004–12)
- Ross Hannaford – guitar (1985 sessions)
- Andrew Pendlebury – guitar (1985 sessions)
- The Blackberries – backing vocals (1985 sessions)
- Johnny Charles – bass guitar (1986–88)
- Venetta Fields – backing vocals (1987 sessions)
- Mick Girasole – bass guitar (1987 sessions, 1988–89)
- Linda Bull – backing vocals, lead vocals (1988–93)
- Vika Bull – backing vocals, lead vocals (1988–93)
- Jen Anderson – violin (1989–93)
- Richard Sega – bass guitar (1989–91)
- Michael Barker – percussion (1991–93)
- James Black – keyboards, organ, piano (1991–93, 1998, 2004–09, 2019-present)
- Stephen Hadley – bass guitar (1991–94, 2004)
- Laurie Polec – lyrics (1991–94, 1998)
- Rob Burke – saxophone (1991 - 1998)
- Claude Carranza – guitar (1994, 2004–present)
- Steve Ferrone – drums (1994)
- Kerryn Tolhurst – guitar, mandolin, tiple, keyboards (1994)
- Andy York – guitar (1994)
- Tony Floyd – drums, vocals (1995-2013, 2019-present)
- Nick Haywood – bass guitar (1998)
- Troy McMillan – backing vocals (2006–07)
- Annette Roche – backing vocals (2006–07)
- Atlanta Coogan – vocals (2010)
- Angus Burchall – drums (2013–2019)
- John McAll – keyboards, backing vocals producer (2013–2019)
- Mark Gray – bass guitar (2013–present)

== Discography ==
- Sonola (1984)
- Rockin' Zydeco (1985)
- A Place in the World (1985)
- Dear Children (1987)
- Hold on to Me (1988)
- Harley and Rose (1990)
- Better Times (1992)
- Lucky Charm (1994)
- Beat Club (1998)
- One Mo' Time (2004)
- Roarin' Town (2006)
- 4 Days in Sing Sing (2009)
- Crooked Little Thoughts (2012)
- Certified Blue (2014)
- Endless Sleep Chapter 46 (2015)
- Endless Sleep Chapter 47 (2015)
- Faithful Satellite (2016)
- Citizen John (2019)
- Saint Georges Road (2021)
- The Way We Do Business (2024)

== Awards and nominations ==
=== APRA Awards ===
The APRA Awards are held in Australia and New Zealand by the Australasian Performing Right Association to recognise songwriting skills, sales and airplay performance by its members annually.

Year	Award	Work	Result
1991	Country Song of the Year	"Harley + Rose"	Won
1998	Most Performed Jazz Work	"New Craze"	Nominated
2023	Most Performed Blues & Roots Work	"Livin' Like Kings"	Nominated

=== ARIA Awards ===
The ARIA Music Awards is an annual awards ceremony that recognises excellence, innovation, and achievement across all genres of Australian music.

Year	Award	Work	Result
1989	Album of the Year	Hold On to Me	Nominated
1989	Best Group	Hold On to Me	Nominated
1989	Best Adult Contemporary Album	Hold On to Me	Nominated
1989	Engineer of the Year	Doug Brady for Hold On to Me	Won
1989	Producer of the Year	Joe Camilleri & Jeff Burstein for Hold On to Me	Nominated
1990	Song of the Year	"Chained to the Wheel"	Nominated
1990	Single of the Year	"Chained to the Wheel"	Nominated
1990	Best Group	Hold On to Me	Won
1991	Song of the Year	"Harley + Rose"	Nominated
1991	Best Group	Harley and Rose	Nominated
1991	Album of the Year	Harley and Rose	Nominated
1992	Best Group	"Never Let Me Go"	Nominated
1993	Best Group	Better Times	Nominated
1993	Producer of the Year	Joe Camilleri for "Ain't Love the Strangest Thing", "Better Times", "Come on, Come On"	Nominated
1993	Best Cover Art	Pascoe & Gray Design, Eryk Photography for Better Times	Nominated
1994	Producer of the Year	Joe Camilleri for "Stir It Up", "Come on, Come On"	Nominated
1995	Best Adult Contemporary Album	Lucky Charm	Nominated
1997	Engineer of the Year	Charles Dickie for "New Craze"	Nominated
1999	Best Adult Contemporary Album	Beat Club	Nominated
2015	Best Blues & Roots Album	Endless Sleep	Nominated

=== Music Victoria Awards ===
The Music Victoria Awards are an annual awards night celebrating Victorian music. They commenced in 2006.

Year	Nominee / work	Award	Result	Ref.
2022	The Black Sorrows	Best Blues Work	Nominated	
