= The Crack Up =

Single by The Black Sorrows

from the album Hold On to Me
- Released: 1 May 1989
- Genre: Blues rock
- Length: 3:24
- Label: CBS
- Songwriter(s): Joe Camilleri, Nick Smith
- Producer(s): Jeff Burstin, Joe Camilleri

The Black Sorrows singles chronology
| "Chained to the Wheel" (1989) | "The Crack Up" (1989) | "Fire Down Below" (1989) |

"The Crack Up" (sometimes styled as "The Crack-Up") is a song by Australian blues and rock band The Black Sorrows. It was released as the fourth single from their fifth studio album Hold On to Me (1988). The song peaked at number 40 in June 1989.

== Track listing ==
7" single (CBS 654858 7)

1. "The Crack Up" – 3:24
2. "The Story Never Changes" – 4:36

== Charts ==
| Chart (1989) | Peak position |
|---|---|
| Australia (ARIA) | 40 |
