= The Pelaco Brothers =

Australian band

- Origin: Melbourne, Victoria, Australia
- Genre: Rockabilly
- Years active: 1974–1975
- Labels: Ralph; Missing Link Records
- Past members: Joe Camilleri; Stephen Cummings; Peter Lillie; Johnny Topper; Karl Wolfe; Chris Worrall; Ed Bates; Peter Martin

The Pelaco Brothers (sometimes seen as The Pelaco Bros.) were an Australian rockabilly band formed in 1974, with Joe Camilleri on saxophone and vocals, Stephen Cummings on lead vocals, Peter Lillie on guitar and vocals, Johnny Topper on bass guitar, Karl Wolfe (Sharks) on drums and Chris Worrall on guitar. Later members included Ed Bates on guitar and Peter Martin on slide guitar. The group only existed for 18 months; however, according to Australian musicologist, Ian McFarlane, they "virtually defined a scene that encompassed a new musical aesthetic ... [they] sang about truck drivers, roadhouses and endless highways" and although American-influenced they "presented a fiercely Australian outlook". They disbanded by late 1975 leaving behind a six-track extended play, The Pelaco Bros., which appeared the following year. Camilleri formed a blues and rock music band, Jo Jo Zep & The Falcons; while Cummings and Bates formed a new wave group, the Sports in 1976.

== History ==
The Pelaco Brothers formed in 1974 in Melbourne with Joe Camilleri (ex-King Bees, Lipp and the Double Dekker Brothers, Sharks) on saxophone and vocals, Stephen Cummings (ex-Ewe and the Merinos) on lead vocals, Peter Lillie on guitar and vocals, Johnny Topper on bass guitar, Karl Wolfe on drums and Chris Worrall on guitar. The group were named for the Pelaco Sign which advertised a local shirt manufacturer. According to Australian musicologist, Ian McFarlane, they played "rockabilly, country swing and R&B that recalled American outfits like Commander Cody and His Lost Planet Airmen and Dan Hicks and his Hot Licks. Yet, the band's delivery presented a fiercely Australian outlook". Only existing for 18 months, they later included Ed Bates on guitar and Peter Martin on slide guitar.

Their posthumous releases were The Notorious Pelaco Brothers Show a live six-track extended play—also seen as The Pelaco Bros.—on the Ralph imprint in 1976 and three studio tracks for the various artists release, The Autodrifters and The Relaxed Mechanics Meet The Fabulous Nudes and The Pelaco Bros, in June 1978 on Missing Link Records. The Pelaco Brothers had disbanded in late 1975, Camilleri went on to form a blues and rock music band, Jo Jo Zep & The Falcons; Meanwhile, Cummings and Bates formed a new wave group, the Sports in 1976.

Lillie formed Relaxed Mechanics with Iain Colquhoun on bass guitar, John Lloyd on drums, Nick Rischbieth on guitar (ex-Sharks) and Dave Steel on vocals. Topper founded The Fabulous Nudes, a country and western group, with Pierre Jaquinot on guitar and vocals (ex-Spo-Dee-O-Dee); Jimmy Jessop on vocals and harmonica (Spo-Dee-O-Dee), Warwick Kennington on drums (Uncle Bob's Band); and Peter Morrison on guitar and harmonica. Soon after both groups disbanded, Lillie and Topper created The Autodrifters and they were soon joined by Warren Rough on guitar and former bandmate, Wolfe on drums. By May 1978 Rick Dempster on vocals and harmonica became a member of The Autodrifters.

According to McFarlane, Lillie "remained a cult figure on the Melbourne music scene for many years". He recorded three solo singles between 1979 and 1981 and these, along with six other tracks, were compiled on an album, Peter Lillie's Guitar Method, in 1981.

In 1982 the Pelaco Brothers' music was used for a suburban horror film, This Woman Is Not a Car. Lillie's second solo album, Poetry & Western, was issued in early 1997. On 13 September 2012, Peter Lillie died of liver disease, aged 61. Chris Worrall died on 9 May 2024.

== Discography ==
=== Extended plays ===
Title	Details
The Notorious Pelaco Brothers Show	Released: 1976; Label: Ralph RR001 E
