= Never Let Me Go (The Black Sorrows song) =

1991 single by the Black Sorrows

Single by the Black Sorrows

from the album Harley and Rose
- B-side: "A Place in the World"; "Brown Eyed Girl"
- Released: 28 January 1991
- Length: 4:04
- Label: CBS
- Songwriter(s): Joe Camilleri, Nick Smith
- Producer(s): Jeff Burstin, Joe Camilleri, Peter Luscombe

The Black Sorrows singles chronology
"Angel Street" (1990)	"Never Let Me Go" (1991)	"Hold It Up to the Mirror" (1991)

"Never Let Me Go" is a song by Australian blues and rock band the Black Sorrows. It was released in January 1991 as the third single from their sixth studio album, Harley and Rose. It peaked at 30 on the Australian ARIA Singles Chart in April 1991. Lead vocals on the track are by Vika Bull, with her sister Linda providing harmony and backing vocals. At the ARIA Music Awards of 1992, the song earned the Black Sorrows a nomination for Best Group, losing to "Live Baby Live" by INXS.

== Track listings ==
Australian 7-inch single

1. "Never Let Me Go" – 4:04
2. "Never Let Me Go" (Swamp mix) – 4:17

UK and Australian CD and 12-inch single

1. "Never Let Me Go" – 4:04
2. "A Place in the World" – 4:33
3. "Brown Eyed Girl" – 3:32
4. "Never Let Me Go" (Swamp mix) – 4:17

== Weekly charts ==
Chart (1991)	Peak position
Australia (ARIA)	30

== Cover versions ==
- In 2006, Vika and Linda Bull recorded an acoustic version for their album Between Two Shores.
