= Rockin' Zydeco =

Studio album by The Black Sorrows
- Released: 1 March 1985
- Recorded: 24 November 1984, A.A.V. Studios
- Genre: Folk rock; Zydeco music
- Label: Spirit Records
- Producer: Joey Vincent

The Black Sorrows chronology
Sonola (1984)	Rockin' Zydeco (1985)	A Place in the World (1985)

Singles from Rockin' Zydeco
- 1. "The Shape I'm In" Released: March 2, 1985

Alternative cover
- 2002 re-release cover

Rockin' Zydeco is the second studio album by Australian rock band The Black Sorrows. The album was released in March 1985 and consisted of most cover versions of soul and R&B songs.

The album was re-released in CD in 2002.

== Background ==
Joe Camilleri says; "I was really into zydeco music, so I got a bunch of desperadoes together, including Steve McTaggart on violin, George Butrumlis on piano accordion, Paul Williamson on clarinet, Wayne Burt on guitar, Wayne Duncan on bass, and Gary Young on drums. We did a couple of gigs and said, Hey, let’s make a record. I’d recommend that any band do things themselves. Making a record can be as expensive or as inexpensive as you want. You can make a record on a credit card, if you want."

== Track listing ==
CD track listing

No.	Title	Writer(s)	Length
1.	"The Shape I'm In"	Lee Cathy; Otis Blackwell	2:20
2.	"Corrina Corrina"	Armenter "Bo Carter" Chatmon; Mitchell Parish; J. Mayo Williams	2:48
3.	"Sweet Way I'm In"	Joe Camilleri	0:33
4.	"Tomorrow Night"	Thomas; Womack	2:55
5.	"Hey Mama"	Cafton Carrier	3:14
6.	"Sweet Way Out"	Camilleri	0:35
7.	"Hold on to That Tiger"	Altin Rubin	3:07
8.	"My Negress"	Traditional	3:04
