= Saint Georges Road =

Studio album by the Black Sorrows
- Released: 10 September 2021
- Genre: Blues rock
- Label: Ambition Records
- Producer: Peter Solley

The Black Sorrows chronology
Citizen John (2019)	Saint Georges Road (2021)

Singles from Saint Georges Road
- 1. "Livin' Like Kings" Released: 13 August 2021; 2. "Revolutionary Blues" Released: 17 September 2021; 3. "Chiquita" Released: December 2021; 4. "Saint Georges Road" Released: 28 January 2022

Saint Georges Road is the nineteenth studio album by Australian blues rock band, the Black Sorrows. The album was released on 10 September 2021. The album sees the band reunite with English producer Peter Solley, who produced Jo Jo Zep & The Falcons' 1979 album, Screaming Targets, which featured Joe Camilleri's first Top 40 hits "Hit and Run" and "Shape I'm In".

The album will be supported with Australian Livin' Like Kings tour.

== Reception ==
Jeff Jenkins from Stack Magazine said "Saint Georges Road is sophisticated, soulful and superb, a crowning moment in a career that refuses to look back." The Australian called it the group's "most accessible album yet."

== Track listing ==
1. "What Stephanie Knows"
2. "What's Taken Your Smile Away"
3. "Livin' Like Kings"
4. "Saint Georges Road"
5. "Another Blue Day"
6. "Chiquita"
7. "Holy Man"
8. "Revolutionary Blues"
9. "My Heart Don't Feel a Thing"
10. "Only Got Yourself to Blame"
11. "King Without a Throne"
12. "Out of Your Mind" (Collectors Edition Track)
13. "Holy Man" (demo) (Collectors Edition Track)
14. "It's Your Fault (I Cant Get Back to Sleep)" (Collectors Edition Track)
15. "Revolutionary Blues" (demo) (Collectors Edition Track)
16. "Sittin' on Top of the World" (Collectors Edition Track)

== Charts ==
=== Weekly charts ===
Chart performance for Saint Georges Road
Chart (2021)	Peak position
Australian Albums (ARIA)	14

=== Year-end charts ===
Chart (2021)	Position
Australian Jazz and Blues Albums (ARIA)	8

== Release history ==
Release history and formats for Saint Georges Road
Region	Date	Format	Edition	Label	Catalogue
Australia	10 September 2021	Digital download, CD	Standard edition	Ambition Records	AMBITION144
Australia	10 September 2021	CD	Collectors Edition	Ambition Records	AMBITION144D
Australia	29 October 2021	Limited edition vinyl	LP Edition	Ambition Records	AMBITION144V
