= Ain't Love the Strangest Thing =

1992 single by the Black Sorrows

Single by the Black Sorrows

from the album Better Times (album)
- B-side: "I Will Follow You Down"
- Released: 3 August 1992
- Length: 5:08
- Label: CBS
- Songwriter(s): Joe Camilleri
- Producer(s): Joe Camilleri, Laurie Polec

The Black Sorrows singles chronology
"Hold It Up to the Mirror" (1991)	"Ain't Love the Strangest Thing" (1992)	"Better Times" (1992)

"Ain't Love the Strangest Thing" is a song by Australian blues and rock band the Black Sorrows. It was released in August 1992 as the first single from their seventh studio album, Better Times. It peaked at 46 on the Australian Singles Chart in September 1992.

== Track listing ==
Australian maxi-CD

1. "Ain't Love the Strangest Thing" – 5:08
2. "I Will Follow You Down" – 4:26
3. "What Does It Take (To Win Your Love)" (by the Revelators) – 3:53

== Weekly charts ==
Chart (1992)	Peak position
Australia (ARIA)	46
