= Chained to the Wheel =

Single by The Black Sorrows

from the album Hold On to Me
- Released: 23 January 1989
- Genre: Blues rock
- Length: 3:57
- Label: CBS
- Songwriter(s): Joe Camilleri; Nick Smith
- Producer(s): Jeff Burstin, Joe Camilleri

The Black Sorrows singles chronology
"The Chosen Ones" (1988)	"Chained to the Wheel" (1989)	"The Crack Up" (1989)

"Chained to the Wheel" is a song by Australian blues and rock band The Black Sorrows. It was released as the third single from their fifth studio album Hold On to Me. It was a big hit, peaking at 9 on the ARIA Charts.

At the ARIA Music Awards of 1990, the song was nominated for Single of the Year, losing to "Crying in the Chapel" by Peter Blakeley, and Song of the Year, losing to "Tucker's Daughter" by Ian Moss.

== Track listing ==
7" single (CBS 654548 7)

1. "Chained to the Wheel" – 3:57
2. "Waiting for the Rain" – 5:02

== Charts ==
=== Weekly charts ===
Chart (1989)	Peak position
Australia (ARIA)	9
New Zealand (Recorded Music NZ)	42

=== Year-end charts ===
Chart (1989)	Position
Australia (ARIA)	50
Australian Artist Singles (ARIA)	10

== Certification ==
Region	Certification	Certified units/sales
Australia (ARIA)	Gold	35,000^{^}
^{^} Shipments figures based on certification alone.

== Cover versions ==
- In 1991, John Denver covered this song on his album, Different Directions.
- In 2006, Vika and Linda Bull re-recorded an acoustic version for their album Between Two Shores.
