= Harley and Rose =

Studio album by The Black Sorrows
- Released: 21 September 1990
- Recorded: 1989−90
- Studio: Sing Sing Studios, RBX Studios
- Genre: Folk rock; pop rock; country rock
- Length: 43:36
- Label: CBS
- Producer: Jeff Burstin, Joe Camilleri, Peter Luscombe

The Black Sorrows chronology
Hold On to Me (1988)	Harley and Rose (1990)	Better Times (1992)

Singles from Harley and Rose
- 1. "Harley + Rose" Released: July 1990; 2. "Angel Street" Released: November 1990; 3. "Never Let Me Go" Released: January 1991; 4. "Hold It Up to the Mirror" Released: June 1991

Harley and Rose is the sixth studio album by Australian rock band The Black Sorrows. The album was released in September 1990 and peaked at number three on the ARIA Charts, becoming the band's first top five album. The album remained in the top 50 for 51 weeks. The title track is "Harley And Rose" on the CD booklet, "Harley & Rose" on the CD, and "Harley + Rose" on vinyl.

At the ARIA Music Awards of 1991, the album was nominated for two ARIA Awards; Album of the Year and Best Group but lost to Blue Sky Mining by Midnight Oil for both awards.

== Critical reception ==
Professional ratings
Review scores
Source	Rating
AllMusic	4.5/5 stars

Tom Demalon of AllMusic felt that although "rooted in country, folk, and blues ... the band doesn't allow themselves to be stuck in any one genre and they flirt from one style to another, enthusiastically anchored only by the literate songwriting and tight musicianship displayed throughout".

== Track listing ==
=== CD (CBS – 467133 2) ===
All lyrics are written by Nick Smith, except where noted; all music is composed by Joe Camilleri, except where noted.

No.	Title	Lyrics	Music	Length
1.	"Harley + Rose"			3:54
2.	"Never Let Me Go"			4:03
3.	"Love Goes Wild"			3:25
4.	"Hold It Up To The Mirror"			5:43
5.	"Carried By The Light"			4:45
6.	"Angel Street"			3:55
7.	"Tears For The Bride"			4:03
8.	"Small Changes"	Laurie Polec		4:01
9.	"Soul On Fire"			5:56
10.	"Calling Card"	Wayne Burt	Wayne Burt	4:34
11.	"Cannonball Café"			3:54
12.	"Rise And Fall"			3:50
13.	"House Of Light"			5:01
14.	"Baby It's A Crime"			3:55
15.	"Deadline Blues"			3:16
16.	"Lay Your Head Down"			4:48

=== Vinyl (CBS 467133 1) ===
All lyrics are written by Nick Smith; all music is composed by Joe Camilleri.

Side A
No.	Title	Length
1.	"Harley + Rose"	3:54
2.	"Never Let Me Go"	4:03
3.	"Love Goes Wild"	3:25
4.	"Hold It Up To The Mirror"	5:43
5.	"Angel Street"	3:55

Side B
No.	Title	Length
1.	"Soul On Fire"	5:56
2.	"Carried By The Light"	4:45
3.	"House Of Light"	5:01
4.	"Tears For The Bride"	4:03
5.	"Cannonball Cafe"	3:54

== Personnel ==
The Black Sorrows

- Joe Camilleri - lead and harmony vocals, guitars, sax, hammond organ; additional snare on 14
- Jen Anderson - violin
- Linda Bull - vocals
- Vika Bull - vocals; lead vocals on "Never Let Me Go"
- Wayne Burt - guitar
- Jeff Burstin - guitar, mandolin; bass on 14
- Peter Luscombe - drums, percussion
- Richard Sega - bass

with:

- James Black - hammond organ, piano, Harmonium, guitar, sitar
- Joe Creighton - bass, additional vocals
- Venetta Fields - additional vocals

and:

- Peter Bishop - trumpet on 9
- Danny Bourke - violin on 5
- George Butrumlis - accordion on 5, 14
- Phil Butson - guitar on 5
- Paul Grabowsky - piano on 11, 12, 16
- Steven Hadley - acoustic bass on 4, 15
- Gabby Halloran - strings on 3
- Ross Hannaford - guitar on 11, 13; harmony vocals on 13
- Anthony Harkin - harmonica on 1, 2
- Stephen McTaggart - strings on 3
- Dobe Newton - tin whistle on 5
- Lucky Oceans - pedal steel on 7, 16
- Alex Pertout - congas on 2, 8, 14, 15
- Ben Robinson - acoustic bass on 12
- Sam See - slide guitar on 6, 8; dobro on 15
- The Brasstards - horns on 2, 5, 11
- Bob Venier - trumpet on 12

== Charts ==
=== Weekly charts ===
Chart (1990–91)	Peak position
Australian Albums (ARIA)	3
Norwegian Albums (VG-lista)	5
Swedish Albums (Sverigetopplistan)	35

=== Year-end chart ===
Chart (1990)	Position
Australia (ARIA) Chart	72
Chart (1991)	Position
Australia (ARIA) Chart	21

== Certifications ==
Region	Certification	Certified units/sales
Australia (ARIA)	2× Platinum	140,000^{^}
^{^} Shipments figures based on certification alone.
