= Joe Camilleri =

Australian Singer/Songwriter/Musician (born 1948)

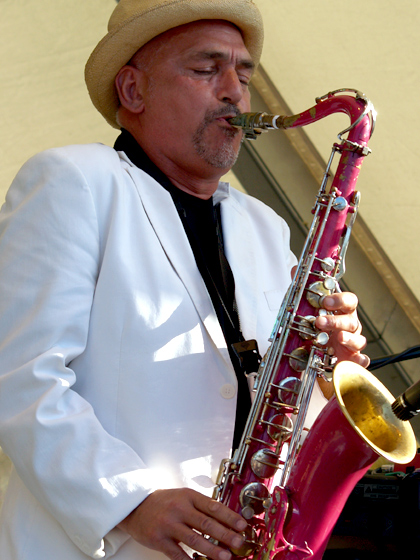
- Joe Camilleri at Mordialloc Festival, March 2006; Photo: Mandy Hall

Background information
- Also known as: Jo Jo Zep
- Born: Joseph Vincent Camilleri; 21 May 1948 (age 78); Crown Colony of Malta
- Genres: Rock, R&B, blues
- Occupations: Singer-songwriter, musician
- Instruments: Vocals, saxophone, guitar, harmonica
- Years active: 1964–present
- Member of: The Black Sorrows • Jo Jo Zep & the Falcons • The Fabulous Caprettos
- Formerly of: Adderley Smith Blues Band; the Pelaco Brothers; The Black Sorrows; • The Revelators
- Website: Joe Camilleri.com.au

Joseph Vincent Camilleri, (born 21 May 1948) aka Jo Jo Zep, is a Maltese Australian singer-songwriter and musician. Camilleri has recorded as a solo artist and as a member of Jo Jo Zep & The Falcons and The Black Sorrows. Jo Jo Zep & The Falcons' highest-charting single was "Hit & Run" from June 1979, which peaked at #12; Jo Jo Zep's "Taxi Mary" peaked at No. 11 in September 1982; and The Black Sorrows top single, "Chained to the Wheel", peaked at No. 9 in March 1989.

Camilleri has also produced records for The Sports, Jo Jo Zep & The Falcons, Paul Kelly & the Dots, The Black Sorrows, Renée Geyer, and Ross Wilson. Australian music journalist, Ian McFarlane, described him as "one of the most genuinely talented figures in Australian music", and, as a member of Jo Jo Zep & The Falcons, Camilleri was inducted into the Australian Recording Industry Association (ARIA) Hall of Fame in 2007.

The Black Sorrows' Saint Georges Road (2021) represented Camilleri's 50th career release.

== Biography ==
=== Early years ===
Joe Camilleri was born the third of ten children in Malta in 1948. The family migrated to Australia when he was two. Camilleri grew up in Port Melbourne and listened to rock music on the radio. His mother called him Zep and he became known as Jo Zep. He has five children. Camilleri began his music career in 1964 when literally thrown onstage to sing with the Drollies. He played blues and R&B in the mid-1960s with the King Bees, and was then a member of Adderley Smith Blues Band. In 1968, lead singer for the band, Broderick Smith had been conscripted for National Service during the Vietnam War. Camilleri lasted a year with Adderley Smith, and enjoyed working with the band including guitarist Kerryn Tolhurst (later in the Dingoes with Smith). According to Australian music journalist Ed Nimmervoll, Camilleri was sacked for sounding too much like Mick Jagger and upstaging other band members. After Adderley Smith, Camilleri was a member of various bands, including the Pelaco Brothers during 1974–1975.

=== Jo Jo Zep & The Falcons: 1975–1983, 2001–2003, 2011–present ===
Jo Jo Zep & The Falcons formed in 1975 and Camilleri gained national prominence as the group's lead singer, co-songwriter and saxophonist. Other members (from 1976 on) included Jeff Burstin (guitar, vocals), John Power (bass guitar, vocals), Gary Young (drums), Tony Faehse (guitar, vocals) and Wilbur Wilde on sax. Incorporating influences from blues, R&B, soul, punk rock, new wave and reggae, the group achieved considerable commercial and critical success in Australia. Hit singles for Jo Jo Zep & The Falcons included "Shape I'm In" and "Puppet on a String"; their highest-charting single was "Hit & Run" from June 1979 which peaked at No. 12.

In 1981, most of The Falcons left the group, and the act's name was shortened to Jo Jo Zep. "Taxi Mary", credited to Jo Jo Zep, peaked at No. 11 in September 1982. The Jo Jo Zep ensemble became unwieldy with, at its peak, a roster of 11 members and disbanded in 1983.

The classic 1976–1981 group reformed in 2001 for a one-off gig, but stayed together to release an album of new material, Ricochet, in 2003. As a member of Jo Jo Zep & The Falcons, Camilleri was inducted into the Australian Recording Industry Association (ARIA) Hall of Fame in 2007. The group continues to tour and play live dates.

=== The Black Sorrows: 1984–current ===
After the demise of Jo Jo Zep & the Falcons in 1983, Camilleri achieved his greatest success with another long-running group The Black Sorrows, which began in 1984 as an informal semi-acoustic band playing blues, R&B and zydeco. The Black Sorrows had a shifting line-up and at various points included three ex-Falcons: Jeff Burstin, Wayne Burt, and Gary Young. Later additions to the band included sisters Vika and Linda Bull on vocals, and backing vocalist and lyricist Nick Smith. Camilleri himself has been the only constant member of the group.

The Black Sorrows developed a strong fan following and garnered wide critical acclaim for their recordings and superb live performances. After starting life as an acoustic cover band, they evolved into a full electric ensemble that wrote their own material, releasing a string of commercially successful and critically acclaimed albums in the 1980s and 1990s. These albums included A Place in the World, Dear Children (an Australian Top 20 album in 1987), Hold On to Me (peaked at No. 7, 1988), Harley & Rose (peaked at No. 3, 1990), Better Times (peaked at No. 13, 1992) and compilation The Chosen Ones – Greatest Hits (peaked at No. 4, 1993). Top 30 hit singles by the band were "Chained to the Wheel" (which peaked at No. 9 in 1989), "Harley + Rose" (1990) "Never Let Me Go" (1990), and "Snake Skin Shoes" (1994).

For the first several years the band was in existence, Camilleri performed under the pseudonym "Joey Vincent" (a name he had previously used for a solo single), although he wrote and produced material for the group using his real name. The "Joey Vincent" persona was finally dropped in time for the release of 1990's Harley & Rose.

With a number of different line-ups, the band has continued to release material through the 1990s and 2000s.

=== Other projects ===
==== The Revelators: 1989–2012 ====
While with The Black Sorrows, Camilleri also performed with The Revelators. The Revelators returned to the Black Sorrows roots of playing mostly covers of country/R&B style music, and had virtually the same line-up as The Black Sorrows. They released their first album in 1991 called Amazing Stories and followed it up with two others, The Adventures of The Amazing Revelators (2000) and The Revelators (2002). The Revelators were active as a live group from circa 1989 through about 2012.

==== Bakelite Radio : 2000–2007, 2020, 2024 ====
Bakelite Radio was another side project from the early 2000s. This particular group focused on more acoustically-oriented music, though still in a country/R&B mold. The repertoire consisted mostly (but not exclusively) of cover songs, and the line-up (as is characteristic of Camilleri's bands) was fairly fluid.

The group released four albums between 2003 and 2009: in order of release, they were Bakelite Radio Volume II (2003), Bakelite Radio Volume III (2004) Bakelite Radio Volume IV (2007), and Bakelite Radio Volume I (2009). As a live act, Bakelite Radio was active from 2001 to 2007.

After a long hiatus, Bakelite Radio (with a largely modified line-up, save Camilleri) returned in 2020, issuing their fifth album Rosary of Tears as a combined vinyl and CD package. The group (billed as "Joey Vincent's Bakelite Radio") later made a one-shot live appearance in 2024, but has not otherwise been active.

==== The Voodoo Sheiks: 2011–present ====
The Voodoo Sheiks are a ten-piece ensemble led by Camilleri and John McAll that celebrates the musical heritage of New Orleans. The band features a large brass section, and a repertoire of cover songs. They started playing gigs circa 2011, and for a time supplanted Camilleri's previous side projects The Revelators and Bakelite Radio. The Voodoo Sheiks have yet to record under their own name, although one track on The Black Sorrows' 2014 album Certified Blue is called "The Return Of The Voodoo Sheiks" and was played by the then-current Voodoo Sheiks line-up. The Voodoo Sheiks horns include Julien Wilson, Tim Wilson, Greg Clarkson on saxophone, James Mustafa and Travis Woods on trumpet and Ben Gillespie on trombone.

==== Here Comes The Night: 2013–present ====
Here Comes The Night is a Van Morrison tribute project, spearheaded by Camilleri in association with Vince Jones and Vika Bull. Beginning in 2013, the group has performed several live shows throughout Australia.

=== Production and session work ===
Beginning in the late 1970s, Camilleri also produced recordings for other artists including The Sports, Paul Kelly & the Dots, Renée Geyer, and Ross Wilson. He can also be heard as a session musician and/or vocalist on recordings by numerous Australian recording acts, including Skyhooks, Tim Finn, Icehouse (notably saxophone on "Don't Believe Anymore" and "The Mountain" on the 1984 Sidewalk album), and Mondo Rock.

== Solo releases ==
Camilleri has only infrequently released material with solo billing. A 1980 single credited to "Joey Vincent" was his first solo project; two additional singles from the 1980s and a 1995 maxi single called "All Saint's Hotel" are his only other solo releases of original material.

=== Studio albums ===
Title	Details
Limestone (with Nicky Bomba)	Released: 2005; Label: Transmitter (TRFIG-LIME124); Format: CD, digital download

=== Compilation albums ===
Title	Details
I Believe to My Soul - The Best of 1977-2003	Released: 2004; Label: Raven Records (RVCD-207); Format: 2xCD
45 Years	Released: May 2009; Label: Head Records (HEAD114); Format: CD, digital download
Time of My Life	Released: May 2013; Label: Joe Camilleri; Format: streaming, digital download

=== Singles ===
List of singles, with selected chart positions
Title	Year	Chart positions
Title	Year	AUS
"Nosey Parker" (as Joey Vincent)	1980	—
"Celebrate (This Must Be the Day)"	1986	—
"Angel Dove"	1989	129
"All Saints Hotel"	1995	166
"A Little Love" (with The Black Sorrows and Darlinghurst)	2023	—

== Chronological list of albums ==
The Black Sorrows' Saint Georges Road (2021) represented Camilleri's 50th career release (including compilations, mini-albums/EPs, and live albums).

1. The Notorious Pelaco Brothers Show (aka The Pelaco Bros.) (1976)
2. Don't Waste It (1977)
3. Whip It Out (1977)
4. Live!! Loud and Clear (1978)
5. So Young (1978)
6. Let's Drip Awhile (1979)
7. Screaming Targets (1979)
8. Hats Off Step Lively (1980)
9. Dexterity (1981)
10. Cha (as Jo Jo Zep) (1982)
11. The Sound of Jo Jo Zep & The Falcons (1983)
12. Sonola (1984)
13. Rockin' Zydeco (1985)
14. A Place in the World (1985)
15. Dear Children (1987)
16. Hold on to Me (1988)
17. Harley and Rose (1990)
18. Amazing Stories (1991)
19. Better Times (1992)
20. The Chosen Ones – Greatest Hits (1993)
21. Lucky Charm (1994)
22. Radio Waves (1996)
23. Shape I'm In: The Complete Anthology (1997)
24. The Very Best of The Black Sorrows (1997)
25. Beat Club (1998)
26. The Adventures of The Amazing Revelators (2000)
27. The Revelators (2002)
28. Ricochet (2003)
29. Bakelite Radio Volume II (2003)
30. I Believe to My Soul - The Best of 1977-2003 (2004)
31. The Great Black Sorrows (2004)
32. Bakelite Radio Volume III (2004)
33. One Mo' Time (2004)
34. Limestone (2005)
35. Roarin' Town (2006)
36. Bakelite Radio Volume IV (2007)
37. The Best of Jo Jo Zep & The Falcons (2007)
38. The Essential Black Sorrows (2007)
39. Bakelite Radio Volume I (2009)
40. 45 Years (2009)
41. 4 Days in Sing Sing (2009)
42. Crooked Little Thoughts (2012)
43. The Best Of... The Revelators (2012)
44. Time of My Life (2013)
45. Certified Blue (2014)
46. Endless Sleep Chapter 46 (2015)
47. Endless Sleep Chapter 47 (2015)
48. Faithful Satellite (2016)
49. Citizen John (2019)
50. Saint Georges Road (2021)
51. The Way We Do Business (2024)
52. Live from the Shangri-La (2025)
53. The Quintessential Black Sorrows (2025)

== Awards and nominations ==
=== ARIA Music Awards ===
The ARIA Music Awards is an annual awards ceremony that recognises excellence, innovation, and achievement across all genres of Australian music. They commenced in 1987. Joe Camilleri was inducted into the Hall of Fame in 2007 as part of Jo Jo Zep.

Year	Nominee / work	Award	Result
2007	Joe Camilleri (as part of Jo Jo Zep)	ARIA Hall of Fame	inductee

=== Australian Songwriters Hall of Fame ===
The Australian Songwriters Hall of Fame was established in 2004 to honour the lifetime achievements of some of Australia's greatest songwriters.

Year	Nominee / work	Award	Result
2024	Himself	Australian Songwriters Hall of Fame	inducted

=== Mo Awards ===
The Australian Entertainment Mo Awards (commonly known informally as the Mo Awards), were annual Australian entertainment industry awards. They recognise achievements in live entertainment in Australia from 1975 to 2016. Joe Camilleri won one award in that time.

Year	Nominee / work	Award	Result (wins only)
1990	Joe Camilleri	Rock Performer of the Year	Won

=== Music Victoria Awards ===
The Music Victoria Awards are an annual awards night celebrating Victorian music. They commenced in 2006.

Year	Nominee / work	Award	Result	Ref.
2020	Rosary of Tears (as Joey Vincent's Bakelite Radio)	Best Blues Album	Nominated	
