= Dear Children =

Studio album by The Black Sorrows
- Released: 3 April 1987
- Recorded: 1986
- Studio: Sing Sing Studios
- Genre: Folk rock; pop rock; country rock
- Label: Camel Records / CBS Records
- Producer: Jeff Burstin, Joe Camilleri

The Black Sorrows chronology
A Place in the World (1985)	Dear Children (1987)	Hold On to Me (1988)

Singles from Dear Children
- 1. "Mystified" Released: November 1986; 2. "Daughters of Glory" Released: March 1987; 3. "Maybe Tomorrow" Released: June 1987; 4. "The Last Frontier" Released: November 1987

Dear Children is the fourth studio album by Australian rock band The Black Sorrows. It was the band's first album released through CBS Records in April 1987. According to Australian musicologist, Ian McFarlane, Dear Children "represented a turning point in the band's career". The album peaked at number 22 on the Kent Music Report in June 1987.

== Background and reception ==
The Black Sorrows had released three studio albums between 1984 and 1985 and had begun recording more original material. By November 1986 the Black Sorrows line-up was Joe Camilleri, Jeff Burstin, Peter Luscombe, Nick Smith and Johnny Charles, down from eleven members. Camilleri said that the line-up was "a lot more rockier but it has to be that way because all the gentle side of it has gone — the accordion player has gone. We still do some wonderful ballads but there is a big difference between a nine-piece band [as on the Sorrows' last tour] and a five-piece band, something has to go."

In November 1986, the band released "Mystified" which received significant radio play and peaked at number 24 on the Kent Music Report, this was the band's highest-charting single at that point. The band also performed the song on Countdown. Camilleri said; "I mortgaged the house to make Dear Children and then CBS Records stepped in and said: We like this record, we’ll buy it off you" The group signed to CBS for distribution. "Daughters of Glory" was released in March 1987 and made the top 50.

== Track listing ==
Vinyl/ Cassette/ CD (CBS – 450924 1)

No.	Title	Writer(s)	Length
1.	"Daughters of Glory"	Joe Camilleri; Nick Smith	4:08
2.	"Mystified"	Camelleri; Smith	4:35
3.	"The Big Time"	Camelleri; Smith	4:01
4.	"Tin Gods"	Camelleri; Smith	4:33
5.	"Wild Street Girl"	Camelleri; Smith	5:08
6.	"Dear Children"	Camelleri; Smith	3:21
7.	"Blue Horizon"	Camelleri; Smith	5:53
8.	"The Last Frontier"	Camelleri; Smith	3:38
9.	"Maybe Tomorrow"	Willy DeVille	3:05
10.	"Foolish Girl"	Camelleri; Smith	3:16

== Charts ==
Chart (1987)	Peak position
Australian Kent Music Report	22

== Personnel ==
The Black Sorrows:

- Joe Camilleri (as 'Joey Vincent') - vocals, sax, guitar
- Jeff Burstin - guitar, mandolin, tambourine
- Johnny Charles - bass
- Peter Luscombe - drums
- Nick Smith - harmony vocals

with:

- Accordion – George Butrumlis
- Backing Vocals – Sherlie Matthews, Venetta Fields
- Bass – Mick Grabowski, Mike Girasole
- Clarinet – John Barrett
- Electric Piano [Rhodes] – Don Nadi
- Guitar – Tony Faehse
- Organ – Mick O'Connor
- Piano, Keyboards, Marimba – Paul Grabowsky
- Saxophone – John Barrett,
- Slide Guitar – Tony Faehse
- Trombone – John Courtney
- Trumpet – Bob Vinter
- Tuba – Karl Fritzlaff, Tim Jones
