= Sonola =

Studio album by The Black Sorrows
- Released: 29 June 1984
- Recorded: 14–15 January 1984, A.A.V. Studios
- Genre: Folk rock; pop rock
- Length: 26:19
- Label: Spirit Records
- Producer: Johnny Coal, Joey Vincent, Joe Camilleri

The Black Sorrows chronology
Sonola (1984)	Rockin' Zydeco (1985)

Singles from Sonola
- 1. "Brown Eyed Girl / What a Difference a Day Makes" Released: June 1984

Alternative cover
- 2002 re-release cover

Sonola is the debut studio album by Australian rock band The Black Sorrows. The album was released in June 1984 and consisted of cover versions of soul and R&B songs.

== Background ==
In 1983, following the disbanding of Jo Jo Zep, Joe Camilleri gathered together a group of musician friends and dubbed them The Black Sorrows. The band began playing mostly covers of R&B, zydeco, soul and blues music 'for the fun of it'.

Camilleri says; "I remember playing birthday parties and weddings, just so I could get enough money to make a record. We made Sonola for $1300. I just wanted to have some sort of documentation that we existed. We did the artwork and screen-printed the covers. We’d put the covers on the line, one side only, waiting for them to dry, so we could do the other side. They’re the things you cherish, waiting for the record to be pressed and then having a lounge-room full of records and freaking out because you want to get rid of them."

== Track listing ==
CD track listing

No.	Title	Writer(s)	Length
1.	"Brown Eyed Girl"	Van Morrison	3:28
2.	"Have Mercy"	Don Covay	3:06
3.	"What a Difference a Day Makes"	María Grever; Stanley Adams	3:23
4.	"Don't Look Back"	John Lee Hooker	3:12
5.	"Promised Land"	Chuck Berry	2:33
6.	"You Better Move On"	Arthur Alexander	3:24
7.	"Before I Grow Too Old"	Dave Bartholomew	2:54
8.	"Young Boy Blues"	Phil Spector; Doc Pomus	3:36
9.	"Blow Joe Blow"	traditional	2:00
Total length:			26:19

== Charts ==
Chart (1984)	Peak position
Australian Kent Music Report	50

== Personnel ==
The Black Sorrows:

- Joe Camilleri (as 'Joey Vincent') - vocals, saxophone
- Jeff Burstin – guitar
- Wayne Burt – guitar, harmony vocals
- George Butrumlis – accordion
- Wayne Duncan - bass guitar
- Steve McTaggart – violin
- Paul Williamson – clarinet, saxophone
- Gary Young – drums

Technical credits

- Producer - 'Joey Vincent'
- Cover – Neil Curtis
- Recorded by Ross Cockle
- Remastered by Joe Camilleri
