= Harley + Rose =

1990 single by the Black Sorrows

Single by the Black Sorrows

from the album Harley and Rose
- B-side: "The Calling"
- Released: 16 July 1990
- Length: 3:51
- Label: CBS
- Songwriter(s): Joe Camilleri, Nick Smith
- Producer(s): Joe Camilleri, Jeffrey Burstin, Peter Luscombe

The Black Sorrows singles chronology
| "Fire Down Below" (1989) | "Harley + Rose" (1990) | "Angel Street" (1990) |

"Harley + Rose" is a song by Australian blues and rock band the Black Sorrows. It was released on 16 July 1990 as the first single from their sixth studio album, Harley and Rose. It peaked at 24 on the Australian ARIA Singles Chart in September 1990. At the ARIA Music Awards of 1991, the song was nominated for Song of the Year, losing to "Burn for You" by John Farnham. At the APRA Music Awards of 1991, "Harley + Rose" won Country Song of the Year.

== Track listings ==
Australian 7-inch single

1. "Harley + Rose" – 3:51
2. "The Calling" – 2:47

UK 12-inch single

1. "Harley + Rose"
2. "The Calling"
3. "Rattle Your Cage"
4. "The Chosen Ones"

== Charts ==
| Chart (1990) | Peak position |
|---|---|
| Australia (ARIA) | 24 |
