= John McAll =

Pianist, composer, arranger, and producer

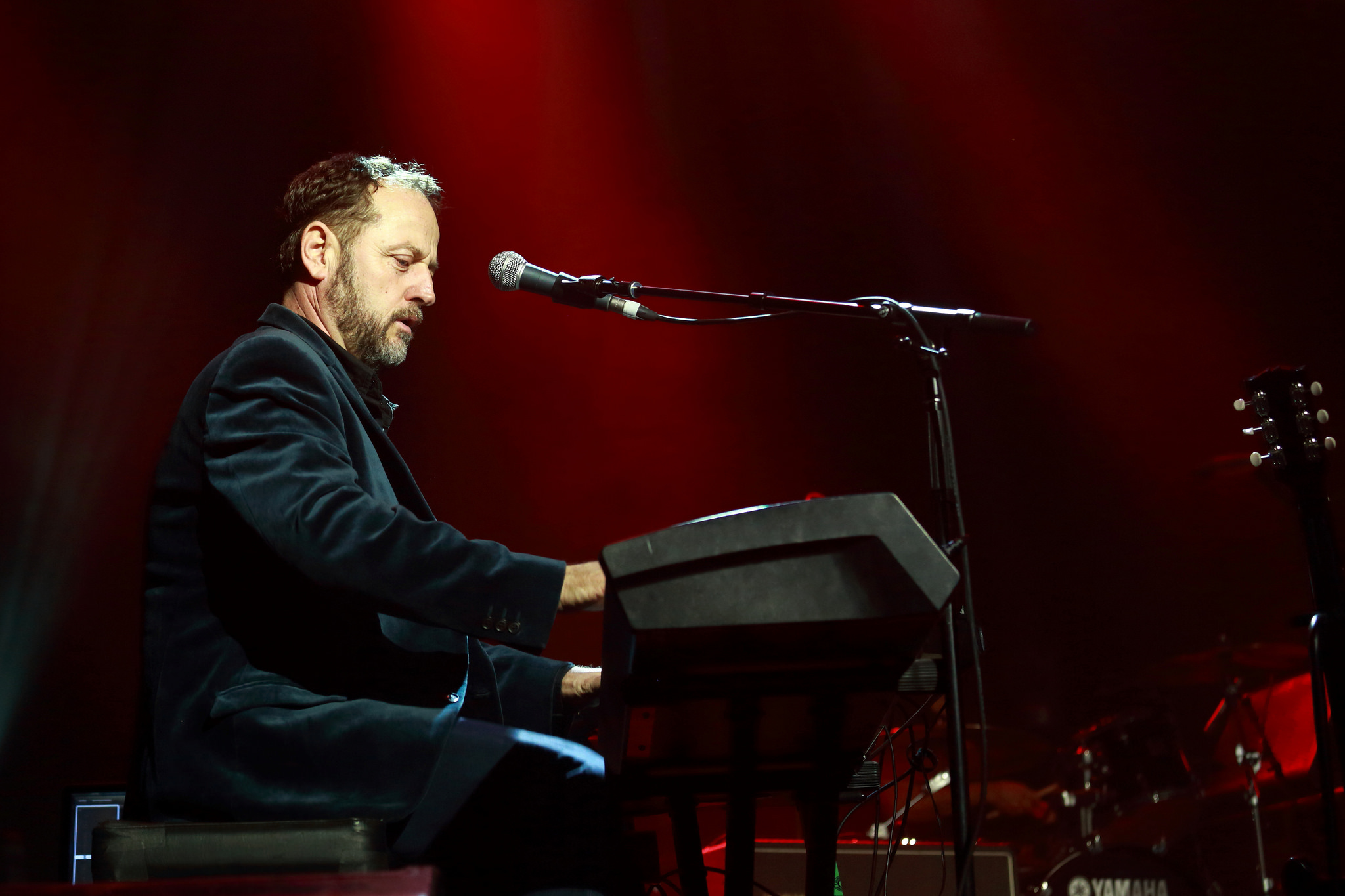
- McAll performing with the Black Sorrows at Byron Bay Bluesfest, Easter in 2014

Background information
- Origin: Melbourne, Victoria, Australia
- Occupation: Musician
- Instrument: Piano

John McAll is an Australian pianist, composer, arranger and producer, with experience ranging from jazz, pop, blues, rock contemporary classical, afrobeat and theatre.

== Early life and education ==
McAll graduated with a Bachelor of Arts from the University of Melbourne, Faculty of Victorian College of the Arts and Melbourne Conservatorium of Music in 1983.

== Career ==
McAll launched his debut recording as band leader and composer in June 2009 with Black Money on independent label Audacity Media. The band performed at the Wangaratta Festival of Jazz in October that year, and the album was rated in the top albums of the year by Herald-Sun jazz reviewer Roger Mitchell in December.

As a founding member of the David Chesworth Ensemble, McAll has performed internationally in New York City, Slovenia, extensively through the UK, South Africa and Paris, France. He regularly tours Australia and Europe with The Black Sorrows; appears at music festivals with the Public Opinion Afro Orchestra; performs and writes for Eugene Hamilton and the Money; and performs live jazz regularly in Melbourne with Brian Abrahams' District 6, the B# Big Band, Nichaud Fitzgibbon, Alyce Platt, Rebecca Barnard, and Jane Clifton.

He has worked with Gregory Porter, Wycliffe Gordon, Ross Wilson, David Campbell, Debra Byrne, Renee Geyer, Nina Ferro, Ruby Carter and Vince Jones, as well as playing international concert stages with The David Chesworth Ensemble, Vika Bull and The Black Sorrows. For a time he was part of 1980s pop group I'm Talking.

In August 2012 John McAll joined forces with Joe Camilleri to create a big band called The Voodoo Sheiks. He subsequently became keyboardist for Camilleri's band The Black Sorrows.

== Selected discography ==
- The Way we Do Business - The Black Sorrows - 2024 Co Producer chief arranger
- Pass The Rainbow-Black Money composer 2023
- St Georges Rd The Black Sorrows- Piano, Organ. 2021
- Digital Afrika Asiko Keyboards Synth-
- Zedsix The shape of Jazz - piano BELL AWARD (best production) 2021
- Standing Strong – Ray Dimakarri Dixon – NIMA Nomination
- Secular- John McAll Composer 2018
- Naming and Blaming – The Public Opinion Afro Orchestra 2018
- Digital Afrika – keyboards, Synth 2018
- Citizen John – The Black sorrows – co-producer 2018
- United in Swing – The B Sharp Big band – Produced by Wycliffe Gordon
- Faithful Satellite – The Black Sorrows- Co Producer 2016
- Endless Sleep – The Black Sorrows- Co Producer 2015 – ARIA Nomination
- Certified Blue – The Black Sorrows-Co Producer 2013 – ARIA Nomination
- Alter Ego – John McAll composer 2012
- Crooked Little Thoughts – Joe Camilleri 2012
- Tekopia – the David Chesworth Ensemble 2012
- Do Anything Go Anywhere – The Public Opinion Afro Orchestra 2010 – ARIA Nomination
- Black Money – John McAll composer 2009
- 5 Decades of Cool (DVD) – Ross Wilson 2008
- Tributary - Ross Wilson 2007
- Bakelite Radio Volume IV – Joe Camilleri 2007
- Roarin' Town – Black Sorrows 2006
- Music To See Through David Chesworth Ensemble – Winner APRA Classical Award 2006
- Go Bongo, Go Wild – Ross Wilson 2003
- Badlands – David Chesworth Ensemble2001
- 2001 Wicked Voice includes excerpts from Lacuna and The Two Executioners (Chesworth/Horton), ABC Classics
- Exotica suite – David Chesworth Ensemble 1997- ARIA Nomination
- One Day Spent – Vince Jones 1990
- Lovetown – Stephen Cummings 1988

== Touring and performance highlights ==
- 2019 Shanghai Mimi Sydney Festival Composer, Musical Director
- 2018 UK Major Theatres Tour, At Last the Etta James Story featuring Vika Bull
- 2018 Black Money Secular Launch Birds Basement Melbourne
- 2017 UK/ European tour Black Sorrows
- 2017 UK tour At Last the Etta James story, featuring Vika Bull- Musical Director/Arranger
- 2015 UK/ European tour Black Sorrows
- 2015 Lets Get It on the Life and music of Marvin Gaye with Lloyd Cele Johannesburg Theatre May 2015
- 2014 Here Comes the Night With the Melbourne Symphony Orchestra Conductor Composer/Arranger
- 2014 Here Comes the Night With the Sydney Symphony Orchestra Conductor Composer/Arranger
- 2014 Trondheim Blues Festival Norway with The Black Sorrows
- 2014 Byron Bay Blues Festival Black Sorrows
- 2014 Byron Bay Blues Festival with Garland Jeffries
- 2014 Lets Get It On, The life and Music of Marvin Gaye Musical Director/Arranger
- 2014 The Songs of James Bond Athanaeum Music Supervisor/Arranger
- 2013 Here Comes The Night, Van Morrison Homage featuring Joe Camilleri, Vince Jones, Vika Bull, The Silo String Quartet Musical Director/Arranger
- 2013 At Last the Etta James story featuring Vika Bull Musical Director/Arranger
- 2012 Gregory Porter headline Wangaratta Jazz festival John McALL Quartet
- 2012 Gregory Porter November Australian tour with the John McALL Quartet
- 2012 Black Money Alter ego CD launch at Bennetts Lane with Julien Wilson and Nui Moon
- 2012 Black Money performs Alter Ego at the Stonnington Jazz Festival
- 2011 Byron Bay Blues and Roots Festival with the Public Opinion Afro Orchestra
- 2010 Falls Festival with The Public Opinion Afro Orchestra
- 2009 Performances at Melbourne Recital Centre
- 2009 Black Money at Wangaratta Jazz Festival
- 2009 Black Money CD launch Bennetts Lane
- 2009 Five Decades of Cool, Ross Wilson, Byron Bay Blues and Roots festival
- 2009 Five Decades of Cool, Ross Wilson, Palais Theater Melbourne Musical Director
- 2008 Performances in Sydney, Brisbane & on ABC TV Sunday Arts DCE
- 2007 The Big Chill Festival, Ledbury Castle, England DCE
- 2007 Paris Quartier d'Ete Festival France DCE
- 2006 Performance at Classical Music Awards Sydney (Award winner for Instrumental Work of the Year for Panopticon DCE)
- 2005 Music to See Through CD launch performances in Melbourne and Sydney DCE
- 2003 Performances in Ljubljana, Slovenia. Performance at the AFI Awards broadcast nationally on ABC TV DCE
- 2002 Performance with Nick Cave and the Bad Seeds at the Forum, Melbourne DCE
- 2001 BAM Next Wave Festival DCE
- 2001 Bang on a Can Marathon, New York and Kennedy Centre, Washington DCE.
- 2001 Australian East Coast tour including "10 Days on the Island" Festival DCE
- 2000 ABC TV Arts Show Special "Live at the Night Cat" DCE
- 1999 Live-to air-concert, New Music Show, ABC Classic FM DCE
- 1997 Melbourne International Festival of the Arts
- 1996 Port Fairy Spring Music Festival
- 1995 Melbourne International Festival of the Arts
- 1995 Winterarts, Victorian Arts Centre
- 1994 Sydney Spring Festival of Music DCE
- 1994 The Two Executioners- Chamber made opera- AGE PERFORMING ARTS AWARD
- 1992 The Cars that ate Paris -Chamber made Opera
- 1992 Lacuna, music: David Chesworth- Chamber made opera
- 1992 Wendy Harmer Love gone Wrong Australian tour
- 1989 Adelaide Festival Vince Jones
- 1986 Australian National tour with "Im Talking"
- 1983 performance of Brian Browns Wildflowers with the VCA Symphony Orchestra
