= Woodstock Studios =

Recording studio in Melbourne, Australia

Woodstock Studios is a recording studio located in Balaclava, Melbourne. The studio was established in 1994 by Australian musician Joe Camilleri, leader of Jo Jo Zep & The Falcons and the Black Sorrows, and is now owned by record producer and engineer Richard Stolz. It has been used by many leading artists, including Augie March, John Butler Trio, the Cat Empire, Saskwatch, Tash Sultana, Julia Stone, Milky Chance, the Paper Kites and Paul Kelly.
