= Food in the Belly =

Studio album by Xavier Rudd
- Released: 28 October 2005
- Studio: Lemonloaf Studios, Vancouver
- Genre: Folk, blues, indie folk
- Label: Salt X/Universal Music Australia
- Producer: Xavier Rudd, Todd Simko

Xavier Rudd chronology
| Good Spirit (2005) | Food in the Belly (2005) | White Moth (2007) |

Professional ratings
Review scores
| Source | Rating |
|---|---|
| AllMusic | 3.5/5 stars |

Food in the Belly is the third studio album by Xavier Rudd, released in October 2005. It peaked at No. 16 on the ARIA Albums Chart, and reached the top 100 in Belgium and Netherlands. It earned Rudd a nomination for Best Blues and Roots Album at the ARIA Music Awards of 2006 ceremony, but lost to the Audreys' Between Last Night and Us.

== Track listing ==
All tracks are written by Xavier Rudd, except as noted.

| No. | Title | Length |
|---|---|---|
| 1. | "Letter" | 4:12 |
| 2. | "Messages" | 4:02 |
| 3. | "Pockets of Peace" | 4:10 |
| 4. | "Energy Song" | 5:04 |
| 5. | "Fortune Teller" | 3:27 |
| 6. | "The Mother" | 3:15 |
| 7. | "Food in the Belly" | 2:40 |
| 8. | "My Missing" | 3:00 |
| 9. | "Manã" | 2:11 |
| 10. | "Connie's Song" | 2:14 |
| 11. | "Famine" (F. Hibbert) | 3:18 |
| 12. | "Generation Fade" | 3:53 |
| 13. | "24 September 1999" | 6:09 |

== Charts ==
| Chart (2005–2006) | Peak position |
|---|---|
| Australian Albums (ARIA) | 29 |
| Belgian Albums (Ultratop Flanders) | 97 |
| Dutch Albums (Album Top 100) | 56 |
| UK Download (OCC) | 35 |

== Certifications ==
| Region | Certification | Certified units/sales |
|---|---|---|
| Australia (ARIA) | Gold | 35,000^{^} |
^{^} Shipments figures based on certification alone.
