= 'Til My Tears Roll Away =

Studio album by the Audreys
- Released: 14 March 2014
- Label: ABC Music
- Producer: Shane O'Mara

The Audreys chronology
Collected (2012)	'Til My Tears Roll Away (2014)

'Til My Tears Roll Away is the fourth studio album by Australian blues/roots band, the Audreys. The album was produced by Shane O'Mara who had produced the previous three albums by the band. 'Til My Tears Roll Away was released in March 2014 and peaked at number 32 on the ARIA Charts. The album was preceded by the lead single "My Darlin' Girl" in January 2014.

Greg Moskovitch from Music Feeds said "The new album is a grittier record than the pair's previous releases, with the bulk of the material recorded over a few days at Adelaide's Mixmasters studio using aged equipment."

At the ARIA Music Awards of 2014, the album was nominated for Best Blues and Roots Album; the fourth time the group has been nominated in this category, however lost to John Butler Trio for Flesh & Blood.

== Reception ==
Ali Birnie from Beat Magazine said "Featuring sweet blues folk tones that the Audreys are best known for, 'Til My Tears Roll Away also showcases a new-found rock edge to their sound."

Greg Elliott from In Daily said "The Audreys' much-anticipated fourth album won't disappoint their fans" saying "The vocals, while melodic and beautiful, have a haunting, mournful edge which reflects the fact that the songs are often about unsuccessful love. The choruses are catchy and you soon find yourself singing along." In conclusion Elliot said "'Til My Tears Roll Away is quite an achievement, from the opening song, the tone of the album has a sense of loss and of love not running smoothly, but the essential underlying philosophy is 'that's how it goes' and, despite The Audreys' country-rock roots, there is less of an attitude of 'you done me wrong' and more of 'pick yourself up, carry on and keep strong'".

== Track listing ==
1. "My Darlin' Girl" - 2:58
2. "Baby, Are You There" - 3:53
3. "Keep Your Company" - 4:09
4. "Ballad for the Fallen" - 4:30
5. "Roll Away" - 3:49
6. "Comfort Me" - 3:34
7. "Bring the Stars Out" - 4:38
8. "Lady Luck" - 4:25
9. "Come On Back to Bed" - 3:15
10. "Why Must I Wait" - 4:47
11. "I Can't Sleep" - 2:50
12. "Love Has a Way of Unravelling" - 6:25

== Charts ==
Chart (2014)	Peak position
Australian Albums (ARIA)	32

== Personnel ==
- Taasha Coates - vocal and keys
- Tristan Goodall - guitars
- Shane O'Mara - guitars, arrangements and backing vocals
- Ben Weisner - drums and percussion
- Brett Canning - bass and backing vocals
