= The Revelators =

Australian blues rock band

- Origin: Melbourne, Victoria, Australia
- Genres: Blues, rock, R&B, soul, zydeco
- Years active: 1989–present
- Labels: Demon Records, Head Records
- Spinoff of: The Black Sorrows
- Members: Joe Camilleri 1989–1992, 2000–2002 (periodically) James Black 1989–1992, 2000–2002 (periodically) Joe Creighton 1989–1992, 2000–2002 (periodically)
- Past members: Peter Luscombe (1989–1992), Jeff Burstin (1990–1992), Nicky Bomba (2000–2002), Ed Bates (2000–2002), James Black (2000–2002)

The Revelators (also known as "The Delta Revelators") is an Australian blues rock band formed in 1989 by Joe Camilleri, James Black, Joe Creighton and Peter Luscome. Jeff Burstin joined in 1990. In Camilleri's own words, their desire was to "blow out the serious days' work with people who shared the same interest in music and who simply wanted to play it".

The band is a side project of The Black Sorrows as all members were part of The Black Sorrows at the time of formation. The Revelators' sound was a return to early Black Sorrows sound: playing largely R&B-oriented cover songs.

The band released three studio albums and a live DVD between 1991 and 2002. A greatest hits was released in 2012.

The band received two ARIA Award nominations; both for Best Blues and Roots Album, in 2001 and 2003.

== History ==
The band was an offshoot of The Black Sorrows. Original members Joe Camilleri (vocals, guitar, sax), James Black (guitars, keys), Jeff Burstin (guitars, mandolin), Joe Creighton (bass) and Peter Luscombe (drums) were all also simultaneously members of The Black Sorrows, an Australian blues and roots band that had released five studio albums in the 1980s.

"The Delta Revelators", as they were originally known, were a Black Sorrows side project in the late 1980s to play gigs and relax after more serious studio work. The response from Melbourne audiences led them to regular sessions at ID's (now The Continental) and the Botanical Hotel which in turn led to fans requesting an album. The band recorded Amazing stories – a collection of roots based covers in 1991. Also guesting on the album were most of the other members of The Black Sorrows, including violinist Jen Anderson and vocalists Linda and Vika Bull. The album was re-released in March 1993 as a 2-CD pack with The Black Sorrows' Better Times and it peaked at number 14 on the ARIA Charts.

A near ten-year hiatus then ensued while the group members were engaged with other musical commitments.

In early 2000, a reconstituted version of the group was assembled, now featuring Camilleri, Creighton, Black, drummer Nicky Bomba, and (as an adjunct member) Ed Bates on pedal steel. In four days, they recorded a second studio album titled The Adventures of The Amazing Revelators. the album was a mix of blues and roots covers and original material. The album was released in March 2000.

In November 2001, a live DVD titled Floating Bridge: Live at the Basement was released. It originally aired on ABC TV in December 2001. The line-up for this release was Camilleri, Black, Creighton, Luscombe and guitarist Claude Carranza.

In September 2002, the band -- now consisting of Camilleri, Creighton and Black with new drummer Tony Floyd -- released a third studio album titled, The Revelators. Session players on the album included Ed Bates, Kerryn Tolhurst, Jane Clifton, Shane O'Mara, and others.

In July 2012, the band released Floating Bridge: Live at the Basement as a digital-only live album.

In August 2012, the band reunited for three special afternoon shows in Melbourne at the newly launched venue the Flying Saucer Club. They celebrated with the release of The Best Of... The Revelators.

== Members ==
- Joe Camilleri (vocals, saxophone, guitar)
- James Black (keyboards)
- Joe Creighton (bass, vocals)
- Jeff Burstin (guitar)
- Peter Luscombe (drums)
- Nicky Bomba (drums, percussion, backing vocals)
- Tony Floyd (drums)
- Ed Bates (guitar)
- James Black (piano, organ, clarinet, guitar, mandolin)

== Discography ==
=== Studio albums ===
- Amazing Stories (1991, Sony Music Australia)
  - Better Times (by The Black Sorrows) / Amazing Stories (by The Revelators) (1993, CBS Records) – No. 14 AUS
- The Adventures of The Amazing Revelators (2000, Head Records)
- The Revelators (2002, Head Records)

=== DVD/Live albums ===
- Floating Bridge: Live at the Basement (2001 – DVD; 2012 – digital download)

=== Compilations ===
- The Best Of... The Revelators (Head Records) (2012)

=== Singles ===
List of singles, with selected chart positions
| Title | Year | Peak chart positions | Album |
| Title | Year | AUS | Album |
|---|---|---|---|
| "What Does It Take (To Win Your Love)" | 1992 | 81 | Amazing Stories |
