= Short fuse =

Short fuse and similar may refer to:

- Short Fuse Blues, 1990 debut album by Australian blues singer and guitarist Dave Hole
- Short-Fuze (G.I. Joe), a fictional character in the G.I. Joe universe
- "Short Fuse", another name for Good to Go (film) 1986
- "Short Fuse" (1972), sixth episode of the first season of TV series Columbo

== See also ==
- Fuse (disambiguation)
- Fuze
