= Sometimes the Stars =

Studio album by the Audreys
- Released: 8 October 2010
- Label: ABC Music
- Producer: Shane O'Mara

The Audreys chronology
When the Flood Comes (2008)	Sometimes the Stars (2010)	Collected (2012)

Sometimes the Stars is the third studio album by Australian blues/roots band, the Audreys. The album was released on 8 October 2010 and peaked at number 28 on the ARIA Charts. The album features the contributions from acclaimed jazz pianist Paul Grabowsky, former John Butler Trio drummer Michael Barker and vocals from Tim Rogers.

At the ARIA Music Awards of 2011, the album won Best Blues and Roots Album; the third time the band had won this award in as many nominations.

== Background and release ==
After the release of When the Flood Comes in 2008, band members Cameron Goodall and Michael Green left for other musical projects, leaving Taasha Coates and Tristan Goodall as a duo. Coates said the departure came without "bitter sentiments" saying "They're lovely boys, but Tristan and I found that once we got into the studio to record, it felt really liberating because we could really free up the arrangements and have different instruments on them and get in different guests, so it ended up being a really positive thing."

Prior to the writing of Sometimes the Stars, Coates embarked on a backpacking trip across India. Coates said "I went for a five-week holiday with my partner – I used to do a lot of travel when I was younger. I've done a lot of travel with the band, but it's so different 'cause you have to lug around your shoes and your nice frocks and make-up. I wanted to travel with one pair of jeans, one pair of shoes and a sleeping bag – it was just a really nice thing to do."

A few months later, and after some writing sessions, Coates and Goodall set off on a tour as a duo, road-testing some of the songs that would eventually end up on the album. Coates said "We've taken our time writing this record... we felt really rushed writing the second record, so we really wanted to give ourselves a bit of time. The heart of the band's always been Tristan and I, so I think it's more honest, in a way, to bring it back to the two of us." Coates recorded her vocals in single takes so as to capture the spontaneity of their live performance.

In early 2011, Ari Gibson and Jason Pamment released an official music video animation for the album's title track.

== Track listing ==
1. "Comfort Me" - 3:37
2. "I'll Take What's Mine" - 4:08
3. "Troubles Somehow" - 3:31
4. "Poorhouse" - 3:37
5. "Monster" (Part II) - 3:32
6. "Falling Down" - 4:20
7. "Sometimes the Stars" - 4:32
8. "Two States Away" - 5:00
9. "Little Molly" - 4:44
10. "Lonesome Valley" - 3:46

Bonus Disc

1. "Banjo & Violin"
2. "Small Things"
3. "Poorhouse"
4. "Comfort Me"

== Charts ==
Chart (2010)	Peak position
Australian Albums (ARIA)	28
