= C. W. Stoneking =

Australian singer-songwriter (born 1974)

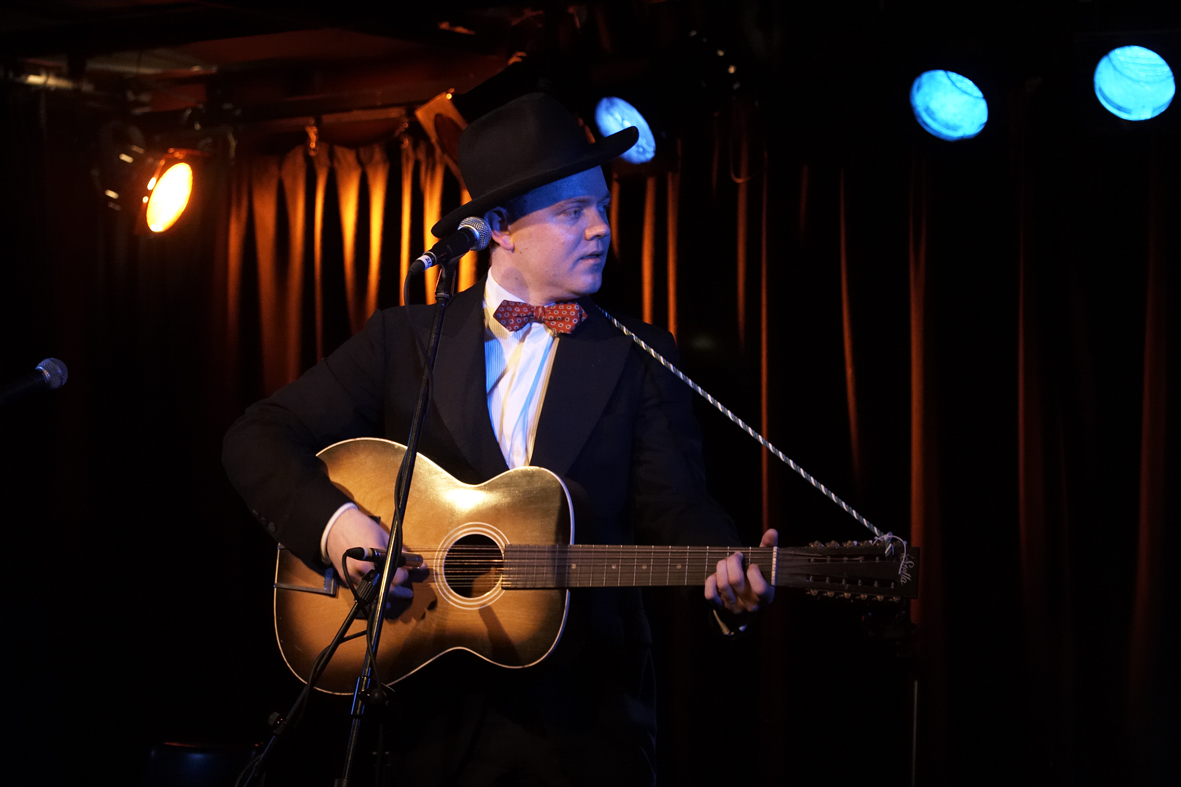

Background information
- Born: Christopher William Stoneking; 15 March 1974 (age 52); Katherine, Northern Territory, Australia
- Genres: Blues, country blues, vaudeville blues
- Occupations: Musician, singer-songwriter
- Instruments: Singing, guitar, banjo
- Years active: 1985–present
- Labels: Low Transit Industries, King Hokum, Voodoo Rhythm, Hillgrass Bluebilly
- Website: cwstoneking.com

Christopher William Stoneking (born 15 March 1974) is an Australian blues singer-songwriter, guitarist and banjo player. At the ARIA Music Awards of 2009 Jungle Blues won Best Blues and Roots Album; he was also nominated for Best Male Artist, Breakthrough Artist – Album, Best Independent Release and Best Cover Art. Gon' Boogaloo peaked at No. 17 on the ARIA Albums Chart and won at the 2015 ARIA Music Awards for Best Blues & Roots Album.

== Early life ==
Christopher William Stoneking was born in Katherine, Northern Territory, in 1974, the son of Billy Marshall Stoneking and author Paty Marshall-Stace.

== Career ==
In 2005, Stoneking recorded an album of original blues compositions titled King Hokum. The album was received with great critical acclaim in the Australian media after its release in 2006. In 2006, Stoneking formed his backing band, the Primitive Horn Orchestra, with whom he still performs. The current line-up is James Clark (tuba, double bass), Stephen Grant (cornet), Stu Barker (trombone) and Johnny Machin (drums).

In 2006, radio presenter Tim Ritchie chose King Hokum as his album of the year on Radio National's Breakfast program. Radio National also presented his February 2007 Australia-wide tour. King Hokum was nominated for the Best Blues/Roots Album in the ARIA Music Awards of 2007. It won the Best Independent Blues Release award in the 2007 AIR Awards (Australian Independent Record Industry Awards).

In 1999, Stoneking independently released two albums recorded in 1998.

King Hokum was released in 2005, his third album, but first of original compositions. On 20 October 2008, Stoneking released Jungle Blues, his second album of original compositions, which peaked at No. 45 on the ARIA Albums Chart. Jungle Blues won Best Blues and Roots Album, and was nominated for Best Independent Release, Best Male Artist and Best Album Cover Art at the ARIA Music Awards of 2009. At the fourth annual AIR Awards held on 22 November 2009, Stoneking was nominated for Best Independent Album, Best Independent Blues/ Roots Album, and Independent Artist of the Year, with Jungle Blues winning the award for Best Independent Blues/ Roots Album. Jungle Blues was also shortlisted in the 2008 Australian Music Prize. He appeared on Later... with Jools Holland on 5 October 2010, playing " Jungle Blues" and "Jungle Lullaby".

In 2013, Stoneking voice acted in Tome of the Unknown, in the part of John Crops, which was the precursor to the mini series Over The Garden Wall.

Stoneking's next album, Gon' Boogaloo, was released on 17 October 2014. It peaked at No. 17 on the ARIA Albums Chart. At the 2015 ARIA Music Awards, Gon' Boogaloo won Best Blues & Roots Album.

Stoneking appeared on American singer-songwriter Jack White's third studio album, Boarding House Reach, which was released on 23 March 2018.

== Discography ==
=== Albums ===
List of studio albums, with selected details and chart positions
Title	Details	Peak chart positions
Title	Details	AUS
C.W. Stoneking	Released: 1999; Label: C.W. Stoneking; Format: CD	—
C.W. Stoneking & The Blue Tits	Released: 1999; Label: King Hokum (KHR-000); Format: CD	—
King Hokum	Released: March 2005; Label: King Hokum (KHR-001); Format: CD	—
Mississippi & Piedmont Blues 1927-41	Released: 2006; Label: King Hokum (521-e271); Format: CD	—
Jungle Blues	Released: 20 October 2008; Label: King Hokum (KHR-002); Format: CD, download	45
Gon' Boogaloo	Released: 7 October 2014; Label: King Hokum (KHR-003); Format: CD, LP, download	17

== Awards and nominations ==
=== AIR Awards ===
The Australian Independent Record Awards (commonly known informally as AIR Awards) is an annual awards night to recognise, promote and celebrate the success of Australia's Independent Music sector.

Year	Nominee / work	Award	Result
2007	King Hokum	Best Independent Blues and Roots Album	Won
2009	Jungle Blues	Best Independent Blues and Roots Album	Won
2009	Jungle Blues	Best Independent Album	Nominated
2009	himself	Best Independent Artist	Nominated
2015	Gon' Boogaloo	Best Independent Blues and Roots Album	Won

=== ARIA Awards ===
The Australian Recording Industry Association Music Awards (commonly known informally as ARIA Music Awards or ARIA Awards) is an annual series of awards nights celebrating the Australian music industry, put on by the Australian Recording Industry Association (ARIA).

Year	Nominee / work	Award	Result
2007	King Hokum	Best Blues & Roots Album	Nominated
2009	Jungle Blues	Best Blues & Roots Album	Won
2009	Jungle Blues	Best Male Artist	Nominated
2009	Jungle Blues	Best Cover Art	Nominated
2009	Jungle Blues	Best Independent Release	Nominated
2015	Gon' Boogaloo	Best Blues & Roots Album	Won

=== Australian Music Prize ===
The Australian Music Prize (the AMP) is an annual award of $30,000 given to an Australian band or solo artist in recognition of the merit of an album released during the year of award. The commenced in 2005.

Year	Nominee / work	Award	Result
2008	Jungle Blues	Australian Music Prize	Nominated
2014	Gon' Boogaloo	Australian Music Prize	Nominated

=== Music Victoria Awards ===
The Music Victoria Awards, are an annual awards night celebrating Victorian music. They commenced in 2005 (although nominee and winners are unknown from 2005 to 2012).

Year	Nominee / work	Award	Result
2015	himself	Best Male Artist	Won
2016	himself	Best Male Artist	Won
2016	himself	Best Regional Act	Nominated

=== National Live Music Awards ===
The National Live Music Awards (NLMAs) are a broad recognition of Australia's diverse live industry, celebrating the success of the Australian live scene. The awards commenced in 2016.

Year	Nominee / work	Award	Result
2017	C.W. Stoneking	Live Blues and Roots Act of the Year	Nominated
2018	C.W. Stoneking	Live Blues and Roots Act of the Year	Nominated
