= Under the Spell =

Studio album by Dave Hole
- Released: April 1999
- Studio: Planet Studios, Western Australia
- Label: Black Cat Records / Shock Records

Dave Hole chronology
Ticket to Chicago (1997)	Under the Spell (1999)	Outside Looking In (2001)

Under the Spell is the seventh studio album, by Australian musician Dave Hole. At the ARIA Music Awards of 1999, the album won the ARIA Award for Best Blues and Roots Album.

== Reception ==
Professional ratings
Review scores
Source	Rating
AllMusic	3/5 stars

Michael B. Smith from AllMusic said "With Under the Spell, Australian guitarist Dave Hole and his veteran backup band manage to lasso in all of the energy from their live concerts, while under the roof of a usually antiseptic recording studio environment... Under the Spell combines excellent acoustic foundations, topped with blistering slide work and power-soaked vocals, to provide one of the finest blues albums of the year. The CD should be required listening for all fans and students of the slide guitar, as well as connoisseurs of the blues in general."

Billboard (magazine) wrote "Slide guitar fanatics will have their brains blown out by this Australian fret-melter ... Remarkably inventive, technically unusual overhand slide work that separates him from the common pack of Elmore James worshippers ... prepare to hear your jaw hitting the floor."

== Track listing ==
- all songs written by Dave Hole except where noted.
1. "Holding Pattern" - 4:49
2. "Demolition Man" - 5:24
3. "Run with Me" - 4:50
4. "Cold Women With Warm Hearts" (Mack Rice) - 5:12
5. "More Love, Less Attitude" (Chris Miller) - 4:18
6. "Blues in the Truth" - 3:28
7. "Chicken Stuff" (Eddie Shuler, Hop Wilson) - 2:53
8. "Don't Say Goodbye" - 3:58
9. "Yes Or No" - 4:27
10. "I See My Baby" (Elmore James) - 3:17
11. "Short Memory" - 3:49
12. "Lost At Sea" - 2:47
13. "Guitar Man" - 3:42
14. "Bird's Eye Blues 4:55
15. "Too Old to Rock'n'Roll" (Tom Larsen) - 3:27
16. "I've Got to Go" - 2:46
