= Soul Witness =

Studio album by Matt Walker with Ashley Davies
- Released: June 2000
- Studio: ABC Southbank
- Length: 56:29
- Label: W.Minc Productions
- Producer: Graham Lee

Matt Walker albums chronology
I Listen to the Night (1997)	Soul Witness (2000)	Live At The Continental (2001)

Soul Witness is a collaborative studio album, by Australian musicians Matt Walker with Ashley Davies, released in June 2000. At the ARIA Music Awards of 2000, the album won the ARIA Award for Best Blues and Roots Album.

== Track listing ==
CD1

1. "Deepest Valley" - 3:08
2. "You Put a Spell On Me" - 5:04
3. "Black Rose" - 4:43
4. "Green & Grey" - 5:43
5. "Dirty Fog" - 6:32
6. "Victims Highway" - 4:30
7. "In the Undertow" - 2:31
8. "Train Driver" - 3:51
9. "Evil Feelings" - 5:01
10. "Room to Move" - 6:04
11. "Second Hand Luck" - 6:00
12. "Party Town" - 3:12

CD2 (Live At The Continental)

1. "Don't Need Sunshine"
2. "Deepest Valley" (Live)
3. "Dirty Fog" (Live)
4. "Room to Move" (Live)
5. "This Broken Sky" (Live)
6. "Second Hand Luck" (Live)
7. 'All By Myself" (Live)

== Charts ==
Chart performance for Soul Witness
Chart (1995)	Peak position
Australian Albums (ARIA)	199
