= Jungle Blues =

Studio album by C. W. Stoneking
- Released: 28 October 2008
- Recorded: March 2008
- Genre: Blues, Country blues, Vaudeville blues, Calypso
- Length: 40:18
- Label: King Hokum
- Producer: C.W. Stoneking

C. W. Stoneking chronology
King Hokum (2006)	Jungle Blues (2008)	Gon' Boogaloo (2014)

Professional ratings
Review scores
Source	Rating
Record Collector	4/5 stars

Jungle Blues is the fourth album by Australian Blues musician C. W. Stoneking.

At the ARIA Music Awards of 2009, he was nominated for Best Blues and Roots Album, Best Independent Release, Best Male Artist and Best Cover Art, eventually winning 'Best Blues and Roots Album' for Jungle Blues.

At the AIR Awards of 2009, Stoneking was nominated for Best Independent Album, Best Independent Blues/Roots Album, and Independent Artist of the Year, with Jungle Blues winning the award for Best Independent Blues/Roots Album. Jungle Blues was also shortlisted in the 2008 Australian Music Prize.

== Track listing ==
All tracks written by C.W. Stoneking, except Track 4 by Wilmoth Houdini.

1. "Jungle Blues" – 3:57
2. "Talkin' Lion Blues" – 4:32
3. "Jungle Lullaby" – 4:49
4. "Brave Son Of America" – 3:40
5. "Jailhouse Blues" – 4:33
6. "Housebound Blues" – 3:37
7. "I Heard The Marchin' Of The Drum" – 3:53
8. "The Love Me Or Die" – 3:51
9. "Early In The Mornin'" – 3:32
10. "The Greatest Liar" – 3:37

== Charts ==
Chart performance for Jungle Blues
Chart (2008)	Peak position
Australian Albums (ARIA)	45
Belgian Albums (Ultratop Flanders)	29
Dutch Albums (Album Top 100)	82
