= Mia Dyson =

Australian singer

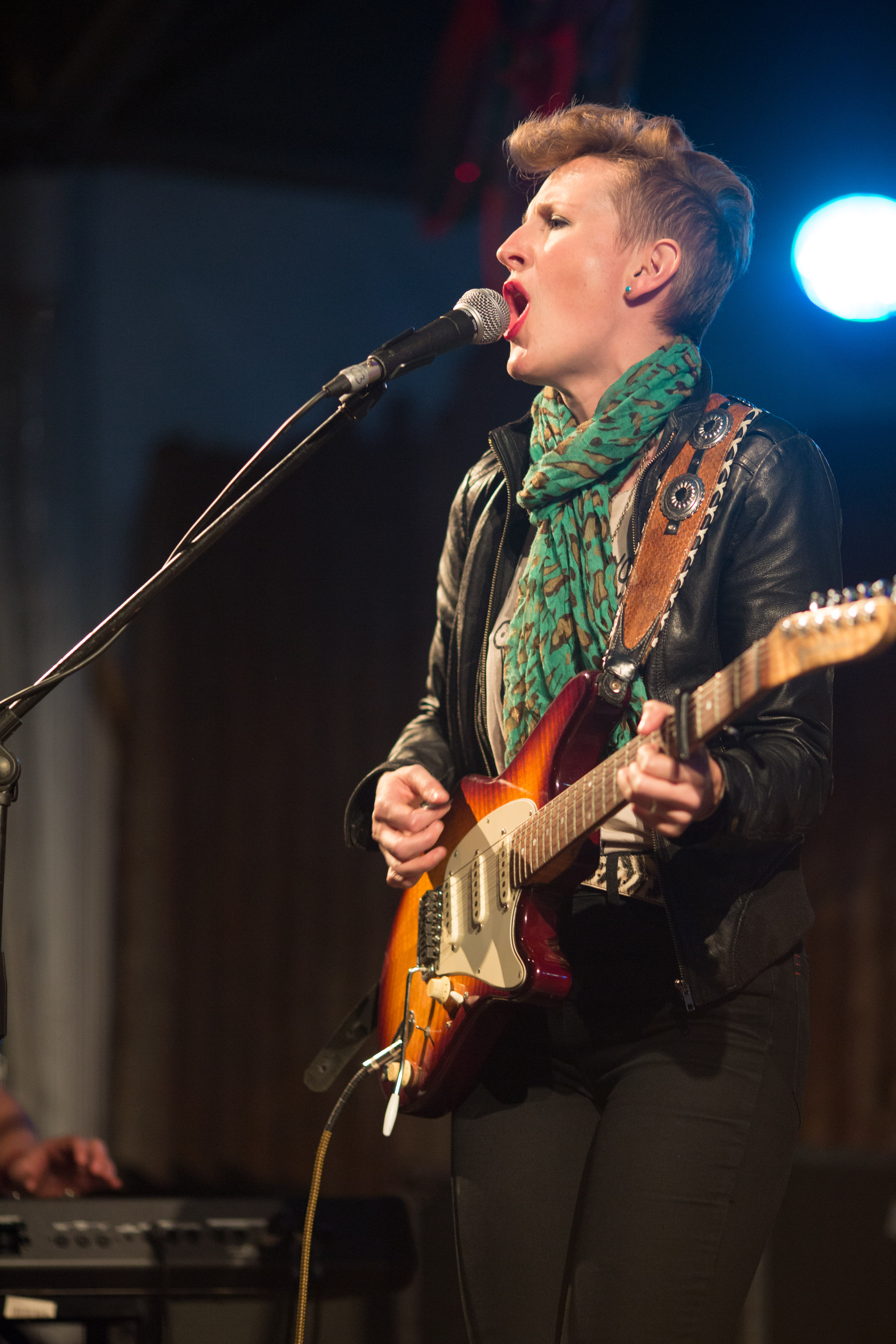
- Performing at The Gum Ball, Hunter Valley, April 2013

Background information
- Born: Mia Celeste Dyson; 1981 (age 44–45); Daylesford, Victoria, Australia
- Origin: Torquay, Victoria, Australia
- Genres: Blues; roots
- Occupation: Musician
- Instruments: Vocals; guitars; harmonica; drums
- Years active: 1999–present
- Labels: Shock; Black Door/MGM
- Website: miadyson.com

Mia Celeste Dyson (born 1981) is an Australian singer, songwriter and guitarist. She has released six studio albums. Her second, Parking Lots, won the ARIA Award for Best Blues and Roots Album at the ARIA Music Awards of 2005. Since 2013, Dyson has concurrently released music under the name Dyson, Stringer & Cloher with Liz Stringer and Jen Cloher.

== Life and career ==
=== 1981–2002: Early life ===
Mia Dyson was born in 1981 in a mud brick home built by her parents near Daylesford. Her father, Jim Dyson, is a blues guitarist and luthier. The family moved to Torquay when she was eight. For secondary schooling she attended Matthew Flinders Girls High School, Geelong. When queried by the Sydney Morning Herald's reporter on how she went from a settled family life, in the Victorian beachside resort town of Torquay to playing and singing blues and roots music, Dyson responded:

"I don't know either, it's a testament to the power of music and how that whole childhood of being played what I consider incredible music seeped into my bloodstream. My parents were always playing the records of Little Feat, Bob Dylan, Ry Cooder, Bonnie Raitt, Neil Young, everything. Torquay is devoid of any artistic pursuits and had I only had that culture I'm sure I would not be playing music. I might have had more luck with the alcohol if I'd been left to the surfing culture."

"I went through my early teenage Nirvana, Pearl Jam obsessions and then I came back to the roots of this stuff and picked up the guitar. And I knew how to play these songs that I'd never learnt because I'd heard them so many times as a kid."

She described her father's hand made guitars:

"I guess now people are impressed how lucky I am to have a dad who makes such beautiful instruments," Dyson says. But as a child she was unaware of their potential. "It was only, 'Oh, don't they look beautiful' when he finished one," she says. "It was only around 16, 17, when I was able to think about the sounds and the different sounds I could get out of the guitars, the amps and pedals, that I got excited."

Dyson played her first gig at a party in Modewarre and followed with shows at the Barwon Club and at the National Hotel in Geelong. She then relocated to Melbourne, where her first residency, in November 2000, was at the Dan O'Connell Hotel, Fitzroy with her backing band comprising Dean Addison on bass guitar and Carl Pannuzzo on drums.

=== 2003–2006: Cold Water and Parking Lots ===
Dyson released her first album, Cold Water, in May 2003 via Black Door Records and distributed by Shock Records. It was produced by Dyson with Lloyd Barratt – her audio engineer and sometime domestic partner. For the album she provided lead vocals, guitars (acoustic, baritone, electric, lap steel) and piano. Her backing band were Daniel Farrugia on drums and Lucas Taranto on bass guitar. The Age's Patrick Donovan opined, "[she] blew audiences away with her powerfully emotive voice and dynamic guitar playing on her debut album Cold Water. But the songwriting was a little one-dimensional."

She supported the album by touring both Australia and internationally: East Coast Blues & Roots Music Festival, West Coast Blues & Roots Festival, Falls Festival, Womadelaide, NXNE (Canada) and Edinburgh Festival (Scotland). At the ARIA Music Awards of 2003 it was nominated for the ARIA Award for Best Blues and Roots Album.

Dyson released her second album, Parking Lots, in April 2005. She produced the album with recording partly occurring in a back yard shed at her grandfather's home in Moonee Ponds. Nick Launay mixed the album and studio musicians included Renée Geyer and Matt Walker. The Sydney Morning Herald's reporter described her sound as "strongly into soulful rock, folk and country." Donovan reflected, "she demonstrates the maturity to let her voice and playing soar. Dyson puts her newfound maturity down to experience and confidence gained from two years on the road, playing everywhere from women's prisons to three months overseas as a solo artist." At the ARIA Music Awards of 2005 she won Best Blues and Roots Album and was nominated for the ARIA Award for Best Female Artist.

In 2006, Dyson toured the United States and Canada, she performed with Frank Zappa's band, The Mothers of Invention, on stage at the Winnipeg Folk Festival, and supported Ani Di Franco in New York's Central Park. In August of that year she was invited by Deborah Conway to take part in the Broad Festival project, with three other Australian female artists, they performed their own and each other's songs. With Dyson and Conway were Melinda Schneider, Kate Miller-Heidke and Ella Hooper. They toured the mainland state and territory capital cities.

=== 2007–2013: The Signal and The Moment ===
In 2007 Dyson supported Eric Clapton during his Australian tour in February to sell out crowds. She also had a guest appearance on Australian hip hop artist Urthboy's second album, The Signal. For her third album, Struck Down, Dyson used Angus Diggs (Jeff Lang, Monkeyboy) on drums and James Haselwood on bass guitar. She co-produced it with Barratt. The Signal was released in August 2007 and it peaked at No. 74 on the ARIA Albums Chart. Em of Soulshine observed, "The result is a superb album with Mia's classic husky roots sound, this time featuring a defining rhythm. Mia has evolved not only as a musician, but as a songwriter too, drawing inspiration from just about everything around her, and this album is sure to please old fans and convert new ones." The artist followed with a tour from September to November.

In 2009 Dyson relocated to Boston to try to break into the American music scene. She toured continuously, playing clubs and festivals across the country and in 2010, moved to Los Angeles. She briefly worked with Dave Stewart (ex-Eurythmics), she felt, "Dave is sort of an eccentric genius character, but we didn't have the same ideas and weren't really on the same page so it wasn't ever going to work, I think." They recorded a track together, "You and Me", which was part of an extended play released in the US in April 2011.

Dyson opened for Stevie Nicks at the Santa Barbara bowl and Lake Tahoe in late 2010 and then opened for Chris Isaak on his national tour.

Dyson worked on her fourth studio album The Moment from late 2011. It was produced by Erin 'Syd' Sidney and Patrick Cupples, and was recorded in Ojai, California. A promotional track from the album, "Tell Me", was released in April 2012. The first single and its video, "When the Moment Comes", was released in July. The Moment was released in August 2012, and it debuted at No. 51 on the ARIA Albums Chart. It was nominated for Best Blues & Roots Album at the ARIA Music Awards of 2012, and provided two more singles, "Pistol" and "Jesse".

In August 2013, Dyson collaborated with Liz Stringer and Jen Cloher and formed Dyson, Stringer & Cloher. The trio released an EP which featured an individual track from each musician. They then took on the road, playing over 40 shows around the country.

=== 2014–2020: Idyllwild and If I Said Only So Far I Take It Back ===
Dyson's fifth studio album, Idyllwild, was released in June 2014. Matthew Fiander of PopMatters felt it was "another solid album from Dyson, and further evidence that the Australian singer can be both comfortable in her own skin and restless enough to push her boundaries." The AU Review's Salmond rated it at 8.8 out of 10 and explained, "another beautiful album full of fun rock tunes as well as returning to her roots with slower bluesy ballads. Despite being her fifth record, she has created another stunning album that reflects her musical integrity and musical talents... [and has] the freedom to explore and challenge herself musically which has created an interesting array of upbeat bluesy-rock songs that intertwine effortlessly with slower bluesy soulful ballads. Her lyrics are more honest and reflective in nature, and this album could be argued to be her most honest yet."

Dyson released her sixth studio album, If I Said Only So Far I Take It Back, in March 2018.

In 2019, Dyson reunited with Stringer and Cloher and the trio recorded an album in eight days at The Loft in Chicago in April 2019 which was released in October 2019 under the title Dyson Stringer Cloher and toured nationally.

=== 2021–present: Tender Heart ===
In 2021 Dyson discovered she had undiagnosed arrhythmia. In February 2024 Dyson released Tender Heart. At the 2024 ARIA Music Awards, it won ARIA Award for Best Blues and Roots Album.

== Discography ==
=== Studio albums ===
Title	Details	Peak chart positions
Title	Details	AUS
Cold Water	Released: May 2003; Label: Black Door (BDR014); Format: CD	—
Parking Lots	Released: April 2005; Label: Black Door (BDR015); Format: CD	—
Struck Down	Released: August 2007; Label: Black Door (BDR016); Format: CD, digital download	74
The Moment	Released: August 2012; Label: Black Door (BDR017); Format: CD, LP, digital download	51
Idyllwild	Released: June 2014; Label: Black Door (BDR018); Format: CD, LP, digital download	—
If I Said Only So Far I Take It Back	Released: March 2018; Label: Single Lock (SL022); Format: CD, LP, digital download, streaming	—
Dyson Stringer Cloher (credited to Dyson Stringer Cloher)	Released: October 2019; Label: Milk! (MILK045); Format: CD, digital download, LP, streaming	—
Tender Heart	Released: 23 February 2024; Label: Mia Dyson; Format: CD, digital download, streaming	—

=== Extended plays ===
Title	Details
You and Me	Released: April 2011 (US only); Label: Format: CD, DD
Dyson Stringer Cloher (credited to Dyson Stringer Cloher)	Released: September 2013; Label: Milk! Records; Format: CD, digital download
Introducing Mia Dyson	Released: 2014; Label: Mia Dyson; Format: DD; Note: 6-track EP, featuring songs from Idyllwild, The Moment and Struck Down.
Right There	Released: February 2016; Label: Mia Dyson; Format: DD
Sings Leonard Cohen	Released: November 2016; Label: Backdoor; Format: DD
Parking Lots Revisited	Released: 2020; Label: Backdoor; Format: DD, streaming

=== Other appearances ===
Title	Artist	Year	Album
"Precious Thing"	Various Artists	2003	The Queenscliff Music Festival ALIVE
"Lonely"	Various Artists	2005	Look Both Ways (soundtrack)
"Can't Let Go"	Various Artists	2006	Like a Version 2
"Choose"	Various Artists	2007	Turning the Tide
"Over Before it Began"	Urthboy	2007	The Signal
"This Magic Moment"	Various Artists	2009	Like a Version 5
"Fruits of My Labour"	Katie Noonan	2014	Songs That Made Me
"Humble"	Various Artists	2017	Scary Pockets
"Being Scared"	Various Artists	2018	The Alchemy of Fire

== Awards ==
=== AIR Awards ===
The Australian Independent Record Awards (commonly known informally as AIR Awards) is an annual awards night to recognise, promote and celebrate the success of Australia's Independent Music sector. They commenced in 2006.

Year	Nominee / work	Award	Result
2013	The Moment	Best Independent Blues and Roots Album	Nominated
2014	Idyllwild	Best Independent Blues and Roots Album	Nominated
2019	If I Said Only So Far I Take It Back	Best Independent Blues and Roots Album	Nominated
2020	Dyson Stringer Cloher (as Dyson Stringer Cloher}	Best Independent Blues and Roots Album or EP	Nominated
2025	Tender Heart	Best Independent Blues and Roots Album or EP	Nominated

=== APRA Awards ===
The APRA Awards are presented annually from 1982 by the Australasian Performing Right Association (APRA), "honouring composers and songwriters". They commenced in 1982.

Year	Nominee / work	Award	Result	Ref.
2013	"When the Moment Comes" (Mia Dyson)	Song of the Year	Nominated	
2015	"When We're Older" (Mia Dyson, Lee Pardini & Erin Sidney)	Song of the Year	Shortlisted	

=== ARIA Music Awards ===
The ARIA Music Awards is an annual awards ceremony that recognises excellence, innovation, and achievement across all genres of Australian music.

Year	Nominee / work	Award	Result
2003	Cold Water	Best Blues & Roots Album	Nominated
2005	Parking Lots	Best Female Artist	Nominated
2005	Parking Lots	Best Blues & Roots Album	Won
2008	Struck Down	Best Blues & Roots Album	Nominated
2012	The Moment	Best Blues & Roots Album	Nominated
2024	Tender Heart	Best Blues & Roots Album	Won

=== EG Awards / Music Victoria Awards ===
The EG Awards (known as Music Victoria Awards since 2013) are an annual awards night celebrating Victorian music. They commenced in 2006.

Year	Nominee / work	Award	Result
2012	"When the Moment Comes"	Best Song	Nominated
2012	Mia Dyson	Best Female	Nominated

=== J Awards ===
The J Awards are an annual series of Australian music awards that were established by the Australian Broadcasting Corporation's youth-focused radio station Triple J. They commenced in 2005.

Year	Nominee / work	Award	Result
2014	herself	Double J Artist of the Year	Won
