= Gon' Boogaloo =

Studio album by C. W. Stoneking
- Released: 7 October 2014
- Studio: Sound Recordings Studios
- Genre: Blues, rock and roll
- Label: King Hokum Records
- Producer: C.W. Stoneking

C. W. Stoneking chronology
Jungle Blues (2008)	Gon' Boogaloo (2014)

Professional ratings
Aggregate scores
Source	Rating
Metacritic	75/100
Review scores
Source	Rating
DownBeat	4/5 stars
SLUG Magazine	Favorable
All About Jazz	3.5/5 stars
Record Collector	4/5 stars
The Independent	Positive

Gon' Boogaloo is the fifth album by Australian blues musician C. W. Stoneking. It was released in October 2014 and peaked at number 17 on the ARIA Charts.

At the ARIA Music Awards of 2015, the album won Best Blues and Roots Album.

At the AIR Awards of 2015, the album won Best Independent Blues and Roots Album.

== Track listing ==
1. "How Long" – 3:14
2. "The Zombie" – 3:53
3. "Get On the Floor" – 3:47
4. "The Thing I Done" – 3:20
5. "Tomorrow Gon' Be Too Late" – 3:06
6. "Mama Got the Blues" – 3:24
7. "Goin' Back South" – 3:31
8. "The Jungle Swing" – 3:16
9. "Good Luck Charm" – 2:45
10. "I'm the Jungle Man" – 3:00
11. "On a Desert Isle" – 4:42
12. "We Gon' Boogaloo" – 3:27

== Charts ==
Chart performance for Gon' Boogaloo
Chart (2014)	Peak position
Australian Albums (ARIA)	17
Belgian Albums (Ultratop Flanders)	85
