= Parking Lots (album) =

Studio album by Mia Dyson
- Released: 11 April 2005
- Recorded: Sing Sing Studios
- Genres: Blues and Roots
- Label: Backdoor/MGM Distribution
- Producers: Mia Dyson, Lloyd Barratt

Mia Dyson chronology
Cold Water (2003)	Parking Lots (2005)	Struck Down (2007)

Parking Lots is the second studio album by Australian blues and roots singer Mia Dyson and was released on 11 April 2005. The first single off the album was "Roll Me Out". The final single off the album, "I Meant Something to You Once", was made available as an exclusive download through iTunes was added to high rotation on Triple J and community, youth radio networks across the country.

All songs on the album were written and produced by Dyson except "Rivers Wide" which was produced with Matt Walker. Parking Lots was co-produced with Lloyd Barratt and mixed by Nick Launay (Lou Reed, Nick Cave, Silverchair).

Parking Lots was recorded at a holiday house in Victoria's Mt Martha with Dyson's backing band of Lucas Taranto (bass) and Daniel Farrugia (drums). Stage two saw the studio move back home to the bungalow in her backyard, where she was joined by special guests: Matt Walker, Steve Hesketh (Jet, Dan Brodie) Carl Panuzzo and Sime Nugent. Later, Renée Geyer added backing vocals during the album's mixing stage at Sing Sing, Melbourne.

Parking Lots won the 2005 ARIA Award for Best Blues and Roots Album; she was also nominated for Best Female Artist.

== Reception ==
Professional ratings
Review scores
Source	Rating
The Age	(positive)

Patrick Donovan of The Age opined, "Playing to prison inmates may be intimidating for some performers, but entertainment-starved inmates can be highly receptive audiences - especially if you're singing the blues... Dyson puts her newfound maturity down to experience and confidence gained from two years on the road, playing everywhere from women's prisons to three months overseas as a solo artist."

SA Blues' David Stoeckel felt, "This is the kind of mix I warm to. It has a dynamic and immediate quality about it as well as a lay back subtlety. The mix allows for the impassioned, moaning, bluesy and slightly slurred vocals to come through clearly. At the same time you are aware of the strength and beauty of the guitar playing. What is generated is an exhilarating, intimate, approachable and engaging sound filled with rich roots and blues rhythms."

== Track listing ==
1. "Roll Me Out" - 4:31
2. "Parking Lots" - 5:21
3. "I Meant Something to You Once" - 4:12
4. "Christmas Island" - 3:36
5. "No Other" - 5:06
6. "Rivers Wide" - 3:34
7. "Dark Time" - 4:14
8. "Little Piece" - 4:03
9. "Choose" - 4:53
10. "Down" - 5:19
11. "Fire Creek" - 3:24
