= Harry Hookey =

- Born: Henry Howlett James Hookey; 6 November 1988 (age 38); Melbourne, Australia
- Origin: Cowwarr, Victoria
- Genres: Roots, Rock

Harry Hookey is a singer-songwriter from Victoria, Australia. His debut album Misdiagnosed was nominated for a 2014 ARIA Award for Best Blues & Roots Album. He is currently part of Desert Alien, a band with his brothers Jack Hookey and Jesse Kidd.

Hookey was educated at Cowwarr Primary School and was School Captain in 2000. Hookey holds degrees in Arts and Law from The University of Melbourne. His father taught him to play guitar at the age of 16, with Hookey starting his music career playing in country pubs in a family band with his father and two brothers. His first gig was at the Cowwarr Cricket Club Hotel.

After moving back to Australia after a stint in Nashville, Tennessee, he lived as a recluse for 3 years in ramshackle farmhouse in central Gippsland working on his musical abilities.

In 2021, he released his sophomore album as harry hook is real "No Snake in the Tree". Due to a record label complication, he can no longer release music as Harry Hookey.

== Discography ==
=== Studio albums ===
Title	Album details
Misdiagnosed	Released: 25 April 2014; Label: Nash Chambers; Format: CD, digital download, streaming

=== Singles ===
Title	Year	Album
"Sometimes"	2013	Misdiagnosed
"Man on Fire"	2014	Misdiagnosed

== Awards and nominations ==
=== ARIA Music Awards ===
The ARIA Music Awards is an annual awards ceremony that recognises excellence, innovation, and achievement across all genres of Australian music.

Year	Nominee / work	Award	Result
2014	Misdiagnosed	Best Blues & Roots Album	Nominated
