= William Crighton =

Australian musician

- William Crighton, 2026

Background information
- Born: Dubbo, Australia
- Genre: Alternative rock
- Years active: 2001–present
- Label: ABC Records
- Website: williamcrightonmusic.com.au

William Crighton performing at the Murwillumbah Citadel, 2026

Clint William Crighton, known professionally as William Crighton (and formerly as Clint Crighton) is an Australian alternative-rock singer songwriter. He won the ARIA Award for Best Blues and Roots Album in 2022.

== Early life ==
William Crighton was born in Dubbo and grew up in small towns around the Riverina, NSW. Crighton began playing live gigs and writing at age 14.

== Career ==
=== 2001–2014: Career beginnings as Clint Crighton ===
Crighton's self-released debut EP Change was released in 2001. This was followed by Laydown in 2004.

Crighton's first overseas trip occurred in 2005 where he completed a three month residency in Beijing blues club "Ice House". In 2006, Crighton travelled to USA and was signed to Fitzgerald Hartley.

For seven years, from 2007 to 2014, Crighton crisscrossed the United States and China, playing music.

In 2008, Crighton fan-financed his first album, asking fans for $100 advance, which bought them a one-in-a-thousand chance to win a ten day trip to Los Angeles to see Crighton recording the album as well as free entrance into Crighton's live shows for the rest of their natural lives, a signed pre-release CD of the album and a membership card suitable for framing.

In 2009, Crighton released, April EP which was followed in March 2011, with the album, This Time of Year.

After being based in Nashville, Tennessee for several years Crighton realised he missed Australia. He said, "I came home with a longing for connection and though music was a part of me I still didn't know how I would be able to do it."

In 2016, Crighton reflected on these years saying, "I was quite green. It felt good at the time, it just never hit home. I was involved in a lot of different projects. It was a good journey and I learned a lot. I left that part of me behind musically because it just didn't feel like me anymore."

=== 2015–present: ABC Music and William Crighton ===
In 2015, Crighton returned to Australia, living in Burrinjuck, New South Wales, where he began writing songs. After making some rough recordings, he sent them off to his friend and mentor, Matt Sherrod, for some input. Crighton asked Sherrod to come out from the US and play the new songs with him, and they recorded an album in a week and a half.

In March 2016 Crighton released his self-titled album. The album was nominated for Best Independent Country Album at the AIR Awards of 2017.

In March 2017, Crighton released a limited edition EP titled Hope Recovery.

In May 2018 Crighton released Empire. The album was named Album of the Year by Dave Faulkner in The Saturday Paper. Blues for the Bush festival said, "Produced by established producer and collaborator Matt Sherrod and recorded in a series of evocative settings, Empire expands Crighton's powerful sound into sprawling new planes and finds the singer-songwriter bringing a cinematographer's eye for detail to bear on his unique and immersive lyrical style."

In February 2022, Crighton released Water and Dust. Scenestr said "Water and Dust is an album that will gift new layers with repeat listens, revealing more and more of William's soul, the artist's honest storytelling capturing the many facets of the Australian character that will resonate deeply." The album won the Best Blues and Roots Album at the 2022 ARIA Music Awards.

== Personal life ==
Crighton is married to Jules and they have two daughters, Olive and Abigail and son Jack. They live in the Hunter Valley, Australia.

== Discography ==
=== Studio albums ===
List of studio albums, with release date and label shown
| Title | Details | Peak chart positions |
| Title | Details | AUS |
|---|---|---|
| This Time of Year (As Clint Crighton) | Released: March 2011; Label: Talking Moon Music (CCCD2011); Formats: CD, download | — |
| William Crighton | Released: March 2016; Label: ABC Music (4777232); Formats: CD, LP, digital download | — |
| Empire | Released: 4 May 2018; Label: ABC Music (6741409); Formats: CD, LP, digital download | — |
| Water and Dust | Released: 11 February 2022; Label: ABC Music (ABCM0003); Formats: CD, LP, digital download | — |
| Colonial Drift | Released: 20 March 2026; Label: ABC Music (ABCM0063); Formats: CD, LP, digital download | 30 |

=== Extended plays ===
List of extended plays, with release date and label shown
| Title | Details |
|---|---|
| Change (As Clint Crighton) | Released: 2001; Label: Clint Crighton; Formats: CDr |
| Laydown (As Clint Crighton) | Released: 2004; Label: Clint Crighton; Formats: CDr |
| The April EP (As Clint Crighton) | Released: 2009; Label: Talking Moon Music (TM0409); Formats: CD, download |
| Hope Recovery | Released: March 2017; Label: ABC Music (0602557547313); Formats: 7” LP (limited to 300 signed numbered copies) |

== Awards and nominations ==
=== AIR Awards ===
The Australian Independent Record Awards (commonly known informally as AIR Awards) is an annual awards night to recognise, promote and celebrate the success of Australia's Independent Music sector.

| Year | Nominee / work | Award | Result | Ref. |
|---|---|---|---|---|
| 2017 | William Crighton | Best Independent Country Album | Nominated | |
| 2023 | Water and Dust | Best Independent Blues and Roots Album or EP | Nominated | |

=== ARIA Music Awards ===
The ARIA Music Awards is an annual awards ceremony that recognises excellence, innovation, and achievement across all genres of Australian music. They commenced in 1987.

| Year | Nominee / work | Award | Result | Ref. |
|---|---|---|---|---|
| 2022 | Water and Dust | Best Blues and Roots Album | Won | |
| 2026 | Colonial Drift | Best Blues & Roots Album | Nominated | |

=== Environmental Music Prize ===
The Environmental Music Prize is a quest to find a theme song to inspire action on climate and conservation. It commenced in 2022.

| Year | Nominee / work | Award | Result | Ref. |
|---|---|---|---|---|
| 2022 | "Your Country" (William Crighton featuring William Barton & Julieanne Crighton) | Environmental Music Prize | Nominated | |
