= Water and Dust =

Studio album by William Crighton
- Released: 11 February 2022
- Label: ABC Music

William Crighton chronology
Empire (2018)	Water and Dust (2022)	Colonial Drift (2026)

Water and Dust is the third studio album by Australian alternative-rock artist, William Crighton, released on 11 February 2022 through ABC Music.

At the 2022 ARIA Music Awards, the album won Best Blues and Roots Album.

At the AIR Awards of 2023, the album was nominated for Best Independent Blues and Roots Album or EP.

== Critical reception ==
Professional ratings
Review scores
Source	Rating
The AU Review	4/5 stars
The Newcastle Herald	4.5/5 stars

Dylan Marshall from The AU Review said "William Crighton is all guns blazing as he takes the listener into his mind and experiences with Water and Dust; a vast and sprawling release that is as equally pulsating and enticing as it is calmed and familiar." Dylan said the album "cements him as one of Australia's finest artists".

Josh Leeson from The Newcastle Herald said "Crighton is telling the bush's own story. Its rage. Its memories. Its myths. Its beauty … Water and Dust is his finest work."

Gareth Bryant from Scenestr said "There's a raw intensity to William Crighton's newest studio album Water and Dust, the rage simmering just below the surface fuelling a diverse soundscape that navigates brooding blues, rollicking folk-rock, impassioned post-punk and starkly beautiful indie rock, alt. country." Bryant also said "Water and Dust is an album that will gift new layers with repeat listens, revealing more and more of William's soul, the artist's honest storytelling capturing the many facets of the Australian character that will resonate deeply."

== Track listing ==
1. "Water and Dust" - 6:23
2. "Your Country" - 3:20
3. "Killara" - 7:52
4. "Keep Facing the Sunshine" - 4:15
5. "The Wheel" - 4:13
6. "This Is Magic" - 3:07
7. "Stand" - 3:32
8. "After All (Good World)" - 5:20
9. "I'm So Lost Without You" - 4:39
