= Cold Water (album) =

Studio album by Mia Dyson
- Released: May 2003
- Studio: Sing Sing
- Genres: Blues; roots
- Label: Backdoor/MGM
- Producers: Mia Dyson, Lloyd Barratt

Mia Dyson chronology
Cold Water (2003)	Parking Lots (2005)

Cold Water is the debut album from Australian blues and roots musician, Mia Dyson, and was released in May 2003.

Cold Water highlights Dyson's song writing and musicianship and a collaboration with Dean Addison and Carl Pannuzzo. Apart from the vocals, Dyson plays electric, baritone, acoustic and lap steel guitars as well as piano. It introduces guest musicians, Steve Hesketh (Sime Nugent, Dan Brodie) on Hammond and piano, Sime Nugent and Kylie Auldist on backing vocals and Jaimi Faulkner on guitar. Included on the album is "St Kilda Lament" written by Ashley Davies, who played a solo on acoustic guitar.

The album was co-produced by Dyson with Lloyd Barratt, her sometime domestic partner, in a mud brick farmhouse just outside Daylesford. It was mixed by Craig Pilkington at Audrey Studio in Richmond.

The Age's Patrick Donovan opined, "[she] blew audiences away with her powerfully emotive voice and dynamic guitar playing on her debut album Cold Water. But the songwriting was a little one-dimensional." At the ARIA Music Awards of 2003 it was nominated for Best Blues and Roots album.

== Track listing ==
1. "Lonely"
2. "Return"
3. "Roll On"
4. "Through This Town"
5. "Precious Thing"
6. "The Judgement Song"
7. "Sweet Struggle"
8. "Tali Karng"
9. "Deilaphelia"
10. "St Kilda Lament"
11. "Make a Stand"
