= Peter Gelling =

- Born: 17 February 1960; Bulli, New South Wales, Australia
- Origin: Canberra
- Died: 28 September 2018 (aged 58); Canberra, Australia
- Genres: Blues / Jazz
- Occupation(s): Blues musician, music teacher, song-writer, composer and author
- Formerly of: Blind Freddy
- Website: petergelling.com

Peter Gelling (17 February 1960 – 28 September 2018) was an Australian musician and an author. In 1994, he designed a mentoring program, Taking the Stage, to encourage young Canberra women to form bands and take up instruments not usually played by women.

His album Bluestime was nominated for the 2000 ARIA Award for Best Blues & Roots Album.

A former member of Canberra band Blind Freddy (founded in 1988 along with Mick Malouf, Paul Kindermann and Tim Spellman) he began publishing instructional manuals in 1997. He has over 130 titles to his credit for a range of instruments and styles.

In 2003, Gelling won the Musicoz award in the Blues and Roots category for his song "If it wasn't for the Blues" and his playing was described by Rolling Stone Magazine as "shimmering".

== Discography ==
=== Albums ===
Title	Details
Bluestime	Released: 1999; Label: Bent Notes; Format: CD
It Seemed Like a Dream (with Neal Pattman)	Released: July 2001; Label: Bent Notes; Format: CD
Fortune	Released: October 2003; Label: Bent Notes; Format: CD

== Awards and nominations ==
=== ARIA Music Awards ===
The ARIA Music Awards is an annual awards ceremony that recognises excellence, innovation, and achievement across all genres of Australian music.

Year	Nominee / work	Award	Result
ARIA Music Awards of 2000	Bluestime	Best Blues and Roots Album	Nominated
