= Matt Walker (Australian musician) =

Australian musician (born 1973)

- Born: 1973 (age 52–53)
- Origin: Melbourne, Victoria, Australia
- Genre: Blues

Matt Walker is an ARIA Award-winning Australian musician.

== Career ==
Walker began playing music in public at the age of 14 at the Selby Folk Club. He played at Port Fairy Folk Festival, National Folk Festival, Bridgetown Blues Festival, East Coast Blues and Roots Festival until the age of 18. Walker joined The Broderick Smith Band playing dobro, guitar and lap steel and toured extensively around Australia. Walker played on and wrote music for Broderick Smith albums My Shiralee, Songster and Crayon Angels from 1994 to 1996.

In 1995, Walker recorded Live at the Rainbow with Ashley Davies on drums, Andrew Entsch on double bass and Jerry Hale on fiddle and guitar before recording There's Life in 1996.

In 1997, Walker released I Listen to the Night with Ashley Davies. At the ARIA Music Awards of 1998, I Listen to the Night was nominated for two ARIA Awards. In 1998 and 1999, Walker toured across Europe and North America.

In June 2000, Walker released Soul Witness with Ashley Davies on drums, Chris Abrahams on piano and Ken Gormley on bass and toured with this line up. At the ARIA Music Awards of 2000, Soul Witness won the ARIA Award for Best Blues and Roots Album. Live performances included tours with Bob Dylan, Patti Smith, Jon Spencer Blues Explosion, Dirty Three, Nick Cave and the Bad Seeds, tony Joe White, Cat Power, The Black Keys, Joe Cocker and more. In 2003, Walker formed the electric trio The Necessary Few with Grant Cummerford on bass and Roger Bergodaz on drums and recorded the album Navigational Skills.

Walker and Davies contributed songs for the soundtrack Australian Rules, which won the ARIA Award for Best Original Soundtrack, Cast or Show Album at the 2003 awards. Walker and Davies also contributed two original songs for the Australian film Somersault in 2004.

On 5 September 2005, Walker and Davis released the self-titled album on Walker's label Stovepipe Records.

After some time performing and recording with various acts on the Australian scene, Walker returned in 2012 with In Echoes of Dawn.

Since 2013, Walker has been releasing music under Lost Ragas with Shane Reilly, Roger Bergodaz and Simon Burke. They have released three albums Phantom Ride (2013), Trans Atlantic Highway (2015) and This Is Not a Dream (2019)

Matt Walker released his first instrumental album, United States Of Alpho in 2022. Recorded live, the album features electric guitar and double bass (Ben Franz). It displayed Walker's ability to write deep melodic motifs in composition while retaining a largely improvised aesthetic.

While he's known as a musician and singer-songwriter, Matt Walker is also a music producer. His credits include Broderick Smith (Unknown Country), Mick Daley, Liz Stringer's Pendulum, Jimmy Dowling ( Blessing and Cursing).

== Discography ==
List of albums with selected details
Title	album details	Peak chart positions
Title	album details	AUS
Welcome Me Home	Released: 1992; Label: Dex; Formats: CD	—
Live At The Rainbow	Released: 1995; Label: Rainbow Hotel Records; Formats: CD	—
I Listen to the Night (with Ashley Davies)	Released: 1997; Label: WMinc; Formats: CD	—
Soul Witness (with Ashley Davies)	Released: June 2000; Label: WMinc; Formats: CD	199
Live At The Continental	Released: 2001; Label: WMinc; Formats: CD	—
Navigational Skills (with The Necessary Few)	Released: 2003; Label: Spaghetti Records; Formats: CD	—
Matt Walker & Ashley Davies (with Ashley Davies)	Released: 5 September 2005; Label: Stovepipe Records; Formats: CD	—
In Echoes of Dawn	Released: 7 September 2012; Label: Stovepipe Records; Formats: CD	—
Phantom Ride	Released: 7 November 2013; Label: Stovepipe Records; Formats: CD	—
United States of Alpho (with Ben Franz)	Released: 2022; Label: Stovepipe Records; Formats: CD	—
Before the Show (with Tex Perkins)	Released: 28 August 2026; Label: CHEER/XEL; Format: CD, Music download	116

== Awards ==
=== ARIA Music Awards ===
The ARIA Music Awards is an annual awards ceremony that recognises excellence, innovation, and achievement across all genres of Australian music. Walker has won 1 awards from 3 nominations.

Year	Nominee / work	Award	Result
1998	I Listen to the Night	Best Male Artist	Nominated
1998	I Listen to the Night	Best World Music Album	Nominated
2000	Soul Witness	Best Blues and Roots Album	Won
