= Colonial Drift =

Studio album by William Crighton
- Released: 20 March 2026
- Studio: The Grove Studios
- Length: 44:44
- Label: ABC Music

William Crighton chronology
Water and Dust (2022)	Colonial Drift (2026)

Colonial Drif is the fourth studio album by Australian alternative-rock artist, William Crighton. The album was announced in December 2025 and released on 20 March 2026 through ABC Music. The album peaked at number 30 on the ARIA Charts.

Upon release and in an interview with The Music Crighton said the album "stands for environmental stewardship and honouring First Nations wisdom". In an interview with The Note Crighton told the readers "I hope they feel something real. Whether that's pride, discomfort, love, urgency or gratitude — I hope it sparks reflection. The record is a snapshot of where we are and who we are at this moment. If it encourages people to listen more deeply — to the land, to each other, to the strange times we're living in — then it's done its job."

At the 2026 ARIA Music Awards, the album was nominated for Best Blues and Roots Album.

== Critical reception ==
Australian Broadcasting Corporation said "A deeply personal and evocative body of work, Colonial Drift is unmistakably Australian and stands as Crighton's boldest work yet." Adding "Sonically, Colonial Drift moves between rock, psych, blues, and roots, enriched by natural soundscapes and snippets of poems/speeches & musical interludes woven throughout the record - culminating in what is becoming known as 'Bush Psych'".

Bryget Chrisfield from The Music described the album as "career-defining"

John Bradbury from 13th Floor said "Throughout Colonial Drift a layer of environmental sound sits just beneath the music, buzzing, croaking and distant movement that gives the impression of being outside, surrounded by something constant and older than the songs themselves. At times the album's commitment to atmosphere and structure slows its momentum, with some passages lingering longer than they need to. Even so, the cumulative effect is immersive, creating a strong sense of place and drawing the listener into its world."

== Track listing ==
1. "Drift I" - 0:58
2. "Horizon" - 4:01
3. "Further Down the Road" - 3:29
4. "Warzone" - 4:25
5. "Love Works" - 3:42
6. "Australia" - 3:34
7. "Poor Ned" - 3:02
8. "Drift II" - 0:56
9. "Sex, Death & Choices" - 4:26
10. "Sick Boy" - 3:37
11. "Murrumbidgee" - 3:08
12. "Drift III" - 1:21
13. "Beautiful Country" - 4:07
14. "Peaceful Land" - 3:57

== Charts ==
Weekly chart performance for Colonial Drift
Chart (2026)	Peak position
Australian Albums (ARIA)	30
