= 2014 ARIA Music Awards =

Annual Australian music awards

- Date: 26 November 2014
- Venue: Star Event Centre, Sydney, New South Wales

Highlights
- Most wins: Chet Faker (5)
- Most nominations: Chet Faker (9)
- Website: ariaawards.com.au

Television/radio coverage
- Network: Network Ten

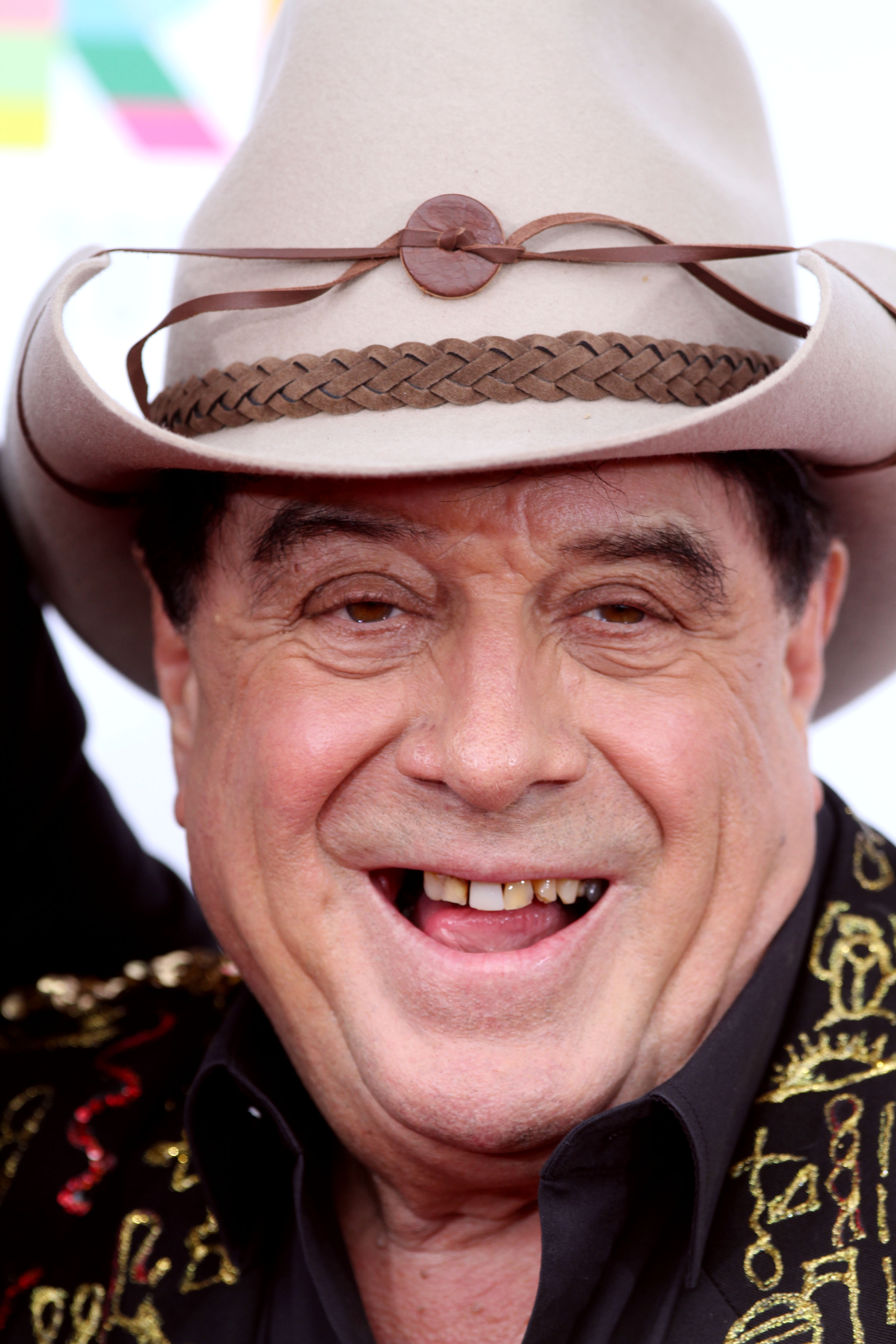
Molly Meldrum, host of Countdown (1974–87), was the Hall of Fame inductee

The 28th Annual Australian Recording Industry Association Music Awards (generally known as the ARIA Music Awards or simply the ARIAs) are a series of award ceremonies which include the 2014 ARIA Artisan Awards, ARIA Hall of Fame Awards, ARIA Fine Arts Awards and ARIA Awards. The latter ceremony took place on 26 November at the Star Event Centre, and was telecast by Network Ten.

The final nominees for ARIA Awards categories were announced on 10 October, as well as nominees and winners for Fine Arts Awards and Artisan Awards. Public votes were used for the categories, Song of the Year, Best Australian Live Act, Best International Artist and Best Video.

Also on 26 November, ARIA inducted Molly Meldrum and his TV series, Countdown, into their Hall of Fame. Denis Handlin, CEO of Sony Music Entertainment Australia and New Zealand, and ARIA Chairman, was presented with the second ARIA Industry Icon Award. In October 2021 the Board of ARIA withdrew Handlin's award. Handlin had left Sony in June 2021 amid "multiple allegations of toxic culture" at the company while he was CEO.

== Performers ==
The following artists performed at the ARIA Music Awards.

- 5 Seconds of Summer (Opening)
- One Direction
- Chet Faker
- Hilltop Hoods
- Jessica Mauboy
- Justice Crew
- Sheppard

== Presenters ==
- Havana Brown and Nathaniel presented Best Dance Release
- Russell Morris presented Best Australian Live Act
- Matt Okine and Alex Dyson presented Best Independent Release
- Samantha Jade presented Best Video
- Tom Ballard presented Best Group and Best Comedy Release
- Danny Clayton and Carissa Walford presented Best Pop Release
- Kasey Chambers presented Best Blues & Roots Album
- Illy and Charli XCX presented Breakthrough Artist
- Justine Clarke presented Best Children's Album
- Dom Alessio presented Best Hard Rock/Heavy Metal Album
- Troy Cassar-Daley presented Best Country Album
- Ash London presented Best Urban Album
- Ella Hooper presented Best Rock Album
- Scott Tweedie and Delta Goodrem presented Song Of The Year
- Marcia Hines and John Paul Young inducts Ian Molly Meldrum into the ARIA Hall Of Fame
- John Butler Trio presented Best Adult Contemporary Album
- Jessica Mauboy presented Best Male Artist
- Katy Perry presented Best Female Artist
- The Veronicas presented Best International Artist
- Jon & Tim Farriss (INXS) presented Album Of The Year

== ARIA Hall of Fame Inductees ==
In late October 2014 ARIA announced their Hall of Fame inductees:

- Molly Meldrum
- Countdown

== Nominees and winners ==
=== ARIA Awards ===
Winners are listed first and highlighted in boldface; other final nominees are listed alphabetically by artists' first name.

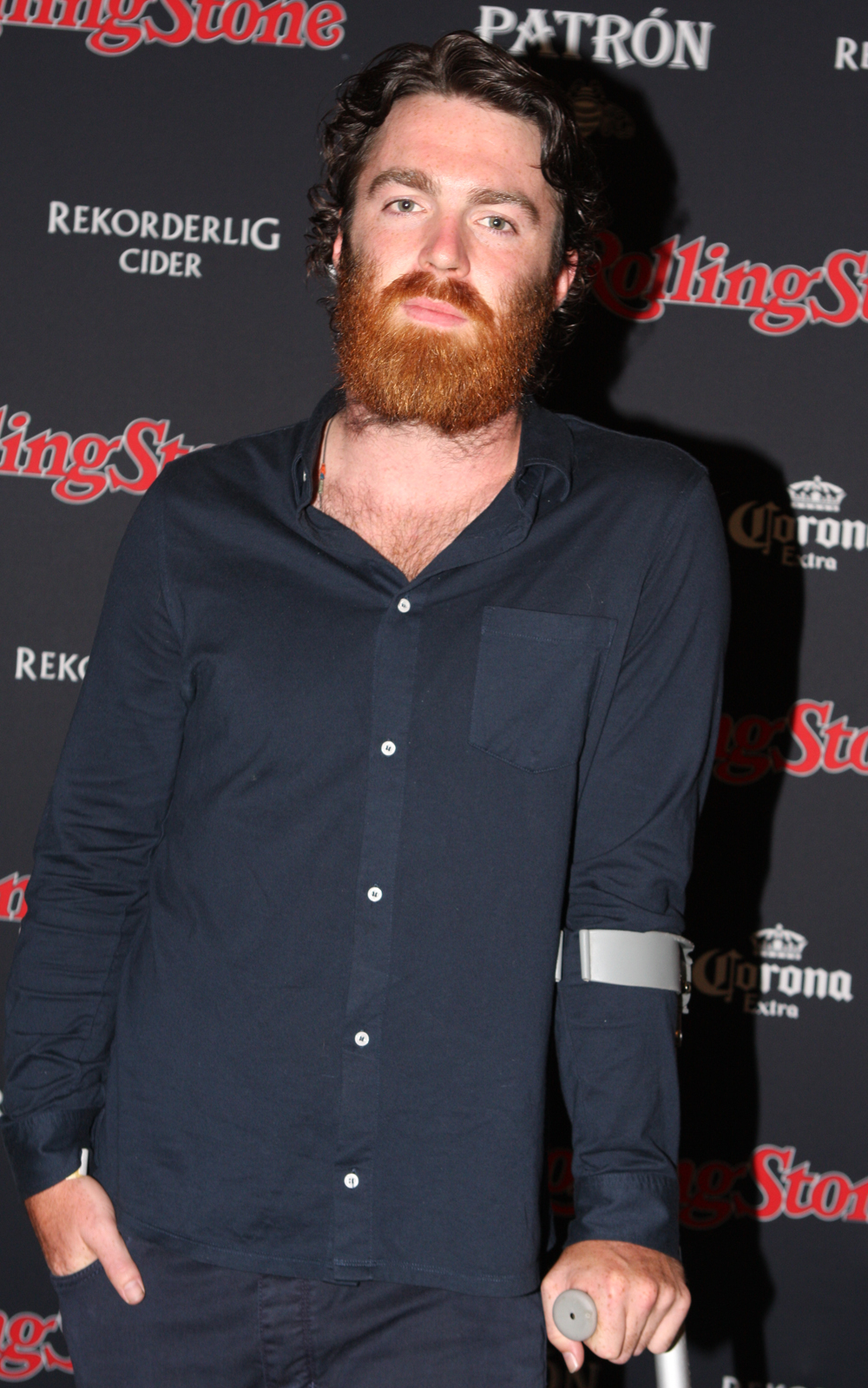
Chet Faker was nominated for nine awards, winning five, including three Artisan Awards. Photo taken in 2013.

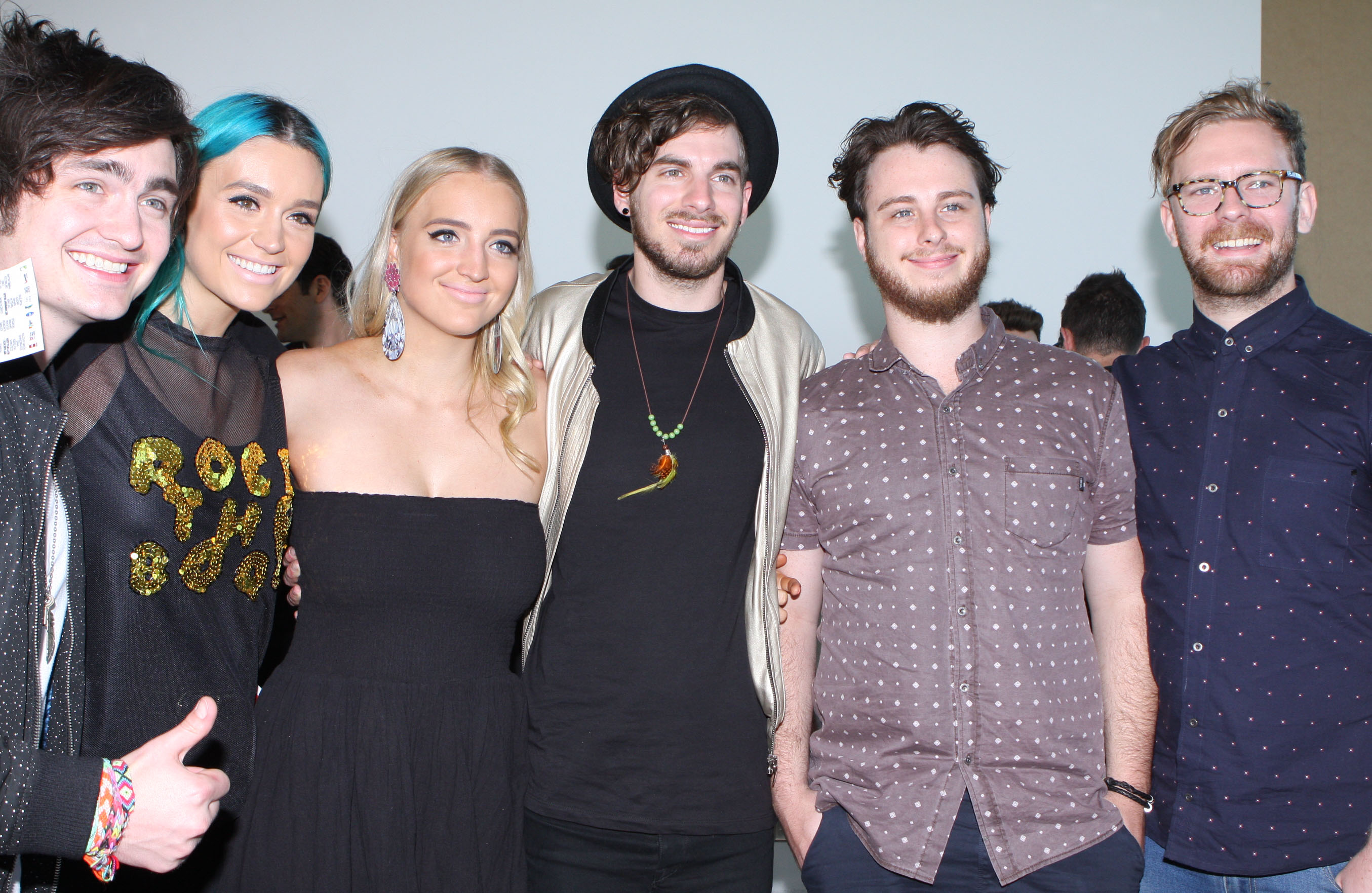
Sheppard were nominated for seven categories and won one award for Best Group.

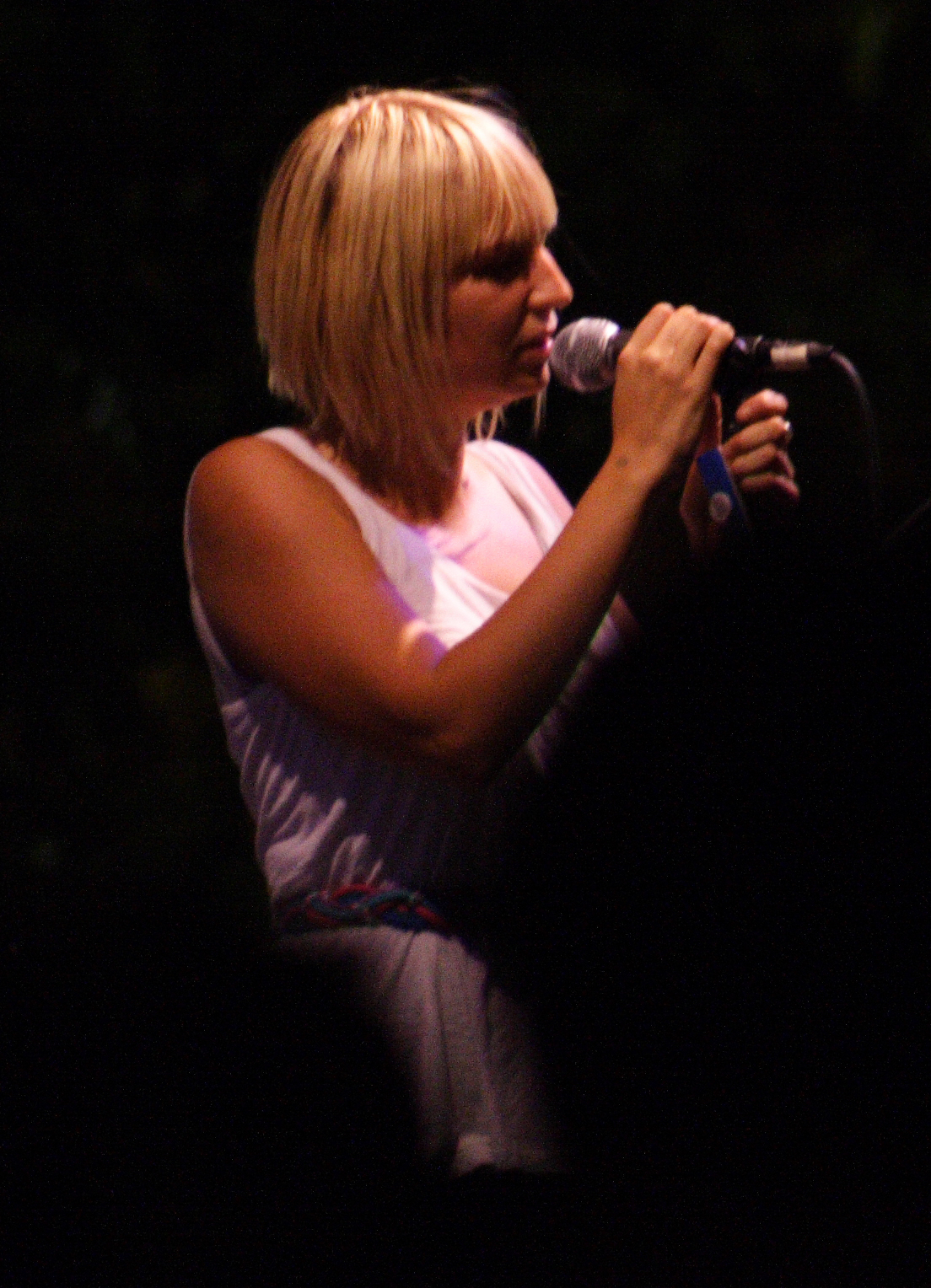
Sia was nominated for six categories and won four, including Best Female Artist.

| Album of the Year | Best Group |
|---|---|
| **Sia – 1000 Forms of Fear (Inertia Recordings)**; Chet Faker – Built on Glass (Future Classic); Dan Sultan – Blackbird (Liberation Music); Jessica Mauboy – Beautiful (Sony Music Entertainment Australia); Sheppard – Bombs Away (Empire Of Song/Chugg Music/MGM Distribution) | **Sheppard – Bombs Away (Empire Of Song/Chugg Music/MGM Distribution)**; 5 Seconds of Summer – 5 Seconds of Summer (EMI); Hilltop Hoods – Walking Under Stars (Golden Era Records/Island Records Australia/Universal Music Australia); RÜFÜS – "Sundream" (Sweat It Out/Sony Music Entertainment Australia); Violent Soho – "Saramona Said" (I OH YOU/Illusive/Universal Music Australia) |
| Best Male Artist | Best Female Artist |
| **Chet Faker – Built on Glass (Future Classic)**; Dan Sultan – Blackbird (Liberation Music); Geoffrey Gurrumul Yunupingu – Gurrumul & The Sydney Symphony Orchestra – His Life and Music (ABC Music/Universal Music Australia); Guy Sebastian – "Come Home with Me" (Sony Music Entertainment Australia); Vance Joy – "Mess Is Mine" (Liberation Music) | **Sia – 1000 Forms of Fear (Inertia Recordings)**; Adalita – All Day Venus (Liberation Music); Iggy Azalea – The New Classic (Virgin/Universal Music Australia); Jessica Mauboy – Beautiful (Sony Music Entertainment Australia); Kasey Chambers – Bittersweet (Essence Group) |
| Breakthrough Artist | Best Independent Release |
| **Iggy Azalea – The New Classic (Virgin/Universal Music Australia)**; 5 Seconds of Summer – 5 Seconds of Summer (EMI); Andy Bull – Sea of Approval (Island Records Australia/Universal Music Australia); Chet Faker – Built on Glass (Future Classic); The Kite String Tangle – Vessel EP (Warner Music Australia) | **Chet Faker – Built on Glass (Future Classic)**; Dan Sultan – Blackbird (Liberation Music); Sheppard – Bombs Away (Empire Of Song/Chugg Music/MGM Distribution); Vance Joy – "Mess Is Mine" (Liberation Music); Violent Soho – "Saramona Said" (I OH YOU/Illusive/Universal Music Australia) |
| Best Adult Contemporary Album | Best Blues & Roots Album |
| **Neil Finn & Paul Kelly – Goin' Your Way (EMI)**; Gossling – Harvest of Gold (Dew Process); Kate Miller-Heidke – O Vertigo! (Cooking Vinyl Australia); Nick Cave and the Bad Seeds – Live from KCRW (Kobalt Label Services); Tina Arena – Reset (EMI) | **John Butler Trio – Flesh & Blood (Jarrah Records/MGM Distribution)**; Harry Hookey – Misdiagnosed (Essence Group); Russell Morris – Van Diemen's Land (Fanfare Records/EMI); The Audreys – 'Til My Tears Roll Away (ABC Music/Universal Music Australia); The Bamboos – Fever in the Road (Pacific Theatre/Inertia Recordings) |
| Best Hard Rock/Heavy Metal Album | Best Rock Album |
| **DZ Deathrays – Black Rat (I OH YOU/Illusive/Universal Music Australia)**; High Tension – Death Beat (Cooking Vinyl Australia); Shihad – FVEY (Warner Music NZ); Sleepmakeswaves – Love of Cartography (Bird's Robe Records/MGM Distribution); The Amity Affliction – Let the Ocean Take Me (Roadrunner Records Inc) | **Dan Sultan – Blackbird (Liberation Music)**; Angus & Julia Stone – Angus & Julia Stone (EMI); Ball Park Music – Puddinghead (Stop Start Music); Jimmy Barnes – 30:30 Hindsight (Liberation Music); Kingswood – Microscopic Wars (Dew Process) |
| Best Urban Album | Best Country Album |
| **Hilltop Hoods – Walking Under Stars (Golden Era Records/Island Records Australia/Universal Music Australia)**; 360 – Utopia (Forthwrite/EMI); Iggy Azalea – The New Classic (Virgin/Universal Music Australia); Illy – Cinematic (Warner Music Australia); Thundamentals – So We Can Remember (Obese Records) | **Kasey Chambers – Bittersweet (Essence Group)**; Adam Brand – My Side of the Street (ABC Music/Universal Music Australia); Emma Swift – Emma Swift (Laughing Outlaw/Inertia Recordings); Keith Urban – Fuse (Capitol/EMI); The McClymonts – Here's to You & I (Island Records Australia/Universal Music Australia) |
| Best Children's Album | Best Comedy Release |
| **The Wiggles – Apples & Bananas (ABC Music/Universal Music Australia)**; Alex Papps – Let's Put the Beat in Our Feet (ABC Music/Universal Music Australia); Ali McGregor – Ali McGregor's Jazzamatazz (ABC Music/Universal Music Australia); Jay Laga'aia – Christmas at Jay's Place (ABC Music/Universal Music Australia); Sam Moran – Play Along with Sam: We're Gonna Dance! (6 Degrees Records/MGM Distribution) | **Buddy Goode – It's a Buddy Goode Christmas (ABC Music/Universal Music Australia)**; Frank Walnut – The Frank Walnut Reflective Drink Coaster (One Louder Recordings/Universal Music Australia); Ja'mie (Chris Lilley) – "Learning to Be Me" (ABC Music); Ronny Chieng – The Ron Way (Century Entertainment); The Beards – The Beard Album (Independent/MGM Distribution) |
| Best Pop Release | Best Dance Release |
| **Sia – 1000 Forms of Fear (Inertia Recordings)**; 5 Seconds of Summer – 5 Seconds of Summer (EMI); Andy Bull – Sea of Approval (Island Records Australia/Universal Music Australia); Justice Crew – "Que Sera" (Sony Music Entertainment Australia); Sheppard – Bombs Away (Empire Of Song/Chugg Music/MGM Distribution) | **Peking Duk featuring Nicole Millar – "High" (Vicious/Universal Music Australia)**; Flume & Chet Faker – "Drop the Game" (Future Classic); Nicky Night Time – Everybody Together (ONELOVE/Xelon); RÜFÜS – "Sundream" (Sweat It Out/Sony Music Entertainment Australia); The Presets – "No Fun" (Modular/Universal Music Australia) |
| Song of the Year (Note: Public voted category.) | Best Australian Live Act |
| **5 Seconds of Summer – "She Looks So Perfect" (EMI)**; Guy Sebastian – "Like a Drum" (Sony Music Entertainment Australia); Havana Brown – "Warrior" (Island Records Australia/Universal Music Australia); Iggy Azalea featuring Charli XCX – "Fancy" (Virgin/Universal Music Australia); Joel Fletcher featuring Savage – "Swing" (Hussle Recordings/Ministry Of Sound); Justice Crew – "Que Sera" (Sony Music Entertainment Australia); Nathaniel – "You" (DNA Songs/Sony Music Entertainment Australia); Sheppard – "Geronimo" (Empire Of Song/Chugg Music/MGM Distribution); Sia – "Chandelier" (Inertia Recordings); Taylor Henderson – "Borrow My Heart" (Sony Music Entertainment Australia) | **Keith Urban - Light The Fuse Tour (Capitol/EMI)**; Boy & Bear - National Tour (Island Records Australia/Universal Music Australia); Dan Sultan - Blackbird Album Tour (Liberation Music); John Butler Trio - Flesh & Blood Tour (Jarrah Records/MGM Distribution); Melbourne SKA Orchestra - The Diplomat Tour (ABC Music/Universal Music Australia); RÜFÜS - Worlds Within Worlds Tour (Sweat It Out/Sony Music Entertainment Australia); Tame Impala - Big Day Out 2014 (Universal Music Australia); The Preatures - Two Tone Medley Tour (Mercury Records Australia/Universal Music Australia); The Presets - The National Tour (Modular/Universal Music Australia); Violent Soho - National Tour (I OH YOU/Illusive/Universal Music Australia) |
| Best International Artist | Best Video |
| **One Direction – Midnight Memories (Syco Music)**; Avicii – True (PM:AM/Universal Music Australia); Beyoncé – Beyoncé (Columbia); Coldplay – Ghost Stories (Parlophone); Ed Sheeran – x (Atlantic UK); Eminem – The Marshall Mathers LP 2 (Interscope Geffen/Universal Music Australia); Jason Derulo – Tattoos (Warner Bros NZ); Katy Perry – Prism (EMI); Lorde – Pure Heroine (Universal Music NZ/Universal Music Australia); Pharrell Williams – G I R L (Columbia) | **Sia – "Chandelier" – Sia Furler, Daniel Askill (Inertia Recordings)**; Bluejuice – "SOS" – Christian J Henrich, Nicholas Rabone (Dew Process); Busby Marou – "My Second Mistake" – Renny Wijeyamohan (Warner Music Australia); Chet Faker – "Talk Is Cheap" – Toby & Pete (Future Classic); Courtney Barnett – "Avant Gardener" – Charlie Ford (Milk! Records/Inertia Recordings); Jessica Mauboy – "Never Be the Same" – Lawrence Lim (Sony Music Entertainment Australia); John Butler Trio – "Only One" – Ben Young (Jarrah Records/MGM Distribution); Justice Crew – "Que Sera" – Lawrence Lim (Sony Music Entertainment Australia); Sheppard – "Geronimo" – Toby Morris (Empire Of Song/Chugg Music/MGM Distribution); Violent Soho – "Covered in Chrome" – Dan Graetz (I OH YOU/Illusive/Universal Music Australia) |

=== Fine Arts Awards ===
Winners are listed first and highlighted in boldface; other final nominees are listed alphabetically by artists' first name. (Note: The winners of the Fine Arts Awards were announced on 7 October 2014.)

Best Classical Album
- **Westlake**, **Lior** & **Sydney Symphony Orchestra** – **Compassion (ABC Classics/Universal Music Australia)**
  - Australian World Orchestra, Zubin Mehta – Stravinsky Rite of Spring / Mahler Symphony No. 1 (ABC Classics/Universal Music Australia)
  - Emma Mathews, Tasmanian Symphony Orchestra, Marko Letonja – Mozart Arias (ABC Classics/Universal Music Australia)
  - Joe Chindamo & Zoë Black – Dido's Lament (Mo'OzArt/The Planet Company)
  - Latitude 37 – Empires (ABC Classics/Universal Music Australia)
  - Andrew MacLeod, Melbourne Symphony Orchestra, Benjamin Northey, Markus Stenz – Ades Polaris / Stanhope Piccolo Concerto (ABC Classics/Universal Music Australia)
  - Topology – Share House (Independent/MGM Distribution)
Best Jazz Album
- **Paul Grabowsky Sextet** – **The Bitter Suite (ABC Jazz/Universal Music Australia)**
  - Andrea Keller Quartet with Strings – Wave Rider (Jazzhead/MGM Distribution)
  - Emma Pask – Season of My Heart (Mercury Records Australia/Universal Music Australia)
  - Graeme Lyall, John Hoffman, Tony Gould, Ben Robertson, Tony Floyd – The Hunters & Pointers (Which Way Music/Fuse Group)
  - Vince Jones – The Monash Sessions (Jazzhead/MGM)
Best Original Soundtrack/Cast/Show Album
- **Geoffrey Gurrumul Yunupingu**, **Sydney Symphony Orchestra** – **Gurrumul: His Life and Music (ABC Music/Universal Music Australia)**
  - Glenn Shorrock, Brian Cadd – The Story of Sharky and The Caddman (Fanfare Classic/EMI)
  - Katie Noonan – Fierce Hearts: The Music of Love-Song-Circus (KIN Music/Universal Music Australia)
  - Various Artists– Spirit of Akasha (Warner Music Australia)
  - Various Artists – triple j's One Night Stand: Mildura (ABC Music/Universal Music Australia)
Best World Music Album
- **Joseph Tawadros** – **Permission to Evaporate (ABC Music/Universal Music Australia)**
  - Astronomy Class – Mekong Delta Sunrise (Elefant Traks/Inertia Recordings)
  - Jane Rutter – Flute Spirit: Dreams and Improvisations (ABC Classics/Universal Music Australia)
  - The Barons of Tang – Into the Mouths of Hungry Giants (Bird's Robe Records/MGM Distribution)
  - William Barton – Birdsong at Dusk (ABC Classics/Universal Music Australia)

=== Artisan Awards ===
Winners are listed first and highlighted in boldface; other final nominees are listed alphabetically by artists' first name. (Note: The winners of the Artisan Awards were announced on 7 October 2014.)

Best Cover Art
- **Tin & Ed** – **Chet Faker** – **Built on Glass (Future Classic)**
  - Angus & Julia Stone – Angus & Julia Stone – Angus & Julia Stone (EMI)
  - Celeste Potter – DZ Deathrays – Black Rat (I OH YOU/Illusive/Universal Music Australia)
  - Sia Furler – Sia – 1000 Forms of Fear (Inertia Recordings) (Note: The main ARIA source gives Cover Art by Sia, and includes "'Best Cover Art' designed by Sia". However another ARIA source has nominees for Best Cover Art with: Zoe Zag – 1000 Forms of Fear – Sia. The album's liner notes has "All photos by Sia. Art direction by Sia. Design by Anita Marisa Boriboon and Sia. Font created by Zoe Zag".)
  - The Leonard Brothers – 360 – Utopia (Forthwrite/EMI)
Engineer of the Year
- **Eric J Dubowsky** – **Chet Faker** – **Built on Glass (Future Classic)**
  - Dustin Tebbutt – Dustin Tebbutt – Bones EP (Eleven: A Music Company Pty Ltd/Universal Music Australia)
  - Paul McKercher – Andy Bull – Sea of Approval (Island Records Australia/Universal Music Australia)
  - Matthew Lambert, Barry Francis – Hilltop Hoods – Walking Under Stars (Golden Era Records/Island Records Australia/Universal Music Australia)
  - Nicholas Wilson, Dann Hume – Sticky Fingers – Land of Pleasure (Sureshaker/MGM Distribution)
  - Virginia Read – Simon Tedeschi, James Morrison, Sarah McKenzie – Gershwin: Take Two (ABC Jazz/Universal Music Australia)
Producer of the Year
- **Nicholas Murphy** – **Chet Faker** – **Built on Glass (Future Classic)**
  - Alex JL Hiew and SLUMS – Troye Sivan – TRXYE (EMI)
  - Nicholas Wilson, Dann Hume – Sticky Fingers – Land of Pleasure (Sureshaker/MGM Distribution)
  - Stuart Stuart – Sheppard – Bombs Away (Empire Of Song/Chugg Music/MGM Distribution)
  - Virginia Read – Simon Tedeschi, James Morrison, Sarah McKenzie – Gershwin: Take Two (ABC Jazz/Universal Music Australia)

== See also ==
- Music of Australia
