= When the Flood Comes =

Studio album by The Audreys
- Released: 18 April 2008
- Recorded: Yikesville Studios, Melbourne
- Genres: Blues & Roots
- Label: Kybosh Records/ABC Music/Universal
- Producer: Shane O'Mara

The Audreys chronology
Between Last Night And Us (2006)	When the Flood Comes (2008)	Sometimes the Stars (2010)

Professional ratings
Review scores
Source	Rating
Eleven Magazine	link
Independent Weekly	link
Rave Magazine	link
The Sydney Morning Herald	link

When the Flood Comes is the second studio album by Australian blues/roots band, The Audreys. The album was released 18 April 2008 on Kybosh Records and distributed by Universal Music Australia.

The album debuted and peaked at number 20 on the ARIA Charts ARIA Album Charts.

At the ARIA Music Awards of 2008, the band won Best Blues and Roots Album.

In an interview, Tristan Goodall explained that the majority of the album had been written in New York City. "When we found we couldn't write when we got back off the road, we were like 'What are we going to do?' Then we went back down to Nashville saw about a million bands in about five days and went back to New York and wrote some more. After that we saw what we had would be the big pick up for the album."

== Track listing ==
All tracks written by Taasha Coates and Tristan Goodall, except where noted.

1. "Chelsea Blues" - 4:23
2. "Head So Heavy" - 3:37
3. "Paradise City" - 5:04
4. "Lay Me Down" - 4:03
5. "Closing Time" - 3:53
6. "When the Flood Comes" - 4:21
7. "Anchor" - 2:49
8. "Sally & the Preacher" - 3:43
9. "Small Things" - 4:07
10. "Here He Lies" - 4:40
11. "Songbird" - 4:40
12. "More to a Sinner" - 4:32

== Charts ==
Chart (2008)	Peak position
Australian Albums (ARIA)	20

== Personnel ==
- Taasha Coates - voice, melodica, harmonica, ukulele
- Tristan Goodall - national reso-phonic guitar, acoustic guitar, banjo
- Michael Green - violin, mandolin, harmonies
- Lyndon Gray - double bass, harmonies
- Toby Lang - drums, harmonies
