= Andy Cowan (musician) =

Australian blues/soul pianist and singer

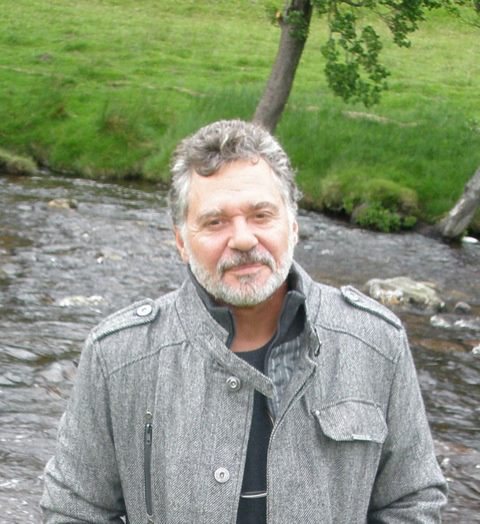

Background information
- Born: 25 November 1952 (age 72); Melbourne, Australia
- Genres: Soul Blues

Andy Cowan (born 25 November 1952) is an Australian blues soul pianist and singer. He was nominated for the 2001 ARIA Award for Best Blues and Roots Album with 10.30 Thursdays.

Andy Cowan was a member of Madder Lake (1973–75) and Ayers Rock (1978-81) and toured with Renee Geyer, Kevin Borich and Ian Moss. Cowan has done session work for many Australian recordings and film and has released eight solo albums and a live DVD "A Tale Of Two Cities" recorded in Melbourne and Sydney. He currently lives on the Sunshine Coast, Queensland, Australia.

== Discography ==
=== Albums ===
List of albums with selected details
Title	album details
Train I'm On	Released: 1997; Label: Andy Cowan; Formats: CD
One of These Days - Live (with Big Mama's Door)	Released: 1999; Label: Swallowfield Productions (BMD 99); Formats: CD
10.30 Thursdays	Released: June 2001; Label: Black Market Music (BMM 245.2); Formats: CD
Sweet Release	Released: August 2004; Label: ABC/Universal Music (13712); Formats: CD
Anthology	Released: 2007; Label: ABC/Universal Music (5144225172); Formats: CD; Note: compilation
When the Night Comes In	Released: 2009; Label: ABC/Universal Music (2713697); Formats: CD
After the Rain	Released: 2014; Label: ABC/Universal Music (4713196); Formats: CD

== Awards ==
=== ARIA Music Awards ===
The ARIA Music Awards is an annual awards ceremony that recognises excellence, innovation, and achievement across all genres of Australian music.

Year	Nominee / work	Award	Result
ARIA Music Awards of 2001	10.30pm Thursdays	Best Blues & Roots Album	Nominated
