= Dave Hole =

Western Australian slide guitarist

- Born: Robert David Hole; 30 March 1948 (age 78); Heswall, Cheshire, United Kingdom
- Origin: Perth, Western Australia, Australia
- Genres: Blues, rock and roll
- Occupation: Musician
- Instrument: Slide guitar
- Years active: 1965–present
- Labels: Black Cat, Alligator, Festival, Provogue
- Website: davehole.com

Robert David Hole (born 30 March 1948, Heswall, Cheshire, England) is an Australian slide guitarist and singer known for his unique style of playing rock and roll and blues music.

In 1990 he issued Short Fuse Blues which brought him to the attention of United States label, Alligator Records. Two of his albums have appeared on Billboard Top Blues Albums, Steel on Steel (1995) peaked at No. 13 and Ticket to Chicago (1997) reached No. 15. His sixth album, Under the Spell, appeared in April 1999 and won "Best Blues & Roots Album" at the ARIA Music Awards of that year.

Hole is noted for his unusual performance style, which alternates traditionally plucked notes and chords with the slide notes played by his hand draped over the guitar's neck. According to Australian rock music historian Ian McFarlane, Hole "is the most acclaimed blues guitarist Australia has ever produced... courtesy of his unorthodox slide guitar style, his rousing live shows and a series of hard-rocking, roadhouse blues albums... yet it took two decades of slogging around the Australian touring circuit before the local industry sat up and took notice".

== Biography ==
=== 1948–1960s ===
Robert David Hole was born on 30 March 1948 in Heswall, United Kingdom, due to a mix up at the hospital he was named Robert when it should have been David. The family called him David and now he goes by David Robert Hole. When he was four years old his family moved to Perth, Western Australia. He became interested in blues music after hearing a school friend's Muddy Waters' album when aged six. At twelve years old he received his first guitar and started to teach himself due to lack of availability of teachers. He used the albums of Eric Clapton, Jimi Hendrix, Blind Willie Johnson, Skip James, Blind Lemon Jefferson to learn. He later used work of Robert Johnson, Elmore James, and Mississippi Fred McDowell. Hole is left-handed and, after breaking a finger in a football accident, he played the guitar right-handed. "I had to have a cast on it. So I came up with this idea, just while I was recuperating, of jamming the slide on my index finger and hanging it over the top of the guitar – quite an awkward sort of style, really. It took me about three months before this cast came off. And over that time it started to feel good".

In 1965 Hole formed his first group, Broken Habits, which included Daryl Upson on bass guitar. The following year he created the earliest version of Dave Hole Band with Upson, Denis Crake on vocals and Jim Morris on drums. In 1968 Hole joined The Beat 'n Tracks, a pop, blues, R&B band formed in early 1967 with Ace Follington on drums, Warren Morgan on keyboards and vocals, Ross Partington on lead vocals and Murray Wilkins on bass guitar. They played covers of The Beatles, Paul Butterfield, Motown and Vanilla Fudge material. The group won the 1968 Perth heat of the national Hoadley's Battle of the Sounds and travelled to Melbourne for the final. They also toured the eastern states before Hole returned to Perth late that year to continue his university studies. He was replaced by Phil Manning (ex-Bay City Union, Laurie Allen Revue) on guitar and lead vocals – The Beat 'n Tracks evolved into Chain.

=== 1970s ===
In 1972 Hole formed Dave Hole Blues Band with Upson and Al Kash on drums (ex-Blackfeather), the trio relocated to London and played in local pubs. Hole returned to Perth in 1974, from that time for twenty years, he toured the Western Australian pub circuit with differing line-ups of Dave Hole Band. By 1977 with Hole were Phil Bailey on bass guitar and Ian Ironside on drums. They provided two tracks, "Country Town" and "Still in Love with You", for a various artists compilation, The 6WF Rock Group Album which appeared in 1979. Also that year Hole joined with Matt Taylor (ex-Bay City Union, Chain, Western Flyer) on lead vocals and harmonica to form Matt Taylor Band featuring Dave Hole, they were backed by Paul Pooley on bass guitar (Manteca) and Ric Whittle on drums (Fatty Lumpkin, Manteca). They toured Australia "playing some of the most electrifying blues rock ever heard in this country". By late 1980 the group dissolved without recording any material.

=== 1980–1990s ===
During the 1980s Dave Hole Band continued with various line-ups until 1988, when he established Short Fuse with John Wilson on bass guitar and Ronnie Parker on drums. In 1990 they released an album, Short Fuse Blues, which Hole had financed, produced, and recorded in three days. Bob Patient (ex-Matt Taylor's Chain) guested on keyboards and joined to tour in support of the work. Rock music historian, Ian McFarlane, observed that it is "full of Hole's sinuous, hot-wired guitar work, which evoked the spirit of Elmore James and Blind Willie Johnson". Hole sent a copy to United States magazine, Guitar Player, its editor, Jas Obrecht, wrote an article in July 1991 praising Hole as the newest guitar wizard and comparing him with Stevie Ray Vaughan and Albert King. Soon a copy of the album was in the hands of Alligator Records president Bruce Iglauer who signed Hole up as the first non-US-based artist of their 26-year history.

In November 1992 Guitar Player's critics, Art Thompson and Chris Gill, praised him – and fellow slide guitarists Sonny Landreth and Dave Tronzo – as "visionary" with a "distinctive technique" that "redefine[s] the art". While new fans were gained via radio play on more than 1000 stations. Reviews appeared in Guitar for the Practicing Musician, Billboard, Audio, Spin, Chicago Tribune, The Denver Post and Associated Press. Hole signed a deal for the European market with Provogue Records, with albums and tours of the US and Europe helping increase his popularity further. Later tours of Europe have seen him headlining festival shows in Germany, Denmark, the Netherlands, France and Switzerland with the Leverkusen Blues Festival in Germany televised nationally. He has also performed in Brazil, Sweden, Norway, Russia, Austria, Italy, Spain, Belgium and the UK. Two of his albums have appeared on Billboard Top Blues Albums chart, Steel on Steel (1995) peaked at No. 13 and Ticket to Chicago (1997) reached No. 15. In August 1997 Hole commenced his third tour of US blues festivals and displayed his "unique slide playing style which involves using his index finger rather than his pinkie".

On 20 April 1999 he issued Under the Spell, which won "Best Blues & Roots Album" at the ARIA Music Awards of that year. McFarlane noted that he "is the most acclaimed blues guitarist Australia has ever produced ... courtesy of his unorthodox slide guitar style, his rousing live shows and a series of hard-rocking, roadhouse blues albums ... yet it took two decades of slogging around the Australian touring circuit before the local industry sat up and took notice". Although under-appreciated in Australia Hole was described by Robert Messenger in The Canberra Times as "a musical genius" and "in the US he is living blues legend".

=== 2000s ===
In August 2004 Hole was interviewed by Brendan Hutchens for ABC's George Negus Tonight and recalled "It's very, very raw emotional music. And it communicates very strongly and it did to me. When I first heard blues, it bowled me over. And it's great. I love it. I love to be able to communicate with people through that, through the music".

On 19 May 2007, Hole issued his tenth album, Rough Diamond, which Sing Out!'s Gary von Tersch compared with Muddy Waters and Duane Allman as "spirited" and showed "incendiary blues and rock slide guitar". As well as releasing ten albums, Hole has continued to tour worldwide for six months each year, returning to his home in the Darling Scarp of Western Australia for the other six months.

== Discography ==
=== Studio albums ===
Title	Details	Peak chart positions
Title	Details	AUS
Outlines (as Dave Hole Band)	Released: 1980; Format: LP; Label: Dave Hole Band	—
Short Fuse Blues	Released: late 1990; Format: LP, CD, cassette; Label: Black Cat Records (BCD 1001)	118
The Plumber	Released: late 1992; Format: CD, cassette; Label: Festival Records (D 30911)	83
Working Overtime	Released: February 1994; Format: CD, cassette; Label: Festival Records (D 31050)	109
Steel on Steel	Released: May 1995; Format: CD, cassette; Label: Festival Records (D 31383)	109
Whole Lotta Blues	Released: May 1996; Format: CD, cassette; Label: Festival Records (D 31383)	145
Ticket to Chicago	Released: February 1997; Format: CD; Label: Festival Records (D 31745)	—
Under the Spell	Released: April 1999; Format: CD; Label: Black Cat Records (BCD1006)	—
Outside Looking In	Released: June 2001; Format: CD; Label: Black Cat Records	—
Rough Diamond	Released: 19 May 2007; Format: CD; Label: Black Cat Records (BCD1009)	—
Goin' Back Down	Released: 15 June 2018; Format: CD, download, streaming, LP; Label: Black Cat Records (BCD1010)	—

=== Live albums ===
Title	Album details
The Live One	Released: 11 March 2003; Format: CD; Label: Black Cat Records (BCD1008)

=== Compilation albums ===
Title	Album details
Whole Lotta Blues	Released: 1996 The Netherlands; Format: CD, cassette; Label: Provogue (PRD 70932)

=== Charted singles ===
List of charted singles, inside the national 200, with selected details
Title	Year	Chart positions
Title	Year	AUS
"You Don't Have to Be Pretty to Sing the Blues"	1993	169
"Berwick Road"	1994	187

== Awards ==
=== ARIA Music Awards ===
The ARIA Music Awards is an annual awards ceremony that recognises excellence, innovation, and achievement across all genres of Australian music.

Year	Nominee / work	Award	Result
1999	Under the Spell	Best Blues & Roots Album	Won

=== West Australian Music Industry Awards ===
The West Australian Music Industry Awards are annual awards celebrating achievements for Western Australian music. They commenced in 1985. Hole was inducted into its Hall of Fame in 2005 after winning Most Popular Original Blues Act in 2001.

Year	Nominee / work	Award	Result
2001	Dave Hole	Most Popular Original Blues Act	Won
2005	Dave Hole	Hall of Fame	inductee
