= Short Fuse Blues =

Studio album by Dave Hole
- Released: 1990
- Recorded: 1990
- Studio: Planet Studios, Perth, Western Australia
- Genre: Blues rock
- Label: Independent; Alligator Records/Festival Records
- Producer: Dave Hole

Dave Hole chronology
Short Fuse Blues (1990)	The Plumber (1994)

Professional ratings
Review scores
Source	Rating
The Penguin Guide to Blues Recordings	3/4 stars

Short Fuse Blues is the debut album by Australian blues singer and guitarist Dave Hole, released in 1990. The album was recorded over three days at Planet Studios in Perth, Western Australia. It was financed and produced by Hole. Alligator Records signed Hole as their first non-US artist in 26 years and re-released the album in 1992.

== Track listing ==
1. "Keep Your Motor Running" - Dave Hole (3:44)
2. "The Bottle" Dave Hole (4:40)
3. "Short Fuse Blues" Dave Hole (5:15)
4. "Every Girl I See" Willie Dixon & M Murphy (3:45)
5. "Something Fine" Dave Hole (3:26)
6. "Albatross" Peter Green (4:10)
7. "Night Cat" Dave Hole (5:29)
8. "Tore Down" Thompson (5:00)
9. "The Sun Is Shining" Elmore James (5:10)
10. "Business Man" Dave Hole (4:05)
11. "Take A Swing" Dave Hole (6:28)
12. "Dark Was The Night (Cold Was The Ground)" Willie Johnson (2:16)
13. "Truckload Of Lovin'" Adams & Jimmy Lewis (4:01)
14. "Purple Haze" Jimi Hendrix (3:47)

== Personnel ==
- Dave Hole - guitar, vocals
- Ronnie 'Greystoke' Parker - drums, percussion
- John 'Hambone' Wilson - bass guitar
- Bob Patient - keyboards
