= Between Last Night and Us =

Studio album by The Audreys
- Released: 20 February 2006
- Recorded: June 2005
- Studio: Yikesville Studios, Melbourne, Victoria, Australia
- Genre: Blues, Roots
- Length: 52:05
- Label: ABC/Warner
- Producer: Shane O'Mara, The Audreys

The Audreys chronology
You and Steve McQueen (2005)	Between Last Night and Us (2006)	When the Flood Comes (2008)

Between Last Night and Us is the debut studio album by Australian blues and roots band, The Audreys. The album peaked at number 97 on the ARIA Charts.

At the ARIA Music Awards of 2006 the album won the ARIA Award for Best Blues and Roots Album and its songs were used as the soundtrack for the 2007 ABC TV series, Rain Shadow.

== Track listing ==
All tracks written by Taasha Coates, Danika Coates, Tristan Goodall, except where noted.

1. "You & Steve McQueen" - 3:44
2. "A Little More" (Taasha Coates, Tristan Goodall) - 4:37
3. "Oh Honey" (Taasha Coates, Tristan Goodall) - 4:29
4. "Pale Dress" - 4:55
5. "Banjo and Violin" - 3:03
6. "Long Ride" (Cam Goodall) - 4:34
7. "Nothing Wrong With Me" - 5:41
8. "Where Are You Now?" (Taasha Coates, Tristan Goodall) - 4:39
9. "Susanne" (Taasha Coates, Tristan Goodall) - 4:46
10. "Come On In" - 3:50
11. "Monster" - 3:01
12. "Don't Change" (INXS) - 4:45

== Personnel ==
The Audreys

- Taasha Coates - vocals, melodica, harmonica, ukulele, glockenspiel (10), melodica (5), piano (6, 8, 9, 10)
- Tristan Goodall - national reso-phonic guitar, acoustic guitar, banjo
- Mikey G - violin, mandolin, harmony vocals
- Lyndon Gray - double bass, harmony vocals
- Cameron Goodall - vocals, guitar, 12-string acoustic guitar, banjo

Additional musicians

- Shane O'Mara - bass (10), spaghetti western guitar, sampler (7), drums (9), lap steel guitar (1, 3)
- Howard Cains - double bass (1, 8, 9)
- Rob Eyers - drums
- Rebecca Barnard - vocals on "Pale Dress"

== Charts ==
Chart (2006)	Rank
Australian Albums Chart	97

== Certifications ==
Region	Certification	Certified units/sales
Australia (ARIA)	Gold	35,000^{^}
^{^} Shipments figures based on certification alone.
