= ARIA Award for Best Blues and Roots Album =

Annual Australian music industry award

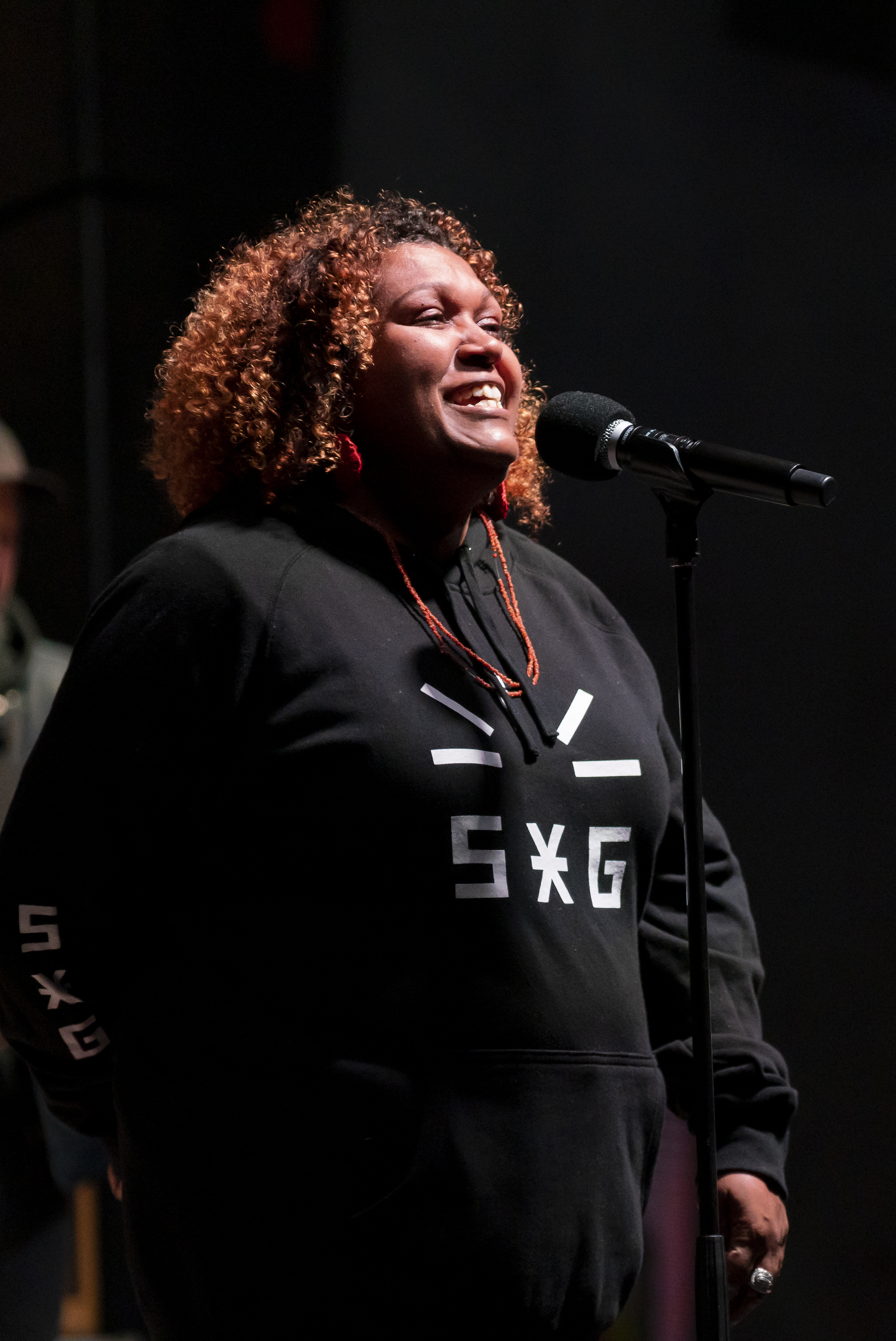
- 2026 winner Emma Donovan
- Country: Australia
- Presented by: Australian Recording Industry Association (ARIA)
- First award: 1999
- Currently held by: Emma Donovan, Take Me to the River (2026)

Highlights
- Most wins: The Teskey Brothers (4)
- Most nominations: Jeff Lang (9)
- Website: ariaawards.com.au

The ARIA Music Award for Best Blues and Roots Album, is an award presented at the annual ARIA Music Awards, which recognises "the many achievements of Aussie artists across all music genres", since 1987. It is handed out by the Australian Recording Industry Association (ARIA), an organisation whose aim is "to advance the interests of the Australian record industry." To be eligible, the recording must be an album in the contemporary and traditional blues genres, and contemporary adaptations of Australian traditional music and/or folklore. The submitted work cannot be entered in other genre categories. The accolade is voted for by a judging school, which comprises between 40 and 100 members of representatives experienced in these genres, and is given to a solo artist or group who is either from Australia or an Australian resident.

The award for Best Blues and Roots Album has been won the most times (4) by the Teskey Brothers, who broke the record previously tied between the Audreys and John Butler Trio, who won three times each, in 2025. Jeff Lang has the most nominations with nine, though John Butler has been nominated eight times as a member of the John Butler Trio and once as a solo artist. Ash Grunwald has the most nominations without a win with six.

== Winners and nominees ==
In the following table, the winner is highlighted in a separate colour, and in boldface; the nominees are those that are not highlighted or in boldface.

Winner marked in a separate colour

Year	Winner(s)	Album title
**1999** (13th)
**1999** (13th)	**David Hole**	**Under the Spell**
**1999** (13th)	Backsliders	Poverty Deluxe
**1999** (13th)	Jeff Lang	Cedar Grove
**1999** (13th)	Kerri Simpson	Confessin' the Blues
**1999** (13th)	Weddings Parties Anything	They Were Better Live
**2000** (14th)
**2000** (14th)	**Matt Walker**	**Soul Witness**
**2000** (14th)	Peter Gelling	Bluestime
**2000** (14th)	Ruby Hunter	Feeling Good
**2000** (14th)	Neil Murray	Wondering Kind
**2000** (14th)	Mick Thomas	Under Starters Orders
**2001** (15th)
**2001** (15th)	**Collard Greens & Gravy**	**More Gravy**
**2001** (15th)	Andy Cowan	10.30pm Thursdays
**2001** (15th)	Jeff Lang	Everything Is Still
**2001** (15th)	The John Butler Trio	Three
**2001** (15th)	The Revelators	The Adventures of The Amazing Revelators
**2002** (16th)
**2002** (16th)	**Jeff Lang and Bob Brozman**	**Rolling Through This World**
**2002** (16th)	Backsliders	Hanoi
**2002** (16th)	Bondi Cigars	Down in the Valley
**2002** (16th)	Dave Steel	Home Is a Hard Thing to Find
**2002** (16th)	Mick Hart	Upside Down in the Full Face of Optimism
**2003** (17th)
**2003** (17th)	**The Waifs**	**Up All Night**
**2003** (17th)	The John Butler Trio	Living
**2003** (17th)	Mia Dyson	Cold Water
**2003** (17th)	Pete Murray	Feeler
**2003** (17th)	The Revelators	The Revelators
**2004** (18th)
**2004** (18th)	**John Butler Trio**	**Sunrise Over Sea**
**2004** (18th)	Ash Grunwald	I Don't Believe
**2004** (18th)	Jim Conway's Big Wheel	Little Story
**2004** (18th)	Xavier Rudd	Solace
**2004** (18th)	Jeff Lang	Whatever Makes You Happy
**2005** (19th)
**2005** (19th)	**Mia Dyson**	**Parking Lots**
**2005** (19th)	Ash Grunwald	Live at the Corner
**2005** (19th)	The Beautiful Girls	We're Already Gone
**2005** (19th)	Jeff Lang	You Have to Dig Deep to Bury Daddy
**2005** (19th)	The Waifs	A Brief History...
**2006** (20th)
**2006** (20th)	**The Audreys**	**Between Last Night and Us**
**2006** (20th)	Bernard Fanning	Tea & Sympathy
**2006** (20th)	Lior	Doorways of My Mind
**2006** (20th)	The Flood	The Late Late Show
**2006** (20th)	Xavier Rudd	Food in the Belly
**2007** (21st)
**2007** (21st)	**The John Butler Trio**	**Grand National**
**2007** (21st)	Ash Grunwald	Give Signs
**2007** (21st)	C. W. Stoneking	King Hokum
**2007** (21st)	Jeff Lang and Chris Whitley	Dislocation Blues
**2007** (21st)	Xavier Rudd	White Moth
**2008** (22nd)
**2008** (22nd)	**The Audreys**	**When the Flood Comes**
**2008** (22nd)	Angus & Julia Stone	A Book Like This
**2008** (22nd)	Jeff Lang	Half Seas Over
**2008** (22nd)	Mia Dyson	Stuck Down
**2008** (22nd)	The Waifs	Sun Dirt Water
**2009** (23rd)
**2009** (23rd)	**C. W. Stoneking**	**Jungle Blues**
**2009** (23rd)	Ash Grunwald	Fish out of Water
**2009** (23rd)	Pete Murray	Chance to Say Goodbye
**2009** (23rd)	The Waifs	Live from the Union of the Soul
**2009** (23rd)	The Wilson Pickers	The Land of the Powerful Owl
**2010** (24th)
**2010** (24th)	**Dan Sultan**	**Get Out While You Can**
**2010** (24th)	Ash Grunwald	Hot Mama Vibes
**2010** (24th)	Jeff Lang	Chimeradour
**2010** (24th)	The John Butler Trio	April Uprising
**2010** (24th)	The Wilson Pickers	Shake It Down
**2011** (25th)
**2011** (25th)	**The Audreys**	**Sometimes the Stars**
**2011** (25th)	Backsliders	Starvation Box
**2011** (25th)	Blue King Brown	Worldwize Part 1 – North & South
**2011** (25th)	The John Butler Trio	Live at Red Rocks
**2011** (25th)	The Waifs	Temptation
**2012** (26th)
**2012** (26th)	**Jeff Lang**	**Carried in Mind**
**2012** (26th)	Angus Stone	Broken Brights
**2012** (26th)	Lanie Lane	To the Horses
**2012** (26th)	Mia Dyson	The Moment
**2012** (26th)	Paul Greene & The Other Colours	Behind the Stars
**2013** (27th)
**2013** (27th)	**Russell Morris**	**Sharkmouth**
**2013** (27th)	Archie Roach	Into the Bloodstream
**2013** (27th)	Mama Kin	The Magician's Daughter
**2013** (27th)	Melbourne Ska Orchestra	Melbourne Ska Orchestra
**2013** (27th)	The Cat Empire	Steal the Light
**2014** (28th)
**2014** (28th)	**John Butler Trio**	**Flesh & Blood**
**2014** (28th)	Harry Hookey	Misdiagnosed
**2014** (28th)	Russell Morris	Van Diemen's Land
**2014** (28th)	The Audreys	'Til My Tears Roll Away
**2014** (28th)	The Bamboos	Fever in the Road
**2015** (29th)
**2015** (29th)	**C. W. Stoneking**	**Gon' Boogaloo**
**2015** (29th)	Marlon Williams	Marlon Williams
**2015** (29th)	The Black Sorrows	Endless Sleep
**2015** (29th)	The Waifs	'Beautiful You
**2015** (29th)	Tim Rogers and The Bamboos	The Rules of Attraction
**2016** (30th)
**2016** (30th)	**Russell Morris**	**Red Dirt Red Heart**
**2016** (30th)	Jimmy Barnes	Soul Searchin'
**2016** (30th)	Kev Carmody	Recollections... Reflections... (A Journey)
**2016** (30th)	The Cat Empire	Rising with the Sun
**2016** (30th)	The Wilson Pickers	You Can't Catch Fish from a Train
**2017** (31st)
**2017** (31st)	**All Our Exes Live in Texas**	**When We Fall**
**2017** (31st)	Archie Roach	Let Love Rule
**2017** (31st)	Busby Marou	Postcards from the Shell House
**2017** (31st)	Paul Kelly & Charlie Owen	Death's Dateless Night
**2017** (31st)	Tash Sultana	Notion
**2018** (32nd)
**2018** (32nd)	**Tash Sultana**	**Flow State**
**2018** (32nd)	Angus & Julia Stone	Snow
**2018** (32nd)	Emily Wurramara	Milyakburra
**2018** (32nd)	Mama Kin Spender	Golden Magnetic
**2018** (32nd)	Ruby Boots	Don't Talk About It
**2019** (33rd)
**2019** (33rd)	**The Teskey Brothers**	**Run Home Slow**
**2019** (33rd)	Dan Sultan	Aviary Takes
**2019** (33rd)	John Butler Trio	Home
**2019** (33rd)	King Gizzard & the Lizard Wizard	Fishing for Fishies
**2019** (33rd)	Paul Kelly	Live at Sydney Opera House
**2020** (34th)
**2020** (34th)	**The Teskey Brothers**	**Live at the Forum**
**2020** (34th)	Busby Marou	The Great Divide
**2020** (34th)	Frank Yamma	Tjukurpa: The Story
**2020** (34th)	Lucky Oceans	Purple Sky (Songs Originally by Hank Williams)
**2020** (34th)	Tracy McNeil & the GoodLife	You Be the Lightning
**2021** (35th)
**2021** (35th)	**Archie Roach**	**The Songs of Charcoal Lane**
**2021** (35th)	Emma Donovan & The Pushbacks	Crossover
**2021** (35th)	Josh Teskey & Ash Grunwald	Push the Blues Away
**2021** (35th)	Martha Marlow	Medicine Man
**2021** (35th)	Ziggy Alberts	Searching for Freedom
**2022** (36th)
**2022** (36th)	**William Crighton**	**Water and Dust**
**2022** (36th)	Charlie Collins	Undone
**2022** (36th)	The Bamboos	Hard Up
**2022** (36th)	The Teskey Brothers with Orchestra Victoria	Live at Hamer Hall
**2022** (36th)	Thornbird	Thornbird
**2023** (37th)
**2023** (37th)	**The Teskey Brothers**	**The Winding Way**
**2023** (37th)	Cash Savage and the Last Drinks	So This Is Love
**2023** (37th)	Katie Wighton	The End
**2023** (37th)	The Bamboos	Live At Hamer Hall With The Melbourne Symphony Orchestra
**2023** (37th)	Ziggy Alberts	Dancing in the Dark
**2024** (38th)
**2024** (38th)	**Mia Dyson**	**Tender Heart**
**2024** (38th)	Checkerboard Lounge	Sun Sessions
**2024** (38th)	Dope Lemon	Kimosabè
**2024** (38th)	Georgia Mooney	Full of Moon
**2024** (38th)	The Paper Kites	At the Roundhouse
**2025** (39th)
**2025** (39th)	**The Teskey Brothers**	**Live at the Hammersmith Apollo**
**2025** (39th)	Dope Lemon	Golden Wolf
**2025** (39th)	Mama Kin Spender	Promises
**2025** (39th)	Sons of the East	Sons
**2025** (39th)	Tash Sultana	Return to the Roots
**2026** (40th)
**2026** (40th)	**Emma Donovan**	**Take Me to the River**
**2026** (40th)	Any Young Mechanic	The Modern Shoe Is Ruining the Foot
**2026** (40th)	John Butler	Prism
**2026** (40th)	William Crighton	Colonial Drift
**2026** (40th)	Xavier Rudd	Freedom Sessions / Where to Now

== Artists with multiple wins ==
4 wins

- The Teskey Brothers

3 wins

- The Audreys
- John Butler Trio

2 wins

- Mia Dyson
- Jeff Lang
- Russell Morris
- C. W. Stoneking

== Artists with multiple nominations ==
9 nominations

- John Butler (Note: Including eight as a member of the John Butler Trio.)
- Jeff Lang

8 nominations

- John Butler Trio

6 nominations

- Ash Grunwald
- Josh Teskey (Note: Including five as a member of the Teskey Brothers.)
- The Waifs

5 nominations

- Mia Dyson
- Angus Stone (Note: Including two as a member of Angus & Julia Stone; also known as Dope Lemon.)
- The Teskey Brothers

4 nominations

- The Audreys
- The Bamboos
- Xavier Rudd

3 nominations

- Backsliders
- Joe Camilleri (Note: Including two as a member of the Revelators and one as a member of the Black Sorrows.)
- Mama Kin (Note: Including two as a member of Mama Kin Spender.)
- Russell Morris
- Archie Roach
- C. W. Stoneking
- Tash Sultana
- The Wilson Pickers

2 nominations

- Ziggy Alberts
- Busby Marou
- The Cat Empire
- William Crighton
- Emma Donovan
- Paul Kelly
- Mama Kin Spender
- Georgia Mooney (Note: Including one as a member of All Our Exes Live in Texas.)
- Pete Murray
- The Revelators
- Angus & Julia Stone
- Dan Sultan
- Mick Thomas (Note: Including one as a member of Weddings Parties Anything.)
- Katie Wighton
