= The Audreys =

Australian blues and roots band

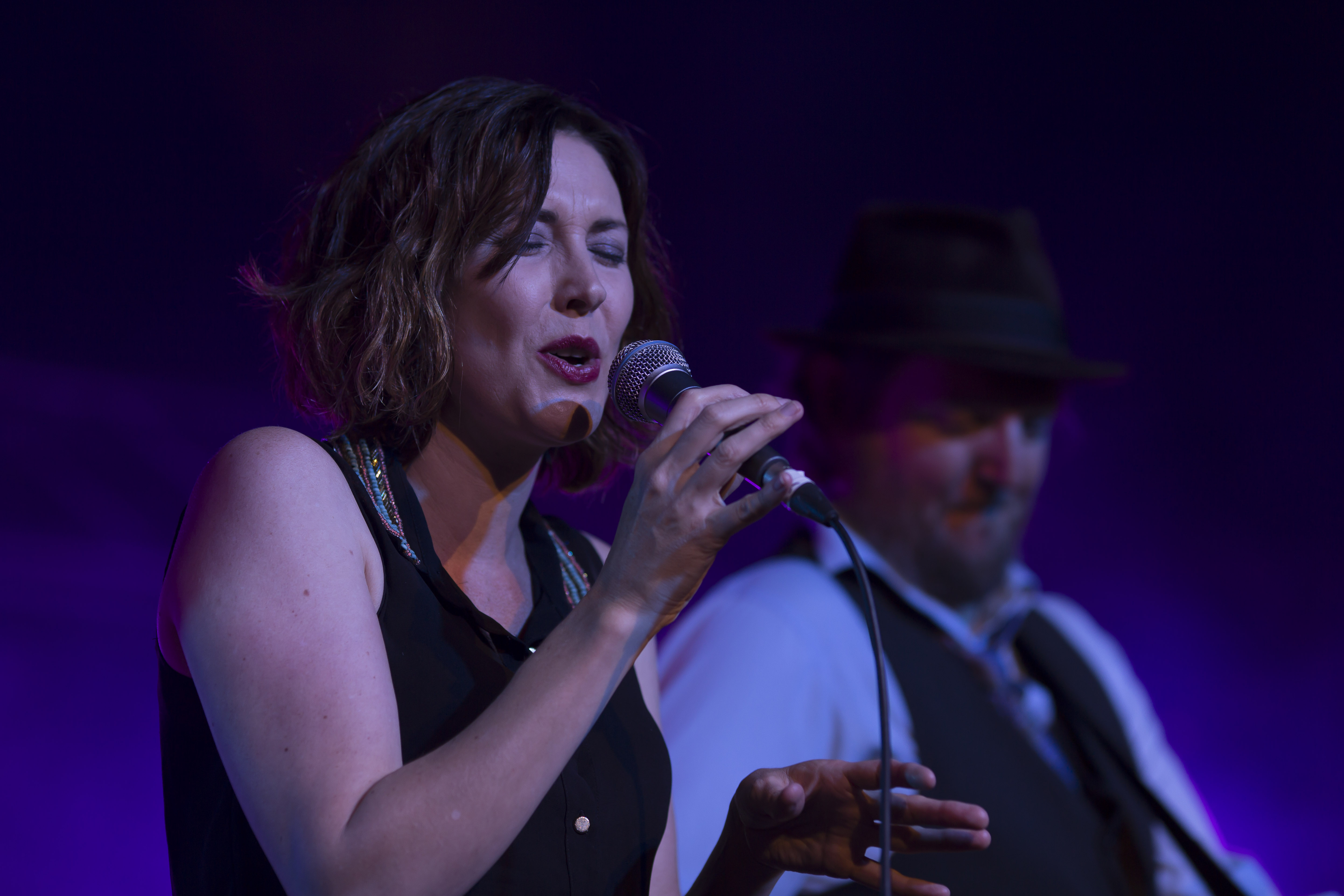
- The Audreys performing in 2015

Background information
- Origin: Adelaide, South Australia, Australia
- Genres: Blues; roots
- Years active: 2004–present
- Label: ABC
- Members: Taasha Coates
- Past members: Tristan Goodall; Cameron Goodall; Michael Green
- Website: theaudreys.com.au

The Audreys are an Australian blues and roots band which formed in Adelaide, in 2004 by founding mainstay, Taasha Coates on lead vocals, melodica, harmonica and ukulele. They have released four studio albums, Between Last Night and Us (February 2006), When the Flood Comes (April 2008), Sometimes the Stars (October 2010) and 'Til My Tears Roll Away (March 2014). Founding guitarist Tristan Goodall died on 2 July 2022, aged 48, of an unspecified illness.

== Biography ==
=== 2004–2005: Foundation and early years ===
A precursor to the Audreys started in Melbourne as a duo consisting of lead singer Taasha Coates and guitarist Tristan Goodall. Goodall had been a member of a band, the Milk, in Adelaide, from the early to mid-1990s. The pair had met in 1997 as university students in Adelaide. After finishing tertiary studies they moved to Melbourne where the duo played original pop songs and slowed-down cover versions of 1980s songs. An impromptu jam session with a bluegrass band at a winery in the Macedon Ranges, in mid-2003 inspired them to change direction from pop to folk and blues.

The duo moved back to Adelaide, where they formed the Audreys in 2004 and first performed in June of that year. The original line-up had Coates on lead vocals, melodica, harmonica and ukulele, Cameron Goodall on guitar, bass guitar and backing vocals, his brother Tristan Goodall on guitar and banjo and Michael Green (a.k.a. Mikey G) on violin, lap steel guitar and backing vocals. The group self-released a five-track extended play, You & Steve McQueen in 2005. It provided the singles, "Oh Honey" and "You & Steve McQueen". Australian musicologist, Ian McFarlane, described their sound, "a tuneful blend of alt-country and folk rock that had parallels with other roots rock acts" specifying fellow Australians, the Waifs, Claire Bowditch, Angus & Julia Stone and Mama Kin.

=== 2006–2009: Between Last Night and Us & When the Flood Comes ===
The band's debut album Between Last Night and Us was released in February 2006, and featured the singles "Banjo & Violin", "Oh Honey" and "You and Steve McQueen". At the ARIA Music Awards of 2006, Between Last Night And Us won the ARIA Award for Best Blues and Roots Album, and its songs were used as the soundtrack for the 2007 ABC TV series, Rain Shadow.

Their second album, When the Flood Comes, was released in April 2008, and at the ARIA Music Awards of 2008 it won the ARIA Award for Best Blues and Roots Album. The album featured the single "Paradise City". Tracks "Small Things" and "Lay Me Down" have been included on movie and television program soundtracks both in Australia and the USA. "Small Things" was used as soundtrack music in the November 2010 episode of Neighbours, when Steph Scully was sentenced to 6 years in jail for the death of Ringo Brown. "Small Things" was also featured in an episode of the US series One Tree Hill.

The band have appeared at Australian festivals such as Bluesfest, WOMADelaide, Groovin' the Moo, Tamworth, Queenscliff Music Festival, Bass in the Grass, A Day on the Green, Woodford Folk Festival, Red Hill Harvest Festival, Port Fairy Folk Festival, The Great Escape, The East Coast Blues & Roots Music Festival, Southbound, Mossvale Music Festival, Great Southern Blues & Rockabilly Festival, The Falls Festival and the Adelaide leg of the Big Day Out in 2007. They have also toured overseas, including shows in the United States, Canada, the United Kingdom, France and Russia.

=== 2010–2015: Sometimes the Stars & Til My Tears Roll Away ===
Following the departure of Cameron Goodall and Michael Green, Taasha Coates and Tristan Goodall continued as a duo and recorded their third album. The album included work from Tim Rogers, jazz pianist Paul Grabowsky, members of Tripod, and Michael Barker of the John Butler Trio. The duo once again worked under the guidance of producer, engineer and friend Shane O'Mara.

In October 2010, The Audreys released their third album, titled Sometimes the Stars, which debuted at #28 on the ARIA charts. Following the release of the album, The Audreys toured throughout Australia in October, November and December 2010. At the ARIA Music Awards of 2011, the group won their third ARIA award for Best Blues and Roots Album.

In March 2012, a 3-CD box set called Collected was released, featuring the first three studio albums. The digital version included seven bonus tracks, including the song "Train Wreck Blues", which was released as a single.

In March 2014, the group released their fourth album 'Til My Tears Roll Away, which peaked at number 32 on the ARIA Charts. The album was preceded by the lead single "My Darlin' Girl" in January 2014. At the ARIA Music Awards of 2014, the band were again nominated for Best Blues and Roots Album.

=== 2016–2023: solo work ===
In 2016, Taasha Coates released her first solo record Taasha Coates and her Melancholy Sweethearts through ABC Music and produced by fellow Australian producer Shane Nicholson. The first single and video for the album was "This House Is Gonna Burn", a song about domestic violence. Overall the record has a harder edge than most of the material Taasha penned in the Audreys, though the artistic and thematic through lines are quite clear. Songs from the album are featured prominently in the ABC miniseries Pulse.

Taasha lives in the Adelaide Hills with her two children. Tristan resided in Brisbane, and the Audreys still play often around Australia.

On 16 September 2021, the band announced via their Facebook page that Tristan Goodall had "retired permanently from playing and touring" but that Coates had "created a new line-up to continue what we started" with his blessing, with more details to be announced subsequently.

In July 2022, the Audreys announced via their Facebook page that Tristan Goodall had died on 2 July 2022, aged 48. He had been too ill to tour for the previous two years. Coates declared: "I have to say goodbye to my dearest friend, my musical soulmate, and my grief is almost unbearable."

=== 2024–present: Ruin & Repair ===
In November 2024, the group released "Secondhand Boots", their first single in ten years. In January 2025 the group announced the release of Ruin & Repair for March 2025.

== Members ==
The band members are:

- Taasha Coates – vocals, keyboards, melodica, harmonica, ukulele, guitar

Current touring members:

- Tom Kneebone – Acoustic and electric guitars, vocals
- Flik Freeman – bass
- Beej Barker – drums

Previous members:

- Tristan Goodall – Acoustic and electric guitars, banjo
- Shane O'Mara – electric guitar
- Rick Plant – bass
- Ben Wiesner- drums
- Michael Green – violin, vocals, lap steel
- Toby Lang – drums, vocals
- Lyndon Gray – double bass, vocals
- Cameron Goodall – vocals, guitars, mandocello
- David Ross MacDonald – drums
- Grant Cummerford – bass
- Brett Canning – bass, vocals
- John (Bedge) Bedggood- keys, violin, vocals

== Discography ==
=== Studio albums ===
List of studio albums, with selected chart positions and certifications
Title	Album details	Peak chart positions	Certifications
Title	Album details	AUS	Certifications
Between Last Night And Us	Released: 2006; Label: ABC Roots/ Warner; Formats: CD, LP	97	ARIA: Gold
When the Flood Comes	Released: 18 April 2008; Label: Kybosh Records/ ABC/ Warner; Formats: CD, Digital download, LP	20	
Sometimes the Stars	Released: October 2010; Label: ABC Music; Formats: CD, Digital download, LP	28	
'Til My Tears Roll Away	Released: 14 March 2014; Label: ABC Music; Formats: CD, Digital download, LP	32	
Ruin & Repair	Released: 21 March 2025; Label: The Audreys; Formats: CD, Digital download, LP	TBA	

=== Compilations ===
List of compilation with selected details
Title	album details
Collected	Released: March 2012; Label: ABC Music (2796242); Formats: 3xCD, Digital download; Includes the first three studio albums

=== EPs ===
List of EP with selected details
Title	EP details
You and Steve McQueen	Released: 2005; Label: The Audreys; Formats: CD

=== Singles ===
Title	Year	Album
"Oh Honey"	2005	You and Steve McQueen
"You and Steve McQueen"	2005	You and Steve McQueen
"Banjo and Violin"	2006	Between Last Night and Us
"Don't Change"	2006	Between Last Night and Us
"Small Things"	2008	When the Flood Comes
"Paradise City"	2008	When the Flood Comes
"Trouble Somehow"	2010	Sometimes the Stars
"Sometimes the Stars"	2010	Sometimes the Stars
"Lonesome Valley"	2011	Sometimes the Stars
"Track Wreck Blues"	2012	Collected
"My Darlin' Girl"	2014	'Til My Tears Roll Away
"Baby Are You There?"	2014	'Til My Tears Roll Away
"Secondhand Boots"	2024	TBA

== Awards ==
=== ARIA Music Awards ===
The ARIA Music Awards is an annual awards ceremony that recognises excellence, innovation, and achievement across all genres of Australian music. The Audreys have been nominated for four awards and have won three.

Year	Nominee / work	Award	Result
2006	Between Last Night and Us	Best Blues & Roots Album	Won
2008	When the Flood Comes	Best Blues & Roots Album	Won
2011	Sometimes the Stars	Best Blues & Roots Album	Won
2014	'Til My Tears Roll Away	Best Blues & Roots Album	Nominated

=== Fowler's Live Music Awards ===
The Fowler's Live Music Awards took place from 2012 to 2014 to "recognise success and achievement over the past 12 months [and] celebrate the great diversity of original live music" in South Australia. Since 2015 they're known as the South Australian Music Awards.

Year	Nominee / work	Award	Result (wins only)
2012	Audreys	Best Acoustic Artist	Won
