= Shane O'Mara (musician) =

- Origin: Australia
- Occupations: Musician, record producer

Shane O'Mara is an Australian musician and record producer.

He worked with Stephen Cummings as a member of Stephen Cummings' Lovetown, Good Humour and the Stephen Cummings Band and co-produced the albums A New Kind of Blue (1989), Good Humour (1991) and Unguided Tour (1992). He played with Chris Wilson in the Chris Wilson Band which released an EP, The Big One, in May and a studio album, Landlocked, in June 1992, and he backed Wilson in Live at the Continental (October 1994).

He formed Rebecca's Empire with then partner Rebecca Barnard (also part of Cumming's backing bands). They released two albums, Way of All Things (1996) and Welcome (1999) (both produced by O'Mara) before breaking up in 2000. O'Mara supported Barnards solo career, co producing Fortified (2006) and assisting with the recording of Everlasting (2010). In the mid 90s he joined Paul Kelly's Band. He left in 1997 and joined Tim Rogers and the Temperance Union. In 1998 he was part of the Singers For The Red Black & Gold who released a cover of "Yil Lull" which was nominated for the ARIA Award for Best Indigenous Release. O'Mara produced the music for Stone Bros. and had five solo tracks on the soundtrack album. Along with Paul Kelly and members of Professor Ratbaggy he provided the soundtrack to Lantana. This earned him an ARIA Award for Best Original Soundtrack Album in 2002. In 2006, O'Mara co-produced Rebecca Barnard's debut solo album "Fortified". He produced The Audreys albums When the Flood Comes and Sometimes The Stars which won the 2008 and 2011 ARIA Awards for Best Blues and Roots Album and coproduced their album Between Last Night and Us which won the same award in 2006.

== Awards and nominations ==
=== ARIA Music Awards ===
The ARIA Music Awards is an annual awards ceremony held by the Australian Recording Industry Association. They commenced in 1987.

Year	Nominee / work	Award	Result	Ref.
2002	Lantana	Best Original Soundtrack	Won	
