= Jo Jo Zep and the Falcons discography =

- Studio albums: 8
- EPs: 3
- Live albums: 3
- Compilation albums: 3
- Singles: 18

Jo Jo Zep and the Falcons are an Australian blues, rock and R&B band. The band released eight studio albums. The band were inducted into the ARIA Hall of Fame in 2007.

== Albums ==
=== Studio albums ===
List of albums, with selected chart positions
| Title | Details | Peak chart positions | |
| Title | Details | AUS | NZ |
|---|---|---|---|
| Don't Waste It | Released: February 1977; Label: Oz (OZS-1003); Format: LP | 37 | — |
| Whip It Out | Released: October 1977; Label: Oz (OZS-1004); Format: LP | 98 | — |
| So Young | Released: November 1978; Label: Oz (OZE-1002); Format: Mini-LP (7 tracks) | 80 | — |
| Screaming Targets | Released: July 1979; Label: Mushroom (L 36973); Format: LP | 13 | 25 |
| Hats Off Step Lively | Released: August 1980; Label: Mushroom (L 37321); Format: LP | 17 | — |
| Dexterity | Released: July 1981; Label: Mushroom (L 20002); Format: Mini-LP (9 tracks on 10" vinyl) | 92 | — |
| Cha (as Jo Jo Zep) | Released: November 1982; Label: Mushroom (L 37886); Format: LP | 28 | 33 |
| Ricochet | Released: 22 September 2003; Label: Zep; Format: CD | — | — |
"—" denotes a recording that did not chart or was not released in that territory.

=== Re-issued albums ===
| Title | Details |
|---|---|
| Step Lively | Released: September 1981; International re-issue of Hats Off Step Lively; Label: WEA (WEA 99 168) / Columbia (37047) |

=== Compilation albums ===
| Title | Details | Peak chart positions | |
| Title | Details | AUS | NZ |
|---|---|---|---|
| Takin' the Wraps Off | Released: 1980; Label: Rockburgh (ROCD 110); Format: LP (2 discs, second disc is live) | — | — |
| The Sound of Jo Jo Zep & The Falcons | Released: December 1983; Label: Mushroom (RML 53117); Format: LP, CD | 89 | — |
| Shape I'm In: The Complete Anthology | Released: 1997; Label: Mushroom (MUSH33050 2); Format: 2xCD | — | — |
| The Best of Jo Jo Zep & The Falcons | Released: 13 July 2007; Label: Warner Bros. Australia (5144224252); Format: CD | — | — |
"—" denotes a recording that did not chart or was not released in that territory.

== Live albums and EPs ==
| Title | Details | Peak chart positions |
| Title | Details | AUS |
|---|---|---|
| Live!! Loud and Clear | Released: February 1978; Label: Oz (OZEP-001); Format: 12" vinyl EP (5 tracks); Limited to 5,000 copies. | 53 |
| Let's Drip Awhile | Released: early 1979; Label: Oz/EMI (OZS-1013); Format: LP | 85 |
| Live at San Remo NYE 1976 | Released: 1 June 2020; Label: Dave Ridoutt, Black Box / MGM Distribution; Format: CD (limited), DD, streaming | — |
"—" denotes a recording that did not chart or was not released in that territory.

== Singles ==
| Year | Title | Peak chart positions | | Album |
| Year | Title | AUS | NZ | Album |
|---|---|---|---|---|
| 1975 | "Run Rudolph Run" (as Jo Jo Zep and His Little Helpers)^{[A]} | — | — | Non-album single |
| 1976 | "Beating Around the Bush" | 73 | — | Oz – A Rock 'n' Roll Road Movie – Soundtrack |
| 1976 | "Security" | 98 | — | Don't Waste It |
| 1977 | "If It's Love That You Want Darlin'" | — | — | Don't Waste It |
| 1977 | "(I'm in a) Dancing Mood" | 90 | — | Whip It Out |
| 1978 | "Honey Dripper" | — | — | Live!! Loud and Clear |
| 1978 | "So Young" | 48 | — | So Young |
| 1979 | "Hit and Run" | 12 | — | Screaming Targets |
| 1979 | "Shape I'm In" | 22 | 41 | Screaming Targets |
| 1980 | "All I Wanna Do" | 34 | — | Hats Off Step Lively |
| 1980 | "Puppet on a String" | 53 | — | Hats Off Step Lively |
| 1980 | "I Will Return" | 91 | — | Hats Off Step Lively |
| 1981 | "Sweet" | — | — | Dexterity |
| 1981 | "But It's Alright" (US release) | — | — | Step Lively (North American issue only) |
| 1981 | "Gimme Little Sign" (US release) | — | — | Step Lively (North American issue only) |
| 1982 | "Taxi Mary" (as Jo Jo Zep)^{[B]} | 11 | — | Cha |
| 1982 | "Walk On By" (as Jo Jo Zep)^{[B]} | 55 | 6 | Cha |
| 1983 | "Losing Game" | — | — | Cha (re-release) |
| 1984 | "Shape I'm In" (live) | — | — | Sound of Jo Jo Zep and the Falcons |
"—" denotes a recording that did not chart or was not released in that territory.

== Notes ==
A. "Run Rudolph Run" was recorded by Joe Camilleri (aka Jo Jo Zep), John Power and studio musicians for a one-off Christmas single. It was performed on Countdown – the Australian national TV pop music series. For this TV performance, Camilleri and Power were joined by Jeff Burstin and John McInerney.
B. Jo Jo Zep and the Falcons disbanded in June 1981, Camilleri recorded Cha and the related singles with Jeff Burstin and Simon Gyllies under the name Jo Jo Zep.
