= The Best of Jo Jo Zep & The Falcons =

Greatest hits album by Jo Jo Zep and the Falcons
- Released: 14 July 2007
- Recorded: 1976–1982
- Genres: Pop; pop rock; rock
- Label: Warner Music Australia
- Producers: Peter Solley; Joe Camilleri; Ross Wilson; Eddie Rayner

Jo Jo Zep and the Falcons chronology
Ricochet (2003)	The Best of Jo Jo Zep & The Falcons (2007)

The Best of Jo Jo Zep & The Falcons (subtitled I'm in a Dancing Mood) is a greatest hits album by Australian blues, rock and R&B group, Jo Jo Zep and the Falcons. It was released in July 2007 to coincide with announcement of the group's ARIA Hall of Fame induction.

== Background and release ==
In 1975, Joe Camilleri joined Wayne Burt, Jeff Burstin, John Power and Gary Young to record a version of "Run Rudolph Run" as a Christmas single produced by Ross Wilson. After recording the albums Don't Waste It, Whip It Out, Live!! Loud and Clear and So Young for Oz Records, the band found themselves at Mushroom Records. Wayne Burt had left and replaced by Tony Faehse, Wilbur Wilde also joined the band. The label move and producer Peter Solley oversaw the hit singles "Hit & Run", "Shape I'm In" and "All I Wanna Do" and the albums Screaming Targets, Hats Off Step Lively and (Dexterity. The band toured overseas and even got to play at the Montreux Jazz Festival. Cha was released simply as Jo Jo Zep, and the band officially broke up in 1984.

== Track listing ==
No.	Title	Writer(s)	Album	Length
1.	"So Young"	Joe Camilleri; Jeff Burstin; Tony Faehse	So Young	3:41
2.	"All I Wanna Do"	Malcolm Lilley; Cook	Hats Off Step Lively	3:01
3.	"Shape I'm In"	Camilleri; Burstin; Faehse	Screaming Targets	3:32
4.	"Puppet on a String"	Camilleri; Burstin; Faehse	Hats Off Step Lively	3:32
5.	"Hit and Run"	Camilleri; Burstin; Faehse	Screaming Targets	4:37
6.	"I'm in a Dancing Mood"	Delroy Wilson	Whip It Out	3:26
7.	"Losing Game"	Camilleri; Simon Gyllies; Clake	Cha	5:17
8.	"Taxi Mary"	Camilleri; Burstin; Faehse	Cha	3:57
9.	"Security"	Otis Redding	Don't Waste It	2:54
10.	"Don't Wanna Come Down"	Camilleri; Burstin; Faehse	Screaming Targets	3:29
11.	"I Will Return"	Camilleri; Jeff Burstin; Tony Faehse	Hats Off Step Lively	3:17
12.	"The Honeydripper"	Joe Liggins	Live!! Loud and Clear	4:36
13.	"Dancing Shoes"	Wayne Burt	Don't Waste It	5:03
14.	"Girl Across The Street (Just Turned 18)"	Gary Young	Whip It Out	5:12
15.	"Young Girl"	Don Covay	Live!! Loud and Clear	3:08
16.	"Walk On By"	Burt Bacharach; Hal David	Cha	3:45
17.	"Sherrie"	Camilleri; Paul Kelly	Cha	3:45
18.	"Nosey Parker"			3:14

== Release history ==
Region	Date	Format	Edition(s)	Label	Catalogue
Australia	14 July 2007	CD	Standard	Warner Music Australia	5144224252
United States	23 July 2007	CD	Standard	Festival Records	B000SSGUK8
