= The Sound of Jo Jo Zep & The Falcons =

Greatest hits album by Jo Jo Zep & The Falcons
- Released: December 1983
- Recorded: 1976–1982
- Genre: Pop, pop rock, rock
- Label: Mushroom
- Producer: Peter Solley, Joe Camilleri, Ross Wilson, Eddie Rayner

Jo Jo Zep & The Falcons chronology
Cha (1982)	The Sound of Jo Jo Zep & The Falcons (1983)	Shape I'm In: The Complete Anthology (1997)

The Sound of Jo Jo Zep & The Falcons is the first greatest hits album by Australian Blues, rock and R&B band, Jo Jo Zep & The Falcons.

== Track listing ==
Side A
No.	Title	Writer(s)	Album	Length
1.	"The Honeydripper"	Joe Liggins	Live!! Loud and Clear	4:01
2.	"Dancing Shoes"	Wayne Burt	Don't Waste It	5:03
3.	"Security"	Otis Redding	Don't Waste It	2:53
4.	"I Will Return"	Joe Camilleri; Jeff Burstin; Tony Faehse	Hats Off Step Lively	3:20
5.	"All I Wanna Do"	Malcolm Lilley; Cook	Hats Off Step Lively	3:04
6.	"Sweet"	Camilleri; Burstin; Faehse	Dexterity	3:44
7.	"So Young"	Camilleri; Burstin; Faehse	So Young	3:55

Side B
No.	Title	Writer(s)	Album	Length
1.	"Losing Game"	Camilleri; Simon Gyllies; Clake	Cha	5:16
2.	"Shape I'm In"	Camilleri; Burstin; Faehse	Screaming Targets	3:31
3.	"Hit and Run"	Camilleri; Burstin; Faehse	Screaming Targets	3:44
4.	"Puppet on a String"	Camilleri; Burstin; Faehse	Hats Off Step Lively	3:32
5.	"Walk On By"	Burt Bacharach; Hal David	Cha	3:49
6.	"Taxi Mary"	Camilleri; Burstin; Faehse	Cha	3:59
7.	"Sherrie"	Camilleri; Paul Kelly	Cha	3:39

== Charts ==
Chart (1983/84)	Peak position
Australian Kent Music Report	89

== Release history ==
Region	Date	Format	Edition(s)	Label	Catalogue
Australia	1983	Vinyl Record	Standard	Mushroom Records	L-38079
