= Wayne Burt =

Australian rock and blues guitarist, singer and songwriter

- Born: Wayne Geoffrey Burt
- Origin: Melbourne, Victoria, Australia
- Genres: Rock; blues; rhythm and blues
- Occupations: Guitarist; singer; songwriter
- Instruments: Guitar; vocals
- Formerly of: Daddy Cool; Jo Jo Zep and the Falcons; the Black Sorrows; the Hornets

Wayne Geoffrey Burt is an Australian rock, blues and rhythm and blues guitarist, singer and songwriter, active in the pub-rock scene from the early 1970s. He was a member of the final line-up of Daddy Cool and a founding member and principal songwriter of Jo Jo Zep and the Falcons, which were inducted into the ARIA Hall of Fame in 2007.

== Career ==
=== Rock Granite and the Profiles ===
Burt began performing in Melbourne in the early 1970s with Rock Granite and the Profiles, a group from the city's inner-suburban Carlton scene, appearing alongside contemporaries Daddy Cool and Chain. Rock Granite's track, "You Got Me Where You Want Me", was released in 2014 on a various artists' compilation When the Sun Sets over Carlton: Melbourne's Countercultural Inner City Rock Scene of the '70s via Warner Music Australia. Also in Rock Granite with Burt was Pat Wilson (then-married to Ross Wilson of Daddy Cool).

=== Daddy Cool ===
Burt joined Daddy Cool as a guitarist in 1975. After bass guitarist Wayne Duncan was injured in a car accident, founding mainstay Ross Hannaford switched to bass guitar and Burt was brought in on lead guitar, establishing the band's final line-up before it disbanded in September 1975.

=== Jo Jo Zep and the Falcons ===
Later in 1975, Burt was a founding member of Jo Jo Zep and the Falcons, formed with Joe Camilleri, Jeff Burstin, John Power and Gary Young. He was a guitarist, vocalist and the band's principal songwriter in its early years. Australian music journalist, Ed Nimmervoll described how Burt "wrote great songs in that r&b/soul idiom that was the Falcons' stock and trade in the beginning." He wrote and sang its debut single, "Beating Around the Bush" (1976), which reached No. 73 on the Kent Music Report singles chart. Both "Beating Around the Bush" and "Glad I'm Living Here" featured on the soundtrack of the 1976 Australian film Oz – A Rock 'n' Roll Road Movie. He wrote much of their debut album Don't Waste It (1977) and contributed tracks to second album, Whip It Out (1977) before leaving the band later that year. In 2007 Jo Jo Zep and the Falcons were inducted into the ARIA Hall of Fame.

=== Later work ===
After leaving the Falcons, Burt led Wayne Burt's Sneakers and played with the R&B group the Fabulaires, which had relocated from Adelaide to Melbourne. In 1984 he joined the blues and R&B band, the Black Sorrows, reconnecting with their founding member, Camilleri. Since 1999 he has performed with the Melbourne blues band the Hornets.

== Songwriting for other artists ==
Burt's songs have been recorded by other Australian artists. James Reyne released Burt's "Red Light Avenue" as the lead single from his 1994 album The Whiff of Bedlam, reaching the top 20 of the ARIA singles chart. The vocal duo Vika and Linda recorded two Burt compositions on their No. 7-charting self-titled debut album (1994): "House of Love", released as a single, and "Love This Time". Burt also wrote "Heart Broken", recorded by Anne Kilpatrick, and wrote and performed "Blood on the Highway" for Camilleri's project, Bakelite Radio.

== Selected songwriting credits ==
- "Beating Around the Bush" (1976) — Jo Jo Zep and the Falcons
- "Glad I'm Living Here" (1976) — Jo Jo Zep and the Falcons
- "Dancing Shoes" (1977) — Jo Jo Zep and the Falcons
- "Rough 'n' Ready" (1977) — Jo Jo Zep and the Falcons
- "Cry Cry Cry" (1977) — Jo Jo Zep and the Falcons
- "We're All in the Same Boat" (1977) — Jo Jo Zep and the Falcons
- "House of Love" (1994) — Vika and Linda
- "Love This Time" (1994) — Vika and Linda
- "Red Light Avenue" (1994) — James Reyne
