= So Young =

So Young may refer to:

- So-young, Korean given name
- So Young (film), 2013 Chinese film directed by Zhao Wei
- So Young (album), 1978 album by Australian band Jo Jo Zep & The Falcons

== Songs ==
- "So Young" (Jo Jo Zep & The Falcons song), 1978 song by Australian band Jo Jo Zep & The Falcons
- "So Young" (The Stone Roses song), 1985 song by English band The Stone Roses
- "So Young" (Suede song), 1993 song by English band Suede
- "So Young" (The Corrs song), 1998 song by Irish band The Corrs
- I'm So Young", 1958 song

== See also ==
- Yoo So-young (b. 1986), South Korean actress and former singer also known as Soyoung
