= Joy Dunstan =

Australian actress (born 1951)

- Born: 20 July 1951 (age 75); Australia
- Occupations: Film and television actress
- Years active: 1976–1985
- Spouse: Stephen Smithyman

Joy Dunstan (born 20 July 1951) is an Australian retired film and television actress. She is best remembered as the teenage star of Chris Löfvén's 1976 film Oz, a modern-day remake of the 1939 film The Wizard of Oz, with Graham Matters, Bruce Spence, Gary Waddell, and Robin Ramsay.

== Career ==
The then-25-year-old former school teacher and part-time cabaret dancer had been working in a musical comedy act at Melbourne's Flying Trapeze Cafe when she was discovered by director Chris Löfvén. Löfvén, in offering the part to Dunstan, had said to her "Come with me and I'll make you a star". Dunstan replied "I don't believe it, but yes". She had no prior experience in film or photographic modeling prior to the film.

She also had minor roles in the 1983 television film A Descant for Gossips, and in the cult soap opera Prisoner, in which she portrayed two characters, Penny Seymour in 1982, and Marnie Taylor in 1985. She also had a very minor role in a 1985 episode of Neighbours, which was her last performance, with her reportedly "having grown disillusioned with the business", and she retired soon after.

According to a Film Buffs Podcast interview on 21 November 2006, Dunstan then lived in the United Kingdom. During that interview, songwriter and musician Gary Young discussed his memories of working with Dunstan on the film. Young also claimed that following the film, his band, the Rockin' Emus, released its sole album with one of the songs he had written, “Beautiful Joy,” having been about the actress.
