= Step Lively (album) =

Studio album (reissue) by Jo Jo Zep & The Falcons
- Released: September 1981
- Genre: Rock, pop, blues rock
- Label: WEA, Columbia
- Producer: Peter Solley

Jo Jo Zep & The Falcons chronology
| Dexterity (1981) | Step Lively (1981) | Cha (1982) |

Singles from Step Lively
- 1. "But It's Alright" Released: August 1981; 2. "Gimme Little Sign" Released: October 1981

Step Lively is a reissue of Hats Off Step Lively, the fifth studio album by Australian blues/rock band Jo Jo Zep & The Falcons. The album was released in North America and Europe in September 1981.

== Background and release ==
Jo Jo Zep & The Falcons released their fifth studio album Hats Off Step Lively in Australia in August 1980. The album peaked at number 17 on the Australian Kent Music Report. The band began touring internationally including performances in The Bottom Line club in New York, and at the Montreux Jazz & Blues Festival. Increased tensions within the group led to members Gary Young and John Power leaving the band by June 1981. The album was released in September 1981, but with the band no longer together, the album was not promoted and was a commercial failure.

In 2007, band member Joe Camilleri said "We could have done it if we'd kept punching, but the band actually disintegrated, basically, looking back, because we were too tired". We should have just taken a year off. But what happened was we were right at the end of the period when, in order to flog a record in the States, you were virtually out promoting the one you had out the year before. So it was a totally asynchronous situation. We were having to dig into what we viewed as archives when we went out of the country."

== Reception ==
Professional ratings
Review scores
| Source | Rating |
|---|---|
| AllMusic | 4.5/5 stars |

Carly Darling from Billboard said; "On the group's second US album, Step Lively, the infectious sound staked out on last year's Screaming Targets is honed and refined." adding "The listener is in for one of the hottest sleeper albums of the year"... "From the heavy metal/funk rave-up of "Sweet Honey Sweet" and the Latin tinge of "Too Hot" to the summer breeze effervesces of "P.T", Jo Jo Zep & The Falcons create their own persona." Darling commented that all of the songs are of the "boy meets girl/boy loves girl" variety, but each are "handled in their own way" but added "for sheer good time grace, nothing on the album beats "Puppet on a String".

== Track listing ==
Side A
| No. | Title | Writer(s) | Length |
|---|---|---|---|
| 1. | "But It's Alright" | J.J. Jackson, Pierre Tubbs | 2:53 |
| 2. | "Sweet Honey Sweet" | Joe Camilleri, Jeff Burstin, Tony Faehse | 3:42 |
| 3. | "Tighten Up" | Camilleri, Burstin, Faehse | 3:22 |
| 4. | "All I Wanna Do" | L. Cook | 3:04 |
| 5. | "Fool Enough" | Wayne Burt | 3:32 |
| 6. | "P.T" | Camilleri, Burstin, Faehse | 3:40 |

Side B
| No. | Title | Writer(s) | Length |
|---|---|---|---|
| 1. | "Gimme Little Sign" | Alfred Smith, Joe Hooven, Jerry Winn | 2:35 |
| 2. | "Keep It Up" | Camilleri, Burstin, Faehse | 3:46 |
| 3. | "Too Hot" | Camilleri, Burstin, Faehse | 2:33 |
| 4. | "Puppet on a String" | Camilleri, Burstin, Faehse | 3:30 |
| 5. | "Rudy" | Camilleri, Burstin, Faehse | 4:33 |
| 6. | "Rub Up, Push Up" | Justin Hinds | 3:05 |
