= Let's Drip Awhile =

Live album by Jo Jo Zep & The Falcons
- Released: Early 1979
- Recorded: Martini's 23 December 1977
- Genre: Rock, pop, new wave
- Length: 46:57
- Label: Oz Records
- Producer: Joe Camilleri

Jo Jo Zep & The Falcons chronology
So Young (1978)	Let's Drip Awhile (1979)	Screaming Targets (1979)

Let's Drip Awhile is the second live album by Australian blues and rock band Jo Jo Zep & The Falcons and released early in 1979. The album peaked at number 85 on the Australian Kent Music Report in July 1979. It was the band's final release on Oz Records.

The album is an expansion of the band's EP (and first live album release), Live!! Loud and Clear, released in February 1978.

== Track listing ==
Side A
No.	Title	Writer(s)	Length
1.	"Route 66"	Bobby Troup	2:45
2.	"Honey Dripper"	Joe Liggins	4:02
3.	"I'm a Madman"	Gary Young	2:49
4.	"Ain't Got No Money"	Frankie Miller	3:17
5.	"Yes Indeed"	Burt	3:50
6.	"Young Girl"	Don Covey	3:03
7.	"Down the Road Apiece"	Don Raye	2:45

Side B
No.	Title	Writer(s)	Length
1.	"King of Fools"	Wayne Burt	8:10
2.	"The Girl Across The Street"	Young	5:08
3.	"Show Ya' Fun"	Camilleri	2:06
4.	"Riding in the Moonlight"	Joe Camilleri	2:35
5.	"One More Mile"	Darryl Cotton	6:10

== Charts ==
Chart (1979)	Peak position
Australian Kent Music Report	85
