= Foot in the Door (album) =

Studio album by The Russell Morris Band
- Released: 1979
- Recorded: Armstrong Studios, Melbourne; Australia (1978-1979)
- Genre: Pop rock
- Label: Mushroom Records
- Producer: Peter Solley, Russell Morris, Ernie Rose, Ralph Moss

The Russell Morris Band chronology
Retrospective (1978)	Foot in the Door (1979)	Almost Frantic (1980)

Alternative cover
- 2014 Compact Disc cover

"Foot in the Door" is the fourth studio album by Australian singer songwriter Russell Morris. It was credited to The Russell Morris Band. Two singles were released from the album throughout 1979, with "Hot Love" peaking at number 48. The album peaked at number 38 on the Kent Music Report.

In May 2014, the album was reissued on Compact Disc and music download by Sandman Records. and music download

== Background and Release ==
Throughout the mid-1970s, Morris has lived and recorded in the United States of America. He returned to Australia in early 1978 and formed a touring band and hit the Australian pub circuit. He later said that he felt his artistic merit was compromised in America and upon his return to Australia, mused "It was like diving under water for five years and then finally coming back for air". The Australian pub circuit was in full swing in 1978 and the Russell Morris Band played frequently alongside bands such as Mondo Rock, Skyhooks, Jim Keays Band, Jo Jo Zep and newly formed Cold Chisel and Rose Tattoo. The band was signed by Michael Gudinski to Mushroom Records and recorded the track " Thunder Ground"/"Two Minute Warning" which was released in March 1979 and peaked at number 49 on the Kent Music Report. Two additional singles were released, alongside the album in 1979. The band supported the album with a national tour and supported Santana, Eddie Money, Hall and Oats, Bob Marley and Dr. Hook on their Australian tours.

== Track listing ==
1979 Vinyl/ Cassette

Side one
No.	Title	Writer(s)	Length
1.	"Hot Love"	Russell Morris	3:40
2.	"Doctor In The House"	Russell Morris	3:54
3.	"Kidnapped"	Russell Morris	3:42
4.	"The Sky Is Falling"	Russell Morris	5:32

Side two
No.	Title	Writer(s)	Length
1.	"Your Place or Mine"	Russell Morris	3:40
2.	"I'm Just a Writer"	Russell Morris	3:31
3.	"Next Exit"	Russell Morris	3:58
4.	"Surprise, Surprise"	Russell Morris	3:56
5.	"Love Stealer"	Russell Morris	3:56

2014 Reissue

1. "Hot Love" - 3:40
2. "Doctor In The House" - 3:54
3. "Kidnapped" - 3:42
4. "The Sky Is Falling" - 5:32
5. "Your Place Or Mine" - 3:40
6. "I'm Just a Writer" - 3:31
7. "Next Exit" - 3:58
8. "Surprise, Surprise" - 3:56
9. "Love Stealer" - 3:56
10. "Thunder Ground" (Bonus Non LP tracks) - 4:30
11. "Two Minute Warning" (Bonus Non LP tracks) - 3:36

== Charts ==
Chart (1979)	Peak position
Australia (Kent Music Report)	38

== Release history ==
Region	Date	Format	Edition(s)	Label	Catalogue
Australia	1979	Vinyl; Cassette	Standard	Mushroom Records	L 37074
Australia	1997	CD	Reissue	Mushroom Records	MUSH32311.2
Australia	23 May 2014	CD; digital download	Reissue	Sandman Records	SAND449

== Credits ==
- Bass – Graham Thompson
- Drums – Keith Elliott
- Engineer – Ian McKenzie
- Keyboards – James Black
- Lead Guitar – Joey Amenta
- Guitar - Russell Morris
- Photography By – David Parker
- Saxophone – Bruce Sandell
- Vocals – Russell Morris, James Black, Joey Amenta, Mike Emerson
