= Step Lively =

Step Lively may refer to:

- Step lively (phrase), a phrase historically used by New York streetcar and subway conductors and pushers
- Step Lively (1917 film), a comedy short starring Harold Lloyd
- Step Lively (1944 film), a musical starring Frank Sinatra
- Step Lively (album), a 1981 album by Jo Jo Zep & The Falcons

== See also ==
- Step Lively, Jeeves!, a 1937 American comedy film
