= Lee So-young =

Lee So-young may refer to:

- Lee So-young (artist) (born 1973), South Korean comic artist
- Lee So-young (lawyer) (born 1985), South Korean lawyer and politician
- Lee So-young (volleyball) (born 1994), South Korean volleyball player
- Esom (born Lee So-young, 1990), South Korean actress and model
- Soyoung Lee, American art curator

== See also ==
- Lee (Korean surname)
- So-young, Korean given name
