= Jane Clifton =

Gibraltar-born Australian actress, singer, writer and voice artist

- Born: 10 April 1949 (age 77); Gibraltar
- Occupations: Actress; singer; writer; voice-artist; public speaker
- Years active: 1970–present
- Known for: Margo Gaffney (Prisoner); Singer with Jo Jo Zep and the Falcons
- Musical career
- Genres: Pop, rock
- Instrument: Vocals
- Labels: Mushroom Records, Sound Vault Records, ABC Records
- Formerly of: Scumbag, Toad, Double Decker Brothers, Stiletto, Jo Jo Zep and the Falcons
- Website: www.janeclifton.com.au

Jane Clifton (born 10 April 1949) is a British Gibraltar-born Australian actress, singer, writer and former radio and voice artist.

She is best known for her role in TV serial Prisoner as tough prison bookie Margo Gaffney.

As a singer, she has had stints with numerous bands including Scumbag, Toad, Stiletto, Double Decker Brothers and Jo Jo Zep and has recorded an album featuring Jenny Morris and Wendy Matthews, Mark Williams and Marc Hunter

== Early life ==
Clifton was born in Gibraltar to British Army parents. She lived most of her childhood in Germany and Malaysia. When her father left the army, the family emigrated from Cardiff, Wales to Perth, Australia, in 1961, before settling in Melbourne in 1965. She studied a Bachelor of Arts at Monash University, graduating in 1972. She became a naturalised citizen of Australia in 1992.

== Career ==
=== Radio and voiceover ===
Clifton started out her career on Melbourne community radio stations 3CR and 3RMT-FM in the 1970s. She then worked for commercial stations 3AK, Radio National and 774 ABC. Clifton has also done voice-over work for commercials and audio books.

=== Film, television and stage ===
Clifton has acted extensively in film and the stage and in various television programs. Beginning in cult favorites Stork (1971) and Pure Shit (1975), her films include The Clinic and A Slice of Life. Her stage roles include The Pack of Women and Mum's the Word. She has also made a number of television appearances, starting in the mid 70s with the Crawford's series Division 4, Homicide and Bluey, Against the Wind, Skyways, Holiday Island, Sweet and Sour, Carson's Law and Shock Jock, but her best-known acting role is probably that of tough prison bookie Margo Gaffney in Prisoner. Clifton played the role for 107 episodes from 1980 until 1984 on an intermittent basis as the script allowed, having previously appeared in the minor role of Yvonne, from episode 9, and featured in the Prisoner in Concert special.

Clifton also performed with Betty Bobbitt and Colette Mann as part of a three-woman troupe, The Mini Busettes, in the 1980s in RSLs across Australia.

In September 2010, it was announced that Clifton would be joining the cast of Neighbours as Judge Willow. Her scenes aired in November of that year.

In 2015 she appeared in the television series The Doctor Blake Mysteries as Sister Josephine.

=== Music ===
Clifton is also a singer. In 1975 she was the lead singer in a pub rock band, Toads, alongside Martin Armiger on lead guitar and vocals, Andrew Bell on guitar, Eric Gradman on violin, Marney Sheehan on bass guitar and Eddie Van Roosendaal on drums and vocals. In the following year with Bell, Sheehan, van Roosendaal and Janie Conway on guitar and vocals, Clifton formed rock, pop group Stiletto. Conway and Sheehan were replaced by Chris Worrall on guitar and Celeste Howden on bass guitar, respectively. The group provided three tracks, "Nights in Parlour", "Cream" and "The Man", for a Various Artists' album, Debutantes (1977).

Stiletto issued a studio album, Licence to Rage on Oz Records/EMI in September 1978, which was produced by Peter Walker. It peaked at No. 93 on the Kent Music Report albums chart. The album provided two singles, "Bluebirds" (March) and "Goodbye, Johnny" (August). Later that year the band supported a performance by Elvis Costello before breaking up early in 1979. While a member of Stiletto, Clifton co-wrote "Goodbye, Johnny" with Bell and Conway. The singer formed Jane Clifton Sextet, which provided cover versions of Billie Holiday and Ella Fitzgerald songs. In late 1982 Clifton provided vocals for Jo Jo Zep's single, "Taxi Mary", which reached No. 11 on the singles chart. She also provided vocals on Zep's album, Cha (October 1982).

Clifton released a solo single, "Girl on the Wall" (February 1984), on Mushroom. It is her version of a song from The Pack of Women cabaret, stage show. Her backing band, the Go Go Boys, comprised Jo Jo Zep's associates from the Black Sorrows, Jeff Burstin on guitar, Wayne Burt on guitar, Wayne Duncan on bass guitar, Steve Williamson on saxophone and Gary Young on drums. According to Debbie Muir of The Canberra Times, "her vocals are smooth and soft" and the song is "good and catchy". It peaked at No. 13. She issued two more singles, "My Machines" (June 1984) and "Turn to Dust" (May 1985).

Clifton provided vocals for tracks on the soundtrack album for TV series, Dancing Daze (February 1986), including "Second Home", which was released as the B-side of the single, "Might Have Been" by Jenny Morris, Wendy Matthews and Mark Williams. That album was produced by former bandmate, Armiger. For her track she was backed by the Green Sisters Band: Armiger and Bell both on guitars, Chris Abrahams on piano, Jeremy Alsop on bass guitar, Tony Buchanan on alto saxophone, Ricky Fataar on drums, Clive Harrison on bass guitar, Jason Morphett on tenor saxophone, Glen Muirhead on keyboards and Lloyd Swanton on bass guitar.

=== Author ===
Clifton is the author of the novels Half Past Dead (2002), A Hand in the Bush (2005) and Flush (2013). In 2011, she published her memoir The Address Book and in 2019 she wrote a book of poetry A Day at a Time – in Rhyme.

== Discography ==
=== Studio albums ===
Title	Album details
The Marriage of Style	Released: 2003; Format: CD; Label: Sound Vault Records

=== Soundtracks ===
Title	Album details
Dancing Daze (by Jenny Morris, Wendy Matthews, Mark Williams, Marc Hunter & Jane Clifton)	Released: February 1986; Formats: LP, Cassette; Label: ABC Music (RML 53191)

=== Singles ===
List of singles, with selected chart positions
Year	Title	Peak chart positions	Album
Year	Title	AUS	Album
1982	"Taxi Mary" (Jo Jo Zep featuring Jane Clifton (who is uncredited on the song))	11	Cha
1984	"Girl on the Wall"	13	
1984	"My Machines"	–	
1985	"Turn to Dust"	–	non album single

== Awards and nominations ==
=== Countdown Australian Music Awards ===
Countdown was an Australian pop music TV series on national broadcaster ABC-TV from 1974 to 1987, it presented music awards from 1979 to 1987, initially in conjunction with magazine TV Week. The TV Week / Countdown Awards were a combination of popular-voted and peer-voted awards.

Year	Nominee / work	Award	Result
1984	herself – "Girl on a Wall"	Best Female Performance in a Video	Nominated

== Filmography ==
=== Film ===
Year	Title	Role	Type
1971	Stork	Student (uncredited)	Feature film
1975	Pure S (aka 'Pure Shit')	Party Girl	Feature film
1982	A Slice of Life	Fay	Feature film
1982	The Clinic	Sharon	Feature film
1984	Anna Who?	Herself	Film short
1988	As Time Goes By	Mechanic	Feature film
1990	A Kink in the Picasso	Bella	Feature film
1992	Garbo	Mayor	Feature film
2010	Matching Jack	Finn's Doctor	Feature film
2014	Helen Garner's Monkey Grip	Herself	Film short
2017	Beast	Bea	Film short
2017	Lost Gully Road	Mother	Feature film

=== Television ===
Year	Title	Role	Type
1971; 1973	Division 4	Anne Mason / Hippy Girl	TV series, 2 episodes
1973	Ryan	Jenny	TV series, 1 episode: "A Little Something Special"
1975–76	Homicide	Cheryl / Jenny Walker / Janice Thelgood	TV series, 3 episodes
1977	Bluey	Seaboots	TV series, 1 episode: "Father and Son"
1978	Against the Wind	Convict Woman	TV miniseries, 2 episodes
1978; 1982; 1984	Countdown	Performer / Co-host	TV series, 3 episodes
1978	Rockturnal	Performer (with band 'Stiletto' sings "Nuclear War")	TV series, 1 episode
1979	Skyways	Shelley	TV series, 1 episode: "The Flying Sleuths"
1979–1984	Prisoner	Margo Gaffney / Yvonne	TV series, 107 episodes
1980	Working Up	Herself	Film documentary
1981	Holiday Island	Fran	TV series, episode: 'A Mother's Revenge'
1981	Prisoner in Concert	Herself	TV special
1981	Home	Kearns	TV series, 2 episodes
1982–1988	Hey Hey It's Saturday	Singer	TV series, 9 episodes
1983	For Love or Money	Herself	Film documentary
1984	Sweet and Sour		TV series, 1 episode
1984	Carson's Law	Mrs. Watkins	TV series, 1 episode
1984; 1985	The Mike Walsh Show	Performer	TV series, 2 episodes
1984	Special Squad	Karen	TV series, episode 31: "Brothers"
1986	Dancing Daze	Lee Harper	TV miniseries
1985	A Single Life	Lee	TV movie
1987–1988	Five Times Dizzy	Mrs. Wilson	TV series, 12 episodes
1989	The Power, The Passion	Carla Graham	TV series, regular role
1990	The Flying Doctors	Greta	TV series, 1 episode: "The Last Carnival"
1991	Col'n Carpenter	Emily Sutcliffe	TV series, 1 episode
1993–2005	Good Morning Australia	Regular singer	TV series
1995	Janus	Phillipa Strong	TV series, 1 episode: "A Lawful Apprehension"
1998	In Melbourne Tonight	Singer	TV series, 1 episode
2001	Round the Twist	Producer	TV series, 1 episode: "TV or Not TV"
2001	Shock Jock	Joy Gold	TV series, 1 episode: "Cops and Dobber"
2010; 2019	Neighbours	Judge Nerida Willow / Meg Fletcher	TV series, 5 episodes
2014	Winners & Losers	Lynette Vanderthorpe	TV series, 1 episode: "The New Me"
2015	The Doctor Blake Mysteries	Sister Josephine	TV series, 1 episode: "This Time and this Place"
2016	Bringing Our Stories Home	Miss Mulholland	TV series, 1 episode: "Doing Our Bit"
2017	Classic Countdown	Narrator	TV series, 1 episode: "1978"
2024	Fisk	Jean	TV series, 1 episode
2024	Countdown 50 Years On	Herself	TV special
2026	Steal	Shop Cashier	TV series 1 episode (1.2) 'Face Value"

== Stage ==
=== As performer ===
Year	Title	Role	Notes
1969	Saturday		La Mama, Melbourne with APG
1972	Our Dick		La Mama, Melbourne with The Tribe
1973	Gone to See a Man About a Dog		La Mama, Melbourne
1974	Nightflowers		La Mama, Melbourne
1974	Dimboola	Shirl	Chevron
1974	Women's Weekly 1 and Women's Weekly 2		Pram Factory, Melbourne with APG
1974	Out of the Frying Pan		Pram Factory, Melbourne with APG
1974	The Floating World		Pram Factory, Melbourne, Space Theatre, Adelaide with APG
1974	Africa		
1976	Sisters	Ziggy	Pram Factory, Melbourne with APG
1976	AC/DC	Melody	Pram Factory, Melbourne with APG
1979	Mickey's Moomba		Panel Beaters Space, Melbourne with APG
1979	L'Amante Anglaise / La Musica	Marguerite Duras	Pram Factory, Melbourne with APG
1980	Bent Brass	Hokum Jeebs / Compere	The Last Laugh, Melbourne, Space Theatre, Adelaide
1981	The Mini-Busettes		With Colette Mann & Betty Bobbitt
1983	The Pack of Women		Seymour Centre, Sydney, Universal Theatre, Melbourne, Space Theatre, Adelaide, Australian National University, Canberra, Nimrod Theatre, Sydney with Hocking & Woods
1984	On a Clear Day You Can See Jane Clifton	One woman show	The Last Laugh, Melbourne
1986	Take Two		The Last Laugh, Melbourne
1986	The Secret Diary of Adrian Mole, Aged 13¾		Melbourne Athenaeum with Hocking & Woods and Edgley International
1990	Dreamtime		Melbourne Concert Hall with State Theatre Opera
1990	Prisoner / Cell Block ‘H’play		UK tour
1990	Laughing Wild		Universal Two, Melbourne with Soup Kitchen Theatre
1991	On Our Selection	Alice Pettigrew	Playhouse, Melbourne with MTC
1993	An Evening with Merv Hughes		Sydney
1994; 1997	Love Letters	Melissa Gardner	Castlemaine Festival, Capers Theatre Restaurant
1996	I Only Want to be With You – The Dusty Springfield Story		Space Theatre, Adelaide
1998; 2002	Mum's the Word		Melbourne Athenaeum, Glen Street Theatre, Sydney for MICF
2001	Go in Tight	Barry Dickins	La Mama, Melbourne
2004	Stand-Up and Swing		With Denise Scott
2005	Menopause The Musical	The Soap Star	Comedy Theatre, Melbourne, Her Majesty's Theatre, Melbourne
2006	Barmaids	Nancy	Sutherland Entertainment Centre, Lennox Theatre, Parramatta with HIT Productions
2010	Spontaneous Broadway		Fairfax Studio, Melbourne for MICF
2011	Any Place I Hang My Hat Is Home	One woman cabaret show	Banquet Room, Adelaide with Adelaide Festival Centre for Adelaide Cabaret Festival
2012	Barassi	Narrator	Melbourne Athenaeum
2012	More Sex Please… We're Seniors		Comedy Theatre, Melbourne
2016; 2013	Boy Out of the Country	Margaret	Larrikin Ensemble
2016	Southern Belles	Singer	Banquet Room, Adelaide with Adelaide Festival Centre for Adelaide Cabaret Festival
2017	Spencer	Marilyn	Chapel Off Chapel, Melbourne with Lab Kelpie
2017	Jack of Two Trades		MAPA
2018	Rock Venus: The Songs of Linda Ronstadt	Singer	Dunstan Playhouse, Adelaide with Adelaide Festival Centre for Adelaide Cabaret Festival
2021; 2022	Mrs Prime Minister	Singer / Actor	Chapel Off Chapel, Melbourne, Memo Music Hall, Melbourne
2022	Sex and Death_ and the Internet		University of Adelaide for Adelaide Festival
2024	A Day at a Time in Rhyme	One woman show	La Mama, Melbourne, Australian regional tour, The Stratford Courthouse, UK

=== As director ===
Year	Title	Role	Notes
1973	Mechanics in a Relaxed Manner	Director	Pram Factory, Melbourne with APG
1976	How Grey was My Nurse	Director	Pram Factory, Melbourne with APG
1976	A Toast to Melba	Stage Manager / Sound Operator	National Theatre, Melbourne with APG
1984	On a Clear Day You Can See Jane Clifton	Creator	The Last Laugh, Melbourne
1986	Take Two	Writer / Director	The Last Laugh, Melbourne
2011	Any Place I Hang My Hat Is Home	Writer / Director	Banquet Room, Adelaide with Adelaide Festival Centre for Adelaide Cabaret Festival
2018	Rock Venus: The Songs of Linda Ronstadt	Writer / Director	Dunstan Playhouse, Adelaide with Adelaide Festival Centre for Adelaide Cabaret Festival
2024	A Day at a Time in Rhyme	Creator	La Mama, Melbourne, Australian regional tour, The Stratford Courthouse, UK
