= Almost Frantic =

Studio album by Russell Morris and the Rubes
- Released: February 1981
- Recorded: Armstrong Studios, Melbourne; Australia (1979-1980)
- Genre: Pop rock, Aussie Rock
- Label: Mushroom Records
- Producer: David Briggs, Eddie Rayner, Mark Moffatt, Ricky Fataar

Russell Morris and the Rubes chronology
Foot in the Door (1979)	Almost Frantic (1981)	A Thousand Suns (1991)

Alternative cover
- 2014 Compact Disc cover

"Almost Frantic" is the fifth studio album by Australian singer songwriter Russell Morris. It was credited to Russell Morris and the Rubes. The album was released in February 1981 and peaked at number 28 on the Kent Music Report. Three singles were released from the album throughout 1980/82, with the track "Hush" peaking at number 14.

In May 2014, the album was reissued on Compact Disc and music download by Sandman Records. and music download

== Background and Release ==
1979 had been busy for Russell Morris, with the release and promotion of the album Foot in the Door, concluding on 4 November on the steps of the Sydney Opera House in front of 100,000 people. In April 1980 Morris lost Joey Amenta and James Black from his band, but they were replaced with Max Chazan and Bruce Haymes. Chazan, Haymes and Rick Puchela has previously played in a band called "The Rubes", so 'The Russell Morris Band' became 'Russell Morris and the Rubes'. The band released a cover of the Billy Joe Royal song "Hush" in September 1980, which peaked at number 14 on the Kent Music Report. Morris had previously recorded the song with Somebody's Image in 1967, when it reached number 15. The album was promoted with the advertising tag "The album about to explode!" but peaked at number 28 on the Kent Music Report in early 1981. "The Roar of the Wild Torpedoes" and "So Tough" were released in 1981 but failed to chart.

Following the release of the album, Russell Morris and the Rubes released "Get it Right" in 1982, before the band parted ways in 1983.

== Reception ==
Reviewed at the time of release, Roadrunner said, "A lot of people are doubtless buying this album for the naff version of "Hush" it contains, but rest assured it's the lowpoint of the record. That marvellous, airy Morris voice, as capable as ever of delivering warmth and chill simultaneously, is placed up front in the mix."

== Track listing ==
1981 Vinyl/ Cassette

Side one
No.	Title	Writer(s)	Length
1.	"So Tough"	Russell Morris	3:20
2.	"Radio Active"	Russell Morris	3:18
3.	"Walk Don't Run"	Russell Morris	2:54
4.	"The Roar Of The Torpedoes"	Russell Morris	3:12
5.	"Don't Want To Talk About It"	Russell Morris	3:26

Side two
No.	Title	Writer(s)	Length
1.	"Somebody's Watching The House"	Russell Morris	3:13
2.	"I Don't Like The Night"	Russell Morris	2:12
3.	"In The Heat Of The Night"	Russell Morris	3:42
4.	"Don't Look Over Your Shoulder"	Russell Morris	2:20
5.	"Hush"	Joe South	3:00

2014 Reissue

1. "So Tough" - 3:20
2. "Radio Active" - 3:18
3. "Walk Don't Run" - 2:54
4. "The Roar Of The Torpedoes" - 3:12
5. "Don't Want To Talk About It" - 3:26
6. "Somebody's Watching The House" - 3:13
7. "I Don't Like The Night" - 2:12
8. "In The Heat Of The Night" - 3:42
9. "Don't Look Over Your Shoulder" - 2:20
10. "Hush" - 3:00
11. "Just Another One" (Bonus Non-LP track) - 2:58
12. "Get It Right" (Bonus Non-LP track) - 3:55
13. "You Wanted Fame" (Bonus Non-LP track) - 2:55
14. "I'll Stay With You" (Bonus Non-LP track) - 3:53
15. "Turn To Stone" (Bonus Non-LP track) - 3:09

== Charts ==
Chart (1981)	Peak position
Australia (Kent Music Report)	28

== Release history ==
Region	Date	Format	Edition(s)	Label	Catalogue
Australia	February 1981	Vinyl; Cassette	Standard	Mushroom Records	L -37488
Australia	23 May 2014	CD; digital download	Reissue	Sandman Records	SAND448

== Credits ==
- The Rubes – Bruce Haymes, Graham Thompson, Max Chazan, Rick Puchala
- Backing Vocals – Max Parker
- Engineer – Ross Cockle (tracks: 1 to 11), Tim Kramer (tracks: 12, 13)
- Saxophone – Wilbur Wilde
