= Lindsay Bourke =

Australian musician, painter, poet

- Also known as: Lindsay Blue, Lindsay Blue Bourke
- Born: 1945 (age 79–80)
- Origin: Sydney, New South Wales, Australia
- Genres: Classical; ambient
- Occupations: Musician; visual artist; poet
- Instruments: Keyboards; piano; organ
- Years active: 1966–2009
- Labels: Spore/AAVR Custom

Lindsay Bourke (born 1945), who also performed as Lindsay Blue, is an Australian classical and ambient musician, visual artist and poet. He issued two albums in the 1970s, Wilderness Awakening (1971) and Love All Life (1975). In the late 1990s he released, Millenium Symphony. In 1966, as a visual artist, he had his debut solo exhibition at a gallery and subsequently delivered Sydney's first sound and light mixed media show at the Cell Block Theatre.

== Biography ==
Lindsay Bourke was born in 1945. He was classically trained with early influences from Beethoven, Chopin and Mahler, while his later influence was Bob Dylan. Bourke had his debut solo painting exhibition at a small gallery in North Sydney in 1966. Soon after he provided Sydney's first sound and light mixed media show at the Cell Block Theatre. In 1969 he was the support act for progressive rock group, Tully and jazz musician, John Sangster. In July of the following year he performed a Beethoven-inspired concert, which F. R. Blanks of The Australian Jewish Times described, "the music was formally shapeless, in idiom a wild mixture, in technique visually striking and unpredictable." Also in that year he visited Germany and stayed with experimental musician, Karlheinz Stockhausen.

Bourke provided the soundtrack for a short silent film, The Beginning, by film-maker Chris Löfvén in 1971. Australian musicologist, Ian McFarlane, felt the "heavy organ score gave the film a chilling ambience, which only enhanced the more bizarre aspects..." Bourke's debut album, Wilderness Awakening (1971) was preceded by a concert at Sydney Town Hall, "Homage to Beethoven". Adrian Rawlins of Revolution caught Bourke's second performance of "Homage to Beethoven" in September 1970, at Melbourne Town Hall as part of his Peace Offering concert. Rawlins noticed the concert was, "not just sound and image but a fluid, fluent interrelated 'happening'..." McFarlane described Wilderness Awakening as "basically a piano improvisation in five movements." In August 1971 Bourke, and local rock band Pirana, supported Pink Floyd on the Australian leg of their Atom Heart Mother World Tour.

The artist appeared at the Aquarius Festival of Alternative Lifestyles in May 1973 at Nimbin. By 1975 Bourke, performing as Lindsay Blue, issued his second album, Love All Life. For the album he provided carillon, timpani, wind instruments, organ, marimba, grand piano, drums, percussion, synthesiser and gong. McFarlane declared it would be "classified as ambient or New Age relaxation music, with its emphasis on electronic instrumentation and natural sounds." Furthermore, some tracks displayed, "a distinct religious leaning." In the late 1990s Millenium Symphony was released by Lindsay Blue Bourke via his website.

== Discography ==
- Wilderness Awakening (1971) – (Spore/AAVR Custom) (CJ-70022)
- Love All Life (by Lindsay Blue (1975) (Custom) LB.01
- Millenium Symphony' (by Lindsay Blue Bourke) (c. 1999)
