= Tully (band) =

Australian progressive rock group

- Origin: Sydney, Australia
- Genres: Progressive rock; psychedelic rock; acid rock
- Years active: 1968–1972, 1976–1978
- Label: EMI
- Past members: John Blake; Michael Carlos; Richard Lockwood; Robert Taylor; Terry Wilson; Graham Conlan; Murray Wilkins; Ken Firth; Colin Campbell; Shayna (Karlin) Stewart; Andrew "Frizby" Thursby-Pelham; John "Bass" Walton; Bill Tahana
- Website: www.tullymusic.com

Tully were an Australian progressive rock group, which formed in late 1968. They were credited for the soundtrack album, Hair - An American Tribal (Australian Cast Recording) (1969), which peaked at No. 3 on the Australian albums chart. Their self-titled studio album, Tully (1970), reached No. 9. In 1972 the group disbanded before reforming briefly in 1976 and breaking up again in 1978.

== History ==
=== 1968–1969: Formation ===
Tully were formed in Sydney in September 1968 with the original lineup of John Blake on bass guitar, Michael Carlos on keyboards, Richard Lockwood on saxophone, flute, clarinet and piano and Robert Taylor on drums. They built up a following on the local "underground scene" and later on Melbourne's concert circuit. Tully's members were accomplished multi-instrumentalists with years of experience and their musical breadth quickly earned them a reputation as an adventurous and polished concert band.

The members were veterans of the Sydney club scene. NZ-born Blake had previously played in Johnny O'Keefe's backing band the Dee Jays (1959), as well as the Chessmen (1961), the Jimmy Sloggett Five (1963–64) and Max Merritt & the Meteors (1965). Blake and Carlos had both been members of mid-1960s club band Little Sammy and the In People (1966–67). Taylor was a child prodigy, who won best drummer in Western Australia three years in a row from the age of 11. Blake, Carlos, Lockwood and Taylor were members of Levi Smith's Clefs in early 1968, which was led by R&B singer Barrie McAskill.

Tully's progressive rock music combined various influences: pop, rhythm & blues, soul, modern jazz, classical music, folk/world music, psychedelic rock and acid rock. Tully played mostly original compositions, with improvisation a key performance feature. Tully were closely associated with Sydney underground media collective UBU. Their debut concert, on 4 January 1969, was also the final UBU-sponsored Underground Dance at Paddington Town Hall. They were supported by the Id – such dances were subsequently banned from the venue due to noise complaints and the "casual attire" of patrons.

Shortly after Tully's debut, they recruited singer, guitarist and flautist Terry Wilson. They took up a residency at Caesar's Disco in Sydney, but left after a month as patrons could not dance to their music. Tully played at two UBU Underground Dances at Sydney Showground in February 1969, which were described in that month's UBU News' article, "Life Is the Blood of Tully". They were reviewed by David Elfick in teen pop newspaper, Go-Set on 19 February. He was initially unimpressed, indicating a preference for the heavier style of fellow progressive rockers, Tamam Shud. Elfick wrote a positive feature article in the 12 March issue and became a supporter of the group.

Over the next twelve months, Tully's profile built steadily to become one of Australia's foremost rock concert attractions. In February 1969 began a residency at the Adams Apple disco, Oxford St, Sydney. During 11–12 April, Tully and East Sydney Technical College's Art Students Pop Orchestra supplied music for "Alexander Nevsky's Homecoming", which was a happening devised by David Humphries for the National Art Students' Union, with experimental theatre troupe The Human Body performing and lighting by UBU.

=== 1969-1972: Fusions to Loving is Hard ===
During June–July 1969 Tully were filmed for Fusions (August–September), a series of six half-hour shows on ABC-TV. It was created by former ABC current affairs producer Bill Munro. Fusions used lighting designed by UBU's Aggy Read for two episodes. The Australian Women's Weekly's Nan Musgrove observed, "for everyone who likes good music, but as good as the music is, it is not good TV... Pop-music combos, hairy or not, are not good visual subjects. They are splendid radio, bad TV." Guests included singer Wendy Saddington.

Australian-based entrepreneur Harry M. Miller selected Tully as the house band for the original Australian production of American theatrical rock musical, Hair. It premiered on 5 June 1969 at The Metro Theatre, Kings Cross. Tully line-up of Blake, Carlos, Lockwood, Taylor and Wilson were augmented by Mick Barnes on guitar, Keith Stirling on trumpet, Fred Payne on trumpet and John Sangster on percussion. Tully vocalist Terry Wilson joined the cast of the show and sang the featured number "Aquarius". Tully stayed with the production until early 1970 (when they were replaced by Luke's Walnut). They were recorded on the soundtrack album, Hair - An American Tribal (Australian Cast Recording) (late 1969) via Spin Records – it was produced by Miller and credited to Tully featuring +4. The soundtrack peaked at No. 3 on the Kent Music Report albums chart and was certified a gold record.

Tully and Sangster were supported by classical, ambient musician Lindsay Bourke during 1969. Tully headlined a concert at Sydney Town Hall, supported by John Sangster Quintet and by the Executives. Late in 1969 Blake was replaced on bass guitar by Graeme Conlan (ex-the Second Thoughts, White Wine), who was replaced in turn by Murray Wilkins, until Ken Firth was recruited in 1970. Tully were chosen by Roger Foley-Fogg (p.k.a. Ellis D Fogg) as regular band at Fogg's Lightshow Concerts in The Elizabethan Theatre, Newtown. Albie Thoms founder of friendly rival lightshow group, UBU said: "Fogg is later recognised as Sydney's leading lightshow artist" According to Rennie Ellis:

A concert at the Elizabethan Theatre was a sell out and hundreds of exotically dressed aficionados milled in the streets trying to get in. At this concert the group's rendition of 'A Whiter Shade of Pale' accompanied by Ellis D. Fogg lighting effects and the slow motion movements of a male and female dancer dimly visible through a screen behind them, was a superbly restrained happening of great beauty and sensitivity.

— Ellis, Rennie, "The Poets of Pop", Walkabout (1 June 1970), p. 3.

In January 1970 Tully appeared at Australia's first outdoor rock festival, the Pilgrimage for Pop, at Ourimbah, Central Coast, NSW over the Australia Day long weekend. On 14 February the group performed with the Sydney Symphony Orchestra (SSO) at the final 1970 Sydney Proms concert. This included the world premiere of Peter Sculthorpe's work Love 200, for orchestra and rock band, with words by Tony Morphett. It was performed by the SSO, augmented by Tully and singer Jeannie Lewis, conducted by John Hopkins, with light show by Fogg. A studio performance was recorded by the ABC. Wilson also worked as a member of Jeannie Lewis' Gyspy Train during 1970.

Tully signed with the Australian division of EMI and their self-titled debut album, Tully, was released on the EMI's Columbia label in July 1970. It peaked at No. 6 on the Go-Set Top 20 Albums chart, and No. 9 on the Kent Music Report albums chart. After Carlos purchased a Moog synthesiser, Tully became the first Australian band to use one during live performances.

In late 1970 Lockwood and Firth contributed to the debut LP Hush by Sydney band Extradition. Taylor and Wilson both left Tully in December 1970. According to rock historian Noel McGrath, this was because Carlos, Firth and Lockwood were adherents of Meher Baba mysticism. Extradition members Colin Campbell on guitar and Shayna (Karlin) Stewart on vocals joined Tully in early 1971. Taylor was not replaced and the group continued without a drummer. Campbell subsequently wrote or co-wrote considerable material for the group.

In 1971 Tully shifted to EMI's new progressive label Harvest, and released their only single, "Krishna Came" / "Lord Baba" (May 1971). This was followed in June by their second LP Sea of Joy, which was also the soundtrack to the surf film of the same name by Paul Witzig. Before it was issued Carlos quit the band to rejoin Levi Smith's Clefs. Tully continued without him for several months before finally splitting in early 1972. Tully had recorded enough material for EMI to curate a third album, Loving Is Hard (May 1972).

In October 1971 Taylor and Wilson formed a short-lived band, Space, which explored similar musical territory to Roy Wood's Electric Light Orchestra, mixing rock and classical instrumentation. The lineup included guitarist Dave Kain (ex-Dr Kandy's Third Eye), jazz pianist Bobby Gebert, bassist Ian Rilen (later of Blackfeather, Rose Tattoo and X) and cellist Adrian Falk. Lockwood had occasionally played with Tamam Shud and joined them full-time when Tully split.

=== 1976–1978: Reformation ===
In 1976 Robert Taylor formed a new group with guitarist Andrew "Frizby" Thursby-Pelham (ex-Berlin (fl. Perth, 1975)), and bass guitarist John "Bass" Walton (ex - Graphic). Taylor named them Tully, which performed mainly original rock-fusion tracks written by Thursby-Pelham, but also covered Mahavishnu Orchestra and Jeff Beck material. Bill Tahana provided vocals during 1977.

This version of Tully gained popularity in Western Australia, performing at Perth's Daly's Court, The Sandgroper and the City Hotel. From 1976 to 1978 Tully appeared at the annual Parkerville Amphitheatre weekend festivals. In 1977 the secretary of the Musicians Union, Harry Bluck, had the band headline a televised rally for youth unemployment at the Perth Supreme Court Gardens. Bluck encouraged the members to start a self-help group to deal with social problems prevalent in the contemporary music community. In 1978 John Walton became chronically ill and was unable to continue with the band. A suitable replacement was not found and Tully disbanded.

=== 1978-present: After Tully ===
John Blake was a member of the Original Battersea Heroes and in 1985 he rejoined Levi Smith's Clefs. Michael Carlos rejoined Levi Smiths Clefs in 1972, before moving into session work and arranging, contributing to albums by Jon English, Jeannie Lewis and Ross Ryan (to which Shayna Stewart and Ken Firth also contributed). In 1972 he was appointed musical director for the Australian theatrical production of Jesus Christ Superstar. He was the leader of the Baxter Funt Orchestra alongside Reg Livermore. Carlos arranged and conducted music for Livermore's one-man shows. In the late 1970s Carlos helped develop the Fairlight CMI –, the world's first commercially produced digital synthesiser.

Ken Firth worked in several bands with Barrie McAskill in 1972, including McAskill, Murphy, Maloney & Firth, and another version of Levi Smith's Clefs. He was a member of the Stevie Wright Band (1972–74), The Ferrets (1974–78), the Richard Clapton Band (1975), Billy Miller's Great Blokes, Buster Brown (1976) and Divinyls (1982).

Richard Lockwood joined a later lineup of Tamam Shud (1971–1972) and then followed Lindsay Bjerre into his next band Albatross (1972–1973). Lockwood died in September 2012 after being diagnosed with cancer several years earlier. Prior to his death, Lockwood oversaw preparations for the reissue of Tully's original recordings on CD.

Terry Wilson moved on to Space (1971), Lepers Abandon, Original Battersea Heroes (a.k.a. Heroes) (1973), Slack Band, Leroy's Layabouts (1975), Doyle Wilson Band (1975), Wasted Daze (1976–79) and the Magnetics (1983). Shayna Stewart joined the cast of Jesus Christ Superstar (1972) and performed on the related original Australian cast soundtrack LP. Stewart also contributed to Jon English's debut album, Wine Dark Sea (1973).

== Members ==
- John Blake – bass (1968-1969)
- Michael Carlos – keyboards, bass, percussion (1968–1971)
- Richard Lockwood – flute, saxophone, clarinet, piano, vocals (1968-1972)
- Robert Taylor – drums (1968-1970)
- Terry Wilson – vocals, guitar, flute (1968-1970)
- Graham Conlan – bass (1969)
- Murray Wilkins – bass (1969)
- Ken Firth – bass, guitar, percussion, vocals (1970-1972)
- Colin Campbell – guitar, vocals (1971-1972)
- Shayna (Karlin) Stewart – vocals (1971-72)
- Andrew "Frizby" Thursby-Pelham – guitar (1976-78)
- John "Bass" Walton – bass (1976-1978)
- Bill Tahana – vocals (1977)

== Discography ==
=== Albums ===
List of albums, with Australian chart positions
Title	Album details	Peak chart positions
Title	Album details	AUS
Hair - An American Tribal (Australian Cast Recording) (by Tully featuring +4)	Released: Late 1969; Label: Spin/Festival Records (SEL-933544)	3
Tully	Released: July 1970; Label: Columbia (SCXO 7926)	9
Sea of Joy	Released: 1972; Label: Harvest (SHVL 605); Soundtrack to the film Sea of Joy	-
Loving is Hard	Released: 1972; Label: Harvest (SHVL 607)	-
Live At Sydney Town Hall 1969-70	Released: 2009; Label: Chapter Music (CH76)	-
