= Wind in the Willows (1988 film) =

1988 Australian TV film

- Title screenshot
- Based on: The Wind in the Willows by Kenneth Grahame
- Written by: Leonard Lee
- Directed by: Geoff Collins
- Starring: Graham Matters; Terry Gill (uncredited); John Derum; Wallas Eaton; Carol Adams; Paul Johnstone
- Music by: Mark Isaacs
- Countries of origin: Australia; United Kingdom
- Original language: English

Production
- Producer: Roz Phillips
- Editors: Peter Jennings; Caroline Neave
- Running time: 49 minutes

Original release
- Release: 13 December 1988

Wind in the Willows is a 1988 Australian made-for-television animated film created by Burbank Films Australia. The film is based on Kenneth Grahame's 1908 English children's novel of the same name.

== Plot ==
While cleaning his underground home, Mole senses that spring is probably beginning above the ground. He is curious and decides that every mole should see the world at least once in his or her lifetime, so he makes himself a tunnel and soon finds himself in the English countryside. Mole marvels at this new world and wishes to see every bit of it. Along comes Rat, who befriends Mole and offers him a ride on his small blue rowboat as well as a short picnic by the riverbank. Rat tells Mole about the different creatures who live near the river. There's Badger, who is very grumpy, and Toad, who is very wealthy and lives in a fine mansion along the riverbank named "Toad Hall". When the two friends set out to meet Toad, Rat is bewildered to see that Toad has been swept away by a new mania: a love for gypsy carts. Toad offers Rat and Mole a ride in the caravan. The ride is thrilling and new for Mole, not so much for Rat, but it ends abruptly when the caravan is wrecked by a passing motorcar. Toad doesn't mind, because he is instantly taken by a new mania for motorcars. Rat and Mole fear that their friend's new mania is dangerous, for Toad can hardly drive in a competent and responsible manner.

Mole seeks out the advice of Badger, who lives deep inside the Wild Wood, where he's been told never to go since it is a very unsafe place, especially in winter. Rat follows Mole to Badger's house and the two animals ask for his help. Badger agrees to help out as soon as winter is over, for he and Rat are hibernating animals. Spring eventually comes and Badger orders that Toad be kept indoors and away from disastrous driving of motorcars. Toad escapes confinement and sets out to find a motorcar; or rather, steal one. Toad's crime lands him in prison, and his friends worry about his mysterious disappearance. With the help of a young girl named Emma, the gaoler's daughter, Toad manages to escape his cell dressed up as a washer-woman and returns to Toad Hall, first on a cab ride on a train with the train driver who then throws him out realizing that he is a Toad than a woman, then hitchhikes on a motorcar and eventually meets up with Rat at the river. He is shocked by the news that his home has been overtaken by a band of ruthless weasels. He and his friends, Rat, Mole, Badger and Otter, cook up a plan to recover Toad's prized home and restore order to the entire community along the riverbank. After taking the secret underground passage to Toad Hall, and throwing the weasels out of the mansion, Toad and his friends gather round the table to announce that he no longer has a mania for motorcars. However, it is at this moment that he begins to gain an interest in airplanes, as one flies around behind him through the window ending the film.

== Voice cast ==
- Graham Matters – Mole
- Terry Gill – Rat, Mr. Clark, Weasels, Car Man (uncredited)
- John Derum – Toad, Judge, Rabbit
- Wallas Eaton – Badger, Train Conductor
- Carol Adams – Emma (the jailer's daughter), Car Woman
- Paul Johnstone – Otter, Weasels, Jailer, Car Driver

== See also ==
- Adaptations of The Wind in the Willows
