= Redhouse (band) =

Australian rock band

- Origin: Australia
- Genres: Pop rock
- Years active: 1975–1978
- Labels: EMI Music
- Past members: Graham Matters, Garry Quince, Gary Crothall, Jack Green, Jacques De Jongh, John Dallimore, Robin Riley

Redhouse were a short-lived Australian rock band formed in 1975.

== Biography ==
Redhouse included members of the former Red House Roll Band, which had begun in Geelong in the early 1970s and released a single, "Oh Lucky Man!", from the 1973 film of the same name.

Redhouse originally featured Jack Green (bass), John Dallimore (guitar), Jacques De Jongh (guitar) and Gary Crothall (drums). In July 1976, De Jongh left the band to join Hush. He was replaced by Graham Matters (vocals) and Garry Quince (guitar and keyboards).

Redhouse released one album, One More Squeeze. Two singles were lifted from the LP: "I Like Dancing" (October 1976) and "Who's Foolin’ Who?" (February 1977).

In March 1977, Quince left to join Finch, and was replaced by Rob Riley. A third single, "Thank You", was released in August. Matters and Riley left the band later that year.

In December 1977, Green took over as manager, and the band re-formed with Dallimore, Crothall, Crothall's brother Rick on bass, and Joey Amenta on guitar. Amenta left a few months later to join the Russell Morris Band. Redhouse continued with the three members for a short time before disbanding.

Rock historian Ian McFarlane called them "a hard-working heavy rock group" but said their album "failed to reflect the band's on-stage energy, presenting instead a lightweight guitar-pop sound." Mike Parker in his Sydney Morning Herald album review says they are a "heavy rock outfit" and that "It would be mischievous to suggest that One More Squeeze contains anything remarkable. and yet there is a quality and immediate likability about it that makes it a pleasing experience. Not bad first time out." Julie Meldrum from the Canberra Times wrote "Redhouse thrives on bopper appeal" and that on their album "Graham Matters's vocals are handled well but without emotion and the instruments are similarly treated by the group's other members." In the Age Helen Thomas says the band "plays it hard and crunchy" who's sound is "rocky, melodic and sexy."

== Discography ==
=== Albums ===
List of studio albums, with selected details and chart positions
Title	Details	Peak chart positions
Title	Details	AUS
One More Squeeze	Released: 1976; Formats: LP; Label: EMI (EMC 2558)	89

=== Singles ===
List of singles, with selected chart positions
Year	Title	Peak chart positions	Album
Year	Title	AUS	Album
1976	"I Like Dancing" / "Hot Feet"	40	One More Squeeze
1977	"Who's Foolin' Who" / "I'm Just"	—	One More Squeeze
1977	"Thank You" / "Snapshot"	—	Non-album single
