= Oz (1976 film) =

- 2004 Collector's edition DVD cover
- Directed by: Chris Löfvén
- Written by: Chris Löfvén
- Based on: The Wonderful Wizard of Oz by L. Frank Baum
- Produced by: Lyne Helms; Chris Löfvén
- Starring: Joy Dunstan; Graham Matters; Bruce Spence; Gary Waddell; Robin Ramsay
- Cinematography: Dan Burstall
- Edited by: Les Luxford
- Music by: Wayne Burt; Baden Hutchins; Ross Wilson; Gary Young
- Distributed by: Greater Union
- Release date: 29 July 1976 (Australia)
- Running time: 103 min (Australia); 90 min (US version)
- Country: Australia
- Language: English
- Budget: A$150,000
- Box office: >$1 million (US/Canada)

Oz (a.k.a. Oz – A Rock 'n' Roll Road Movie also released as 20th Century Oz in United States) is a 1976 Australian film written, directed and co-produced by Chris Löfvén. It stars Joy Dunstan, Graham Matters, Bruce Spence, Gary Waddell, and Robin Ramsay; and received four nominations at the 1977 AFI Awards. The musical score is by Ross Wilson (frontman for Daddy Cool and Mondo Rock). The plot is a re-imagining of the 1939 The Wizard of Oz film transferred to 1970s Australia and aimed at an older teen / young adult audience. It was released on DVD in 2004 as Oz - A Rock 'n' Roll Road Movie : Collector's Edition with additional material. The poster and album sleeve for the American release was done by rock artist Jim Evans.

== Plot summary ==
Dorothy (Joy Dunstan) is a sixteen-year-old groupie riding with a rock band, Wally (Graham Matters) and the Falcons. Suddenly, the van is in a road accident, and she hits her head. She wakes up in a fantasy world as gritty and realistic as the one she came from and learns she killed a young thug in the process. A gay clothier, Glin the Good Fairy (Robin Ramsay), gives her a pair of red shoes as a reward to help her see the last concert of the Wizard (Matters), an androgynous glam rock singer. She is pursued by the thug's brother (Ned Kelly) who attempts to kidnap and rape her on several occasions. She also meets a dumb surfer named Blondie (Bruce Spence), a heartless mechanic named Greaseball (Michael Carman), and a timid biker named Killer (Garry Waddell).

== Cast ==
- Joy Dunstan as Dorothy, a groupie
- Graham Matters as The Wizard, a glam rock singer, Matters also plays Wally of Wally and the Falcons, a record salesman, a tram conductor, a doorman, and a face at the party
- Bruce Spence as Blondie, a surfie, Spence also plays the bass player of Wally and the Falcons
- Michael Carman as Greaseball, a mechanic, Carman also plays the drummer of Wally and the Falcons
- Gary Waddell as Killer, a bikie with The Lions, Waddell also plays the guitarist of Wally and the Falcons
- Robin Ramsay as Glyn the "Good Fairy", who runs a dress shop
- Ned Kelly as Truckie, who stalks Dorothy to avenge his deceased brother, Kelly also plays a bouncer

== Production ==
Chris Löfvén and Lyne Helms got the idea to make an Australian version of The Wizard of Oz while working in London in the early 1970s. Löfvén was also inspired by David Bowie and wanted Graham Matters to feature.

They moved back to Australia in September 1974, and house sat at the house of David and Kristen Williamson for six months writing the script (Kristen Williamson is Löfvén's sister). The first draft was rejected for funding but the second got some development from the Australian Film Development Corporation in March 1975, shortly before it became the Australian Film Commission.

The budget was $150,000 with $260,000 in contra deals. The Australian Film Commission invested $90,000 plus a loan of $25,000 and Greater Union put in $25,000 with the rest from private investment. The money took six months to raise.

Joy Dunstan was a singer and theatre actress who was cast after Löfvén saw her singing at the Flying Trapeze cafe. It was her first movie.

The film was shot in early 1976 over a five-week period near Melbourne.

== Release ==
The film was a commercial disappointment on release in Australia despite receiving some excellent reviews. It may have been hurt by the fact the soundtrack album was not ready before the film came out in July. However the movie was released in the US and was one of the highest-grossing Australian films there, grossing over $1 million before its release in the largest markets in New York and Los Angeles, and has become a cult movie.

== Soundtrack ==
Wilson, Gary Young and Wayne Burt were all former members of Daddy Cool. Their biggest hit single "Eagle Rock" had a promo video directed by Löfvén in 1971. By late 1975, Daddy Cool had disbanded and Wilson was waiting out his contract with Wizard Records by producing a Company Caine album for his own label Oz Records. Wilson signed Jo Jo Zep & The Falcons with members Young and Burt to his label. Once he became contractually free, Wilson recorded his first solo single "Livin' in the Land of Oz" and produced Jo Jo Zep & The Falcons' second single "Beating Around the Bush" both released mid-1976 from this soundtrack. The soundtrack also included two versions by Graham Matters of The Missing Links' "You're Driving Me Insane", written by the band's drummer Baden Hutchins and released on their self-titled 1965 album. The inclusion of this song, by a largely forgotten and long-disbanded Australian group, was a nod to Australia's 'sixties punk' heritage. Early the following year The Saints would release their cover of another Missing Links song, 'Wild About You'.

=== Track listing ===
Track listing for Australian version Oz - A Rock 'n' Roll Road Movie released on EMI in 1976; US version 20th Century Oz released on Celestial Records in 1977.

1. "Livin' in the Land of Oz" (Ross Wilson) — Ross Wilson - 4:12
2. "The Mood" (Wilson) — Ross Wilson - 3:31
3. "Beating Around the Bush" (Wayne Burt) — Jo Jo Zep & The Falcons - 3:30
4. "Our Warm Tender Love" (Gary Young) — Joy Dunstan - 3:46
5. "You're Driving Me Insane" (Baden Hutchins) — Graham Matters - 3:25
6. "Livin' in the Land of Oz" (Reprise #1) — Ross Wilson - 1:43
7. "Greaseball" (Wilson) — Ross Wilson - 3:43
8. "Glad I'm Living Here" (Burt) — Jo Jo Zep & The Falcons - 4:07
9. "Who's Gonna Love You Tonight" (Wilson, David Pepperell) — Ross Wilson - 4:41
10. "You're Driving Me Insane" (Reprise) — Graham Matters - 5:53
11. "Livin' in the Land of Oz" (Reprise #2) — Ross Wilson - 1:45
12. "Atmospherics" (Wilson, John French, Ian Mason) — Ross Wilson - 1:35

All songwriters according to Australasian Performing Right Association (APRA).

=== Charts ===
Chart (1976)	Position
Australia (Kent Music Report)	54

=== Personnel ===
- Ross Wilson – producer, arranger
- John French – engineer
- Peter Ledger — cover illustration & design
