= Chris Löfvén =

Australian filmmaker

Chris Löfvén (born 4 April 1948) is an Australian film maker and musician. He started making films when he was about 12. From 1969 to 1970, he was the bass player in the Melbourne soul and psychedelic pop band, Cam-Pact.

He is best known for directing the feature film Oz (1976) and for directing numerous music video clips, including for the Daddy Cool song, "Eagle Rock".

Löfvén became an announcer on Noosa community radio in the late 2000s, and has played in a number of local bands in the Noosa area.

== Select filmography ==
- The Tunnel (1963) short
- Part One - 806 (1969–71)
- Part Two - The Beginning (1971) - short (soundtrack/score by Lindsay Bourke)
- Cruisin' (1973–74) - short
- Oz - A Rock 'n' Roll Road Movie (1976) - feature
