= Shape I'm In (Jo Jo Zep & the Falcons song) =

Single by Jo Jo Zep & The Falcons

from the album Screaming Targets
- Released: October 1979
- Studio: Armstrong Studios, Melbourne
- Genre: Rock, Reggae-Pop
- Length: 3:32
- Label: Mushroom Records
- Songwriters: Joe Camilleri, Jeff Burstin, Tony Faehse
- Producer: Peter Solley

Jo Jo Zep & The Falcons singles chronology
"Hit and Run" (1979)	"Shape I'm In" (1979)	"All I Wanna Do" (1980)

"Shape I'm In" is a pop song written by Joe Camilleri, Jeff Burstin and Tony Faehse and recorded by Australian blues, rock and R&B band Jo Jo Zep & The Falcons. The song was released in October 1979 as the second single from the band's fourth studio album Screaming Targets (1979).

The song peaked at number 22 on the Kent Music Report in Australia.

== Track listing ==
7" (K 7665)

- Side A1 "Shape I'm In" - 3:32
- Side B1 "So Young" (new version) - 3:31
- Side B2 "Shape I'm In" (Dub Version) - 3:01

7" (UK) (WEA – K 79122)

- Side A1 "Shape I'm In" - 3:32
- Side B1 "Only The Lonely Heart"
- Side B1 "Nosey Parker"

== Charts ==
Chart (1979)	Peak position
Australian Kent Music Report	22
New Zealand (Recorded Music NZ)	41

== Cover versions ==
- Elekrik Force covered the song on the album, Craig Obey (2006)
- The Resignators covered the song on the album See You in Hell (2010)
