= (I'm in a) Dancing Mood =

Pop song by Delroy Wilson

"(I'm in a) Dancing Mood" is a pop song written and recorded by Delroy Wilson.

== Jo Jo Zep & The Falcons version ==
"(I'm in a) Dancing Mood"

Single by Jo Jo Zep & The Falcons

from the album Whip It Out
- Released: October 1977
- Studio: Armstrong Studios, Melbourne
- Genre: Pop
- Length: 3:35
- Label: Oz Records
- Songwriter: Delroy Wilson
- Producer: Ross Wilson

Jo Jo Zep & The Falcons singles chronology
"Security" (1976)	"(I'm in a) Dancing Mood" (1977)	"Honey Dripper" (1978)

"(I'm in a) Dancing Mood" was recorded by Australian blues, rock and R&B band Jo Jo Zep & The Falcons. The song was released in October 1977 as the lead single from their second studio album, Whip It Out (1977). The song peaked at number 90 on the Kent Music Report in Australia. It was recorded a few months prior by Australian reggae, R&B band Billy T, as a b-side.

== Track listing ==
7" (OZ-11555)

- Side A – "(I'm in a) Dancing Mood" - 3:35
- Side B – "I Remember" - 4:13

== Charts ==
Chart (1977)	Peak position
Australian Kent Music Report	90
