= Wayne Duncan =

Wayne Duncan may refer to:

- Wayne Duncan (Neighbours)
- Wayne Duncan (musician)
