= Out of Our Idiot =

Compilation album by Elvis Costello (credited to "Various Artists")
- Released: 4 December 1987
- Length: 70:47 (CD); 56:50 (LP)
- Label: Demon
- Producers: Nick Lowe; Elvis Costello; Colin Fairley; The Mono-Kings; The Coward Brothers; Clive Langer; Alan Winstanley; Allen Toussaint; T-Bone Burnett; Larry Hirsch

Elvis Costello chronology
Blood & Chocolate (1986)	Out of Our Idiot (1987)	Spike (1989)

Professional ratings
Review scores
Source	Rating
Allmusic	3.5/5 stars
Encyclopedia of Popular Music	3/5 stars
New Musical Express	8/10

Out of Our Idiot is a compilation album by English musician Elvis Costello. It was released only in the United Kingdom on 4 December 1987, through Demon Records. The album consists of B-sides, non-album tracks, and previously unreleased material recorded between 1979 and 1987. Rather than being credited to Elvis Costello, the album is instead credited to "Various Artists" due to Costello's use of pseudonyms on many of the tracks (including "Napoleon Dynamite", "The Emotional Toothpaste", and "The Costello Show"), as well as the numerous collaborations with other artists, including Jimmy Cliff, T Bone Burnett (as "The Coward Brothers"), and Nick Lowe.

Out of Our Idiot has received positive reviews for critics, with many praising its eclecticism and the quality of songwriting, though some have also noted it as being inconsistent. The album was certified Silver by the British Phonographic Industry in January 1988, denoting sales in excess of 60,000 copies.

== Songs ==
Out of Our Idiot consists of previously released tracks and alternate versions alongside two previously unreleased tracks. Opener "Seven Day Weekend" is a collaboration with Jimmy Cliff and was recorded for the film Club Paradise (1986). "Turning the Town Red" originates from the Goodbye Cruel World (1984) era and was written as the theme song to the short-lived TV series Scully. Costello has remarked that the final lyric "sounds like another of my many attempts to write a Chrissie Hynde song".

The one song that had never been released in any form prior to Out of Our Idiot was Costello and the Attractions' cover of "So Young". "Little Goody Two Shoes" is an early version of "Inch by Inch" from Goodbye Cruel World.

== Reception ==
Out of Our Idiot has received positive reviews from critics. Record Collector named it their "Album of the Month" for January 1988, describing the material as "alternately brilliant and bizarre, enlightening and annoying – prime Costello, in other words." While stating the album would "win few prizes for consistency or cover design", the publication praised the "prolific output which makes Elvis Costello a collector's dream also makes him one of the most fascinating rock artists of the last three decades." Roger Morton of Record Mirror awarded the album a four-out-of-five rating, calling it a "splendidly eccentric, eclectic album". Writing for NME, Jonathan Romney gave the album a rating of 8/10, praising what he found to be Costello's "Midas-like way of making everything he touches absolutely and unmistakably his own." While criticizing "The Stamping Ground" as "thin gruel" and describing "Baby It's You" as "soppy", Romney praised the cover of Yoko Ono's "Walking on Thin Ice" as well as "Black Sails in the Sunset", declaring the latter to be "one of [Costello's] finest [songs] ever".

Spin's Ira Robbins described the album as "eclectic" and an "essential collection of Costello's odds and sods", considering it a worthy successor to the artist's earlier B-side compilations Taking Liberties and Ten Bloody Marys & Ten How's Your Fathers (both 1980). Among the songs highlighted by Robbins are "Seven Day Weekend", which they called a "joyful juke jumper", as well as the cover of "So Young", the latter of which Robbins considered to be the album's "real treasure". David Hepworth of Q rated the album four stars out of five and similarly found Out of Our Idiot to be a worthy successor to Ten Bloody Marys & Ten How's Your Fathers, due to its ability to "underscore [Costello's] enormous zest and industry." While he criticized "Seven Day Weekend" as "ham-fisted", he praised "Get Yourself Another Fool" as proving Costello to be a "ballad singer of genius" and describing him an "enthusiast" for his rendition of Richard and Linda Thompson's "Withered and Died".

In a retrospective review for AllMusic, Stephen Thomas Erlewine gave the album three-and-a-half stars out of five. He praised the album for its "freewheeling, goofy humor" and stating he found the material to be "frequently excellent, whether it's covers (Yoko Ono's "Walking on Thin Ice", Smokey Robinson's "From Head to Toe", "So Young"), genre exercises, jokes, or full-fledged songs."

== Track listing ==
Out of Our Idiot track listing
No.	Title	Writer(s)	Performed by	Length
1.	"Seven Day Weekend" (from the film Club Paradise, 1986)	Elvis Costello; Jimmy Cliff	Jimmy Cliff, Elvis Costello & the Attractions	2:37
2.	"Turning the Town Red" (B-side to "I Wanna Be Loved", 1984)	Costello	Elvis Costello & the Attractions	3:20
3.	"Heathen Town" (B-side to "Everyday I Write the Book", 1983)	Costello	Elvis Costello & the Attractions	3:06
4.	"The People's Limousine" (single, 1985)	Henry Coward; Howard Coward	The Coward Brothers	3:37
5.	"So Young" (previously unissued)	Joe Camilleri; Jeff Burstin; Tony Faehse	Elvis Costello & the Attractions	3:26
6.	"Little Goody Two Shoes" (previously unissued)	Costello	Elvis Costello & the Attractions	2:27
7.	"American Without Tears No. 2" (B-side to "Blue Chair", 1987)	Declan MacManus	Elvis Costello	3:33
8.	"Get Yourself Another Fool" (B-side to "Don't Let Me Be Misunderstood" 12-inch, 1986)	Frank Haywood; Ernest Tucker	Elvis Costello & the Attractions	4:01
9.	"Walking on Thin Ice" (from Every Man Has a Woman, 1984)	Yoko Ono	Elvis Costello & the Attractions with the TKO Horns	3:42
10.	"Withered and Died" (B-side to "Peace In Our Time", 1984)	Richard Thompson	The Imposter	3:12
11.	"Blue Chair" (single, 1987)	MacManus	Elvis Costello	3:38
12.	"Baby It's You" (B-side to "The Only Flame in Town", 1984)	Burt Bacharach; Mack David; Barney Williams	Nick Lowe and Elvis Costello	3:15
13.	"From Head to Toe" (single, 1982)	Smokey Robinson	Elvis Costello & the Attractions	2:34
14.	"Shoes Without Heels" (from "Blue Chair" 12-inch, 1987)	MacManus	Elvis Costello & the Confederates	4:14
15.	"Baby's Got a Brand New Hairdo" (B-side to "Don't Let Me Be Misunderstood", 1986)	MacManus	The Costello Show featuring the Attractions	3:21
16.	"The Flirting Kind" (B-side to "Let Them All Talk", 1983)	Costello	Elvis Costello & the Attractions	2:58
17.	"Black Sails in the Sunset" (B-side to "Tokyo Storm Warning" 12-inch, 1986)	Costello	Elvis Costello & the Attractions	3:09
18.	"A Town Called Big Nothing (Really Big Nothing)" (12-inch single, 1987)	MacManus	The MacManus Gang (featuring the voice of Sy Richardson)	5:43
19.	"Big Sister" (B-side to "You Little Fool", 1982)	Costello	Elvis Costello & the Attractions	2:16
20.	"Imperial Bedroom" (B-side to "Man Out of Time" 12-inch, 1982)	Costello	Napoleon Dynamite & the Royal Guard	2:47
21.	"The Stamping Ground" (B-side to "You Little Fool", 1982)	Costello	The Emotional Toothpaste	3:09
Total length:				70:47

Notes:

- The LP edition of the album does not include "Little Goody Two Shoes", "Withered and Died", "A Town Called Big Nothing (Really Big Nothing)" and "Big Sister".
- With the exception of "Little Goody Two Shoes", all of the tracks on Out of Our Idiot were later released as bonus tracks on individual albums when Costello's pre-1987 catalogue was re-released on CD on the Rykodisc and Rhino labels. An alternate version of "Little Goody Two Shoes" was included on the Imperial Bedroom bonus disc.
- The mix of "Get Yourself Another Fool" which appears on the album is different than that of its original single release.

== Personnel ==
=== Production credits ===
- "Seven Day Weekend" – Nick Lowe with Colin Fairley
- "Turning the Town Red" – The Mono-Kings, Clive Langer and Alan Winstanley
- "Heathen Town", "The Flirting Kind" – Clive Langer and Alan Winstanley
- "The People's Limousine", "Blue Chair", "Baby's Got a Brand New Hairdo" – The Coward Brothers (Elvis Costello and T Bone Burnett)
- "So Young" – "produced at gunpoint" by Nick Lowe
- "Little Goody Two Shoes" – Geoff Emerick
- "American Without Tears No. 2 (Twilight Version)" – Colin Fairley
- "Get Yourself Another Fool" – Nick Lowe with Colin Fairley and Elvis Costello
- "Walking on Thin Ice" – Allen Toussaint
- "Withered and Died" – Colin Fairley and the Imposter (Costello)
- "Baby It's You" – Nick Lowe, Elvis Costello and Paul "Bassman" Riley
- "From Head to Toe", "Imperial Bedroom", "The Stamping Ground" – Elvis Costello
- "Shoes Without Heels" – T Bone Burnett and Larry Hirsch
- "Black Sails in the Sunset", "Big Sister" – Nick Lowe
- "A Town Called Big Nothing (Really Big Nothing)" – Declan McManus (Costello)
