= Graham Matters =

Australian actor and musician (1948–2021)

- Born: 19 July 1948; Fitzroy, Victoria, Australia
- Died: 7 May 2021 (aged 72); Victoria, Australia
- Occupation: Actor

Graham Matters (19 July 1948 – 7 May 2021) was an Australian actor and musician.

He appeared in the 1976 film Oz as Wally, the Wizard, record salesman and tram conductor. He was one of the original Australian cast members of The Rocky Horror Show in 1974. Matters was the lead singer of the band Redhouse.

== Filmography ==
=== Film ===
Year	Title	Role	Notes
1970	Part One: 806		Film
1976	Oz	Wally / The Wizard / Record Salesman / Tram Conductor / Doorman / Face at Party (voice)	Feature film
1988	The Black Arrow	Voice	Animated TV movie
1988	Hard Knuckle	Kevin	TV movie
1988	Wind in the Willows	Mole (voice)	Animated TV movie
1990	Dead Sleep	Patient	Feature film

=== Television ===
Year	Title	Role	Notes
1979	Skyways	Dave	2 episodes
1978–1980	Cop Shop	Ray Bartlett / Gary Dunn / Peter Saunders	6 episodes
1991	Dinky Di's	Various characters (voice)	
1997	The Adventures of Sam		2 episodes
2005–2007	The Adventures of Bottle Top Bill and His Best Friend Corky	Bottle Top Bill (voice)	4 episodes

== Theatre ==
Year	Title	Role	Notes
1969; 1972	Hair	Three Principals	Metro Theatre, Sydney, Metro Theatre, Melbourne
1974	The Rocky Horror Show	Rocky Horror	New Art Cinema, Sydney
1976	The Faraway Land of Magical Frank	Frank	Total Theatre, Melbourne
1977; 1978	Ned Kelly	Police / Townspeople / Pub Dancer / Blacktrackers	Festival Theatre, Adelaide, Her Majesty's Theatre, Sydney
1980; 1981	Boy’s Own McBeth	Mr. Elston	Paris Theatre, Sydney, Comedy Theatre, Melbourne, Canberra Theatre, Opera Theatre, Adelaide, Los Angeles
1985	The Rocky Horror Show		Civic Theatre, Burnie, Princess Theatre, Launceston, Entertainment Centre, Glenorchy, Canberra Theatre, Wagga Wagga Civic Theatre, Albury Civic Theatre, Wangaratta Town Hall, Shepparton Civic Centre, West Gippsland Arts Centre, Memorial Theatre, Ballarat
1991	Cho Cho San	Singer	Princess Theatre, Woolloongabba
