= Cha (album) =

Studio album by Jo Jo Zep
- Released: 22 October 1982
- Recorded: June 1982
- Studio: Richmond Recorders
- Genre: Rock, pop
- Label: Mushroom, A&M
- Producer: Peter Solley

Jo Jo Zep chronology
Step Lively (1981)	Cha (1982)	The Sound of Jo Jo Zep & The Falcons (1983)

Singles from Cha
- 1. "Taxi Mary" Released: September 1982; 2. "Walk On By" Released: December 1982; 3. "Losing Game (1983 release only) " Released: July 1983

Cha is the seventh studio album by Australian band Jo Jo Zep & The Falcons, but first and only to be credited as Jo Jo Zep. It is also the final studio album by the band until Ricochet in 2003. The album was released in October 1982 and peaked at number 28 on the Australian Kent Music Report. David Nichols called Cha primarily a "latin-based dance record".

In a 2014 interview with Carol Duncan, Camilleri reflected on the album saying "I had this really beautiful 13-piece band and we went around the country and we had two hit singles... but I wasn't very happy with the record. It could have been so much better and it was my fault that it wasn't as good as I wanted it to be, but anyway, it yielded these two songs and we got to play and I got to do something that I wanted to do which was play with the cha band and six horns and high-heeled boots and gay cavalier and all that nonsense, but it just left me wanting. It was nice, but it wasn't what I wanted to do."

Jo Jo Zep & The Falcons disbanded in 1983.

== Reception ==
Cha was reviewed in January 1983 (Volume 7) of the Countdown Magazine, in which they said the album sees Jo Jo Zep "breaking away from his R&B base and exploring reggae, jazz, techno-pop, Joe Jackson-type big ballads, Caribbean rhythms and more. The result is a heady potpourri, a frothy brew of style and substance." adding "The strong vocal contributions of Jane Clifton give this work a dimension"

== Track listing ==
Australian track listing

Side A (L 37886)
No.	Title	Writer(s)	Length
1.	"Walk On By"	Burt Bacharach, Hal David	3:51
2.	"Taxi Mary"	Jeff Burstin, Joe Camilleri, Tony Faehse	4:02
3.	"Sherrie"	Camilleri, Paul Kelly	3:50
4.	"Slave For Love"	Camilleri, Kelly	4:39
5.	"You're Gonna Get It Boy"	Burstin, Camilleri, Simon Gyllies	3:11

Side B
No.	Title	Writer(s)	Length
1.	"Lonely Man"	Arthur Harris	3:36
2.	"Man is Just a Boy"	Camilleri, Kelly, Gyllies	4:24
3.	"Spirit of the Land"	Martin Kellock	4:30
4.	"Can't Decide"	Camilleri, Kelly, Gyllies	3:55

International track listing [1983] (A&M Records)

The international version of Cha differs substantially from the Australian release. In addition to scrambling the track order, this version drops the tracks "You're Gonna Get It Boy" and "Lonely Man", and adds "Losing Game", "King Kong", "Flexible", and "Competition".

Side A (A&M Records)
No.	Title	Writer(s)	Length
1.	"Losing Game"	Joe Camilleri, Simon Gyllies, Stephen Clarke	4:12
2.	"Walk On By"	Burt Bacharach, Hal David	3:51
3.	"King Kong"	Camilleri	4:01
4.	"Taxi Mary"	Jeff Burstin, Camilleri, Tony Faehse	4:02
5.	"Flexible"	Camilleri	1:59

Side B
No.	Title	Writer(s)	Length
1.	"Sherrie"	Camilleri, Paul Kelly	3:50
2.	"Man is Just a Boy"	Camilleri, Kelly, Gyllies	4:24
3.	"Spirit of the Land"	Martin Kellock	4:30
4.	"Competition"	Camilleri, Lawrence	4:20
5.	"Slave For Love"	Camilleri, Kelly	4:39
6.	"Can't Decide"	Camilleri, Kelly, Gyllies	3:55

== Charts ==
Chart (1982)	Peak position
Australian Kent Music Report	28
New Zealand Albums (RMNZ)	33
