= I Will Return (song) =

Single by Jo Jo Zep & The Falcons

from the album Hats Off Step Lively
- Released: October 1980
- Studio: Armstrong Studios, Melbourne
- Genre: Rock
- Length: 3:17
- Label: Mushroom Records
- Songwriter(s): Joe Camilleri, Jeff Burstin, Tony Faehse
- Producer(s): Peter Solley

Jo Jo Zep & The Falcons singles chronology
"Puppet on a String" (1980)	"I Will Return" (1980)	"Sweet" (1981)

"I Will Return" is a pop song written by Joe Camilleri, Jeff Burstin and Tony Faehse and recorded by Australian blues, rock and R&B band Jo Jo Zep & The Falcons. The song was released in October 1980 as the third and final single from the band's fifth studio album Hats Off Step Lively (1980).

A limited edition of the single included a bonus 7" of two live tracks. The song peaked at number 91 on the Kent Music Report in Australia.

== Track listing ==
7" (K 8086)

- Side A "I Will Return" - 3:17
- Side B "I Will Return" (Live Version: Recorded at The Bottom Line, New York) - 3:27

7" (K 8086 - Limited Edition)

- Side A "I Will Return" - 3:17
- Side B "I Will Return" (Live Version) - 3:27
- Side C "Don't Wanna Come Down" (Live Version: Recorded at Montreaux Jazz Festival) - 3:27
- Side D "I Need Your Loving" (Live Version: Recorded at Montreaux Jazz Festival) - 8:40

== Charts ==
Chart (1980)	Peak position
Australian Kent Music Report	91
