= Dexterity (Jo Jo Zep & The Falcons album) =

Studio album by Jo Jo Zep & The Falcons
- Released: 3 July 1981
- Recorded: 1980−81
- Genre: Rock, pop
- Label: Mushroom
- Producer: Peter Solley

Jo Jo Zep & The Falcons chronology
Hats Off Step Lively (1980)	Dexterity (1981)	Step Lively (1981)

Singles from Dexterity
- 1. "Sweet" Released: February 1981

Dexterity is the sixth studio album by Australian blues/rock band Jo Jo Zep & The Falcons. The album was released in July 1981 and peaked at number 92 on the Australian Kent Music Report.

== Track listing ==
Side A
No.	Title	Writer(s)	Length
1.	"Sweet"	Joe Camilleri, Jeff Burstin, Tony Faehse	3:43
2.	"Tighten Up"	Camilleri, Burstin, Faehse	3:22
3.	"Flexible"	Camilleri	1:59
4.	"Fallen Heroes"	Camilleri, Burstin, Faehse	3:46

Side B
No.	Title	Writer(s)	Length
1.	"Nosey Parker"	J. Robinson, G. Agard,	3:17
2.	"Johnny Kain"	Camilleri, Burstin, Faehse	2:52
3.	"Fool Enough"	Burstin	3:33
4.	"Rub Up Push Up"		3:03
5.	"Please Please Please"	Camilleri	1:14

== Charts ==
Chart (1981)	Peak position
Australian Kent Music Report	92
