= Hats Off Step Lively =

Studio album by Jo Jo Zep & The Falcons
- Released: 15 August 1980
- Recorded: 1979−80
- Genre: Rock, pop, blues rock
- Label: Mushroom
- Producer: Peter Solley

Jo Jo Zep & The Falcons chronology
Screaming Targets (1979)	Hats Off Step Lively (1980)	Dexterity (1981)

Singles from Hats Off Step Lively
- 1. "All I Wanna Do" Released: April 1980; 2. "Puppet on a String" Released: July 1980; 3. "I Will Return" Released: October 1980

Hats Off Step Lively is the fifth studio album by Australian blues/rock band Jo Jo Zep & The Falcons. The album was released in August 1980 and peaked at number 17 on the Australian Kent Music Report, becoming the band's second top twenty album. The band toured the album across Australia throughout August and September 1980.

A substantially revised version of this album (dropping four tracks, and adding six others) was released internationally under the title Step Lively in September 1981, with new cover art.

== Track listing ==
Side A
No.	Title	Writer(s)	Length
1.	"Puppet on a String"	Joe Camilleri, Jeff Burstin, Tony Faehse	3:31
2.	"Rudie"	Camilleri, Burstin, Faehse	4:33
3.	"(Don't) Keep It Up"		3:46
4.	"P.T"	Camilleri, Burstin, Faehse	3:40
5.	"I Will Return"	Camilleri, Burstin, Faehse	3:19

Side B
No.	Title	Writer(s)	Length
1.	"All I Wanna Do"	Malcolm Lilley, Cook	3:02
2.	"Don't Go"		3:03
3.	"Too Hot to Touch"	Camilleri, Burstin, Faehse	2:33
4.	"No Mystery to Me"		2:48
5.	"Hand Me Down"		4:35

== Charts ==
Chart (1980)	Peak position
Australian Kent Music Report	17
