= So-young =

- Hangul: 소영
- RR: Soyeong
- MR: Soyŏng

So-young, also spelled So-yeong, is a Korean given name.

People with this name include:

== Actresses and musicians ==
- Ahn So-young (born 1959), South Korean actress
- Ko So-young (born 1972), South Korean actress
- Soyoung Yoon (born 1984), South Korean violinist
- Yoo So-young (born 1986), South Korean singer, former member of After School
- Fat Cat (singer) (born Kim So-young, 1990), South Korean singer
- Esom (born Lee So-young, 1990), South Korean actress and model

== Sportspeople ==
- Chung So-young (born 1967), South Korean badminton player
- Kim So-yeong (born 1992), South Korean badminton player
- Lee So-young (volleyball) (born 1994), South Korean volleyball player
- Park So-young (born 1994), South Korean badminton player

== Visual artists ==
- Soh Yeong Roh (born 1961), South Korean art museum director, daughter of former president Roh Tae-woo
- So Yong Kim (born 1968), South Korean-born American filmmaker
- Soi Park (born Park So-young, 1971), South Korean photographer
- Lee So-young (artist) (born 1973), South Korean manhwa artist

== Fictional people ==
- Kang So-young, a female supporting character and antagonist in the 2015 South Korean television series Who Are You: School 2015
- Park So-young, a female supporting character in the 2017 South Korean television series Suspicious Partner
- Kang So-young, a female supporting character in the 2016 South Korean television series Five Enough

== See also ==
- List of Korean given names
