= Ricochet (Jo Jo Zep & The Falcons album) =

Studio album by Jo Jo Zep
- Released: 22 September 2003
- Recorded: 2002–2003
- Studio: Woodstock Studios, Melbourne, Australia
- Genre: Rock; funk; soul; blues
- Length: 68:00
- Label: Head

Jo Jo Zep and the Falcons chronology
Shape I'm In: The Complete Anthology (1997)	Ricochet (2003)	The Best of Jo Jo Zep & The Falcons (2007)

Ricochet is the eighth and final studio album by Australian band Jo Jo Zep and the Falcons. It is the first studio album from the band in over 20 years. The album featured the "classic" line-up of the Falcons: Joe Camilleri on vocals and sax, Jeff Burstin on guitar, Tony Faeshe on guitar, Wilbur Wilde on sax, John Power on bass, and Gary Young on drums. Ricochet was released in September 2003. The album was supported with a national tour in early 2004.

== Reception ==
Hector from HMV said "Ricochet is bluesy, dirty R&B paying homage to Joe Camilleri's early influences. The man can write a hook in his sleep but this isn't about capturing the charts once more. This is about musicians being true to their craft and acting their age. That in mind, take Ricochet for the new music it is and Jo Jo Zep and the Falcons for what they are now." He also described the album as "low-key" and added, "There's nothing too hard to have to think about here. Simply enjoy."

== Track listing ==
1. "Devil's Got My Woman" – 5:06
2. "Sweet Jesus" – 4:03
3. "Here I Am" – 5:11
4. "Voodoo" – 4:58
5. "Come on Home" – 4:22
6. "God's Creatures" – 3:27
7. "Take You Back Again" – 4:40
8. "Why Wouldn't You Tell Me?" – 3:53
9. "Ain't Got No Money" – 3:02
10. "Warm and Tender Love" – 3:40
11. "Young Girl" – 3:04
12. "Ain't That Loving You Baby" – 2:52
13. "Wouldn't Know Where to Start" – 3:03
14. "Leave No Stone Unturned" – 2:44
15. "Yes Indeed" – 3:56
16. "Real Good Thing" – 3:19
17. "You Can't Catch Me" – 3:32
18. "Not a Woman, Not a Child" – 3:12
