= Hit and Run (Jo Jo Zep & the Falcons song) =

Single by Jo Jo Zep & The Falcons

from the album Screaming Targets
- Released: July 1979
- Studio: Armstrong Studios, Melbourne
- Genre: Rock, Reggae-Pop
- Length: 3:30
- Label: Mushroom Records
- Songwriter(s): Joe Camilleri, Jeff Burstin, Tony Faehse
- Producer(s): Peter Solley

Jo Jo Zep & The Falcons singles chronology
"So Young" (1978)	"Hit and Run" (1979)	"Shape I'm In" (1979)

"Hit and Run" is a pop song written by Joe Camilleri, Jeff Burstin and Tony Faehse and recorded by Australian blues, rock and R&B band Jo Jo Zep & The Falcons. The song was the first on the Mushroom Records label, released in July 1979 as the lead single from the band's fourth studio album Screaming Targets (1979).

The song peaked at number 12 on the Kent Music Report in Australia, becoming the band's first top 20 single. It was also the band's first single to be released in USA via Columbia Records.

== Track listing ==
7" (K 7525)

- Side A – "Hit and Run" - 3:30
- Side B – "Not A Woman, Not A Child" - 3:34

7" (USA)' (11319)

- Side A – "Hit and Run" - 3:19
- Side B1 "Nosey Parker" - 3:16
- Side B1 "Thin Line" - 3:22

== Charts ==
=== Weekly charts ===
Weekly chart performance for "Hit and Run"
Chart (1979)	Peak position
Australian Kent Music Report	12

=== Year-end charts ===
Year-end chart performance for "Hit and Run"
Chart (1979)	Position
Australia (Kent Music Report)	63
