= Taxi Mary =

Single by Jo Jo Zep

from the album Cha
- Released: September 1982
- Studio: Richmond Recorders, Melbourne
- Genre: Synthpop, electronic
- Length: 3:56
- Label: Mushroom Records
- Songwriter(s): Jeff Burstin, Joe Camilleri, Tony Faehse
- Producer(s): Peter Solley

Jo Jo Zep singles chronology
"Gimme Little Sign" (1981)	"Taxi Mary" (1982)	"Walk On By" (1982)

"Taxi Mary" is a pop song written by Jeff Burstin, Joe Camilleri and Tony Faehse and recorded by the Australian musicians Jo Jo Zep (pseudonym of Camilleri) and Jane Clifton (who is uncredited on the song). It was released in September 1982 as the lead single from Zep's seventh studio album, Cha (1982).

Camilleri later said that the song came at a time when "we weren't looking too good on the charts. I needed a hair transplant, I needed some work on my teeth, I needed platform shoes and to put my kids through University".

The song peaked at number 11 on the Kent Music Report in Australia.

== Track listing ==
7" (Mushroom – K-8818)

- Side A – "Taxi Mary" - 3:56
- Side B – "This Is Our Time" - 3:22

== Charts ==
Chart (1982)	Peak position
Australian Kent Music Report	11
