= Beating Around the Bush =

Single by Jo Jo Zep & The Falcons

from the album Don't Waste It
- Released: July 1976
- Studio: T.C.S. Studios
- Genre: Pop
- Length: 3:00
- Label: Oz Records
- Songwriter(s): Wayne Burt
- Producer(s): Ross Wilson

Jo Jo Zep & The Falcons singles chronology
"Run Rudolph Run" (1975)	"Beating Around the Bush" (1976)	"Security" (1976)

"Beating Around the Bush" is a pop song written by Wayne Burt and recorded by Australian blues, rock and R&B band Jo Jo Zep & The Falcons. The song was released in July 1976 as the second single from the soundtrack to the 1976 film Oz. It was later included on Jo Jo Zep & The Falcons' debut studio album, Don't Waste It (1977).

The song peaked at number 73 on the Kent Music Report in Australia.

== Track listing ==
7" (OZ 001)

- Side A – "Beating Around the Bush" - 3:00
- Side B – "Glad I'm Living Here" - 4:07

== Charts ==
Chart (1976)	Peak position
Australian Kent Music Report	73
