= Puppet on a String (Jo Jo Zep & the Falcons song) =

Single by Jo Jo Zep & the Falcons

from the album Hats Off Step Lively
- Released: July 1980
- Studio: Armstrong Studios, Melbourne
- Genre: Rock
- Length: 3:20
- Label: Mushroom Records
- Songwriter(s): Joe Camilleri, Jeff Burstin, Tony Faehse
- Producer(s): Peter Solley

Jo Jo Zep & the Falcons singles chronology
"All I Wanna Do" (1980)	"Puppet on a String" (1980)	"I Will Return" (1980)

"Puppet on a String" (sub-titled "Let Her Go") is a pop song written by Joe Camilleri, Jeff Burstin and Tony Faehse and recorded by Australian blues and rock band Jo Jo Zep & the Falcons. The song was released in July 1980 as the second single from the band's fifth studio album Hats Off Step Lively (1980).

The song peaked at number 53 on the Kent Music Report in Australia.

== Track listing ==
7" (K 7993)

- Side A "Puppet on a String" - 3:20
- Side B "Ain't Going to Spend Another Lonely Night Without You" - 3:16

== Charts ==
Chart (1980)	Peak position
Australian Kent Music Report	53
