= So Young (album) =

Studio album by Jo Jo Zep & The Falcons
- Released: 24 November 1978
- Recorded: 1978
- Genre: Rock, pop
- Label: Oz Records
- Producer: Joe Camilleri

Jo Jo Zep & The Falcons chronology
Live!! Loud and Clear (1978)	So Young (1978)	Let's Drip Awhile (1979)

Singles from So Young
- 1. "So Young" Released: September 1978

So Young is a mini-album by Australian blues, rock and R&B band Jo Jo Zep & The Falcons. Released in November 1978. The Album peaked at number 80 on the Australian Kent Music Report. "Soon You'll Be Gone" charted on the UK Indie Singles Charts at #35.

The group were angered by their record label EMI's decision to charge $5.99 for the record, rather than the $3.99 they had wished it to retail for. As a result, they left EMI and signed with Mushroom Records. The inclusion of a 'free album' in the first 5,000 copies of their next release, Screaming Targets, was to compensate fans who paid an album price for So Young.

== Track listing ==
Side A
No.	Title	Writer(s)	Length
1.	"So Young"	Joe Camilleri, Tony Faehse, Jeff Burstin	3:36
2.	"Soon You'll Be Gone"	The Blues Busters	3:00
3.	"Show Ya' Fun"	Camilleri	1:46
4.	"Long Distance Call"	McKinley Morganfield	3:05

Side B
No.	Title	Writer(s)	Length
1.	"I Believe to My Soul"	Ray Charles	4:59
2.	"Crazy Mixed Up World"	Little Walter	2:31
3.	"It's All Over Now"	Bobby Womack, Shirley Womack	3:53

== Personnel ==
- Joe Camilleri — vocals, saxophone
- Wilbur Wilde — saxophone
- Jeff Burstin — guitars
- Tony Faehse — guitars
- John Power — bass, vocals
- Gary Young — drums

== Charts ==
Chart (1978)	Peak position
Australian Kent Music Report	80
