= All I Wanna Do (Jo Jo Zep & the Falcons song) =

- UK Cover art

Single by Jo Jo Zep & The Falcons

from the album Hats Off Step Lively
- Released: April 1980
- Studio: Armstrong Studios, Melbourne
- Genre: Rock, pop
- Length: 3:04
- Label: Mushroom Records
- Songwriter(s): Malcolm Lilley / Cook
- Producer(s): Peter Solley

Jo Jo Zep & The Falcons singles chronology
"Shape I'm In" (1979)	"All I Wanna Do" (1980)	"Puppet on a String (Let Her Go)" (1980)

"All I Wanna Do" is a pop song written by Lilley/Cook and recorded by Australian blues, rock and R&B band Jo Jo Zep & The Falcons. The song was released in April 1980 as the lead single from the band's fifth studio album Hats Off Step Lively (1980).

The song peaked at number 34 on the Kent Music Report in Australia.

== Track listing ==
7" (K 7897)

- Side A "All I Wanna Do" - 3:04
- Side B "Too Hot To Touch" - 2:33

7" (UK) (WEA – K 79149)

- Side A "All I Wanna Do" - 3:04
- Side B "Thin Line"

== Charts ==
Chart (1980)	Peak position
Australian Kent Music Report	34
