= Whip It Out =

- 1983 re-release by AXIS Records

Studio album by Jo Jo Zep & The Falcons
- Released: 25 November 1977
- Recorded: 1977
- Genre: Pop rock
- Label: Oz Records
- Producer: Ross Wilson, Peter Walker

Jo Jo Zep & The Falcons chronology
Don't Waste It (1977)	Whip It Out (1977)	Live!! Loud and Clear (1978)

Singles from Whip It Out
- 1. "(I'm in a) Dancing Mood" Released: October 1977

Whip It Out is the second studio album by Australian band Jo Jo Zep & The Falcons. It was released on 25 November 1977, by Oz Records. The album peaked at number 98 on the Australian Kent Music Report.

== Track listing ==
Side A
No.	Title	Writer(s)	Length
1.	"Rough 'n' Ready"	Wayne Burt	2:42
2.	"The Girl Across The Street (Just Turned 18)"	Gary Young	3:20
3.	"Cry Cry Cry"	Wayne Burt	4:11
4.	"Love is a Fire"	Joe Camilleri	3:22
5.	"I'm a Madman"	Gary Young	2:55

Side B
No.	Title	Writer(s)	Length
1.	"Boogie in the Barnyard"	Louis Jordan, Wilhelmina Gray	2:33
2.	"Fix It Up"	Wayne Burt	4:02
3.	"I Remember"	Camilleri, Russell Kinross-Smith	4:13
4.	"(I'm in a) Dancing Mood"	Delroy Wilson	3:35
5.	"I Need Your Lovin'"	Bobby Robinson, Don Gardner	4:09

== Personnel ==
Jo Jo Zep & The Falcons

- Joe Camilleri — lead vocals, saxophone, backing vocals
- Wilbur Wilde — saxophone, backing vocals
- Jeff Burstin — guitars, backing vocals
- Tony Faehse — guitars, backing vocals
- John Power — bass, backing vocals; lead vocals on "I'm A Madman" and "Boogie in the Barnyard"
- Gary Young — drums, backing vocals

Additional personnel

- Chrissie Hammond — backing vocals
- Lindsay Hammond — backing vocals
- Wayne Burt — guitars, backing vocals, piano
- James Niven — piano, organ
- Peter Jones — piano
- Gary Hyde — vibes, marimbas, congas
- Ross Wilson — percussion, backing vocals

== Charts ==
Chart (1977)	Peak position
Australian Kent Music Report	98
