= Don't Waste It =

Studio album by Jo Jo Zep & The Falcons
- Released: 18 February 1977
- Recorded: 1976
- Genre: Southern rock
- Label: Oz Records
- Producer: Ross Wilson

Jo Jo Zep & The Falcons chronology
Don't Waste It (1977)	Whip It Out (1977)

Singles from Don't Waste It
- 1. "Beating Around the Bush" Released: July 1976; 2. "Security" Released: 8 November 1976

Don't Waste It is the debut studio album by Australian band Jo Jo Zep & The Falcons. Released in February 1977, the album peaked at number 37 on the Australian Kent Music Report.

Band member Joe Camilleri later reflected saying "The first Jo Jo Zep & The Falcons album was a heart-breaking experience. We had so much energy live, but I didn’t know how to capture that in the studio."

== Track listing ==
Side A
No.	Title	Writer(s)	Length
1.	"Security"	Otis Redding	2:55
2.	"Dancing Shoes"	Wayne Burt	5:03
3.	"If It's Love That You Want Darlin'"	Wayne Burt	4:19
4.	"King of Fools"	Wayne Burt	6:07
5.	"Someday It's Gonna Come to You"	Wayne Burt	3:18

Side B
No.	Title	Writer(s)	Length
6.	"We're All in the Same Boat"	Wayne Burt	3:45
7.	"Beating Around the Bush"	Wayne Burt	3:30
8.	"That's Alright"	James Lane	3:57
9.	"Sweet Little Latin Lover"	Wayne Burt	5:06
10.	"The Cthulhu"	Joe Camilleri, Bruce Woodcock	4:59

== Personnel ==
Jo Jo Zep & the Falcons

- Joe Camilleri — tenor and alto saxophones, vocals; lead vocals (tracks 1, 3–6, 10)
- Jeff Burstin — lead guitar
- Wayne Burt — rhythm guitar, vocals; lead vocals (tracks 2, 7, 9)
- John Power — bass, vocals; lead vocals (track 8)
- Gary Young — drums

Additional personnel

- Ross Wilson — percussion, backing vocals
- Adrian Paine — percussion
- Peter Jones — vibraphone
- Pat Wilson — backing vocals (track 9)

== Charts ==
Chart (1977)	Peak position
Australian Kent Music Report	37
