= Jo Jo Zep and the Falcons =

Australian blues and rock music band

- Jo Jo Zep and the Falcons performing at the Melbourne International Music and Blues Festival in February 2004; Left to right: Joe Camilleri, John Power and Wilbur Wilde

Background information
- Also known as: Jo Jo Zep and His Little Helpers, Jo Jo Zep
- Origin: Melbourne, Victoria, Australia
- Genres: Pop; blues; rock; R&B; soul; reggae
- Years active: 1975–1984; 2001–present
- Labels: Oz; EMI; Mushroom; Rockburgh; Columbia; Warner Records Australia
- Past members: see members list below

Jo Jo Zep and the Falcons are an Australian blues and rock band that features the singer, songwriter and saxophonist Joe Camilleri (aka "Jo Jo Zep"). The band was active in the late 1970s and early 1980s, and had several Australian chart hits including "Hit and Run", "Shape I'm In" and "All I Wanna Do". The Falcons dissolved in 1981 and the group's biggest Australian hit, 1982's "Taxi Mary", as well as the New Zealand top ten hit "Walk on By", were both credited simply to "Jo Jo Zep". In 1983, Camilleri and other members of the Falcons formed the Black Sorrows.

The late 1970s line up of Camilleri, Jeff Burstin on guitar, Tony Faehse on guitar, John Power on bass guitar, Wilbur Wilde on saxophone and Gary Young on drums, reunited in 2001, and again in 2003 to release a new album. In 2007, the group was inducted into the ARIA Hall of Fame. Further reunion concerts occurred in 2008 and 2011, and an Australian tour took place in 2013. According to Australian rock music historian Ian McFarlane, the group was initially a "funky, energetic R&B band" which "infused the music with large dose of reggae rhythms" and later was a "brass-driven, latin-styled big band".

== History ==
=== Formation (1975–1976) ===
In late 1975, Jo Jo Zep and the Falcons were formed in Melbourne as Jo Jo Zep and His Little Helpers. The band were put together after Ross Wilson (ex-Daddy Cool, Mighty Kong), who was waiting out his recording contract, had turned to producing other artists for the label, Oz Records. He decided to produce a version of Chuck Berry's "Run Rudolph Run" as a one-off Christmas single for Mushroom Records. Contractually, Wilson could not perform the vocals himself, so he asked his friend, Joe Camilleri (ex-the Pelaco Brothers with Stephen Cummings) to sing and play on the recording. Camilleri's nickname was "Jo Jo Zep", which was derived from a traditional Maltese nickname for "Joseph", so the group was named Jo Jo Zep and His Little Helpers. The line-up included bass guitarist John Power (ex-Foreday Riders).

To promote the single, Camilleri and Power formed a more permanent blues and rock music band. Power had relocated from Sydney to Melbourne to join Company Caine for an album which Wilson was producing. However Company Caine, which also included guitarist Jeff Burstin and drummer John McInerney, had soon separated. Wilson suggested that all three team up with Camilleri to perform "Run Rudolph Run" as part of a Christmas show at the Myer Music Bowl. This performance (still billed as "Jo Jo Zep and His Little Helpers") marked Camilleri's first appearance on Countdown – the Australian national TV pop music series. After the Christmas performances, they added a second guitarist and vocalist, Wayne Burt (ex-Rock Granite), and Daddy Cool's drummer Gary Young replaced McInerney. Now a five-piece outfit consisting of Camilleri, Burstin, Burt, Power and Young, the band renamed themselves Jo Jo Zep and the Falcons, with the Falcons part referencing Camilleri's Maltese background. Camilleri had wanted his former bandmate, Cummings, to join as lead vocalist, but Cummings declined and later formed the Sports.

I wasn't meant to be the lead singer of the band. My whole idea was to play the saxophone and I really wanted Stephen Cummings to be the singer, 'cause we were really great mates but for whatever reason he bowed out after just a couple of rehearsals. We had a full list of songs by Wayne Burt and that really made the difference for us. I wasn't writing any songs really and I thought Wayne was a much better singer than me as well but he didn't want to be the lead singer, so we sort of shared it around for a little while. – Joe Camilleri.

=== Oz Records (1977–1978) ===
Cover of Jo Jo Zep and the Falcons' debut album Don't Waste It (1977)

Jo Jo Zep and the Falcons signed with Oz Records and, in July 1976, released their first single, "Beating Around the Bush". The track was written and sung by Burt and peaked at No. 73 on the Australian Kent Music Report Singles Chart. The song was also one of two tracks by the group on Wilson's soundtrack for the feature film Oz (1976). The follow-up single was a cover of Otis Redding's "Security" sung by Camilleri, which peaked at No. 98. In February 1977, the band released their debut album, Don't Waste It, which was produced by Wilson and contained both singles. The album featured lead vocal turns by Camilleri, Burt and Power. The songwriting was mostly by Burt, with a few cover tunes, and one song by Camilleri. Although the intent was to be a serious R&B band, the musical direction was never set in stone.

We started off with no idea at all. We pretty much threw all the stuff in the pot and went on playing. It was a case of demand driving it. It took off like a rocket. We got more work than we could travel away, but the thing took on a life of its own. The thing with the Falcons, we never actually changed our style that much. We just accumulated new ones. It turned into a stratified thing 'cause we were mixing everything together all the way through. There was no plan. – John Power.

Cover for their mini-LP So Young (1978)

Burt left soon after the release of the debut album, and was replaced by guitarist Tony Faehse (ex-Musick Express, Alvin Stardust). Camilleri felt "[that] changed the band a lot. Tony wasn't an R&B/Blues player. He'd only been in Australia a year or so and had more of that big 'rock' sound, a fiery guitar player, and was a great foil for Jeff Burstin who was from a country blues background, so they complemented each other." Burt went on to join various groups including Eternal Struggle, Rock Doctors and Hey Gringo. In June 1977, saxophonist Wilbur Wilde (Ol' 55) joined to complete the 'classic line-up' of Camilleri, Burstin, Faehse, Power, Wilde and Young.

Wilson also produced the band's second album, Whip It Out, which was released in November 1977. The associated single, "(I'm in a) Dancing Mood", peaked at No. 90. Songwriting was at this point divided more-or-less equally amongst Burt (still contributing to the band as a songwriter), Camilleri, and Young, all working individually. To capture the energy and spontaneity of a live performance, the next Jo Jo Zep and the Falcons release was a five-track extended play, Live!! Loud and Clear, which reached No. 53 in August 1978. Its lead track "The Honeydripper" receiving most of the airplay. Fellow musician, Paul Kelly, recalled their early performances, "[t]hey did house-rocking, roof-raising versions of classic and obscure soul, R'n'B and reggae songs... They waved their guitars and saxophones in the air, did everything they could to get over to the crowd."

The EP So Young was released in November 1978 and reached No. 29. By this point, it had started to pick up a number of international supporters, including Graham Parker and The Rumour and Elvis Costello and The Attractions. Costello recorded a cover version of "So Young", which eventually appeared on Out of Our Idiot (1987).

=== Mushroom Records (1979–1984) ===
Cover of 1979 album, Screaming Targets

In 1979, Jo Jo Zep and the Falcons signed with Mushroom Records after Oz Records had folded. By now, the songwriting was being looked after by Burstin, Camilleri, and Faehse working together as a trio, and Camilleri was the group's lone front man. As well, the group had included another musical direction: reggae.

Meanwhile, Mushroom was eager to connect with the 'new wave' in England and brought over Peter Solley, an English producer and latter-day Procol Harum member, to produce another Mushroom artist, The Sports. One night Solley saw Jo Jo Zep and the Falcons perform, and on the strength of their new song, "Shape I'm In", asked to produce the group. The first single, "Hit and Run", from the album, Screaming Targets, was pop reggae and reached No. 12 on the charts in August 1979. Camilleri said he "never thought 'Hit and Run' would do anything but maybe the lick was infectious enough – though as a song it was a bit stupid – but it got us a deal all over the world. It was a wacky thing and all of a sudden we were away in a different arena".

The band toured the United States, the United Kingdom and the rest of Europe, including performances in The Bottom Line club in New York, and at the Montreux Jazz & Blues Festival. In July 1980, the band had been the opening act at the Oakland Coliseum, in San Francisco, supporting Journey, Black Sabbath and Cheap Trick. Camilleri told a hostile audience, which was throwing objects (including eggs) at the group, "Is it any wonder your parents lost the Vietnam War – you can't even shoot straight!" After the international experience, the band started to lose some of its impetus.

Back home, the singles continued with "Shape I'm In", "Puppet on a String", "I Will Return". In August 1980, the band issued the album Hats Off Step Lively in Australia. In July 1981, Dexterity was released. The band continued touring internationally, but tensions within the group were increasing and in June 1981, Camilleri pulled Jo Jo Zep and the Falcons off the road.

We could have done it if we'd kept punching, but the band actually disintegrated, basically, looking back, because we were too tired. We should have just taken a year off. But what happened was we were right at the end of the period when, in order to flog a record in the States, you were virtually out promoting the one you had out the year before. So it was a totally asynchronous situation. We were having to dig into what we viewed as archives when we went out of the country. So we were having to promote Screaming Targets when we already had Hats Off Step Lively out here. It was at a time of the most intense development of original material in the band's life so the result was extremely disruptive. – Camilleri

In September 1981, a revised version of Hats Off Step Lively was issued in North America, titled simply Step Lively. The album featured a selection of tracks from the Hats Off Step Lively and Dexterity albums, augmented by two newly recorded cover tunes ("Gimme Little Sign" and "But It's Alright") produced by H.W. Casey and Rick Finch of K.C. and the Sunshine Band. However, the group had fractured by this point (Young, Power and Wilde all dropped out) and was not available to promote the North American LP release. Step Lively ultimately flopped commercially despite some good reviews.

Young and Power joined Rock Doctors, and Wilde formed his own band, Big Kombi. Camilleri, Burstin and Faehse then gathered a new rhythm section featuring bassist Simon Gyllies (Mondo Rock), and drummer Freddie Strauks (Skyhooks) and started exploring Latin American rhythms, particularly salsa. However, The 'Falcons' moniker was dropped around the time Faehse dropped out, and beginning in 1982, the act was known simply as Jo Jo Zep. The new Jo Jo Zep line-up soon expanded....

Then I had a big hit with "Taxi Mary" but that was without this band, and "Walk On By", but it was too late really. I couldn't see myself playing in an 11 piece salsa band. It was only a minute in my life. I enjoyed the band and enjoyed the tour but I realised I didn't have my friends behind me anymore. I had to start again. Then I reunited with half the band at the start of what became The Black Sorrows. – Camilleri

The Jo Jo Zep album Cha, was released in October 1982; It was produced by Peter Solley The lead single, "Taxi Mary" (a duet between Camilleri and Jane Clifton) reached No. 11 on the Australian singles chart. Later, their moody, synth-driven cover version of "Walk on By" was a hit in Australia, and peaked at No. 6 in New Zealand in June 1983. Another Jo Jo Zep single, "Losing Game", was issued in 1983, and was produced by Split Enz member Eddie Rayner and Camilleri. "Losing Game" was released in the United States but was the last single by this version of the group, which by this point was essentially a solo project of Camilleri.

In March 1984, the Jo Jo Zep and the Falcons line-up of Burstin, Camilleri, Power, Wilde and Young reunited for an Australian tour to promoted the compilation album, The Sound of Jo Jo Zep & The Falcons which had been issued in December 1983. A final Jo Jo Zep single, "Shape I'm In – Live" was issued in February 1984; it had been recorded during Jo Jo Zep's support slot on Tim Finn's initial 1983 solo tour, and featured Tim Finn on backing vocals. The rest of the band for this live gig consisted of session players backing Camilleri, including Ricky Fataar on drums, Venetta Fields on backing vocal, and ex-Falcon Wilbur Wilde on sax.

Since 1983, Camilleri has led various musicians in The Black Sorrows, which has included Falcons' alumn Burstin, Burt and Young as official members, and Faehse and Wilde as session musicians on recordings. According to Australian rock music historian Ian McFarlane, Jo Jo and the Falcons were initially a "funky, energetic R&B band" which "infused the music with large dose of reggae rhythms" and later was a "brass-driven, latin-styled big band".

=== Reformation/reunions (2001–2019) ===
In 2003, Jo Jo Zep and The Falcons released a new studio album, Ricochet – it was instigated by Neil Mumme, organiser of the annual Great Southern Blues & Rockabilly Festival held annually in Narooma.

In '97 Joe came and blew the horn on the Johnnie Johnson tour, and because (bass player) John Power was also on tour (with his band The Hippos as the late Johnson's regular Australian backing band), I said to Joe "What about we get the Falcons back for a show?" and it was like the Joe Walsh line, "When Hell freezes over" but I chipped away at it for four years and they finally did it in 2001, the first show (Jo Jo Zep) had done in twenty years, and there was such a buzz out of that I said to them, "Why don't you make a record?" – Neil Mumme

The album was recorded at Camilleri's Woodstock Studios in Melbourne and released in September 2003. It was performed by the 'classic' 1977–1981 line-up: Camilleri on vocals and saxophone, Burstin on guitar, Faehse on guitar, Power on bass guitar, Wilde on saxophone, and Young on drums. Early Falcons' member Wayne Burt also contributed by writing two new compositions. After their appearance at Narooma they supported the album's release with a brief national tour into early 2004.

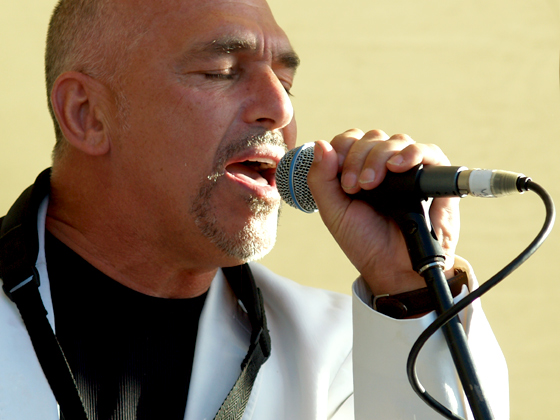
Camilleri as vocalist, Mordialloc Festival, March 2006.

They reunited again for a single gig in December 2008, with Camilleri, Burstin, Faehse, Wilde and Young being joined by Joe Creighton (of The Black Sorrows), who stepped in for Power on bass guitar. In September 2011, another reformation occurred, for a one-off performance to celebrate their 35th anniversary, with the 'classic' line-up of Camilleri, Burstin, Faehse, Power, Wilde and Young. This same line-up of the band undertook an Australian tour in 2013

Power died of heart failure in hospital in Wellington, New South Wales on 30 November 2018. A memorial concert was performed by Jo Jo Zep & The Falcons and The Rock Doctors in Power's honour in Melbourne on 17 March 2019, with all proceeds going to his daughter Julia. At the show, Camilleri made remarks alluding to that concert potentially being the last ever Jo Jo Zep & The Falcons concert. There have not been any performances by the band since, though no formal announcement of any permanent disbanding has been made.

=== Hall of Fame ===
On 18 July 2007, Australian Recording Industry Association (ARIA) inducted Jo Jo Zep and the Falcons into its Hall of Fame. Also inducted that year were Hoodoo Gurus, Marcia Hines, Frank Ifield, Radio Birdman and Brian Cadd. According to Camilleri, "I always thought that I was the weak link in the band, that I wasn't good enough to be in it. I had some great moments, moments that I didn't deserve, and was just happy to tag along". Prior to the induction, Camilleri said "I'm chuffed. I think the Falcons did play a part in the Australian music explosion ... I'm happy it's been acknowledged. The Falcons were a band out of time. What we played wasn't what was being played. It was an R&B/reggae sound in the time of flares and funk and pop music. Somehow we slotted in." At the induction ceremony, Mark Seymour declared that Jo Jo Zep and the Falcons were an inspiration for the formation of his band, Hunters & Collectors. For Young, it was his second induction in a row, his 2006 entry was as a member of Daddy Cool.

== Members ==
Arranged chronologically:

- Joe Camilleri – vocals, saxophone, guitar
- John Power (died 2018) – bass guitar, vocals, backing vocals (1975–1982, 1984, 2001, 2003–2004, 2011–2018)
- Jeff Burstin – guitar, backing vocals
- John McInerney – drums (1975)
- Peter Starkie – guitar (1975) (died 2020)
- Wayne Burt – vocals, guitar (1975–1977)
- Gary Young – drums, backing vocals (1975–1982, 1984, 2001, 2003–2004, 2008, 2011–present)
- Tony Faehse – guitar, backing vocals (1977–1982, 1984, 2001, 2003–2004, 2008, 2011–present)
- Wilbur Wilde – saxophone, backing vocals (1977–1984, 2001, 2003–2004, 2008, 2011–present)
- Sarah Buchanan – vocals, backing vocals, (1982–1983)
- Bill Canty – keyboards (1982–1983)
- Jane Clifton – vocals, backing vocals (1982–1983)
- Steve Ewart – trombone, keyboards (1982–1983)
- Simon Gyllies – bass guitar, backing vocals (1982–1983)
- Dezzy McKenna – drums (1982–1983)
- Sherine Abeyratne – vocals (1983)
- Martin Kellock – vocals (1983)
- Keith Pereira – percussion (1982–1983)
- Ray Pereira – congas, timbales (1982–1983)
- Freddie Strauks – drums (1981–1982)
- James Valentine – saxophone (1982–1983)
- Paul Williamson – saxophone (1982–1983)
- Joe Creighton – bass guitar (2008)

== Discography ==
- Don't Waste It (1977)
- Whip It Out (1977)
- So Young (1978)
- Jo Jo Zep and the Falcons (1979)
- Screaming Targets (1979)
- Hats Off Step Lively (1980)
- Dexterity (1981)
- Cha (as Jo Jo Zep) (1982)
- Ricochet (2003)
