= So Young (Jo Jo Zep & the Falcons song) =

Single by Jo Jo Zep & The Falcons

from the album So Young
- Released: September 1978
- Genre: Pop
- Length: 3:33
- Label: Oz Records
- Songwriters: Joe Camilleri, Jeff Burstin, Tony Faehse
- Producer: Joe Camilleri

Jo Jo Zep & The Falcons singles chronology
"Honey Dripper" (1978)	"So Young" (1978)	"Hit and Run" (1979)

"So Young" is a pop song written by Joe Camilleri, Jeff Burstin and Tony Faehse and recorded by Australian blues, rock and R&B band Jo Jo Zep & The Falcons. The song was the group's fifth single, released in September 1978 as the lead single from a 12″ EP also entitled So Young (1978).

Camilleri said of the song "It's Reggae meets son of Blues, with many different time changes. It took the band a week to learn because it was so intricate and not like anything else we'd tried." He claimed to have written the song in June 1978 and said on its release that it was not necessarily about being young, but about "innocence". He added: "For that reason the vocals are softer. I was trying to make the sound compatible with the sentiments expressed in the song."

'So Young' peaked at number 48 on the Kent Music Report in Australia, becoming the band's first top 50 single. "Everyone said that should have been a hit," Camilleri commented the following year, "but no one bought the bloody thing." A live version of 'So Young' appeared on the 'free album' included in the first 5,000 Australian pressings of their next album, Screaming Targets. The group also re-recorded the song for the internationally released version of Screaming Targets.

== Track listing ==
7″ (OZ-11794)

- Side A – "So Young" - 3:33
- Side B – "Long Distance Call" - 3:10

== Charts ==
Chart (1978)	Peak position
Australian Kent Music Report	48

== Cover versions ==
- Elvis Costello and the Attractions added the song to their live set, and recorded it in the studio, in 1979; their version of the song is included on the album Out of Our Idiot (1987)
- Frankie Miller also played the song live and included it (as 'So Young, So Young') on his 1980 album Easy Money.

== Return Home ==
In Ray Argall's 1987 film Return Home Camilleri has a brief cameo role as a busker on the Glenelg foreshore. At the behest of the character Noel (Dennis Coard), Camilleri plays a snippet of 'So Young'.
