= Live!! Loud and Clear =

EP by Jo Jo Zep & The Falcons
- Released: February 1978
- Recorded: Martini's 23 December 1977
- Genre: Rock, pop, new wave
- Label: Oz Records
- Producer: Joe Camilleri

Jo Jo Zep & The Falcons chronology
Whip It Out (1977)	Live!! Loud and Clear (1978)	So Young (1978)

Singles from Live!! Loud and Clear
- 1. "Honey Dripper" Released: May 1978

Live!! Loud and Clear is the first extended play by Australian blues, rock and R&B band Jo Jo Zep & The Falcons. Recorded in December 1977 and released in February 1978 and limited to 5,000 copies. The EP peaked at number 53 on the Australian Kent Music Report.

== Track listing ==
Side A
No.	Title	Writer(s)	Length
1.	"Honey Dripper"	Joe Liggins	4:02
2.	"Young Girl"	Don Covay	3:03
3.	"Ain't Got No Money"	Frankie Miller	3:17

Side B
No.	Title	Writer(s)	Length
1.	"Girl Across the Street"	Gary Young	5:08
2.	"Riding in the Moonlight"	Joe Camilleri	2:35

== Charts ==
Chart (1978)	Peak position
Australian Kent Music Report	53
