= Screaming Targets =

Studio album by Jo Jo Zep & the Falcons
- Released: 13 July 1979
- Recorded: 1978−79
- Studio: Armstrong Studios
- Genre: Pop rock; blues rock
- Label: Mushroom
- Producer: Peter Solley

Jo Jo Zep & The Falcons chronology
Let's Drip Awhile (1979)	Screaming Targets (1979)	Hats Off Step Lively (1980)

Singles from Screaming Targets
- 1. "Hit and Run" Released: July 1979; 2. "Shape I'm In" Released: October 1979

Professional ratings
Review scores
Source	Rating
AllMusic	3/5 stars

Screaming Targets is the fourth studio album by Australian pop rock band Jo Jo Zep & the Falcons. The album was the band's first via Mushroom Records. Released in July 1979, the album peaked at number 13 on the Australian Kent Music Report, becoming the band's first top twenty album. The album was released with a limited edition bonus record featuring songs recorded live at Sentimental Bloke Hotel, Bombay Rock, Melbourne, April 1979.

The US release, detailed below, differed slightly from the original Australian issue, and did not appear until 1980.

== Critical reception ==
"The songs and the melodies" of the album reminded critics of Billboard magazine the works of Southside Johnny and the Asbury Jukes and they expressed the thought that future possible success of Jo Jo Zep's depend on their willingness to continue to follow this style.

== Track listing (Original Australian version) ==
Side A
No.	Title	Writer(s)	Length
1.	"Hit and Run"	Joe Camilleri, Jeff Burstin, Tony Faehse	4:36
2.	"Don't Wanna Come Down"	Camilleri, Burstin, Faehse	3:28
3.	"Katschara"	Camilleri, Burstin, Faehse	4:13
4.	"Only the Lonely Hearted"	Paul Kelly	2:44
5.	"You Made a Fool Out of Me"	Mickey Jupp	4:50

Side B
No.	Title	Writer(s)	Length
1.	"Close to the Bone"	Camilleri, Burstin, Faehse	4:16
2.	"Shape I'm In"	Camilleri, Burstin, Faehse	3:30
3.	"Trials and Tribulations"	Camilleri, Burstin, Faehse	4:38
4.	"Thin Line"	Camilleri, Burstin, Faehse	3:17
5.	"Open Hearted"	Camilleri, Burstin, Faehse	4:06

Bonus live LP with original Australian issue:

Side C
No.	Title	Writer(s)	Length
1.	"Security"	Otis Redding	4:45
2.	"So Young"	Camilleri, Burstin, Faehse	3:33
3.	"Not a Woman, Not a Child"	Murray, Peters	3:25
4.	"Oh Mona"	Ellas McDaniel	6:03

Side D
No.	Title	Writer(s)	Length
1.	"Cuthulu"	Camilleri, Bruce Woodcock	9:56

== Track listing (Revised US version) ==
The US version, issued in 1980, dropped "You Made a Fool Out of Me" and added a newly-recorded studio version of "So Young".

Side A
No.	Title	Writer(s)	Length
1.	"Hit and Run"	Joe Camilleri, Jeff Burstin, Tony Faehse	4:36
2.	"Don't Wanna Come Down"	Camilleri, Burstin, Faehse	3:28
3.	"Katschara"	Camilleri, Burstin, Faehse	4:13
4.	"Only the Lonely Hearted"	Paul Kelly	2:44
5.	"So Young"	Camilleri, Burstin, Faehse	3:19

Side B
No.	Title	Writer(s)	Length
1.	"Close to the Bone"	Camilleri, Burstin, Faehse	4:16
2.	"Shape I'm In"	Camilleri, Burstin, Faehse	3:30
3.	"Trials and Tribulations"	Camilleri, Burstin, Faehse	4:38
4.	"Thin Line"	Camilleri, Burstin, Faehse	3:17
5.	"Open Hearted"	Camilleri, Burstin, Faehse	4:06

== Personnel ==
Jo Jo Zep & the Falcons

- Joe Camilleri — vocals, saxophone, guitar
- Jeff Burstin — guitar
- Tony Faehse — guitar, backing vocals
- John Power — bass, vocals
- Wilbur Wilde — sax
- Gary Young — drums

The female backing vocalists heard on several tracks are uncredited.

== Charts ==
Chart (1979–80)	Peak position
Australian Kent Music Report	13
New Zealand Albums (RMNZ)	25
