= The Honeydripper =

Song by Joe Liggins and His Honeydrippers
- Released: April 1945
- Recorded: April 20, 1945
- Genre: Rhythm and blues
- Label: Exclusive Records 207
- Songwriter(s): Joe Liggins

"The Honeydripper (Parts 1 and 2)" is an R&B song by Joe Liggins and his Honeydrippers which topped the US Billboard R&B chart (at that time called the "Race Records" chart) for 18 weeks, from September 1945 to January 1946.

== History ==
Liggins claimed to have written the tune around 1942, when playing piano in Los Angeles with a group called the California Rhythm Rascals. The tune was based around the traditional song "Shortnin' Bread". It was adopted by dancers performing a dance called the Texas Hop, and Liggins wrote words to fit the tune - "The honeydripper, he's a killer, the honeydripper ... he's a solid gold cat, he's the height of jive ... he's a riffer, the honeydripper." The term "honeydripper" was black slang for a "sweet" guy, and had already been adopted as a nickname by blues pianist Roosevelt Sykes.

Liggins tried to persuade his next bandleader, Sammy Franklin, to record it, but Franklin refused and Liggins put together his own four-man group with Little Willie Jackson (alto sax and clarinet), James Jackson Jr. (tenor sax) and a bass player. The song was heard by the owner of Exclusive Records, Leon Rene, who wanted to record it although in live shows Liggins' performance often ran to fifteen minutes. Liggins suggested cutting it down and recording it over two sides of the record, 3 minutes per side. The recording was done on April 20, 1945, with Liggins' regular bass player replaced by Red Callender and Earl Carter added on drums.

The recording was an immediate smash hit. "It was a hit booming from every record store, shoeshine stand, barber shop and barbecued chicken shack on Los Angeles' famed Central Avenue as many thousands of G.I.s returned from the Pacific, hungry for nightlife and new civilian experiences." However, the small record company could not keep up with the demand, and a cover version by Jimmie Lunceford on the larger Decca label eventually replaced it at the top of the charts. Liggins' recording has been cited as "the earliest runaway hit in the formative R&B combo style", and as such was an important precursor to the development of rock and roll. It made #13 on the Billboard pop chart.

Liggins later moved to Specialty Records and re-recorded the song in a shortened version in 1950. The original Exclusive part 1 of the song was dubbed (with another hit by Liggins on Exclusive, "I've Got a Right to Cry") and issued on 45 by Dot Records around 1956.

== Other recordings ==
Hit cover versions were also made by:

- Jimmie Lunceford (#2 R&B, 1945)
- Roosevelt Sykes (#3 R&B, 1945)
- Cab Calloway (#3 R&B, 1946)
- An instrumental jazz version is on the 1963 album Night Train by the Oscar Peterson Trio.
- Australian band Jo Jo Zep & the Falcons recorded a version and released it as the lead single from their EP Live!! Loud and Clear in 1978.
- British band the Jets released their version in 1982 which peaked at No. 58 in the UK.
- Versions were also recorded in later years by Eddie Chamblee (on The Rocking Tenor Sax of Eddie Chamblee), King Curtis, Buddy Guy and others.

"Evan's Shuffle" by Little Walter (with Muddy Waters) is based on "The Honeydripper".

== See also ==
- Billboard Most-Played Race Records of 1946
- R&B number-one hits of 1945 (USA)
