= Peter Solley =

English musician and record producer (1948–2023)

- Born: 19 October 1948; Holloway, North London, England
- Died: 16 November 2023 (aged 75) Brattleboro, Vermont, U.S.
- Occupations: Musician; record producer
- Instruments: Hammond organ; piano; keyboards
- Formerly of: Procol Harum

Peter Solley (19 October 1948 – 16 November 2023) was an English musician and record producer. He recorded with Eric Clapton, Al Stewart and Whitesnake, as well as producing records for Ted Nugent, Oingo Boingo, Motörhead, The Romantics, Jo Jo Zep, Peter Frampton, The Sports, Wreckless Eric and many others.

== Biography ==
At the age of 13, he won a scholarship to Trinity College of Music in London and after graduating became a session musician. In the late 1960s he played in The Thunderbirds, the backing group for vocalist Chris Farlowe, and was also in the backing band of singer Terry Reid, who toured with The Rolling Stones and Cream in the United States in 1968. During 1969 and 1970 he served as touring organist for The Crazy World of Arthur Brown.

Solley was a founding member of British progressive rock band Paladin, whose second LP Paladin Charge! featured a cover design by Roger Dean. Following the break-up of Paladin in 1973, Solley joined Fox, which had a series of hit singles before breaking up in 1977. In 1973-75 he was a member of SNAFU, playing and singing on two of their three albums.

After turning down membership in several groups, in 1976 Solley became a member of the progressive rock group Procol Harum playing organ and synthesisers, (this allowed Chris Copping to take over on bass guitar). During his time with the group he recorded one album, Something Magic, and toured extensively to promote the album. Shortly afterwards the group broke up.

In 1978 he joined the newly founded Whitesnake recording their debut EP Snakebite. On the sleeve, he was credited as a special guest, but he continued touring with the band until July 1978. His position in the band was later taken by Jon Lord. The following year he provided the string arrangement for "Smithers-Jones" on The Jam's Setting Sons album.

In the 1980s, Solley began writing TV jingles for clients including British Airways, BMW, and Coca-Cola, and he became a record producer. His credits include albums for the Australian bands Sports (Don't Throw Stones) and Jo Jo Zep & The Falcons (Screaming Targets, Hats Off Step Lively) and the 1982 Jo Jo Zep album Cha, featuring the novelty salsa-rock hit "Taxi Mary" with duet vocals by Jane Clifton. Solley's best-known production is the 1979 single "What I Like About You" by The Romantics. He also produced the Grammy nominated album, 1916 by Motörhead. He has produced albums for Ted Nugent, Peter Frampton, Mountain, and others, several receiving Grammy nominations, and arranged strings for The Jam several times. His songs have appeared on the Billboard charts, he's played jazz, and conducted the New York Philharmonic strings.

In 1997, he briefly re-joined Procol Harum for a concert in Redhill and, in 2004, played with their lead singer Gary Brooker in a concert in Guildford.

Solley was of Romanian descent, his grandparents were from Romania. His father was Leslie Solley, a British politician and barrister.

Solley died on 16 November 2023, at the age of 75.
