= Jon Stevens discography =

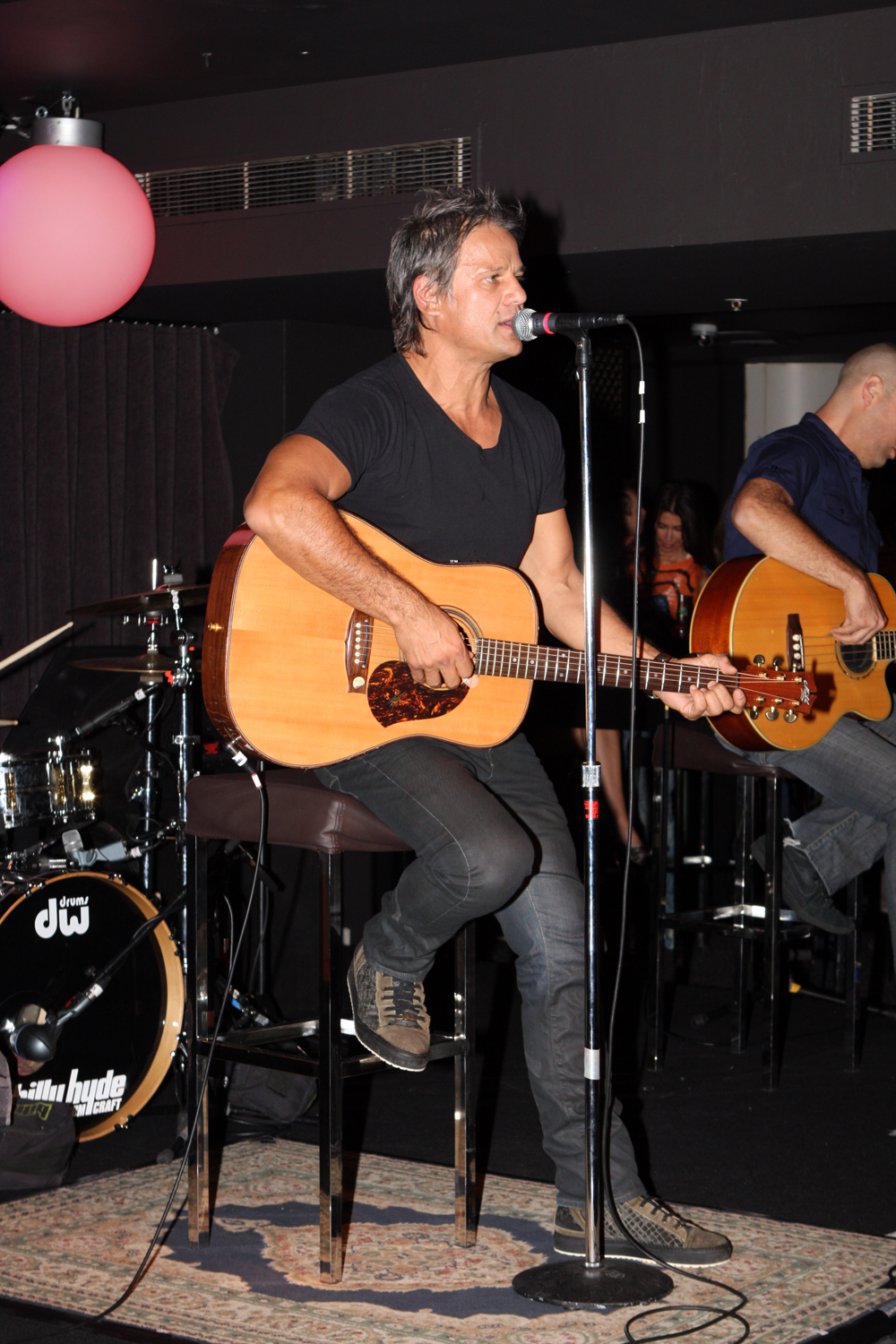
- Jon Stevens in 2012
- Studio albums: 11
- Soundtrack albums: 1
- Singles: 32

The following is a complete discography of every album and single released by New Zealand-born Australian rock music artist Jon Stevens.

== Studio albums ==
List of studio albums, with selected chart positions and certifications
Title	Album details	Peak chart positions		Certifications
Title	Album details	AUS	NZ	Certifications
Jezebel	Released: February 1980; Label: CBS (SBP237419); Format: Vinyl, cassette	—	7	NZ: Gold
Jon Stevens	Released: 1982; Label: Big Time (BT 7003) CBS (SBP237766); Format: Vinyl, cassette	—	—	
Are U Satisfied	Released: October 1993; Label: Columbia (474668 2); Format: CD, cassette	27	—	
Circle	Released: November 1996; Label: Columbia (485496 2); Format: CD, cassette	124	—	
Ain't No Life for the Faint Hearted	Released: October 2004; Label: Circle Music (CIRC001); Format: CD, cassette	—	—	
The Works	Released: 2005; Label: Liberation (Blue086.2); Format: CD, cassette	132	—	
Changing Times	Released: September 2011; Label: Universal Music Australia; Format: CD, digital download	—	—	
Testify!	Released: 11 November 2011; Label: Universal Music Australia; Format: CD, digital download	115	—	
Woman	Released: 18 September 2015; Label: Social Family; Format: CD, digital download	86	—	
Starlight	Released: 31 March 2017; Label: Liberation; Format: CD, digital download	16	—	
Shimmer	Released: 8 October 2025; Label: Circle Music; Format: CD, digital download	30	—	

== Soundtrack albums ==
List of compilation albums, with selected chart positions and certifications
Title	Album details	Peak chart positions	Certifications
Title	Album details	AUS	Certifications
Jesus Christ Superstar	Released: July 1992; Label: Polydor (513 713 2); Format: Vinyl, cassette	1	AUS: 4× Platinum

== Singles ==
=== As lead artist ===
Title	Year	Peak chart positions		Album
Title	Year	AUS	NZ	Album
"Jezebel"	1979	94	1	Jezebel
"Montego Bay"	1980	—	1	Jezebel
"Don't Let Love Go" (with Sharon O'Neill)	1980	—	5	Jezebel
"Loving You (Is a Way of Life)"	1980	—	28	non-album singles
"Working Class Game"	1980	—	—	non-album singles
"Running Away"	1982	—	—	Jon Stevens
"Lover My Love"	1982	—	—	Jon Stevens
"Everything's Alright" (with John Farnham and Kate Ceberano)	1992	6	—	Jesus Christ Superstar
"Superstar"	1992	55	—	Jesus Christ Superstar
"Going Down"	1993	39	—	Are U Satisfied
"Reflections"	1994	60	—	Are U Satisfied
"I Wish It Would Rain"	1994	67	49	non-album single
"When"	1996	58	—	Circle
"Two Tribes"	1997	168	—	non-album singles
"Carry the Flame"	2000	124	—	non-album singles
"See You Round"	2004	—	—	Ain't No Life For The Faint Hearted
"Just a Man"	2011	—	—	Changing Times
"(I Wanna) Testify"	2011	—	—	Testify!
"Woman"	2015	—	—	Woman
"Hold On"	2017	—	—	Starlight
"Feel Like Let Go"	2017	—	—	Starlight
"Rain Down on Me"	2018	—	—	
"Shimmer"	2025	—	—	Shimmer
"So Beautiful"	2025	—	—	Shimmer
"Your Bubble"	2025	—	—	Shimmer
"Paradise"	2025	—	—	Shimmer
"Gonna Get It"	2025	—	—	Shimmer
"Trippin'"	2025	—	—	Shimmer
"Waiting for You"	2025	—	—	Shimmer

=== As featured artist ===
Title	Year	Peak chart positions	Notes
Title	Year	AUS	Notes
"Last One Standing for You" (Black Sorrows featuring Jon Stevens)	1994	46	From the Black Sorrows album Lucky Charm
"Touch" (Sound Sneakerz featuring Jon Stevens)	2012	—	non-album single
"Spirit of the Anzacs" (Lee Kernaghan featuring Guy Sebastian, Sheppard, Jon Stevens, Jessica Mauboy, Shannon Noll and Megan Washington)	2015	32	First single from Kernaghan's album Spirit of the Anzacs. The single was released to raise money for Legacy and Soldier On.
