= Greatest Hits (Noiseworks album) =

1992 compilation album by Noiseworks

Compilation album by Noiseworks
- Released: 2 October 1992
- Recorded: 1986–1992
- Genres: Rock; pop; pub rock
- Length: 61:13
- Label: Columbia

Noiseworks chronology
Love Versus Money (1991)	Greatest Hits (1992)	The Essential Noiseworks (2007)

Singles from Greatest Hits
- 1. "Let It Be (live)" Released: 1992

Greatest Hits is the first compilation album by Australian rock band Noiseworks. Released in 1992, it peaked at No. 4 in Australia and was certified platinum in 1993.

== Background ==
After releasing three studio albums, Noiseworks completed a national tour in March 1992 and disbanded shortly after. Band member, Jon Stevens pursued opportunities on a different kind of stage and starred as Judas in the 1992 highly acclaimed and successful Australian Musical Production of Andrew Lloyd Webber's Jesus Christ Superstar.

A greatest hit album was released to collate the group's singles and included three Australian top twenty singles, "Take Me Back", "Touch" and "Hot Chilli Woman". The songs appear in chronological order of release. A live recording of the Beatles' song "Let It Be" was released as the first and only single. It was recorded at their live concert in March 1992.

== Track listing ==
1. "No Lies" – 3:53
2. "Take Me Back" – 3:26
3. "Welcome to the World" – 4:43
4. "Love Somebody" – 4:24
5. "Burning Feeling" – 3:55
6. "Touch" – 5:03
7. "Simple Man" – 3:48
8. "Voice of Reason" – 4:12
9. "In My Youth" – 3:32
10. "Freedom" – 3:17
11. "Miles & Miles" – 4:13
12. "Hot Chilli Woman" – 3:23
13. "R.I.P. (Millie)" – 4:34
14. "Take You Higher" (with Vika & Linda Bull) – 3:35
15. "Let It Be" (live) – 5:15

== Chart positions ==
=== Weekly charts ===
Greatest Hits debuted at No. 16 in Australia and peaked at No. 4 two weeks later.

Chart (1992–1993)	Peak position
Australian Albums (ARIA)	4

=== Year-end charts ===
Chart (1992)	Rank
Australian Albums Chart	34

== Certifications ==
Region	Certification	Certified units/sales
Australia (ARIA)	Platinum	70,000^{^}
^{^} Shipments figures based on certification alone.
