= Live + Loud =

Live album by Noiseworks
- Released: 2008
- Recorded: October 2007
- Venue: Crown Casino, Melbourne
- Genre: Rock, pop
- Length: 66:07
- Label: Noiseworks Pty Ltd
- Producer: Steve Balbi

Noiseworks chronology
The Essential Noiseworks (2007)	Live + Loud (2008)	Evolution (2022)

Live + Loud is the first live album by Australian rock band Noiseworks, released in 2008. It was recorded at The Palms Crown Casino, Australia in October 2007. The album includes one new track "Let It Go".

== Track listing ==
CD/ DD (NW08-LIVE)

1. "Touch" - 5:24
2. "Burning Feeling" - 4:04
3. "Love Somebody" - 4:41
4. "Simple Man" - 4:23
5. "Miles & Miles" - 4:19
6. "Let It Go" - 3:41
7. "Keep Me Running" - 5:14
8. "Everyday People" - 5:40
9. "R.I.P. (Millie)" - 4:57
10. "Voice Of Reason" - 4:27
11. "No Lies" - 4:00
12. "Take Me Back" - 4:42
13. "Freedom" - 5:31
14. "Hot Chilli Woman" - 3:37
15. "Rock N Roll" - 1:47

== Credits ==
- Art Direction, Design – Gino Campagnaro
- Bass, Executive-Producer – Steve Balbi
- Drums – Kevin Nicol
- Guitar – Stuart Fraser
- Keyboards – Scott Aplin
- Mastered By – Paul Gomersall
- Mixed By – Tony Wall
- Vocals, Executive-Producer – Jon Stevens
