= Gimme Ted =

2003 video album by Various Artists

Gimme Ted – The Ted Mulry Benefit Concerts

Video by Various Artists
- Released: 19 May 2003
- Recorded: 9–10 March 2001
- Venue: City Live, Fox Studios, Sydney
- Genre: Pop, rock
- Length: 382:00
- Label: RBC/Warner
- Director: Bernie Zelvis
- Producer: Philip Deamer

Gimme Ted, or more fully Gimme Ted – The Ted Mulry Benefit Concerts, is an Australian 2×DVD video and tribute album by Various Artists, which was released on 19 May 2003. It was recorded at two eponymous benefit concerts on 9 and 10 March 2001, with "some of Australia's finest musicians from the past and present" as well as "One-off reunions of classic bands." The artists were honouring rock musician Ted Mulry, who had been diagnosed with a terminal brain tumour in the previous year. The shows were compèred by Glenn A. Baker, Donnie Sutherland and Ray Burgess.

Mulry's backing band, the Ted Mulry Gang (TMG) performed on both nights with his brother Steve Mulry substituting on lead vocals. Australian groups reuniting for the concerts included Sherbet, Sebastian Hardie (with Jon English), the Masters Apprentices and INXS (with both Richard Clapton and Jon Stevens on vocals). The performances raised $170,000 for his medical costs; Mulry subsequently died on 1 September 2001.

== Background ==
Ted Mulry (1947 – 2001), was an English-born Australian singer, songwriter, bass player and guitarist. From September 1972 he led his own band, Ted Mulry Gang or TMG. They had a number-one hit single on the Kent Music Report with "Jump in My Car" (1975) and top ten appearances with a cover version of "Darktown Strutters' Ball" (1976), "Jamaica Rum" (1977) and "My Little Girl" (1977). The group disbanded in 1986. Mulry announced in February 2001 that he had been diagnosed in the previous year with a terminal brain tumour. On 9 and 10 March 2001 various music artists responded with Gimme Ted, two benefit concerts. They were compèred by music critic Glenn A. Baker and television presenters Donnie Sutherland and Ray Burgess. Ted Mulry Gang (TMG) performed on both nights with his younger brother Steve Mulry substituting on lead vocals.

Australian groups had reformed for the concerts: Sherbet, Sebastian Hardie (with Jon English), the Masters Apprentices and INXS (with both Richard Clapton and Jon Stevens on vocals). The gigs raised $170,000 for his medical costs; Mulry subsequently died on 1 September 2001. Performances were recorded for a 2×DVD video tribute album, Gimme Ted|Gimme Ted – The Ted Mulry Benefit Concerts (May 2003). Penne Dennison interviewed people backstage for Foxtel's Music Country, which was broadcast on 14 April 2001. Network 10 aired a one-hour special on 15 April showing live footage of performers. The video albums were produced by Philip Deamer and directed by Bernie Zelvis for RBC Entertainment. Aside from concert footage, the DVDs include TMG music videos, interviews with performers and a documentary. Royalties from the video album funded Support Act, an Australian charity for musicians.

== Track listing ==
- Various Artists – Gimme Ted – The Ted Mulry Benefit Concerts (19 May 2003) RBC Entertainment/Warner Music Australasia (2564600802, DAVID1888) Performed at City Live, Fox Studios, Sydney on 9 and 10 March 2001.

Disc 1: Friday Night 9th March 2001
No.	Title	Writer(s)	Performer(s)	Length
1.	"Where the Action Is"	Vanda & Young	John Paul Young
2.	"I Hate the Music"	Vanda & Young	John Paul Young
3.	"Yesterday's Hero"	Vanda & Young	John Paul Young
4.	"Turn Up Your Radio"	Jim Keays, Doug Ford	The Masters Apprentices
5.	"Because I Love You"	Keays, Ford	The Masters Apprentices
6.	"Deep Water"	Richard Clapton	Richard Clapton and INXS
7.	"Glory Road"	Clapton	Richard Clapton and INXS
8.	"Ace of Hearts"	Clapton	Richard Clapton and INXS
9.	"I Am an Island"	Clapton	Richard Clapton and INXS
10.	"Wings of an Eagle"	Russell Morris	Russell Morris
11.	"The Real Thing"	Johnny Young	Russell Morris
12.	"Take a Long Line"	Doc Neeson, John Brewster, Rick Brewster	members of the Angels
13.	"No Secrets"	Neeson, Graham Bidstrup	members of the Angels
14.	"I Ain't the One"	Neeson, J Brewster, R Brewster	members of the Angels
15.	"Marseilles"	Neeson, J Brewster, R Brewster	members of the Angels
16.	"I Come in Peace"	Ross Wilson, R Brewster	Ross Wilson
17.	"Cool World"	Wilson	Ross Wilson
18.	"Come Back Again"	Wilson	Ross Wilson
19.	"Eagle Rock"	Wilson	Ross Wilson
20.	"Darktown Strutters Ball"	Shelton Brooks	TMG with Steve Mulry
21.	"Denim and Lace"	Laurence Lister, Francis Lyons	Marty Rhone
22.	"Rock Me Baby"	Joe Bihari; B.B. King	Billy Thorpe
23.	"Poison Ivy"	Leiber and Stoller	Billy Thorpe
24.	"Most People I Know Think That I'm Crazy"	Thorpe	Billy Thorpe
25.	"Got My Mojo Working"	Preston Foster	Billy Thorpe
26.	"Good Times"	Vanda & Young	Billy Thorpe and INXS

Disc 2: Friday Night 10th March 2001
No.	Title	Writer(s)	Performer(s)	Length
1.	"Rock 'n' Roll Outlaw"	Gary "Angry" Anderson, Michael Cocks, Gordon Leach, Dallas "Digger" Royall, Peter Wells	Rose Tattoo
2.	"Nice Boys Don't"	Leach, Anderson, Royall, Wells, Cocks	Rose Tattoo
3.	"Bad Boy for Love"	Ian Rilen	Rose Tattoo
4.	"One of the Boys"	Leach, Anderson, Royall, Wells, Cocks	Rose Tattoo
5.	"We Can't Be Beaten"	Anderson, Robin Riley	Rose Tattoo
6.	"Strange Imagination"	Kevin Borich	Kevin Borich
7.	"Voodoo Chile"	Jimi Hendrix	Kevin Borich
8.	"Gonna See My Baby Tonight"	Borich	Kevin Borich
9.	"Openings"	Mario Millo, Toivo Pilt, Alex Plavsic, Peter Plavsic	Sebastian Hardie
10.	"Turn the Page"	Bob Seger	Jon English
11.	"Hollywood 7"	Gloria Sklerov, Harry Lloyd	Jon English
12.	"Julia"	Martin "Ted" Mulry	Tim Freedman
13.	"Falling in Love Again"	Vanda & Young	Tim Freedman
14.	"Darktown Strutters Ball"	Brooks	TMG with Steve Mulry
15.	"Jump in My Car"	Ted Mulry	TMG with Steve Mulry
16.	"Fine Line"	Martin Murphy, David Barraclough	Mental As Anything
17.	"Live It Up"	Andrew "Greedy" Smith	Mental As Anything
18.	"The Nips Are Getting Bigger"	Murphy	Mental As Anything
19.	"Beatin' Around the Bush"	Wayne Burt	Adam Brand
20.	"Looking Through the Eyes of a Beautiful Girl"	Tommy Swarbrigg	Autumn
21.	"Yellow River"	Jeffrey Christie	Autumn
22.	"Summer Holiday"	Brian Nichol	The Radiators
23.	"No Tragedy"	Geoffrey Turner	The Radiators
24.	"Unsophisticated"	Turner	The Radiators
25.	"Gimme Head"	Turner	The Radiators
26.	"Darktown Strutters Ball"	Brooks	The Radiators
27.	"17"	Nichol	The Radiators
28.	"Comin' Home"	Turner	The Radiators
29.	"Freedom"	Steve Balbi, Stuart Fraser, Justin Stanley, Jon Stevens	Noiseworks
30.	"No Lies"	Stevens, Brent Thomas	Noiseworks
31.	"Reach Out"	Stevens, Fraser, Stanley	Noiseworks
32.	"Miles & Miles"	Balbi, Fraser, Stanley, Stevens	Noiseworks
33.	"Jealousy"	Stevens, Balbi, Stanley	Noiseworks
34.	"Everyday People"	Fraser, Balbi, Stevens, Stanley	Noiseworks
35.	"Take Me Back"	Stevens, Thomas	Noiseworks
36.	"Hot Chilli Woman"	Balbi, Stanley	Noiseworks
37.	"Summer Love"	Garth Porter, Clive Shakespeare	Sherbet
38.	"Hound Dog"	Leiber and Stoller	Sherbet
