= The Works (Jon Stevens album) =

Studio album by Jon Stevens
- Released: 14 November 2005
- Recorded: Eastern Bloc Studios, Melbourne; The Basement
- Genres: Acoustic, blues music
- Length: 53:48
- Label: Liberation Blue
- Producer: Jon Stevens

Jon Stevens chronology
Ain't No Life For The Faint Hearted (2004)	The Works (2005)	Changing Times (2011)

The Works is an acoustic studio album by Australian singer-songwriter, Jon Stevens. It was released on the Liberation Blue label in November 2005 and features Stevens performing well known Noiseworks songs as well as tracks from his previous studio album Ain't No Life for the Faint Hearted and a cover of John Lennon's "Jealous Guy". The album peaked at number 132 on the ARIA Charts in March 2006.

Tracks 1–11 are recorded at Eastern Bloc Studios, Melbourne. Tracks 12–14 are recorded at The Basement

In 2006, Stevens toured alongside Ian Moss with the “Six Strings & The Works”.

== Track listing ==
1. "Stand Alone" - 2:45
2. "Love Vs. Money" - 3:53
3. "Touch" - 4:20
4. "Take Me Back" - 3:23
5. "Rock With Me" - 4:01
6. "Light My Fire" - 3:43
7. "Get Low" - 4:17
8. "Jealous Guy" - 3:45
9. "Miles & Miles" -4:01
10. "Freedom" - 4:24
11. "R.I.P. (Millie)" - 4:08
12. "In My Youth" - 4:00
13. "Simple Man" - 3:31
14. "Hot Chilli Woman" - 3:36

== Credits ==
- Chris Bekker - acoustic bass
- Peter Gavin - piano, organ, Wurlitzer organ
- Simon Hosford - acoustic guitar
- Tony Kopa - rap vocals, percussion, background vocals

== Charts ==
Chart (2005–2006)	Peak position
Australian Albums (ARIA Charts)	132
