= Evolution (Noiseworks album) =

Studio album by Noiseworks
- Released: 11 November 2022
- Length: 33:54
- Label: Noiseworks
- Producer: Steve Balbi

Noiseworks chronology
| Live + Loud (2008) | Evolution (2022) |

Singles from Evolution
- 1. "Heart & Soul" Released: 15 August 2022

Evolution is the fourth studio album by Australian rock band Noiseworks. It was the band's first since 1991's Love Versus Money. Released on 11 November 2022, Evolution debuted at number 25 on the ARIA Albums Chart.

== Background and release ==
Noiseworks released their third studio album Love Versus Money in July 1991. The album became their first ARIA number-one album and the band split up shortly after.

In 1999, lead singer Jon Stevens attempted a reunion of the band, but joined INXS instead. In 2007, Noiseworks reformed and began recording material. In 2011, the original members reformed for the Red Hot Summer tour and again in 2013, they performed at Stone Fest in Sydney.

In August 2022, Noiseworks announced the release of single "Heart & Soul", their first single in 30 years. Upon release, Stevens said "Coming back after 30 years with new music and seeing the level of excitement that we have had from our Noiseworks fans has been a really powerful experience for us. 'Heart & Soul' shows where we are now while also giving a nod to the sounds that make us Noiseworks."

Evolution was scheduled for release in October 2022, but was delayed and released on 11 November 2022.

== Reception ==
Professional ratings
Review scores
| Source | Rating |
|---|---|
| The Courier-Mail | 3/5 stars |
| The Rock Pit | 9/10 |

John O'Brien from The Courier-Mail wrote: "As the title suggests they're now older, wiser and a little more world-weary, though Jon Stevens' vocals are as commanding as ever".

Sean Bennett from The Rock Pit gave the album 9/10, opining that "Evolution is a collection of ten songs which take us on a journey from radio friendly rockers to emotive ballads and anthemic sing-a-longs, littered with positive messages of light, love and hope after times of darkness... they deliver an album of high quality and maturity."

== Track listing ==
Evolution track listing
| No. | Title | Writer(s) | Length |
|---|---|---|---|
| 1. | "Heart & Soul" | Steve Balbi; Stuart Fraser; Kevin Nicol; Justin Stanley; Jon Stevens | 3:19 |
| 2. | "Amerika" | Balbi; Fraser; Stevens | 3:00 |
| 3. | "Stand Up" | Balbi; Stevens | 3:03 |
| 4. | "Long Way" | Balbi; Fraser; Nicol; Stevens | 4:11 |
| 5. | "Sunshine" | Balbi; Stanley; Stevens | 4:11 |
| 6. | "Low" | Balbi; Stevens | 3:37 |
| 7. | "One in a Million" | Balbi; Stevens | 3:28 |
| 8. | "Let It Go" | Balbi; Fraser; Nicol; Stevens | 3:29 |
| 9. | "Ocean Girl" | Balbi; Stevens | 4:40 |
| 10. | "Touch (Epitaph)" | Balbi; Fraser; Nicol; Stanley; Stevens | 0:56 |
| Total length: | | | 33:54 |

== Charts ==
Chart performance for Evolution
| Chart (2022) | Peak position |
|---|---|
| Australian Albums (ARIA) | 25 |
