= The Very Best of The Black Sorrows =

The Very Best of the Black Sorrows

Greatest hits album by The Black Sorrows
- Released: 1997
- Recorded: 1984–1996
- Length: 144:28
- Label: Mushroom

The Black Sorrows chronology
Radio Waves (1996)	The Very Best of the Black Sorrows (1997)	Beat Club (1998)

The Very Best of the Black Sorrows is the second greatest hits album by Australian rock and blues band The Black Sorrows. The album includes 38 songs from the band's entire career and includes singles and album tracks, all of which are digitally remastered. The album was released in Australia in 1997 and internationally on 25 August 1998. The album is considered a collector's item by The Black Sorrows' fans.

== Track listing ==
CD1

1. "Lucky Charm" (Joe Camilleri, Nick Smith) - 4:17
2. "Brown Eyed Girl" (Van Morrison) - 5:49
3. "Dear Children" (Joe Camilleri, Nick Smith) - 3:49
4. "Dance With Me" (Joe Camilleri, Nick Smith) - 3:50
5. "Country Girls" (Joe Camilleri, Nick Smith) - 4:55
6. "Snake Skin Shoes" (Joe Camilleri, Jeff Griffin) - 4:08
7. "Hot Burrito #1" (Chris Ethridge, Gram Parsons) - 3:56
8. "Harley + Rose" (Joe Camilleri, Nick Smith) - 4:03
9. "I Gotta Find a Way to Win Maria Back" (Johnny Bristol) - 4:20
10. "The Chosen Ones" (Joe Camilleri, Nick Smith) - 3:27
11. "Caribbean Wind" (Bob Dylan) - 1:03
12. "Mystified" (Joe Camilleri, Nick Smith) - 4:29
13. "Down to the Sea" (Joe Camilleri, Nick Smith) - 4:33
14. "Hold it up to the Mirror" (Joe Camilleri, Nick Smith) - 2:28
15. "Baby It's a Crime" (Joe Camilleri, Nick Smith) - 3:26
16. "The Big Time" (Joe Camilleri, Nick Smith) - 3:34
17. "You Better Move On" (Arthur Alexander) - 3:23
18. "Sons of the Sea" (Joe Camilleri, Nick Smith) - 4:22
19. "Don't Look Back" (John Lee Hooker) - 3:12

CD2

1. "New Craze" (Joe Camilleri, Nick Smith, The Black Sorrows) - 4:55
2. "Ain't Love the Strangest Thing" (Joe Camilleri) - 3:30
3. "What Does It Take (To Win Your Love)" (Johnny Bristol, Vernon Bullock, Harvey Fuqua) - 3:16
4. "Hold On to Me" (Joe Camilleri, Nick Smith) - 3:51
5. "Better Times" (Joe Camilleri) - 4:09
6. "Daughters of Glory" (Joe Camilleri, Nick Smith) - 4:41
7. "Chained to the Wheel" (Joe Camilleri, Nick Smith) - 3:41
8. "Never Let Me Go" (Joe Camilleri, Nick Smith) - 3:52
9. "Last One Standing for You" (with Jon Stevens) (Joe Camilleri, Jeff Griffin) - 3:19
10. "Do Right Woman, Do Right Man" (Chips Moman, Dan Penn) - 4:07
11. "Sweet Way Out" (Joe Camilleri, Nick Smith) - 4:50
12. "A Place in the World" (Joe Camilleri, Nick Smith) - 4:33
13. "Come on, Come On" (Joe Camilleri) - 3:53
14. "Oh Darling" (Kieran Kane, Jamie O'Hara) = 5:43
15. "Tupelo Honey" (Van Morrison) - 3:56
16. "Stir It Up" (Bob Marley) - 3:57
17. "The Crack Up" (Joe Camilleri, Nick Smith) - 3:22
18. "Mystery Ship" (Joe Camilleri, Nick Smith) - 3:49
19. "Dance With Me" (Joe Camilleri, Nick Smith) - 3:13

== Release history ==
Region	Date	Format	Label	Catalogue
Australia	1997	CD, Cassette	Mushroom Records	MUSH33049-2
Worldwide	25 August 1998	CD	Mushroom Records	
