= Jezebel (disambiguation) =

Jezebel was a biblical figure, the wife of King Ahab.

Jezebel(s) or Dyesebel may also refer to:

== Butterflies ==
- Delias, a genus of butterflies in the family Pieridae commonly called the Jezebels
- Common Jezebel, Delias eucharis, a species of butterfly
- Painted Jezebel, Delias hyparete, a species of butterfly

== Entertainment, news, and media ==
- Jezebel (1938 film), a film starring Bette Davis and Henry Fonda
- Jezebel (2019 film), a film starring Tiffany Tenille and Numa Perrier
- Jezebel (website), a website aimed at women
- Jézabel, a novel by Irène Némirovsky published in 1936
- Jezabel (TV series), a Brazilian television series
- Jezabel (2015), a French webseries
- "Jezebels" (The Handmaid's Tale), a television episode

== Characters ==
- Dyesebel, a fictional mermaid character in the Philippines
- Jezebel Baley, the wife of the character Elijah Baley in Isaac Asimov's Robot novels
- Jezebel or Jizabel Disraeli, a character in Kaori Yuki's manga series Earl Cain

== Music ==
- Jezebel (album), a 1980 album by Jon Stevens
- The Jezabels, a band from Sydney, Australia

=== Songs ===
- "Jezebel" (Frankie Laine song), 1951
- "Jezebel" (Chely Wright song), 2001
- "Jezebel" (Jon Stevens song), 1979
- "Jezebel" (The Rasmus song), 2022
- "Jezebel", a song by 10,000 Maniacs on the album Our Time in Eden
- "Jezebel", a song by Acid Bath on the album When the Kite String Pops
- "Jezebel", a song by Boyz II Men on the album II
- "Jezebel", a song by Depeche Mode on the album Sounds of the Universe
- "Jezebel", a song by Dizzee Rascal on the album Boy in da Corner
- "Jezebel", a song by The Drones on the album Gala Mill
- "Jezebel", a song by Giveon on the album Beloved: Act II
- "Jezebel", a song by Herman's Hermits on the album There's a Kind of Hush All Over the World
- "Jezebel", a song by Iron & Wine on the album Woman King
- "Jezebel", a song by Joan Jett on the album Bad Reputation
- "Jezebel", a song by Ky-Mani Marley on the album Radio
- "Jezebel", a song by Memphis May Fire on the album Challenger
- "Jezebel", a song by PG Roxette on the album Pop-Up Dynamo!
- "Jezabel", a song by Ricky Martin on the album Sound Loaded
- "Jezebel", a song by Recoil on the album Liquid
- "Jezebel", a song by The Reverend Horton Heat on the album Liquor in the Front
- "Jezebel", a song by Sade on the album Promise
- "Jezebel", a song by The Specials on the album Skinhead Girl
- "Jezebel", a song by Two Hours Traffic on the album Isolator
- "Jezebel", a song by War of Ages on the album Void

== Other uses ==
- Jezebel, a prophetess in the church of Thyatira in Revelation 2:20
- "Jezebel", a stereotype of a sexually voracious black woman and historical example of a negative stereotype
- Jezebel, a historic fire engine maintained by the RCS Motor Club
- Jezebel, a bare critical experiment at Los Alamos National Laboratory made of plutonium
- A family of US airborne long-range passive sonobuoy systems, including AN/AQA-3, AQA-4, AQA-5 and AQA-7
- Project Jezebel, part of the research for SOSUS (Sound Surveillance System)
