= Radio Waves (The Black Sorrows album) =

Live album by The Black Sorrows
- Released: November 1996
- Genre: Folk rock; pop rock; Country music; Soul music; Funk music
- Label: Head Records, Mushroom
- Producer: Joe Camilleri

The Black Sorrows chronology
Lucky Charm (1994)	Radio Waves (1996)	The Very Best of The Black Sorrows (1997)

Radio Waves is the first live album by Australian rock band The Black Sorrows. The album was mastered in Studios 301 and released in November 1996. The album contained 36 tracks. The album was released digitally in 2008.

== Track listing ==
(all songs written by Joe Camilleri and Nick Smith unless otherwise noted.)

CD1

1. "Last One Standing For You" (Camilleri, Polec, Griffin)
2. "Lucky Charm"
3. "Daughters of Glory"
4. "Mystified"
5. "Harley + Rose"
6. "Hold On To Me"
7. "Never Let Me Go"
8. "Come On in My Kitchen" (Robert Johnson)
9. "Country Girls"
10. "The Chosen Ones"
11. "Stir It Up" (Bob Marley)
12. "Hey Mama" (Chewier)

CD2

1. "Rise and Fall"
2. "Better Times" (Camilleri, Polec)
3. "Bone Man" (Camilleri, Griffin)
4. "Brown Eyed Girl" (Van Morrison)
5. "Chained to the Wheel"
6. "Come On, Come On" (Camilleri, Polec)
7. "Snake Skin Shoes" (Camilleri, Griffin)
8. "Stella" (Camilleri, Polec)
9. "Corrine, Corrina" (Armenter "Bo Carter" Chatmon, Mitchell Parish, J. Mayo Williams)
10. "Fire Down Below"
11. "Promised Land" (Chuck Berry)
12. "Down to the Sea"
13. "Ain't Love the Strangest Thing" (Camilleri, Polec)
14. "Angel Street"
15. "Crack Up"

CD3

1. "Big Time"
2. "Radio Was King"
3. "I Just Want to Make Love to You" (Willie Nelson)
4. "Nobody Can Tell"
5. "Blue Horizon"
6. "Tears For The Bride"
7. "Glory Bound"
8. "Shape I'm In" (Joe Camilleri, Jeff Burstin, Tony Faehse)
9. "Life's Sad Parade"
