= Loving You (Is a Way of Life) =

Single by Jon Stevens

from the album Jezebel
- A-side: "Loving You (Is a Way of Life)"
- B-side: "The Honeymoon is Over"
- Released: June 1980
- Genre: Pop rock
- Label: CBS Records
- Songwriter(s): Albert Hammond, Tom Snow, Franne Golde
- Producer(s): Steve Robinson

Jon Stevens singles chronology
"Don't Let Love Go" (1980)	"Loving You (Is a Way of Life)" (1980)	"Working Class Game" (1980)

"'Loving You (Is a Way of Life)" is a song recorded by New Zealand singer-songwriter, Jon Stevens. The song was produced by Steve Robinson. It was released in June 1980 as Stevens' fourth single and peaked at number 28 in New Zealand.

The track is not included on his debut album, Jezebel, however the B-side track, "The Honeymoon is Over" is.

== Track listing ==
Vinyl, 7", 45 RPM

1. "Loving You (Is a Way of Life)"
2. "The Honeymoon is Over"

== Charts ==
Chart (1980)	Peak position
New Zealand Singles Chart	28
