= Noiseworks (album) =

Studio album by Noiseworks
- Released: June 1987
- Genre: Rock
- Label: CBS
- Producer: Mark Opitz

Noiseworks chronology
Noiseworks (1987)	Touch (1988)

Singles from Noiseworks
- 1. "No Lies" Released: 13 October 1986; 2. "Take Me Back" Released: 13 April 1987; 3. "Love Somebody" Released: 3 August 1987; 4. "Welcome to the World" Released: 16 November 1987; 5. "Burning Feeling" Released: 14 March 1988

Professional ratings
Review scores
Source	Rating
AllMusic	4/5 stars

Noiseworks is the debut album by Australian rock band, Noiseworks. It was released by CBS Records on June 19, 1987. The album peaked at No. 6 on the Kent Music Report Albums Chart, with the introduction of the ARIA Album Charts in the beginning of 1988, the album was still in the charts at No. 37. Noiseworks sold more than 210,000 copies (3× platinum) in Australia.

== Track listing ==
No.	Title	Writer(s)	Length
1.	"Burning Feeling"	Jon Stevens, Stuart Fraser	3:56
2.	"Love Somebody"	Stevens, Fraser	4:24
3.	"Take Me Back"	Stevens, Brent Thomas	3:27
4.	"No Lies"	Stevens, Thomas	3:54
5.	"River of Tears"	Stevens, Fraser, Justin Stanley	5:17
6.	"Welcome to the World"	Stevens, Fraser, Stanley, Steve Balbi, Kevin Nicol	5:08
7.	"Edge of Darkness"	Stevens, Fraser, Stanley	3:45
8.	"Little Bit More"	Stevens, Thomas	3:19
9.	"Only Loving You"	Steve Balbi	4:02
10.	"It's Time"	Stevens, Balbi, Stanley, K. O'Reilly	4:51

== Personnel ==
=== Musicians ===
- Steve Balbi – bass
- Stuart Fraser – guitar
- Kevin Nicol – drums
- Justin Stanley – keyboards
- Jon Stevens – vocals

=== Production ===
- Mastering – Leon Zervos
- Engineer – Alan Wright
- Assistant engineers – Heidi Cannavo, John Darwish, Mark Roberts, Paul Kosky, Paula Jones
- Photography – Gary Heery
- Produced – Mark Opitz

== Charts ==
Chart (1987–1988)	Peak position
Australian Albums (Kent Music Report)	6
New Zealand Albums (RMNZ)	31
Swedish Albums (Sverigetopplistan)	43

== Certifications ==
Region	Certification	Certified units/sales
Australia (ARIA)	3× Platinum	210,000^{^}
^{^} Shipments figures based on certification alone.
