= Touch (Noiseworks album) =

Studio album by Noiseworks
- Released: 14 November 1988
- Genre: Pub rock
- Label: CBS
- Producer: Chris Kimsey

Noiseworks chronology
Noiseworks (1987)	Touch (1988)	Love versus Money (1991)

Singles from Touch
- 1. "Touch" Released: 24 October 1988; 2. "Voice of Reason" Released: 23 January 1989; 3. "Simple Man" Released: 1 May 1989; 4. "In My Youth" Released: 14 August 1989

Professional ratings
Review scores
Source	Rating
AllMusic	3/5 stars

Touch is the second studio album by Australian rock band Noiseworks. It was released by CBS Records on 14 November 1988.

The album debuted at No. 5 on the Australian Recording Industry Association (ARIA) Albums Chart. The album was produced by Chris Kimsey (The Rolling Stones) and Noiseworks. The title track preceded it as the first single, peaking at No. 12 on the ARIA Singles Chart. Subsequent singles "Voice of Reason", "Simple Man" and "In My Youth" failed to make the Top 40 (despite the latter receiving considerable radio airplay). Nevertheless, Noiseworks became at the time one of Australia's most popular live rock acts.

== Track listing ==
No.	Title	Writer(s)	Length
1.	"Simple Man"	Kevin Nicol, Steve Balbi, Stuart Fraser, Jon Stevens, Justin Stanley	3:48
2.	"Touch"	Kevin Nicol, Steve Balbi, Stuart Fraser, Jon Stevens, Justin Stanley	5:04
3.	"Voice of Reason"	Jon Stevens, Stuart Fraser	4:16
4.	"Chained"	Steve Balbi, Stuart Fraser, Kevin Nicol, Jon Stevens, Justin Stanley	4:26
5.	"Home"	Kevin Nicol, Steve Balbi, Stuart Fraser, Jon Stevens, Justin Stanley	5:15
6.	"I Can't Win"	Lester Johnson, Clifton Knight, Dave Richardson	2:55
7.	"Letter"	Kevin Nicol, Steve Balbi, Stuart Fraser, Jon Stevens, Justin Stanley	5:32
8.	"Tell It Like It Is"	Steve Balbi, Stuart Fraser, Kevin Nicol, Jon Stevens, Justin Stanley	4:22
9.	"Keep Me Running"	Steve Balbi, Stuart Fraser, Kevin Nicol, Jon Stevens, Justin Stanley	4:50
10.	"Live and Die"	Steve Balbi, Stuart Fraser, Kevin Nicol, Jon Stevens, Justin Stanley	4:35
11.	"In My Youth"	Jon Stephens, Justin Stanley	3:36

== Personnel ==
- Steve Balbi – bass, vocals
- Kevin Nicol – drums
- Stuart Fraser – guitar, vocals
- Justin Stanley – keyboards, harp, vocals
- Jon Stevens – vocals

Production

- Chris Kimsey – producer
- David Price – engineer

== Charts ==
=== Weekly charts ===
Chart (1988–89)	Peak position
Australian Albums (ARIA)	5
New Zealand Albums (RMNZ)	31
Swiss Albums (Schweizer Hitparade)	20
Swedish Albums (Sverigetopplistan)	24

=== Year-end charts ===
Chart (1989)	Position
ARIA Albums Chart	64

== Certifications ==
Region	Certification	Certified units/sales
Australia (ARIA)	Platinum	70,000^{^}
^{^} Shipments figures based on certification alone.
