= Simple Man (Noiseworks song) =

- Australian 7" single

Single by Noiseworks

from the album Touch
- B-side: "Letter"
- Released: 1 May 1989
- Recorded: July 1988
- Studio: Rhinoceros Studios
- Genre: Rock
- Length: 4:16
- Label: CBS
- Songwriters: Stuart Fraser; Jon Stevens
- Producer: Chris Kimsey

Noiseworks singles chronology
"Voice of Reason" (1989)	"Simple Man" (1989)	"In My Youth" (1989)

"Simple Man" is a song by Australian rock-pop band Noiseworks. It was released in May 1989 as the third single from their second studio album Touch (1988) and peaked at number 47 on the ARIA singles chart.

== Track listing ==
7" vinyl / CD single (654845 7)

No.	Title	Writer(s)	Length
1.	"Simple Man"	Jon Stevens, Stuart Fraser	4:16
2.	"Letter"	Kevin Nicol, Steve Balbi, Fraser, Stevens, Justin Stanley	5:32

12" vinyl / European CD maxi (654845 8)

No.	Title	Writer(s)	Length
1.	"Simple Man"	Stevens, Fraser	4:16
2.	"Letter"	Kevin Nicol, Steve Balbi, Fraser, Stevens, Justin Stanley	5:32
3.	"No Lies"	Brent Thomas, Stevens	3:48
4.	"Love Somebody"	Fraser, Stevens	4:19

== Charts ==
Chart (1989)	Peak position
Australia (ARIA)	47
