= Welcome to the World (Noiseworks song) =

Song by Australian rock-pop band

- Australian 7" Single

Single by Noiseworks

from the album Noiseworks
- B-side: "No Lies"
- Released: 16 November 1987
- Recorded: February 1987
- Studio: Rhinoceros Studios
- Genre: Rock
- Length: 5:08
- Label: CBS
- Songwriter(s): Jon Stevens; Stuart Fraser; Justin Stanley; Steve Balbi; Kevin Nicol
- Producer(s): Mark Opitz

Noiseworks singles chronology
"Love Someboy" (1987)	"Welcome to the World" (1987)	"Burning Feeling" (1988)

"Welcome to the World" is a song by Australian rock-pop band Noiseworks. It was released in November 1987 as the fourth single from their first studio album Noiseworks (1987) and peaked at number 41 on the Australian singles chart in January 1988. It was also released as a CD single, which was rather unique for an Australian band at the time.

== Track listing ==
7" (651016 7)

No.	Title	Writer(s)	Length
1.	"Welcome to the World"	Jon Stevens, Stuart Fraser, Justin Stanley, Steve Balbi, Kevin Nicol
2.	"No Lies" (live)	Brent Thomas, Stevens

- Live tracks recorded on 3 June 1987 at Selina's Sydney

== Charts ==
Chart (1988)	Peak position
Australia (Kent Music Report)	41
