= I Get Up =

2003 single by INXS

Single by INXS
- Released: 10 November 2003
- Length: 3:30
- Label: Mercury
- Songwriters: Andrew Farriss; Jon Stevens
- Producers: Andrew Farriss; Jon Stevens

INXS singles chronology
"One of My Kind" (2003)	"I Get Up" (2003)	"Mystify" (remix) (2004)

"I Get Up" is a song by Australian rock band INXS, released as a non-album single on 10 November 2003. The song was written by Andrew Farriss and Jon Stevens, and was the first new material by INXS since their former frontman, Michael Hutchence, committed suicide on 22 November 1997. Former Noiseworks lead singer Stevens had recently joined the band as lead singer, and the song is the only studio material recorded by INXS with Stevens on vocals. Stevens resigned from INXS by the end of 2003 because of "differing views" about the band's future.

== Track listing ==
Australian CD single

1. "I Get Up" – 3:30
2. "I Get Up" (Rogue Traders radio edit) – 3:30
3. "I Get Up" (Rogue Traders full version) – 6:40

== Charts ==
Chart (2003)	Peak position
Australia (ARIA)	72
