= Don't Let Love Go =

Single by Sharon O'Neill and Jon Stevens

from the album Jezebel
- A-side: "Don't Let Love Go"
- B-side: "Wages of Love"
- Released: February 1980
- Recorded: Marmalade Studios, Wellington, New Zealand
- Genre: Pop rock
- Length: 4:02
- Label: CBS Records
- Songwriter(s): Brenda Russell, Brian Russell
- Producer(s): Jay Lewis

Sharon O'Neill singles chronology
"Baby Don't Fight" (1979)	"Don't Let Love Go" (1980)	"Asian Paradise" (1980)

Jon Stevens singles chronology
"Montego Bay" (1980)	"Don't Let Love Go" (1980)	"Loving You (Is a Way of Life)" (1980)

"Don't Let Love Go" is a song recorded by New Zealand singer-songwriters, Sharon O'Neill and Jon Stevens. The song was produced by Jay Lewis. It was released in New Zealand as a single in February 1980 and peaked at number 5 in New Zealand in March 1980. The song was included on Stevens' debut solo album, Jezebel (1980).

== Track listing ==
Vinyl, 7", 45 RPM

1. "Don't Let Love Go" - 4:02
2. "Wages of Love" (Rob Winch) performed by Jon Stevens

== Charts ==
Chart (1980)	Peak position
New Zealand Singles Chart	5
