= Going Down (Jon Stevens song) =

Single by Jon Stevens

from the album Are U Satisfied
- B-side: "Midnight Train"
- Released: September 1993
- Genre: Pop rock
- Length: 3:01
- Label: Columbia, Sony Music Australia
- Songwriter(s): Jon Stevens; Stuart Fraser; R. Pleasance
- Producer(s): Jon Stevens; Stuart Fraser

Jon Stevens singles chronology
"Superstar" (1992)	"Going Down" (1993)	"Reflections" (1994)

"Going Down" is a song recorded by New Zealand singer-songwriter, Jon Stevens. The song was written by Jon Stevens, Stuart Fraser and R. Pleasance and was the first single taken from Stevens' third solo studio album, Are U Satisfied (1993). The single was released in September 1993 and is Stevens' first original recording since "Lover My Love "/"Running Away" in 1982.

== Track listing ==
CD single (Columbia 659645-1)

1. "Going Down" – 3:01
2. "Midnight Train" – 4:00

== Charts ==
Chart performance for "Going Down"
Chart (1993)	Peak position
Australia (ARIA)	39
