= Jon Stevens (album) =

Studio album by Jon Stevens
- Released: 1982
- Recorded: Studio 55, Los Angeles (1981)
- Genre: Pop music, Rock music
- Label: Big Time Records, CBS
- Producer: Trevor Lawrence

Jon Stevens chronology
Jezebel (1980)	Jon Stevens (1982)	Jesus Christ Superstar (1992)

Singles from Jon Stevens
- 1. "Running Away" Released: 1982; 2. "Lover My Love" Released: 1982

Jon Stevens is the second studio album by New Zealand born, Australian musician, Jon Stevens. It was released in 1982. it includes a cover of the Motown track, "Every Little Bit Hurts".

== Background and content ==
Following the success of Stevens' debut album, Jezebel, he relocated to Australia and became an Australian citizen. He signed a record deal with Australian label Big Time Records. Stevens then travelled to Los Angeles where the album was recorded with American session players. The album yielded two singles, neither of which were successful.

Following this, Stevens formed a band called The Change that would go on to become Noiseworks in 1986.

== Track listing ==
Vinyl, cassette (BT 7003) / (SBP237766)

- A1 "Lover My Love" (Stevens, Barry, Lawrence) - 4:18
- A2 "Stringin' a Line" (Thomas) - 4:35
- A3 "(The One That You Love Is) Here To Stay" (Stevens, Lawrence) - 3:57
- A4 "How Much Love" (Stevens, Parker) - 3:27
- A5 "Make You Mine, All Mine" (Stevens, Lawrence) - 3:50
- B1 "Running Away" (Smith) - 3:10
- B2 "Don't You Give Up" (Stevens, Lawrence) - 3:29
- B3 "Every Little Bit Hurts" (Ed Cobb) - 5:14
- B4 "Come Back" (Stevens, Lawrence) - 3:36
- B5 "Crimes of Passion" (McCuskier, Wilson) - 4:33
