= Love Versus Money (Noiseworks album) =

Love versus Money

Studio album by Noiseworks
- Released: 1 July 1991
- Recorded: 1989–1991
- Genre: Pub rock
- Label: Sony
- Producer: Randy Jackson

Noiseworks chronology
Touch (1988)	Love versus Money (1991)	Greatest Hits (1992)

Singles from Love versus Money
- 1. "Freedom" Released: 14 May 1990; 2. "Miles & Miles" Released: 22 October 1990; 3. "Hot Chilli Woman" Released: 17 June 1991; 4. "R.I.P. (Millie)" Released: 2 September 1991; 5. "Take You Higher" Released: 10 February 1992

Love versus Money is the third studio album by Australian rock band Noiseworks. It contained the Top 10 hit "Hot Chilli Woman". It peaked at number 1 on the ARIA Chart.

Amongst the well-known names that contributed to the album were Snap! singer Penny Ford, Vika Bull and Michael Hutchence of INXS. The album also contained a tribute to frontman Jon Stevens's late mother who had died from cancer, the song was titled "R.I.P. (Millie)".

This was the final studio album for phase one of Noiseworks as they disbanded shortly afterwards. However, in December 2007, lead singer Jon Stevens announced that Noiseworks, who had reformed earlier that year (minus keyboardist Justin Stanley), were returning to the studio in 2008 to record their first album together in sixteen years.

== Track listing ==
No.	Title	Writer(s)	Length
1.	"Jealousy (Is a Curse)"	Jon Stevens, Steve Balbi, Justin Stanley	3:49
2.	"Hot Chilli Woman"	Balbi, Stanley	3:24
3.	"Liberty Bell"	Kevin Nicol, Balbi, Stuart Fraser, Stevens, Stanley	3:55
4.	"R.I.P. (Millie)"	Nicol, Balbi, Fraser, Stevens, Stanley	4:35
5.	"Take You Higher"	Sly Stone	3:36
6.	"Day Will Come"	Nicol, Balbi, Fraser, Stevens, Stanley	3:46
7.	"Miles & Miles"	Balbi, Fraser, Stevens, Stanley	4:16
8.	"Don't Lead Me On"	Balbi, Nicol, Stanley	4:46
9.	"Everyday People"	Balbi, Fraser, Stevens, Stanley	4:05
10.	"Burning Cross"	Nicol, Balbi, Fraser, Stevens, Stanley	3:55
11.	"Love versus Money"	Nicol, Balbi, Fraser, Stevens, Stanley	3:43
12.	"Freedom"	Balbi, Fraser, Stanley, Stevens	3:17

== Personnel ==
- Steve Balbi – bass, vocals
- Kevin Nicol – drums
- Stuart Fraser – guitar, vocals
- Justin Stanley – keyboards, vocals
- Jon Stevens – lead vocals

== Additional ==
- Penny Ford – backing vocals ("Jealousy (Is a Curse)")
- Shauna Jensen – backing vocals ("Liberty Bell")
- Dorian Holley, Niki Haris, Rodney Saulsberry, Yvone Williams, Alex Brown, Bridgette Bryant, Fred White and Darryl Phinnessee – gospel choir ("R.I.P. (Millie)", "Day Will Come")
- Michael Hutchence – vocals ("Take You Higher")
- Vika Bull – vocals ("Take You Higher")
- Randy Jackson – producer

== Charts ==
Chart (1991)	Peak position
Australian Albums (ARIA)	1

== Certifications ==
Region	Certification	Certified units/sales
Australia (ARIA)	Platinum	70,000^{^}
^{^} Shipments figures based on certification alone.
