= Lucky Charm (album) =

Studio album by The Black Sorrows
- Released: 4 November 1994
- Genre: Blues; rock; Folk rock; pop rock; country rock
- Label: Columbia
- Producer: Joe Camilleri, Kerryn Tolhurst

The Black Sorrows chronology
The Chosen Ones – Greatest Hits (1993)	Lucky Charm (1994)	Radio Waves (1996)

Singles from Lucky Charm
- 1. "Snake Skin Shoes" Released: July 1994; 2. "Last One Standing for You" Released: 24 October 1994; 3. "Lucky Charm" Released: February 1995

Lucky Charm is the eighth studio album by Australian rock act The Black Sorrows. Previously a band with a set line-up, for this album lead singer Joe Camilleri was the only constant from track to track, as he worked with 42 other musicians on the album.

Lucky Charm was released on 4 November 1994. The album debuted and peaked at number 20 on the ARIA Charts, becoming the band's fifth consecutive top twenty album.

== Track listing ==
CD track listing (478280 2)

No.	Title	Writer(s)	Producer(s)	Length
1.	"Lucky Charm"	Joe Camilleri; Nick Smith	Joe Camilleri; Kerryn Tolhurst	4:57
2.	"Biggest Show in Town"	Camilleri; Smith	Camilleri; Tolhurst	4:51
3.	"Snake Skin Shoes"	Camilleri; Jeff Griffin	Camilleri; Tolhurst	4:44
4.	"Last One Standing For You" (with Jon Stevens)	Camilleri; Griffin; Laurie Polec	Camilleri	4:14
5.	"Down to the Sea"	Camilleri; Smith	Camilleri	3:55
6.	"Don't Judge Me Too Hard"	Camilleri; Smith	Camilleri; Tolhurst	4:39
7.	"Radio Was King"	Camilleri; Smith	Camilleri; Tolhurst	4:02
8.	"Sacred Thing"	Camilleri; Smith	Camilleri; Tolhurst	4:42
9.	"Mystery Ship"	Camilleri; Smith	Camilleri	4:27
10.	"I'm a Stranger"	Camilleri; Griffin	Camilleri; Tolhurst	4:33
11.	"Kiss From a Cage"	Camilleri; Polec	Camilleri; Tolhurst	5:11
12.	"Time to Burn"	Camilleri; Smith	Camilleri; Tolhurst	4:40
13.	"Bone Man"	Camilleri; Smith	Camilleri	3:20
14.	"When it All Comes Down"	Camilleri; Smith	Camilleri	3:55
15.	"Life's Sad Parade"	Camilleri; Smith	Camilleri	3:24

Additional track on US/European releases

No.	Title	Writer(s)	Producer(s)	Length
16.	"Stir It Up"	Bob Marley	Camilleri	3:35

== Weekly charts ==
Chart (1994)	Peak position
Australian Albums (ARIA)	20

== Personnel ==
- Joe Camilleri – vocals, guitars (1,5,9,13,14), saxophone (2,4), accordion (7), vibes (9)

with:

- Kerryn Tolhurst – guitars (1,2,3,10), banjo (3), tiple (4,6,7,8,10,12), mandolin (4,7,11) lap steel (12), Hawaiian guitar (8,11)
- Andy York – guitars (1,3,6,7,8,11)
- Claude Carranza – guitars (2,4,9,10,12), dobro (9)
- Stuart Fraser – guitar (4)
- Shane O'Mara – guitars (5,14), dobro (5)
- Phil Butson – guitar (6)
- John Scurry – banjo (15)
- James Black – keyboards (1)
- Bob Mayo – keyboards (1,3,7)
- Charlie Giordano – accordion (2,8,12), keyboards (2,4,10)
- Michael Allen – sound effects keyboard (3)
- John Margolis – keyboards (6,11)
- David Bates – piano (15)
- Robert Burke – flute and clarinet (5)
- Chris Taner – clarinet (15)
- Lenny Pickett – tenor saxophone (7)
- Crispin Cioe – baritone saxophone (12)
- Arno Hecht – tenor saxophone (12)
- Vinnie Cutro – trumpet (10)
- Eugene Ball – cornet (15)
- Todd Reynolds – violin (2)
- Eileen Ivers – fiddle (6,11)
- Susan Pirotti – strings (14)
- Rosanne Hunt – strings (14)
- Julia De Jonghe – strings (14)
- Karen Coulton – strings (14)
- Steven Hadley – bass (1,2,3,4,6,7,8,10,11,12)
- Joe Creighton – bass (9)
- Howard Cairns – double bass (15)
- Steve Ferrone – drums (1,2,3,4,6,7,8,10,11,12)
- John Watson – drums (9)
- Allan Browne – drums (15)
- Jon Stevens - co-lead vocal (4)
- Rebecca Barnard – backing vocals (1,5,14)
- Gordon Dukes – backing vocals (2)
- Ron Grant – backing vocals (2,4)
- Wayne Hernandez – backing vocals (2,4)
- Kenny Simpson – backing vocals (4)
- Nick Smith – backing vocals (6)
- Joey Diggs – backing vocals (7)
- Lamont Van Hook – backing vocals (7)
- Johnny Rosch – backing vocals (7)
