= Woman (Jon Stevens album) =

Studio album by Jon Stevens
- Released: 18 September 2015
- Recorded: Sydney, Australia
- Genre: Rock music
- Length: 38:09
- Label: Social Family Records
- Producers: Jon Stevens, Sam Iervasi

Jon Stevens chronology
Testify! (2011)	Woman (2015)	Starlight (2017)

Woman is the ninth studio album by Australian singer-songwriter, Jon Stevens. The album was released on 18 September 2015 and peaked at number 86.

The first single "Woman" was available as a free download for two weeks from Stevens' Facebook page.

== Background and content ==
In February 2015, Stevens was arrested after calling police to intervene in a domestic dispute between himself and clothing designer and girlfriend Jodhi Meares. He was released on bail after pledging not to “assault, molest, harass or interfere with Jodhi Meares.” The charges were dropped in May 2015. Stevens said he endured some of the darkest days of his life in the three months before the assault charges were dropped, knowing he was innocent, saying, “I do not condone violence of any kind. Who in their right mind does?”. In April, he was also thrown out of band The Dead Daisies, which he'd co-formed in 2012.

Following this, Stevens said he dealt with depression and spent a lot of time in the studio “I always turn to music; it's the saviour. A lot of people go through what I went through, maybe not to the degree I did with all the media crap which was just wrong, completely wrong. It damaged me, I suppose. I haven't gotten over it. If it wasn't for music ... who knows?”

The title track pays tribute to the love he shared with Meares while others offer a cathartic release for the darkness and confusion which clouded his life. He also includes songs about his time with The Dead Daisies, while "Flesh 'N' Bone" was inspired by the 2014 Lindt Cafe siege.

== Reviews ==
Rod Yates of Rolling Stone Australia gave the album 3 out of 4 saying; "[Stevens] first solo album in four years... lands somewhere between Foo Fighters-esque pop-rock and sweeping, bluesy riff-fests. It works, to a point, largely because of Stevens' formidable vocals, but pub rock moments like "Peaches N Pie" are too throwaway. The string-laden "In Your House", however, complete with hip-hop interlude courtesy of Stevens' son Levi, is a stand-out that suggests he's at his best when taking risks."

== Track listing ==
CD/download

1. "Woman" - 3:50
2. "Catch You Falling" - 4:03
3. "Passing By" - 3:26
4. "Outer Space" - 4:08
5. "In Your House" - 3:53
6. "Flesh 'n' Bone" - 3:25
7. "The Chronic Symphonic" - 4:07
8. "Peaches 'n' Pie" - 3:34
9. "Supabad" - 3:37
10. "Save What Is Left of Me" - 4:06

== Charts ==
Woman debuted and peaked at number 86 on the ARIA chart, becoming Stevens' second solo album to chart in the top 100 after Are U Satisfied in 1993.

Chart (2015)	Peak position
Australian Albums (ARIA Charts)	86

== Release history ==
Region	Date	Format	Label	Catalogue
Australia	18 September 2015	CD; digital download	Liberation Music	JS0001
