= Starlight (Jon Stevens album) =

Studio album by Jon Stevens
- Released: 31 March 2017
- Recorded: Los Angeles, Nashville
- Genre: Rock
- Length: 38:17
- Label: Liberation Records
- Producer: David A. Stewart

Jon Stevens chronology
Woman (2015)	Starlight (2017)

Singles from Starlight
- 1. "Hold On" Released: 13 February 2017; 2. "Feel Like Letting Go" Released: 7 July 2017

Starlight is the tenth studio album by Australian singer-songwriter Jon Stevens. The album was released on 31 March 2017. The album debuted at number 16, becoming Stevens' highest-charting album in Australia. Stevens toured the album across July and August 2017, with special guest Kate Ceberano.

== Background and content ==
In 2016, Stevens worked with David A. Stewart of the Eurythmics, who co-wrote and produced the album.

On 13 February 2017, Stevens announced the release of the album along with the lead single "Hold On".

Released concurrently with the album was an official documentary about its production, Starlight the Documentary.

He was backed by former Beatles drummer Ringo Starr on the Track "One Way Street"

== Reception ==
Jessie Cunneffe of Rolling Stone gave the album 3 out of 4 stars, saying; "If you're looking for a pub gig in an album, Jon Stevens has delivered. That said, it's the sort of gig you're likely to talk over some of the time – a solid backdrop of classic soul, blues, country and rock that amps up the atmosphere without monopolising your attentions. The skilfully delivered consistency is oddly wearisome at times though. While Starlight is polished and rocking, it's rather predictable".

== Track listing ==
1. "Hold On" – 2:23
2. "Oh Lord" – 2:51
3. "Feel Like Letting Go" – 4:28
4. "Scars" – 3:38
5. "F.U.C." – 3:35
6. "Devil in My Heart" – 3:05
7. "Something 'Bout You" (featuring Vanessa Amorosi) – 3:05
8. "One Way Street" (featuring Ringo Starr) – 3:13
9. "What Makes You Happy" – 2:58
10. "Starlight" – 4:32
11. "All About the People" – 4:29

== Charts ==
Chart (2017)	Peak position
Australian Albums (ARIA)	16

== Release history ==
Region	Date	Format	Label	Catalogue
Australia	31 March 2017	CD; digital download	Liberation Music	LIB203CD
