= Burning Feeling =

- Australian 7" single

Single by Noiseworks

from the album Noiseworks
- B-side: "River of Tears"
- Released: 14 March 1988
- Recorded: February 1987
- Studio: Rhinoceros Studios
- Genre: Rock
- Length: 3:56
- Label: CBS
- Songwriters: Jon Stevens; Stuart Fraser
- Producer: Mark Opitz

Noiseworks singles chronology
"Welcome to the World" (1987)	"Burning Feeling" (1988)	"Touch" (1988)

"Burning Feeling" is a song by Australian rock-pop band Noiseworks. It was released in March 1988 as the fifth and final single from their first studio album, Noiseworks (1987) and peaked at number 60 on the Australian Kent Music Report.

== Track listing ==
7" (65147476)

No.	Title	Writer(s)	Length
1.	"Burning Feeling"	Jon Stevens, Stuart Fraser	3:56
2.	"River of Tears" (live)	Stevens, Fraser, Justin Stanley

- Track 2 recorded on 3 June 1987 at Selina's Sydney

== Charts ==
Chart (1988)	Peak position
Australia (Kent Music Report)	60
