= Testify! (album) =

Studio album by Jon Stevens
- Released: 11 November 2011
- Recorded: Los Angeles, United States
- Genres: Rock music, Soul music
- Label: Universal Music Australia
- Producers: Jon Stevens, John Fields

Jon Stevens chronology
Changing Times (2011)	Testify! (2011)	Woman (2015)

Singles from Testify!
- 1. "(I Wanna) Testify" Released: October 2011

Testify! is the eighth studio album by the New Zealand singer-songwriter Jon Stevens. The album was released on 11 November 2011 and is a collection of soul covers and originals.

== Background and content ==
Stevens was raised in a small town in New Zealand, the youngest of 11 children of a music loving family. He said one of his earliest musical memories "was his mother Millie playing Mahalia Jackson, Staple Singers and other gospel 78s on the family stereo". Stevens said he grew up listening to Blues music, artists that influenced him include: Sam Cooke, Ray Charles, Otis Redding, James Brown, Etta James, Little Richard, Donny Hathaway, Stevie Wonder, Rod Stewart, Tom Jones, The Rolling Stones, The Beatles, and The Kinks. He sees Testify! as "a culmination of the many and varied musical influences that have been with him since his childhood".

== Reviews ==
Ian Cutherbertson of The Australian gave the album 3 1/2 out of 5 praising Stevens' natural talent, but thought the album wouldn't be a 'hit'. He thought the best of the original songs was "Be Like Me""

Jamie Horne from The Border Mail believed Stevens' voice suited this style and said Sam Cooke’s aching "A Change Is Gonna Come" "is a true album highlight." In a word, Horne said the album was "authentic".

== Track listing ==
CD/download

1. "(I Wanna) Testify" (George Clinton, Deron Taylor) - 3:23
2. "Private Number" (William Bell, Booker T. Jones) (featuring Vanessa Amorosi) - 3:02
3. "A Change is Gonna Come" (Sam Cooke) - 3:09
4. "All Or Nothing" (Jon Stevens) - 2:57
5. "That's How Strong My Love Is" (O. V. Wright) - 2:58
6. "Fire" (Etta James) - 2:25
7. "I Can't Stand Up for Falling Down" (Homer Banks, Allen Jones) - 2:53
8. "Freedom" (Jimi Hendrix) - 3:05
9. "Open to Ideas" (Faces) - 3:11
10. "You Can’t Do Anything To Hurt Me" (Jon Stevens/Vanessa Amorosi/John Fields) - 4:05
11. "Be Like Me" (Jon Stevens/Vanessa Amorosi/John Fields) -3:19

== Charts ==
Chart (2011)	Peak position
Australian Albums (ARIA Charts)	115

== Release history ==
Region	Date	Format	Label	Catalogue
Australia	11 November 2011	CD; digital download	Universal Music Australia	2787035
