= Changing Times (Jon Stevens album) =

Studio album by Jon Stevens
- Released: 9 September 2011
- Genre: Rock music, Soul music, R&B
- Label: Circle Music, Universal Music Australia

Jon Stevens chronology
The Works (2005)	Changing Times (2011)	Testify! (2011)

Singles from Changing Times
- 1. "Just a Man" Released: August 2011

Changing Times is the seventh studio album by Australian singer-songwriter, Jon Stevens. The album was released digitally only on 9 September 2011. It was later released on CD as part of a deluxe version of the Testify! album.

The album was announced via a press release on 22 August 2011, where Stevens announced he'd signed with Universal Music Australia. In a statement, he said; "I am very excited to have signed with Universal music & commencing work on promoting the release of my new album Changing Times. This is sure to be a great end to the year and the start of a great future ahead!"

Stevens promoted the album with a national tour throughout October 2011.

== Track listing ==
Digital Download

1. "One Mistake" - 3:51
2. "Acid Tongue" - 3:23
3. "Living The Life" - 4:07
4. "Maybe Baby" - 3:32
5. "Just a Man" - 3:48
6. "These Are the Days" - 3:32
7. "Stare" - 3:36
8. "Kamikaze Pilot" - 3:39
9. "No Surrender" - 3:13
10. "Closer to God" - 3:41
11. "Changing Times" - 2:42

== Release history ==
Region	Date	Format	Label
Australia	9 September 2011	digital download	Circle Music, Universal Music Australia
