= In My Youth =

- Australian 7" single

Single by Noiseworks

from the album Touch
- B-side: "I Can't Win"
- Released: 14 August 1989
- Recorded: Rhinoceros Studios; July 1988
- Genre: rock
- Length: 3:32
- Label: CBS
- Songwriters: Jon Stevens; Justin Stanley
- Producer: Chris Kimsey

Noiseworks singles chronology
"Simple Man" (1989)	"In My Youth" (1989)	"Freedom" (1990)

"In My Youth" is a song by Australian rock-pop band Noiseworks. It was released in August 1989 as the fourth and final single from their second studio album Touch (1988) and peaked at number 44 on the ARIA singles chart.

== Track listing ==
7" vinyl / CD single (655107 7)

No.	Title	Writer(s)	Length
1.	"In My Youth"	Jon Stevens, Justin Stanley	3:32
2.	"I Can't Win" (live)	Dave Richardson, Lester Johnson, Clifton Knight

== Charts ==
Chart (1989)	Peak position
Australia (ARIA)	44
