= Are U Satisfied =

Studio album by Jon Stevens
- Released: October 1993
- Studio: Damien Gerard Studios
- Genre: Arena rock, rock
- Label: Columbia Records
- Producer: Jon Stevens, Stuart Fraser

Jon Stevens chronology
Jesus Christ Superstar (1992)	Are U Satisfied (1993)	Circle (1996)

Singles from Are U Satisfied
- 1. "Going Down" Released: September 1993; 2. "Reflections" Released: 1994

Are U Satisfied is the third studio album by New Zealand-born Australian musician Jon Stevens, released in October 1993. It was preceded by the lead single "Going Down", which peaked at number 39 on the ARIA singles chart. The album is described by Music Theatre Australia as having "an infectious raw rock spirit."

It was the first solo album in eleven years, in which time Stevens had been the lead singer of Noiseworks (1986-1992) and played the role of Judas in the Australian production of Jesus Christ Superstar (1992). The album peaked at number 27 on the ARIA Charts.

== Critical reception ==
Darryl Mason from Rolling Stone wrote; "Produced by Stevens and Noiseworks' guitarist Stuart Fraser and recorded in just a few weeks with a bunch of good friends, Are U Satisfied could well have been cluttered and self-indulgent. But Jon Stevens understands Australia's rock-loving crowds and, on these levels, Are U Satisfied? does not disappoint. The record is thick with good, strong songs, mostly about love and relationships, but the music is almost stripped to its bare bones. It smells pleasantly of Seventies-retro — the kind that artists like Lenny Kravitz are now exploring — funky, riff-driven numbers with peaking swirls of keyboards and boppin' stomp rhythms. A number of the songs also sound so familiar that you'd swear they're obscure covers. One of the most pleasantly surprising aspects of Are U Satisfied is the lack of radio-friendly ballads. "Burn So Bright" is about the closest this album comes to a ballad, and even so, this song's quiet moments are impaled on hooking, gritty riffs. With Noiseworks and Jesus Christ Superstar fading in the distance, Are U Satisfied marks the beginning of a new phase in Jon Stevens's career, and while it is not overly experimental or innovative, it will satisfy those who dig their rock straight up, tight, honest and unpolished."

== Track listing ==
1. "Hard as Stone" (Jon Stevens, Jed Starr, Stuart Fraser) – 3:35
2. "Going Down" (Stevens, Richard Pleasance, Fraser) – 3:02
3. "Love Makes No Sense" (Stevens, Kevin Saviour) – 3:51
4. "All I Need Is You" (Stevens, Fraser) – 3:55
5. "Stay" (Stevens, Starr, Fraser) – 4:04
6. "Say What Ya Mean" (Stevens) – 3:54
7. "I'll Be There" (Stevens, Nick Barker, Fraser) – 3:20
8. "Change Your Mind" (Stevens, Barker) – 3:25
9. "Burn So Bright" (Stevens, Barker) – 4:15
10. "Reflections" (Stevens, Starr) – 4:28
11. "Are U Satisfied" (Stevens, Fraser, Tom DeLuca) – 4:11

== Personnel ==
- Stuart Fraser – bass, electric guitar
- Virgil Donati – drums
- Jed Starr – guitar
- Nick Barker – guitar, "wisecracks"
- Jon Stevens – vocals, acoustic guitar
- Paul Gray – Hammond organ, keyboards

== Charts ==
Chart performance for Are U Satisfied
Chart (1993)	Peak position
Australian Albums (ARIA)	27
