= Voice of Reason (song) =

- Australian 7" single

Single by Noiseworks

from the album Touch
- B-side: "Walk with Me"
- Released: 23 January 1989
- Recorded: July 1988
- Studio: Rhinoceros Studios
- Genre: Rock
- Length: 4:16
- Label: CBS
- Songwriters: Stuart Fraser; Jon Stevens
- Producer: Chris Kimsey

Noiseworks singles chronology
"Touch" (1988)	"Voice of Reason" (1989)	"Simple Man" (1989)

"Voice of Reason" is a song by Australian rock-pop band Noiseworks. It was released in January 1989 as the second single from their second studio album Touch (1988) and peaked at number 43 on the ARIA singles chart.

== Track listing ==
7" vinyl / CD single (654547 7)

No.	Title	Writer(s)	Length
1.	"Voice of Reason"	Jon Stevens, Stuart Fraser	4:16
2.	"Walk With Me"

== Charts ==
Chart (1989)	Peak position
Australia (ARIA)	43
