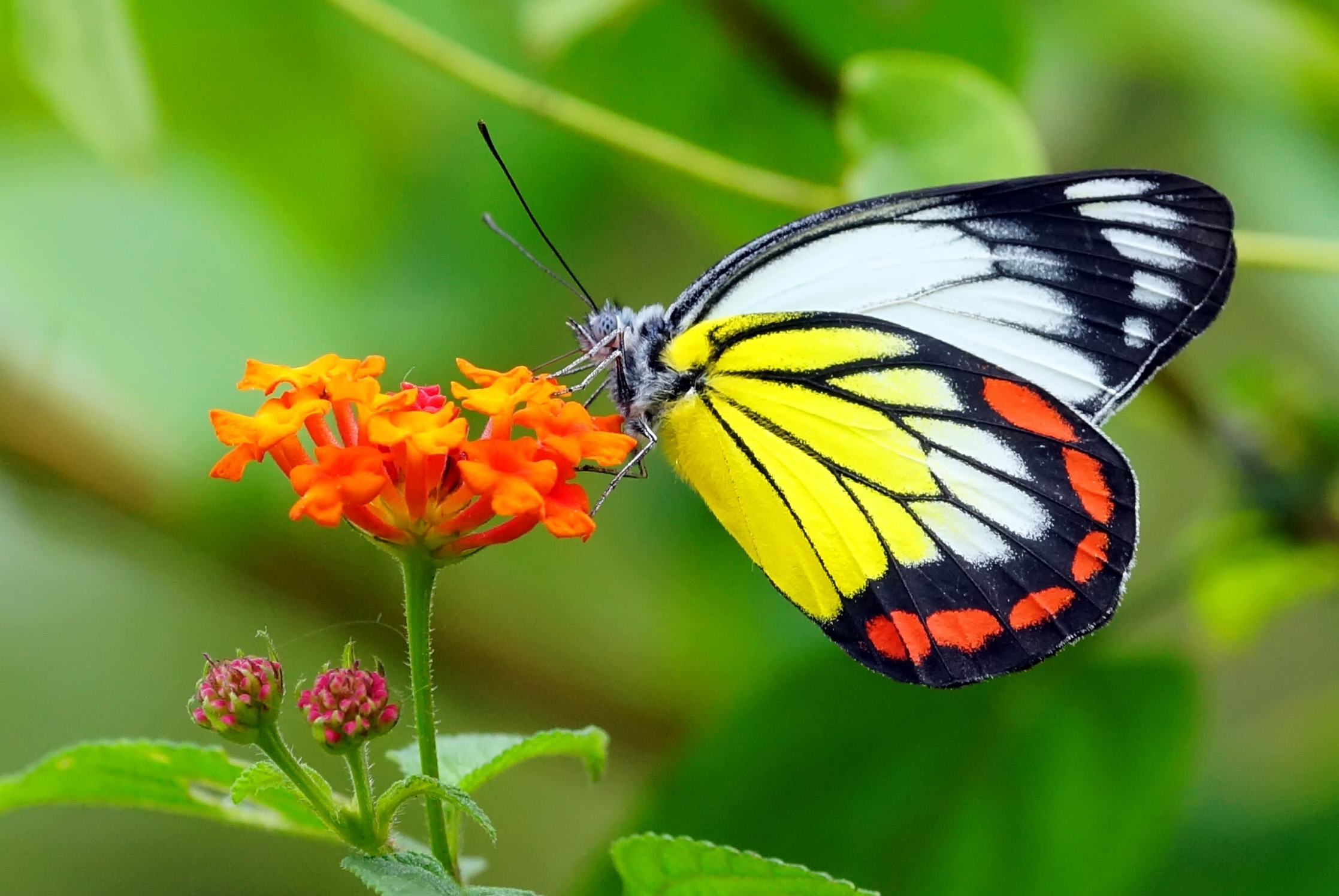
- Delias hyparete luzonensis
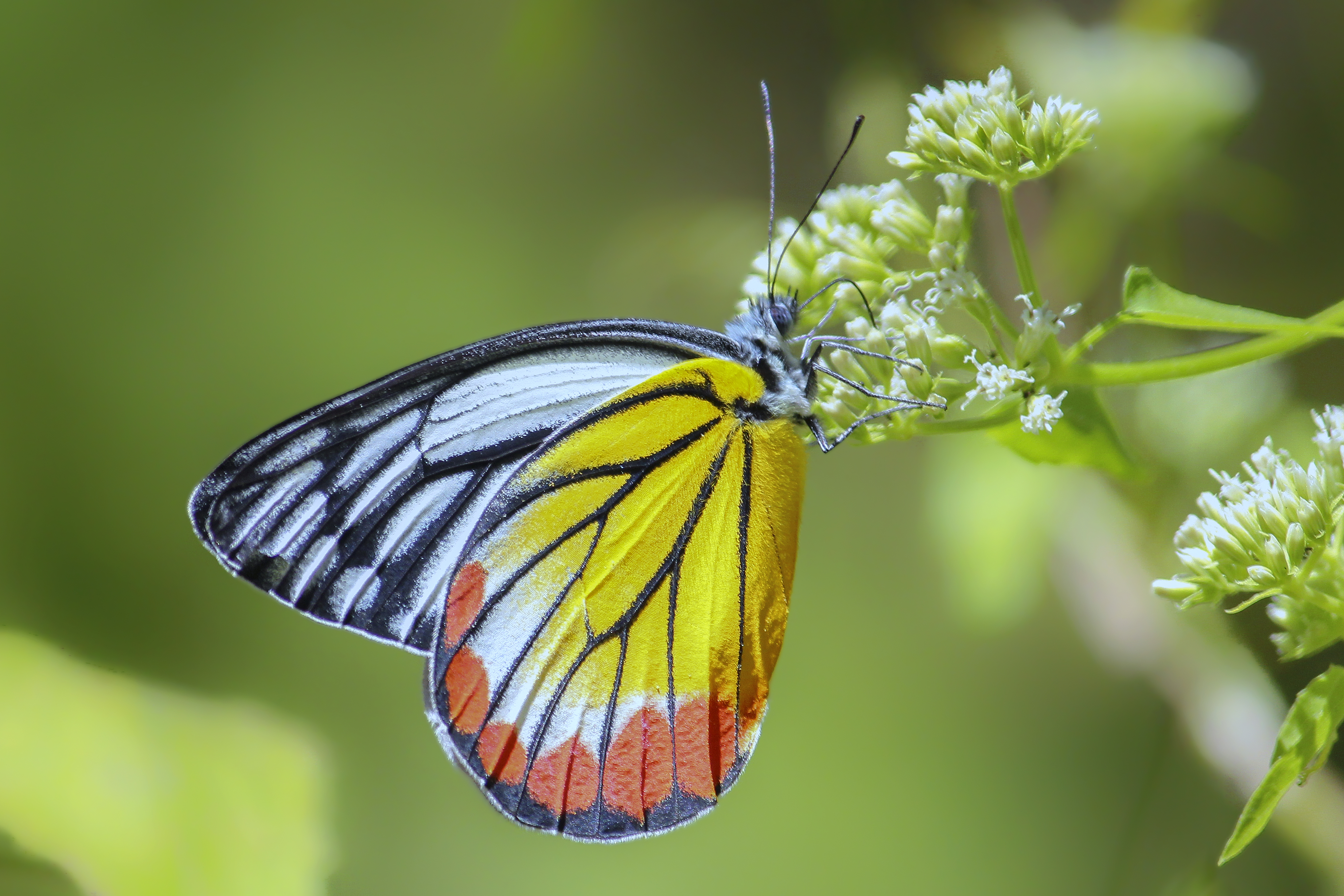
- Delias hyparete indica

Scientific classification
- Kingdom: Animalia
- Phylum: Arthropoda
- Clade: Pancrustacea
- Class: Insecta
- Order: Lepidoptera
- Family: Pieridae
- Genus: Delias
- Species: D. hyparete

Binomial name
- Delias hyparete (Linnaeus, 1758)

= Delias hyparete =

Painted Jezebel

Species of butterfly

Delias hyparete, the painted Jezebel, is a medium-sized butterfly of the family Pieridae, found in South Asia and Southeast Asia.

== Description ==
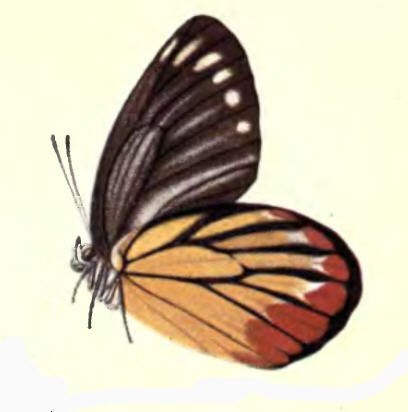
Delias hyparete hierta

This species closely resembles Delias eucharis but can be distinguished as follows: Male upper forewing has the black margins to the veins more diffuse; the transverse postdiscal band diffuse, ill-defined, oblique, not parallel to termen in its lower portion but terminated at apex of vein 2; the apical portion of the wing beyond the fascia more or less so thickly shaded with black scales as to leave the white lanceolate (lance-shaped) spaces between the veins (so prominent in D. eucharis) ill-defined and obscure. Hindwing white, the black venation and terminal narrow black border as well as the sub-terminal vermilion-red spots between the veins on the underside show through by transparency. Underside: forewing as in D. eucharis, but the black margins to the veins much broader and the postdiscal transverse fascia as on the upperside oblique but broader. Hindwing differs from that of D. eucharis in the much deeper chrome-yellow tint of the ground colour, the postdiscal black curved band that in D. eucharis separates the yellow from the subterminal vermilion-red spots entirely wanting, the red spots themselves pointed inwardly, not subcordate, they conspicuously increase in size posteriorly. Antennae, head, thorax and abdomen similar to those of D. eucharis. Female differs from the female of D. eucharis on the upperside by the very much darker shading, especially on the forewing, and by the postdiscal transverse band which is as in the D. eucharis oblique but broader. Hindwing also more darkly shaded, the postdiscal transverse curved black baud entirely absent. Underside as in the female but darker, the forewing especially more thickly shaded with black scaling, the preapical interspaces tinged with yellow. Antennae, thorax and abdomen similar to those in D. eucharis.

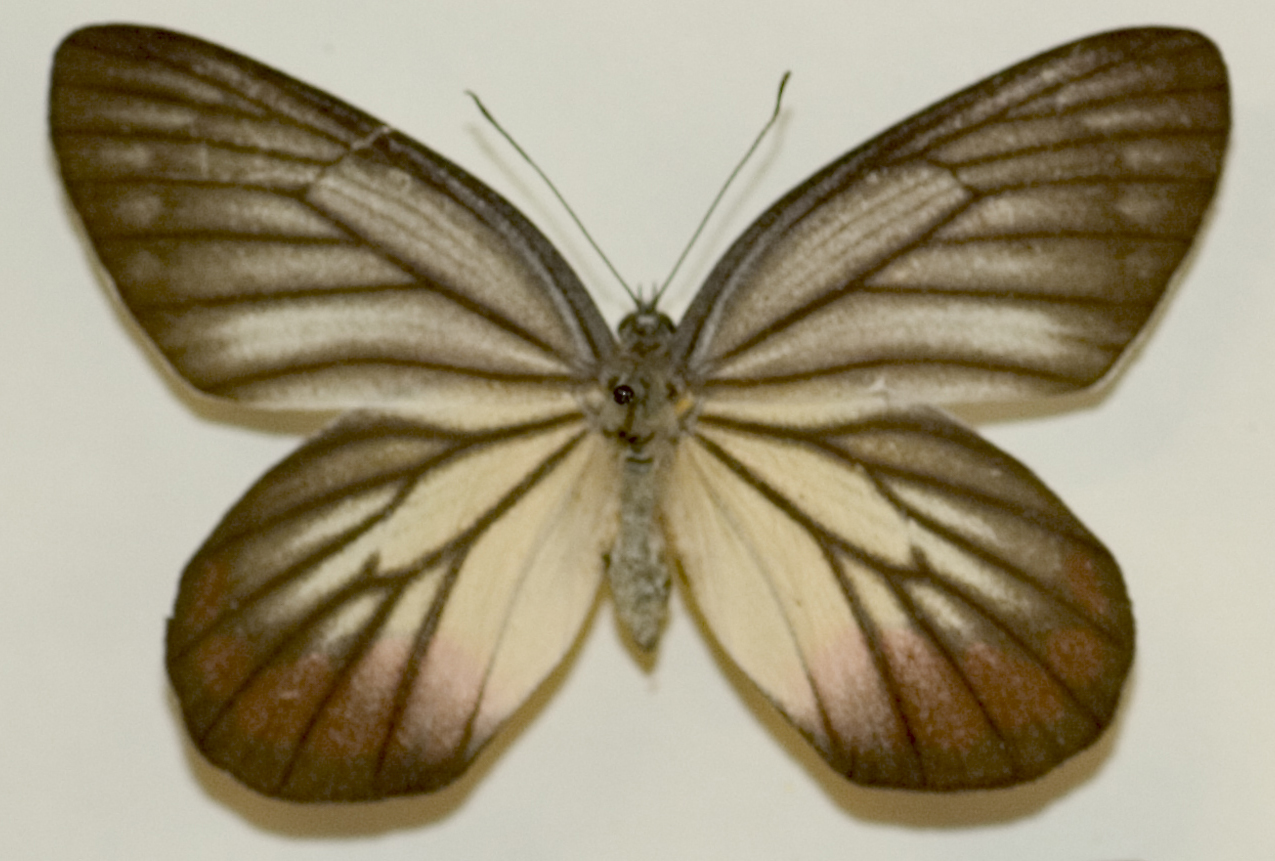
Delias hyparete metarete female, upperside

Subspecies D. h. metarete, Butler (Southern Myanmar; extending to Java and Sumatra) differs from D. h. hierta as follows: Male upperside has the ground colour a much purer white; apical half of forewing in contrast with the white on basal half densely shaded with black scales. Underside: the colours clearer and purer, the chrome yellow on the hindwing confined to the base and posterior half of the wing, the apical half of the cell and the anterior interspaces within the line of the vermilion-red spots pure white; the anterior two or three subterminal red spots margined interiorly with diffuse black scaling. Female differs less from the 2 of D. h. hierta, but on the underside of the hindwing the yellow colour is as restricted as it is in the male; the subterminal red spots are of a richer vermilion than in D. h. hierta, and the anterior two or three as in the d have an interior narrow margin of diffuse black scales. Antennae, head, thorax and abdomen as in D. h. hierta, but the thorax and abdomen shaded slightly darker with a bluish-grey appearance.

Subspecies D. h. ethire, Doherty (Madras; Orissa; Lower Bengal) differs from typical D. h. hierta as follows: Male upperside very pure white. Forewing has the black margins to the veins very narrow, the oblique postdiscal band ill-defined, scarcely any irroration of black scales on the apical half of the wing. Hindwing pure white, the colours of the underside seen through by transparency as in D. h. hierta. Underside differs from D. h. hierta principally in the brighter tint of the yellow on the hindwing, and in the more clearly defined, less diffuse black margins of the veins. Female differs less from female D. h. hierta than does the male from the corresponding sex of the same insect. Upperside has the interspaces beyond the postdiscal oblique band on forewing and the cell and basal halves of the interspaces beyond the cell on the hindwing distinctly tinged with yellow. Underside: all the markings more neatly and clearly defined than in D. h. hierta, the interspaces beyond the oblique postdiscal band on the forewing bright lemon-yellow. Antennae, head, thorax and abdomen in both sexes as in D. h. hierta.

The 2.5cm pupa has a short black ridge anteriorly and spike-like dorsal processes across most body segments and spike-like lateral black processes in the early abdominal segments. A few black streaks are located in the wing pad.

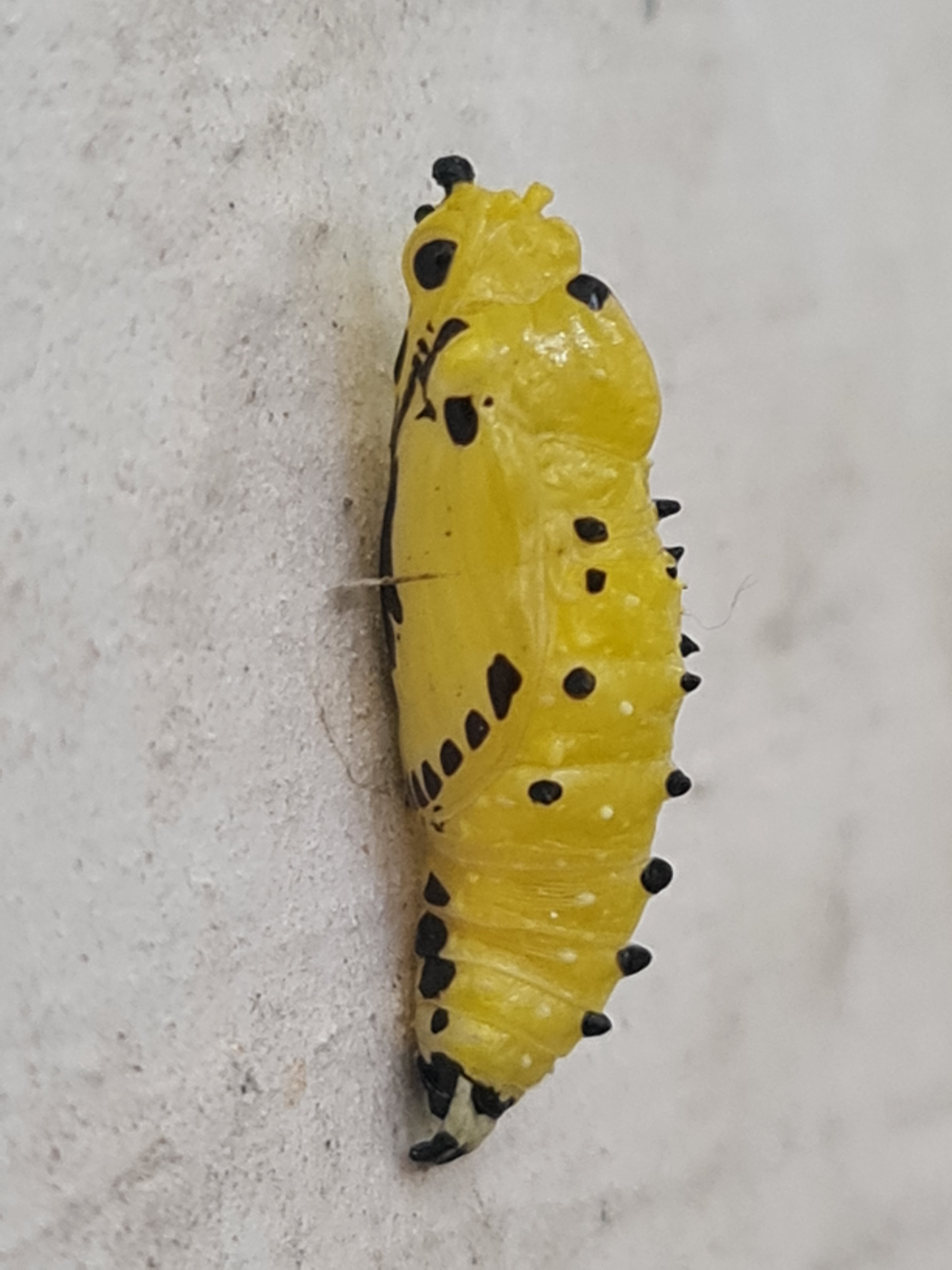
Pupa -Painted Jezebel - Delias hyparete

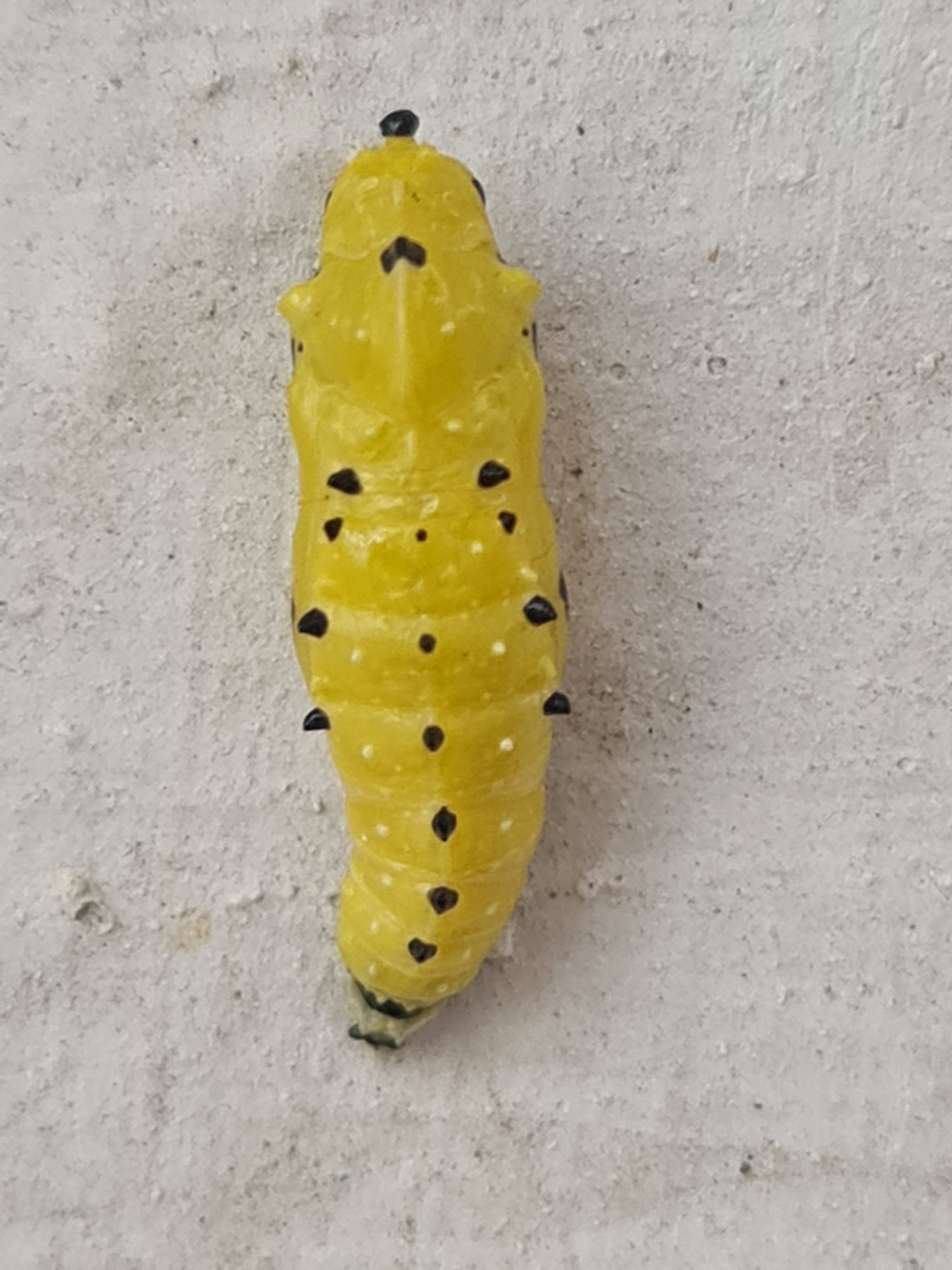
Pupa of Painted Jezebel - Delias hyparete

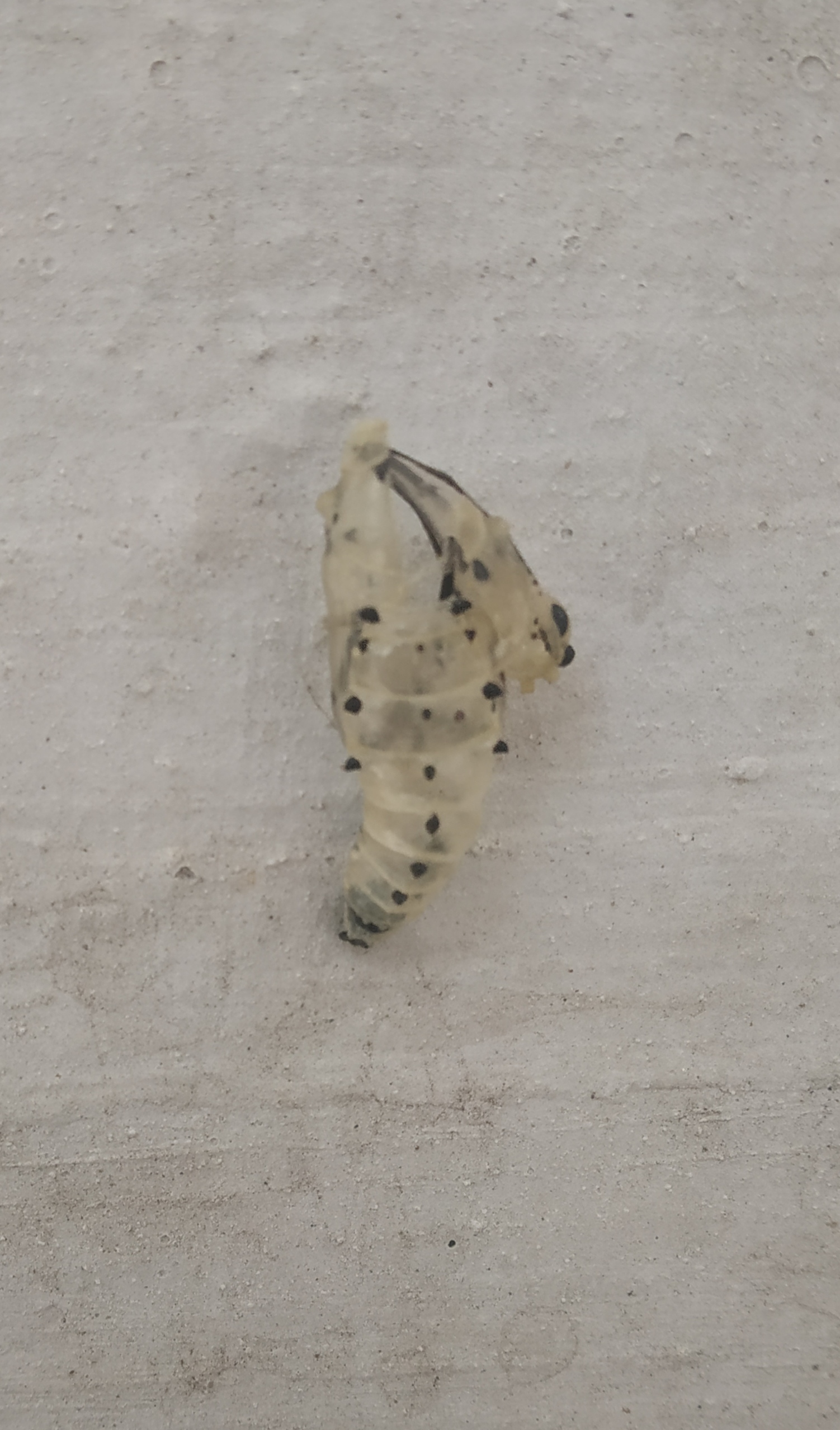
Pupal shell after butterfly has Emerged - Painted Jezebel

== Taxonomy ==
The subspecies of Delias hyparete listed chronologically are:

- D. h. hyparete (Linnaeus, 1758): Java, Bali, Lombok, Bawean Island, Madura Island, Kangean Isl
- D. h. hierta (Hübner, 1818): southern China, Hong Kong
- D. h. luzonensis (Felder, 1862): Luzon, Taiwan, Mindoro, Marindugue, Sibuyan, Polillo, Negros, Cebu, Bohol, Panay, Samar, Leyte, Panoan Island
- D. h. mindanaensis Mitis, 1893: Mindanao
- D. h. haemorrhoea Vollenhoven, 1865: Bangka Island
- D. h. indica Wallace, 1867: Nepal, Burma, Thailand, Vietnam, Yunnan, Hainan
- D. h. metarete Butler, 1879: Malaysian Peninsula, Andaman Islands, southern Thailand
- D. h. niasana Kheil, 1884: Nias, Banyak Island
- D. h. ethire Doherty, 1886: southern India
- D. h. lucina Distant & Pryer, 1887: Sulu-Island, Jolo Island
- D. h. palawanica Staudinger, 1889: Palawan, Calamian Island
- D. h. aurago Snellen, 1890: Belitung Island
- D. h. hypopelia Hagen, 1898: Sipora Island
- D. h. diva Fruhstorfer, 1906: Borneo, Laut Island, Karimata Island
- D. h. jakata Fruhstorfer, 1906: Batu Island
- D. h. despoliata Fruhstorfer, 1910: Sumatra
- D. h. domorana Fruhstorfer, 1911: Domoran Island
- D. h. isawae Nakona, 1987: Lingga Island, Anambas Island, Singkep Island
- D. h. itohi Nakona, 1993: Simeulue Island
- D. h. melville Yagishita, 1993: Balabac Island

== See also ==
- Pieridae
- List of butterflies of India
- List of butterflies of India (Pieridae)
