= Snake Skin Shoes =

1994 single by the Black Sorrows

Single by the Black Sorrows

from the album Lucky Charm
- B-side: "When It All Comes Down"; "Nobody Can Tell"; "Down to the Sea"
- Released: 13 June 1994
- Length: 4:45
- Label: Columbia
- Songwriters: Joe Camilleri, Jeff Griffin
- Producers: Joe Camilleri, Kerryn Tolhurst

The Black Sorrows singles chronology
"Stir It Up" (1993)	"Snake Skin Shoes" (1994)	"Last One Standing for You" (1994)

"Snake Skin Shoes" is a song by Australian blues and rock band the Black Sorrows. It was released as the first single from their eighth studio album, Lucky Charm, in June 1994. The song peaked at number 16 on the Australian Singles Chart in August 1994, becoming the group's second top-20 single.

== Track listing ==
CD single

1. "Snake Skin Shoes"
2. "When It All Comes Down"
3. "Nobody Can Tell"
4. "Down to the Sea"

== Charts ==
Chart (1994)	Peak position
Australia (ARIA)	16
Germany (GfK)	84
