= Freedom (Noiseworks song) =

- Australian CD single

Single by Noiseworks

from the album Love Versus Money
- B-side: "Believer"
- Released: 14 May 1990
- Recorded: 1990
- Genre: Rock
- Length: 3:17
- Label: Columbia
- Songwriters: Steve Balbi; Justin Stanley; Stuart Fraser; Jon Stevens
- Producer: Randy Jackson

Noiseworks singles chronology
"In My Youth" (1989)	"Freedom" (1990)	"Miles & Miles" (1990)

"Freedom" is a song by Australian rock-pop band Noiseworks. It was released in May 1990 as the first single from their third studio album Love Versus Money (1991) and peaked at number 30 on the ARIA singles chart in June 1990.

== Track listing ==
CD single (655832 7)

No.	Title	Writer(s)	Length
1.	"Freedom"	Steve Balbi, Justin Stanley	3:17
2.	"Believer"
3.	"Freedom" (cement mix)

== Charts ==
Chart (1990)	Peak position
Australia (ARIA)	30
