= Jezebel (Jon Stevens song) =

Single by Jon Stevens

from the album Jezebel
- A-side: "Jezebel"
- B-side: "Rest Your Love on Me"
- Released: October 1979
- Recorded: Marmalade Studios
- Genre: Pop rock
- Length: 3:28
- Label: CBS Records
- Songwriter(s): Eddie Howell
- Producer(s): Steve Robinson

Jon Stevens singles chronology
"Jezebel" (1979)	"Montego Bay" (1980)

"Jezebel" is a song recorded by New Zealand singer-songwriter Jon Stevens. The song was produced by Steve Robinson. It was released in October 1979 as Stevens' debut single and peaked at number one in New Zealand on 2 December 1979 and remained at the top for 9 weeks.

== Track listing ==
Vinyl, 7", 45 RPM

1. "Jezebel" - 3:28
2. "Rest Your Love on Me”" - 3:25

== Charts ==
Weekly chart performance for "Jezabel"
Chart (1979/80)	Peak position
New Zealand (RIANZ)	1

=== Year-end charts ===
Year-end chart performance for "Jezabel"
Chart (1979)	Position
New Zealand (RIANZ)	21

== See also ==
- List of number-one singles in 1979 (New Zealand)
- List of number-one singles from the 1980s (New Zealand)
