= R.I.P. (Millie) =

- Australian CD single

Single by Noiseworks

from the album Love Versus Money
- B-side: "It´s Gonna Get Better"
- Released: 2 September 1991
- Length: 4:37
- Label: Columbia
- Songwriters: Kevin Nicol; Jon Stevens; Steve Balbi; Justin Stanley; Stuart Fraser
- Producer: Randy Jackson

Noiseworks singles chronology
"Hot Chilli Woman" (1991)	"R.I.P. (Millie)" (1991)	"Take You Higher" (1992)

Alternative cover
- European CD single

"R.I.P. (Millie)" is a song by Australian hard rock band Noiseworks. It was released in September 1991 as the fourth single from their third studio album Love Versus Money (1991) and peaked at number 26 on the ARIA singles chart. The song is dedicated to Jon Stevens' mother who died of cancer. Stevens later reflected saying, "Over the years I've had so many people tell me how much "R.I.P (Millie)" has helped them deal with their own loss in their lives. To be able to impact on peoples lives in such a positive way is incredibly inspiring."

== Track listing ==
CD single (657371 5)

No.	Title	Writer(s)	Length
1.	"R.I.P. (Millie)"	Kevin Nicol, Jon Stevens, Steve Balbi, Justin Stanley, Stuart Fraser	4:37
2.	"In My Youth (Live On The Steps Of Parliament House) "	Jon Stevens, Justin Stanley	6:25

CD maxi (657371 2)

No.	Title	Length
1.	"R.I.P. (Millie)"	4:37
2.	"In My Youth"	3:32
3.	"R.I.P. (Millie)" (live)	5:00
4.	"In My Youth" (live)	6:25

== Charts ==
Chart (1991)	Peak position
Australia (ARIA)	26
New Zealand (Recorded Music NZ)	23
