= Miles & Miles =

- Australian CD single

Single by Noiseworks

from the album Love Versus Money
- B-side: "Be Somebody"
- Released: 22 October 1990
- Recorded: 1990
- Genre: Rock
- Length: 4:16
- Label: Columbia
- Songwriters: Steve Balbi; Justin Stanley; Jon Stevens; Stuart Fraser
- Producer: Noiseworks

Noiseworks singles chronology
"Freedom" (1990)	"Miles & Miles" (1990)	"Hot Chilli Woman" (1991)

"Miles & Miles" is a song by Australian rock-pop band Noiseworks. It was released in October 1990 as the second single from their third studio album Love Versus Money (1991) and peaked at number 26 on the ARIA Singles Chart.

== Track listing ==
CD single (656363 2)

No.	Title	Writer(s)	Length
1.	"Miles & Miles"	Steve Balbi, Justin Stanley, Jon Stevens, Stuart Fraser	4:16
2.	"Be Somebody"	Noiseworks	4:00

== Charts ==
Chart (1990–1991)	Peak position
Australia (ARIA)	26
