= Love Somebody (Noiseworks song) =

- Australian 7" single

Single by Noiseworks

from the album Noiseworks
- B-side: "Don't Wait"
- Released: 3 August 1987
- Recorded: February 1987
- Studio: Rhinoceros Studios
- Genre: Rock
- Length: 4:19
- Label: CBS
- Songwriter(s): Stuart Fraser; Jon Stevens
- Producer(s): Mark Opitz

Noiseworks singles chronology
"Take Me Back" (1987)	"Love Somebody" (1987)	"Welcome to the World" (1987)

"Love Somebody" is a song by Australian rock-pop band Noiseworks. It was released in August 1987 as the third single from their first studio album Noiseworks (1987) and peaked at number 50 on the Australian Kent Music Report.

== Track listing ==
7" (651016 7)

No.	Title	Writer(s)	Length
1.	"Love Somebody"	Stuart Fraser, Jon Stevens	4:19
2.	"Love Somebody" (live)	Stuart Fraser, Jon Stevens

12" (651016 6)

No.	Title	Writer(s)	Length
1.	"Love Somebody" (extended)	Stuart Fraser, Jon Stevens	12:45
2.	"Love Somebody" (live)	Fraser, Stevens
3.	"Body Sway" (live)

- Live tracks recorded on 3 June 1987 at Selina's Sydney

== Charts ==
Chart (1987)	Peak position
Australia (Kent Music Report)	50
