= Touch (Noiseworks song) =

- Australian CD single

Single by Noiseworks

from the album Touch
- B-side: "5 More Days"
- Released: 24 October 1988
- Recorded: July 1988
- Studio: Rhinoceros Studios
- Genre: Rock
- Length: 5:03
- Label: CBS
- Songwriters: Kevin Nicol; Steve Balbi; Stuart Fraser; Jon Stevens; Justin Stanley
- Producer: Chris Kimsey

Noiseworks singles chronology
"Burning Feeling" (1988)	"Touch" (1988)	"Voice of Reason" (1989)

Alternative cover
- European CD single

"Touch" is a song by Australian rock-pop band Noiseworks. It was released in October 1988 as the first single from their second studio album Touch (1988) and peaked at number 12 on the ARIA singles chart.

In July 2012, Jon Stevens (of Noiseworks) teamed up with production outfit Silver Sneakerz for a dance remix of "Touch". It was released on dance label Hussle Recordings (a division of Ministry of Sound). They performed the track live on The X Factor (Australia season 4) on 30 October 2012.

== Track listing ==
7" vinyl / CD single (653010 7)

No.	Title	Writer(s)	Length
1.	"Touch"	Steve Balbi, Justin Stanley	5:03
2.	"5 More Days"	Noiseworks	4:06

12" vinyl/ European maxi single (653010 3)

No.	Title	Writer(s)	Length
1.	"Touch"	Steve Balbi, Justin Stanley	5:03
2.	"5 More Days"	Noiseworks	4:06
3.	"Welcome to the World"	Jon Stevens, Stuart Fraser, Justin Stanley, Steve Balbi, Kevin Nicol	4:47
4.	"River of Tears"	Jon Stevens, Stuart Fraser, Justin Stanley	5:12

== Charts ==
Chart (1988–1989)	Peak position
Australia (ARIA)	12
New Zealand (Recorded Music NZ)	44
