= Jezebel (album) =

Studio album by Jon Stevens
- Released: February 1980
- Genre: Pop music, Rock music
- Label: CBS

Jon Stevens chronology
Jezebel (1980)	Jon Stevens (1982)

Singles from Jezebel
- 1. "Jezebel" Released: October 1979; 2. "Montego Bay" Released: January 1980; 3. "Don't Let Love Go" Released: February 1980

Jezebel is the debut studio album by New Zealand musician, Jon Stevens. The album contained two number one singles ("Jezebel" and "Montego Bay") and was released in February 1980. It peaked at number 7 on the New Zealand album chart and cemented Stevens’ position as New Zealand’s premier solo male artist of the time.

Stevens became the first New Zealand singer to have two singles in the top five at the same time ("Jezebel" at #1 and "Montego Bay" at #4) in January 1980.

== Track listing ==
Vinyl, cassette (SBP237419)

- A1 "Jezebel" - 3:25
- A2 "In a Stranger's Arms" - 4:05
- A3 "Seeing You (For The First Time)" - 4:54
- A4 "Wages Of Love" - 3:17
- A5 "Montego Bay" - 2:48
- B1 "Don't Let Love Go" (with Sharon O'Neill) - 3:22
- B2 "Jo" - 3:48
- B3 "Lady Blue" - 3:02
- B4 "The Honeymoon Is Over" - 3:02
- B5 "Lovin' Arms" - 3:00
- B6 "Ain't No Sunshine" - 2:47

== Charts ==
Chart (1980)	Peak position
New Zealand Albums Chart	7

== Certifications ==
Country	Certification
New Zealand	Gold
