= Noiseworks =

Australian rock band

- Noiseworks in 1990

Background information
- Origin: Sydney, New South Wales, Australia
- Genres: Hard rock, pub rock, AOR
- Years active: 1986–1992, 1999, 2004, 2007–2008, 2011, 2013, 2016–present
- Labels: CBS, Epic, Sony, Columbia, Sony BMG
- Members: Steve Balbi; Kevin Nicol; Jon Stevens; Tim Henwood; Tony Featherstone
- Past members: Stuart Fraser (deceased); Chris Becker; Barbara Griffin; Scott Aplin; Jack Jones; Justin Stanley
- Website: http://www.noiseworks.com.au/

Noiseworks are an Australian hard rock band formed in Sydney in 1986 with bass guitarist Steve Balbi, guitarist Stuart Fraser, drummer Kevin Nicol, keyboardist Justin Stanley and lead vocalist Jon Stevens. They had four Australian Top 10 albums, Noiseworks (1987), Touch (1988), Love Versus Money (1991) and Greatest Hits (1992). They produced three Top 10 singles, "Take Me Back", "Touch" and "Hot Chilli Woman" before disbanding in 1992. Reunion tours occurred in 1999, 2004, 2007–2008, 2011, 2013. The band later reformed in 2016 and in August 2022, released "Heart & Soul"; their first new song in 30 years. Noiseworks' fourth studio album, Evolution was released in November 2022.

== History ==
=== Formation ===
New Zealand-born pop singer Jon Stevens had released a solo album and several hit singles (including a duet with Sharon O'Neill) before relocating to Sydney in 1981. Stevens recorded a self-titled album for the Big Time label, two singles were issued but neither was successful. In 1983, Stevens formed The Change with guitarist Stuart Fraser, who had played in 1970s hard rock act Blackfeather (later called Feather) and then with fellow member Swanee. Bass player Steve Balbi, who was a member of Kevin Borich Express, played with The Change on their 1984 single "Forever Young". The following year, Stevens and Fraser hired Balbi and drummer Kevin Nicol (ex-Dial X). Justin Stanley was Balbi's song writing partner and joined the group in 1986, the band was renamed as Noiseworks.

=== 1986–1992: Noiseworks ===
Noiseworks was formed in Sydney with the line up of Steve Balbi on bass guitar and backing vocals; Stuart Fraser on guitar and backing vocals; Kevin Nicol on drums; Justin Stanley on keyboards, harmonica and backing vocals; and Jon Stevens on lead vocals. After quickly establishing a solid following on Sydney's pub rock circuit, Noiseworks was signed by CBS. Their first single, "No Lies", reached the Top 40 on the Kent Music Report Singles Chart. "Take Me Back" was more successful, making No. 7, and became one of the band's best known songs.

In June 1987 they released their debut self-titled album, Noiseworks, which was produced by Mark Opitz (The Angels, Cold Chisel) and engineered by Alan Wright (INXS, Icehouse, Ratt). It peaked at No. 6 on the Kent Music Report Albums Chart. "Love Somebody", "Welcome to the World" and "Burning Feeling" were also lifted from the album. Noiseworks sold more than 210,000 copies in Australia.

On 11 November 1988, their second album Touch was released and debuted at No. 5 on the ARIA Albums Chart. The album was produced by Chris Kimsey (The Rolling Stones, Killing Joke, Marillion) and Noiseworks, and engineered by Al Wright (Hoodoo Gurus, Jimmy Barnes, Divinyls). The title track preceded it as the first single, peaking at No. 12 on the ARIA Singles Chart. Subsequent singles "Voice of Reason", "Simple Man" and "In My Youth" were released. By this stage, Noiseworks had established themselves as one of Australia's most popular live rock acts.

The third album, Love Versus Money, had production started by Noiseworks but was initially rejected by their new label, Sony. Sony brought in Randy Jackson to assist in the album's production. Love Versus Money featured guest appearances by Michael Hutchence of INXS, Vika and Linda Bull and Penny Ford of the techno group Snap!. The first two singles, "Freedom" and "Miles & Miles" were moderate hits, but the third, the hard-rocking "Hot Chilli Woman", reached No. 7 and propelled the album to the top of the chart when it was released on 5 July 1991. Late in the year, a fourth single "R.I.P. (Millie)", a tribute to Stevens' mother who had recently died from cancer, was also released.

Stevens joined the cast of the Australian production of Jesus Christ Superstar in early 1992 in the role of Judas. Noiseworks disbanded following a final show in Sydney in March 1992. Later that year, the Greatest Hits compilation appeared, featuring a cover of The Beatles hit "Let It Be" which was released as a single. It had been recorded live at their last performance. The compilation peaked at No. 4 on the ARIA charts.

=== 1993: Post-Noiseworks and solo careers ===
Balbi and Stanley formed the psychedelic pop group Electric Hippies in 1993 and had top 30 success with the single, "Greedy People", and debut album, Electric Hippies both released in 1994. Electric Hippies were producers for different artists including, Vincent Stone, Jenny Morris and Nikka Costa (Stanley's wife). By 1997, Balbi had formed another band, Universe. Stanley and Costa moved to the US where Stanley went on to have a successful career producing and working with many artists including Eric Clapton, Beck, Prince and Sheryl Crow.

Stuart Fraser was also guitarist on Jesus Christ Superstar 1992 Australian Cast Recording The Album and the concerts events. After in 1993 Fraser joined The John Farnham band and has remained as a touring and recording member Fraser has recorded on these Farnham albums Romeo's Heart in 1996, 33.1/3 in 2000, The Last Time in 2002, I Remember When I Was Young in 2005, Jack in 2010 and The Acoustic Chapel Sessions in 2011. All albums and most tours were alongside John Farnham's longtime guitarist Brett Garsed who shared lead guitar duties with Fraser. On 1 December 2019, Stuart Fraser died after being diagnosed with lung cancer in 2016.

After the disbanding of Noiseworks, Stevens returned to his solo career and released further albums. He later appeared as the host of the reality TV show The Resort. In 2000 Stevens joined INXS, initially as a touring vocalist, but after being officially installed as a band member in October 2002 he left the band a year later. A single released by this version of the group, "I Get Up", was released.

=== 1999–2013: Noiseworks occasional reformations ===
In 1999, Fraser, Nicol and Stevens reformed Noiseworks (as Noiseworks II) with Chris Becker on bass guitar and Barbara Griffin on keyboards and toured Australia.

In March 2001, Noiseworks performed eight songs at the Gimme Ted benefit concert.

In September 2007, Noiseworks reformed, with Scott Aplin on keyboards in place of Stanley, for a national tour with The Choirboys and Balbi's project Move Trees. In December, Stevens announced that Noiseworks planned to return to the studio in 2008 to record their first studio album together in sixteen years.

In 2011, the original members reactivated for the Red Hot Summer tour. They also performed at Stone Fest in Sydney in 2013.

=== 2016–present: Noiseworks reformation and Evolution ===
In 2016, Noiseworks reformed for the Red Hot Summer tour, with the line-up including original members lead vocalist Jon Stevens, bass guitarist Steve Balbi, keyboardist Justin Stanley and drummer Kevin Nicol.

In August 2022, the band released the single "Heart & Soul", their first new single in thirty years. They will perform at One Electric Day with Suzi Quatro.

On 11 November 2022, the band released Evolution, their fourth studio and first new album in 31 years. The album debuted at number 25 on the ARIA Charts.

== Discography ==
=== Studio albums ===
| Title | Details | Peak chart positions | | | | Certifications (sales thresholds) |
| Title | Details | AUS | NZ | SWE | SWI | Certifications (sales thresholds) |
|---|---|---|---|---|---|---|
| Noiseworks | Released: June 1987; Label: CBS (451033.1); Producer: Mark Opitz | 6 | 6 | 43 | — | ARIA: 3× Platinum |
| Touch | Released: 14 November 1988; Label: CBS (463115.1); Producer: Chris Kimsey | 5 | 31 | 24 | 20 | ARIA: Platinum |
| Love Versus Money | Released: 8 July 1991; Label: Columbia / Sony (468447.2); Producer: Noiseworks, Randy Jackson | 1 | — | — | — | ARIA: Platinum |
| Evolution | Released: 11 November 2022; Label: Noiseworks (NOISE001); Producer: Steve Balbi | 25 | — | — | — | |
"—" denotes releases that did not chart or were not released in that country.

=== Compilation albums ===
| Title | Details | Peak chart positions | Certifications (sales thresholds) |
| Title | Details | AUS | Certifications (sales thresholds) |
|---|---|---|---|
| Greatest Hits | Released: 2 October 1992; Label: Columbia (472119.2) | 4 | ARIA: Platinum |
| The Essential Noiseworks | Released: 9 April 2007; Label: Sony BMG (88697069612) | — | |
"—" denotes releases that did not chart or were not released in that country.

=== Live albums ===
| Title | Details |
|---|---|
| Live + Loud | Released: 2008; Label: Noiseworks (NW08-LIVE); Producer: Steve Balbi |

=== Singles ===
| Year | Title | Peak chart positions | | | Album |
| Year | Title | AUS | NZ | UK | Album |
|---|---|---|---|---|---|
| 1986 | "No Lies" | 31 | 15 | — | Noiseworks |
| 1987 | "Take Me Back" | 7 | — | 94 | Noiseworks |
| 1987 | "Love Somebody" | 50 | — | — | Noiseworks |
| 1987 | "Welcome to the World" | 41 | — | — | Noiseworks |
| 1988 | "Burning Feeling" | 60 | — | — | Noiseworks |
| 1988 | "Touch" | 12 | 44 | — | Touch |
| 1989 | "Voice of Reason" | 43 | — | — | Touch |
| 1989 | "Simple Man" | 47 | — | — | Touch |
| 1989 | "In My Youth" | 44 | — | — | Touch |
| 1990 | "Freedom" | 30 | — | — | Love Versus Money |
| 1990 | "Miles & Miles" | 26 | — | — | Love Versus Money |
| 1991 | "Hot Chilli Woman" | 7 | 32 | — | Love Versus Money |
| 1991 | "R.I.P. (Millie)" | 26 | 23 | — | Love Versus Money |
| 1992 | "Take You Higher" (with Vika & Linda Bull) | 84 | — | — | Love Versus Money |
| 1992 | "Let It Be" (live) | 99 | — | — | Greatest Hits |
| 2022 | "Heart & Soul" | — (Note: "Heart & Soul" did not enter the Australian Top 100 singles but peaked at number 2 on the Australian Independent Label Singles chart.) | — | — | Evolution |
"—" denotes a recording that did not chart or was not released in that territory.
