= Last One Standing for You =

1994 single by the Black Sorrows and Jon Stevens

Single by the Black Sorrows and Jon Stevens

from the album Lucky Charm
- B-side: "Yesterday's Girl" (by the Black Sorrows)
- Released: 24 October 1994
- Length: 4:24
- Label: Columbia
- Songwriters: Laurie Polec; Joe Camilleri; J. Griffin
- Producer: Joe Camilleri

The Black Sorrows singles chronology
"Snake Skin Shoes" (1994)	"Last One Standing for You" (1994)	"Lucky Charm" (1995)

Jon Stevens singles chronology
"When?" (1994)	"Last One Standing for You" (1994)	"I Wish It Would Rain" (1994)

"Last One Standing for You" is a collaborative song by Australian musicians the Black Sorrows and Jon Stevens. It was released as the second single from the Sorrows' eighth studio album, Lucky Charm. It peaked at number 46 in Australia.

== Track listing ==
CD single

1. "Last One Standing for You"
2. "Yesterday's Girl" (by the Black Sorrows)

== Credits ==
- Acoustic guitar – Claude Carranza
- Backing vocals – Kenny Simpson, Ron Grant, Wayne Hernandez
- Bass – Steven Hadley
- Drums – Steve Ferrone
- Electric guitar – Stuart Fraser
- Engineer – Brent Clark, Phil Butson
- Keyboards – Charlie Giordano
- Tiple, mandolin – Kerryn Tolhurst
- Saxophone – Joe Camilleri

== Charts ==
Chart (1994)	Peak position
Australia (ARIA)	46
