= No Lies (song) =

- Australian 7" Single

Single by Noiseworks

from the album Noiseworks
- B-side: "Learning to Swim"
- Released: 13 October 1986
- Recorded: August 1986
- Studio: Rhinoceros Studios, Melbourne
- Genre: rock
- Length: 3:48
- Label: CBS Records
- Songwriters: Brent Thomas, Jon Stevens
- Producer: Mark Opitz

Noiseworks singles chronology
"No Lies" (1986)	"Take Me Back" (1987)

"No Lies" is the debut single by Australian rock-pop band Noiseworks. It was released in 1986 as the first single from their first studio album Noiseworks (1987) and peaked at number 31 on the Australian Kent Music Report.

== Track listing ==
7" (BA 3489)

No.	Title	Writer(s)	Length
1.	"No Lies"	Brent Thomas, Jon Stevens	3:48
2.	"Learning to Swim"	Jon Stevens, Stuart Fraser	3:47

== Charts ==
=== Weekly charts ===
Chart (1986–1987)	Peak position
Australia (Kent Music Report)	31
Italy Airplay (Music & Media)	18
New Zealand (Recorded Music NZ)	15
