= Take Me Back (Noiseworks song) =

- Australian 7" single

Single by Noiseworks

from the album Noiseworks
- B-side: "Don't Wait"
- Released: 13 April 1987
- Recorded: February 1987
- Studio: Rhinoceros Studios
- Genre: AOR
- Length: 3:29
- Label: CBS
- Songwriter(s): Brent Thomas; Jon Stevens
- Producer(s): Mark Opitz

Noiseworks singles chronology
"No Lies" (1986)	"Take Me Back" (1987)	"Love Somebody" (1987)

"Take Me Back" is a song by Australian rock-pop band Noiseworks, which was written by their lead vocalist Jon Stevens and sometime collaborator Brent Thomas. It was released in 1987 as the second single from their first studio album Noiseworks (1987), which was produced by Mark Opitz. The single peaked at number seven on the Australian Kent Music Report singles chart.

== Track listing ==
7" (650775 7)

No.	Title	Writer(s)	Length
1.	"Take Me Back"	Brent Thomas, Jon Stevens	3:29
2.	"Don't Wait"	Stevens, Justin Stanley, Stuart Fraser	3:37

12" (650775 6)

No.	Title	Writer(s)	Length
1.	"Take Me Back"	Thomas, Stevens	3:29
2.	"Take Me Back" (live)	Thomas, Stevens	2:05
3.	"Don't Wait"	Stevens, Stanley, Fraser	3:37

== Charts ==
=== Weekly charts ===
Chart (1987–1988)	Peak position
Australia (Kent Music Report)	7
UK Singles (OCC)	94

=== Year-end charts ===
Chart (1987)	Position
Australia (Australian Music Report)	61
