= Hot Chilli Woman =

- Australian CD single

Single by Noiseworks

from the album Love Versus Money
- B-side: "Poontang"
- Released: 17 June 1991
- Length: 3:25
- Label: Columbia
- Songwriter(s): Steve Balbi; Justin Stanley
- Producer(s): Randy Jackson

Noiseworks singles chronology
"Miles & Miles" (1990)	"Hot Chilli Woman" (1991)	"R.I.P. (Millie)" (1991)

"Hot Chilli Woman" is a song by Australian rock-pop band Noiseworks. It was released in June 1991 as the third single from their third studio album, Love Versus Money (1991), and peaked at number seven on the Australian ARIA Singles Chart.

== Track listing ==
CD single (656944 2)

No.	Title	Writer(s)	Length
1.	"Hot Chilli Woman"	Steve Balbi, Justin Stanley	3:25
2.	"Poontang"	Jon Stevens, Stuart Fraser, Balbi	2:59

== Charts ==
=== Weekly charts ===
Chart (1991)	Peak position
Australia (ARIA)	7
New Zealand (Recorded Music NZ)	32

=== Year-end charts ===
Chart (1991)	Position
Australia (ARIA)	58
