= Steve Balbi =

Australian musician and record producer

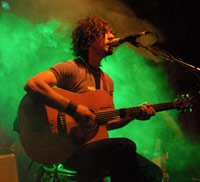
- Balbi live at the Vanguard

Background information
- Also known as: Vern
- Born: Stephen Vert Balbi; 3 October 1964 (age 61); Sydney, New South Wales, Australia
- Occupations: Musician, producer
- Instruments: Bass guitar, vocals, guitar
- Years active: 1976–present
- Labels: Foundry; Social Family
- Website: facebook.com/stevebalbiofficial

Stephen Vert Balbi (born 3 October 1964) is an Australian musician and record producer. He was the founding bass guitarist in pub rockers, Noiseworks in 1986 and formed a psychedelic pop group and production duo, Electric Hippies in 1993 with fellow Noiseworks member, Justin Stanley. He joined Mi-Sex in 2011. Balbi issued his debut solo album, Black Rainbow, in October 2013.

== Biography ==
=== 1960–1985: Early years ===
Steve Balbi was born in the mid-1960s and grew up in a Maltese family in Newtown, Sydney. He first performed publicly, with his uncle's band, at age 6, on a tambourine. He performed in Rufus Red. During the mid-to-late-1970s he was a bass guitarist for a blues, funk rock band, Rupert B. Other members were Mick Buckley on drums, Rohan Cannon on guitar and vocals, Guillermo Mayer on saxophone and Mick Thornton on slide trombone and trumpet. In 1976, at the age of 12, he was in a band, the Apaches, with his cousins, which performed "Fox on the Run" on a TV talent quest, Pot of Gold.

In mid-1982 Balbi, on bass guitar, joined Kevin Borich Express alongside Borich on lead guitar and lead vocals, John Annas on drums and Andy Cowan on keyboards (ex-Madder Lake, Ayers Rock). By 1984 the line-up of Balbi and Borich were joined by Adrian Cannon on drums (ex-Full Circle). At the end of that year Balbi also joined hard rockers, Rose Tattoo, and left both groups in 1985. While still a member of Kevin Borich Express, Balbi had guested on bass guitar for fellow Sydney-based band, the Change's single, "Forever Young", alongside that group's Stuart Fraser on lead guitar (ex-Feather, Smith), Kevin Nicol on drums (ex-Dial X) and Jon Stevens on lead vocals.

=== 1986–2008: Noiseworks, Electric Hippies & Universe ===
Early in 1986 the pub rockers, Noiseworks, were formed in Sydney with the line-up of Balbi on bass guitar and backing vocals, Justin Stanley on keyboards with the Change's Fraser, Nicol and Stevens. Stanley explained to Simon Moy of The Canberra Times how the group had formed "[Balbi and I] heard [Stevens], [Fraser] and [Nicol] were doing a little writing and playing around so we just got together one day down at the pub, got pissed and got on and that's how it went."

Noiseworks' debut studio album Noiseworks was released in July 1987. Noiseworks released two more studio albums, Touch in November 1988 and Love Versus Money in July 1991. Balbi described their writing style, "it's a real band thing for us. It's really funny, like the other night, on the way from Mildura to Adelaide, there were three of us in the car and we just wrote these lyrics – we finished three songs in that four-hour drive." The group had provided three multi-platinum albums, as certified by ARIA, before disbanding in March 1992.

In 1993 Balbi and Stanley formed a psychedelic pop group and production duo, Electric Hippies, which issued their debut extended play, It's Cool, in October of that year. It included the track, "Jonny Courageous"; according to Australian musicologist, Ian McFarlane, it "was reputedly a swipe at former Noiseworks frontman Jon Stevens." They followed with a top 30 single, "Greedy People" (June 1994), and their debut album, The Electric Hippies in October. For that album, Balbi provided lead guitar, bass guitar and lead vocals. McFarlane opined that it "mixed Revolver-era Beatles melodies with a Ziggy Stardust-period David Bowie glam rock aesthetic. There was also a limited edition version of the album which featured three-dimensional artwork à la The Rolling Stones' 1967 psychedelic album Their Satanic Majesties Request."

As producers, Electric Hippies, worked on material by Pearls & Swine, Vincent Stone (singles: "Sunshine" and "Best of My Love"; album: Vincent Stone, all in 1993), Juice, Jenny Morris and Nikka Costa (who was married to Stanley). Costa and Stanley returned to the United States in 1996 and Electric Hippies disbanded.

Balbi, on lead vocals, formed a new group, Universe, in 1997 which consisted of Jim Denley on flute, Cathy Green on bass guitar (ex-X), Matt McCormack a.k.a. Big Bird on guitar (ex-Starworld) and Cath Synnerdahl on drums (ex-Wrecking Crew, Mother Hubbard). The band released an EP, Above Water, in September 1997. Balbi, Green and McCormack were joined by Angus Diggs on drums and Ilan Kidron on flute for their single, "Be My Gun" (October 1998), and the related album, Present.

Balbi has also worked with David Bowie, among others.

In 2006, Balbi formed a new group, Move Treeswith, with Scott Aplin, Pete Skelton and Doug Aplin. In 2007, Move Trees joined Noiseworks on the road during their tour.

=== 2009–present : Solo work and Mi-Sex ===
In October 2009, Balbi, released his solo single "I Found You", out on UK label Foundry Records.

In 2011 Balbi fronting a newly reformed Mi-Sex, reunited for a fundraising concert following the 2011 Christchurch earthquake. Mi Sex released Not from Here in 2016, with Balbi as lead vocalist.

In 2013, Balbi released his debut solo album, Black Rainbow, and its subsequent reprise, Rainbow Black in 2016.

In August 2020, Balbi released I Think I Know for Sure.

In October 2024, Balbi was seriously injured in an accident, leading to the postponement of Mi-Sex's 45 Years of Graffiti Crimes Tour.

== Discography ==
=== Studio albums ===
Title	Details
Black Rainbow	Release date: 2013; Label: Social Family Records (SFR0004); Formats: CD, LP, digital
Rainbow Black (Surreal Edition)	Release date: 12 May 2016; Label: Steve Balbi; Formats: digital
I Think I Know for Sure	Release date: 21 August 2020; Label: Steve Balbi (TSK002CD); Formats: CD, LP, digital
Breakdown	Release date: 23 August 2024; Label: Steve Balbi (TSK006CD); Formats: CD, LP, digital

== Awards ==
=== Q Song Awards ===
The Queensland Music Awards (previously known as Q Song Awards) are annual awards celebrating Queensland, Australia's brightest emerging artists and established legends. They commenced in 2006.

Year	Nominee / work	Award	Result (wins only)
2007	"Dust" (with Mason Rack)	Blues and Roots Song of the Year	Won
