= Jon Stevens =

New Zealand singer (born 1961)

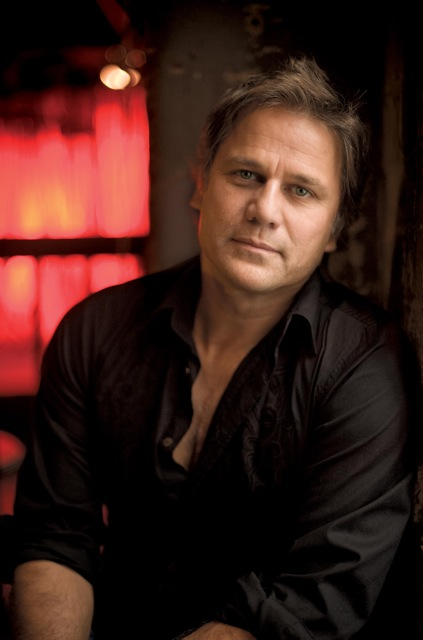
- Jon Stevens (in 2011 or earlier)
- Born: 8 October 1961 (age 65); Upper Hutt, New Zealand
- Citizenship: New Zealand; Australia
- Occupation: Singer
- Years active: 1980−present
- Partner: Heloise Pratt
- Family: Frankie Stevens (brother)
- Musical career
- Genres: Pop; hard rock; pub rock
- Occupation: Singer
- Instruments: Vocals; guitar
- Formerly of: Noiseworks; INXS; the Dead Daisies

Jon Stevens (born 8 October 1961) is a New Zealand singer, best known as the lead singer of the band Noiseworks in 1986–1992, the portrayal of Judas in a 1992 Australian production of Jesus Christ Superstar, and as the lead singer for the Australian rock band INXS in 2000–2003 after the death of the band's original lead singer Michael Hutchence.

== Biography ==
=== 1980–1986: career beginnings and Jezebel ===
Stevens was born in Upper Hutt, New Zealand, and is of Scottish and Māori descent. His brother is singer Frankie Stevens. He formed his first band while at Heretaunga College. Stevens released his debut studio album Jezebel on CBS Records in 1980. It peaked at number 7 on the New Zealand charts and was certified Gold. He had consecutive number one hits in New Zealand with singles "Jezebel" (December 1979) and "Montego Bay" (January 1980).

He moved to Australia in 1981 and subsequently became an Australian citizen. In 1982, a self-titled album was released, but was not successful. In 1983, Stevens formed the band the Change with guitarist Stuart Fraser. Over the next few years, additional members were added before renaming themselves as Noiseworks in 1986.

=== 1986–1992: Noiseworks and Jesus Christ Superstar ===
In 1986, Stevens became the lead singer of the Sydney band Noiseworks. The band released three platinum studio albums between 1987 and 1991, with a greatest hits released in 1992. The band had three top ten singles across that time, those being "Take Me Back", "Touch" and "Hot Chilli Woman".

In 1992, Stevens played the role of Judas in an Australian production of Jesus Christ Superstar. A cast recording album was released in July 1992, which peaked at number 1 and was the highest selling album in Australia in 1992.

=== 1993–1999: Solo work – Are U Satisfied and Circle ===
In 1993, Stevens signed with Columbia Records and released his third solo studio album, Are U Satisfied, which peaked at number 27 on the ARIA Charts. In 1994, Stevens recorded "Don't Knock My Love" with Kate Ceberano for her album Kate Ceberano and Friends. and released "Last One Standing For You" with Black Sorrows and a cover of the Temptations' "I Wish It Would Rain" with all proceeds from the song benefitting drought-stricken farmers.

In 1996, Stevens released his fourth studio album, Circle. In 1997, he recorded a cover of Frankie Goes To Hollywood's "Two Tribes". It was also the time in Australia when rugby league was going through a change with the split to "Super League". Television hosts, Foxtel, decided to use this song as their theme song for the series.

Stevens co-wrote the official song for the Sydney 2000 Olympics torch relay, entitled "Carry the Flame", with Barbara Griffin, who arranged the composition.

=== 2000–2003: INXS ===
From 2000 to 2003, Stevens fronted Australian rock band INXS after the death of their lead singer Michael Hutchence. Stevens toured with the band for a year before he was officially announced as their lead singer in March 2002, prior to a 40-city US tour. The Stevens-fronted INXS released a song in 2003 called "I Get Up" but he quit the band in October of that year before an album was released. Stevens explained in a May 2009 interview that his departure from the band was due to a creative lull:

After 3½ years I'd had enough - the creativity was too slow. I had too much going on with my own stuff and I just said, "No". No need to be going away for months on end, away from home, away from family. It's hard to justify it when you're just playing other people's songs.

=== 2004–2011: Solo work and touring ===
In late 2004, Stevens released his fifth studio album, Ain't No Life for the Faint Hearted, a modern R&B album that features a cover version of the Doors' "Light My Fire".

In 2005, Stevens released The Works, recorded as part of the Liberation Blue acoustic series, which included tracks from his time in Noiseworks. After a national tour with Ian Moss and the Choirboys— "Six Strings & The Works"—he completed a smaller acoustic tour, followed by a short break and an announcement that Noiseworks were preparing to tour again in late September 2007.

After two months on the road across Australia, Stevens took a break. In January 2008, Stevens's management confirmed plans for a massive national tour with Ian Moss, Jack Jones and Tania Doko. The tour was titled Let's Get Together and was scheduled to begin in Melbourne in April 2008, following Stevens's acoustic tour of regional Victoria with Australian country music singer Adam Brand.

In August 2011, Stevens released a new single "Just a Man" to Australian radio. A seventh solo studio album was released in September 2011 on new record label Universal Music Australia, called Changing Times. On 11 November 2011, a new album of soul music cover versions, called Testify!, was also released.

=== 2012–present: The Dead Daisies, Woman and Starlight ===
In July 2012, Stevens teamed up with production outfit Silver Sneakerz for a dance remix of Noiseworks' 1988 hit "Touch". It was released on dance label Hussle Recordings (a division of Ministry of Sound). They performed the track live on The X Factor Australia on 30 October 2012.

In 2013, Stevens contributed the song "Fly" for the soundtrack to the film Planes.

Also in 2012, Stevens formed the Dead Daisies with guitarist David Lowy, son of Australian shopping-centre magnate Frank Lowy. The two were introduced by David Edwards, ex-manager of INXS. The band's first single was "Lock N Load" featuring Guns N' Roses guitarist Slash, which was released in April 2013. The band's debut album was released in August 2013. In April 2015, the band announced that Stevens was no longer a member of the group.

Stevens signed with Social Family Records and released his ninth studio album titled Woman in September 2015. The album peaked at number 86 on the Australian ARIA Charts.

In 2016, Jon Stevens teamed up with Dave Stewart from Eurythmics and they wrote and recorded a new album called Starlight. The first single, "Hold On" was released on 13 February 2017, and the album was released on 31 March 2017. The album debuted at number 16 on the ARIA Charts; becoming Stevens' highest-charting album of his career.

In July 2025, Stevens released "Shimmer", the lead single from his forthcoming album.

== Causes ==
In 2012, Stevens is listed as a supporter of the "Oscar's Law" campaign, together with other publicly known figures. The campaign protests against the factory farming of companion animals and is named after a neglected dog found in central Victoria, Australia. Other notable supporters include Mark McEntee (musician), Mick Molloy (comedian) and the Essendon Football Club (Australian Football League).

== Discography ==
=== Solo albums ===
- Jezebel (1980)
- Jon Stevens (1982)
- Are U Satisfied (1993)
- Circle (1996)
- Ain't No Life for the Faint Hearted (2004)
- The Works (2005)
- Changing Times (2011)
- Testify! (2011)
- Woman (2015)
- Starlight (2017)
- Shimmer (2025)

== Awards and nominations ==
=== Country Music Awards (CMAA) ===
The Country Music Awards of Australia (CMAA) (also known as the Golden Guitar Awards) is an annual awards night held in January during the Tamworth Country Music Festival, celebrating recording excellence in the Australian country music industry. They have been held annually since 1973.

Year	Nominee / work	Award	Result
2016	"Spirit of the Anzacs" (with Lee Kernaghan, Guy Sebastian, Jessica Mauboy, Sheppard, Shannon Noll and Megan Washington)	Vocal Collaboration of the Year	Won
2016	"Spirit of the Anzacs" (with Lee Kernaghan, Guy Sebastian, Jessica Mauboy, Sheppard, Shannon Noll and Megan Washington)	Video clip of the Year	Won

=== Logie Awards ===
The Logie Awards (officially the TV Week Logie Awards) is an annual gathering to celebrate Australian television, sponsored and organised by magazine TV Week, with the first ceremony in 1959, known then as the TV Week Awards, the awards are presented in 20 categories representing both public and industry voted awards.

Year	Nominee / work	Award	Result
1993	"Everything's Alright" (with John Farnham and Kate Ceberano)	Most Popular Music Video	Won

=== New Zealand Music Awards ===
The New Zealand Music Awards are an annual awards night celebrating excellence in New Zealand music and have been presented annually since 1965.

Year	Nominee / work	Award	Result	Ref.
1979	Jon Stevens	Most Promising Male	Won	
1980	"Montego Bay"	Single of the Year	Won	
1980	Jon Stevens	Most Promising Male	Won	
1980	Jon Stevens	Male Vocalist of the Year	Won	
