= Pam Tillis discography =

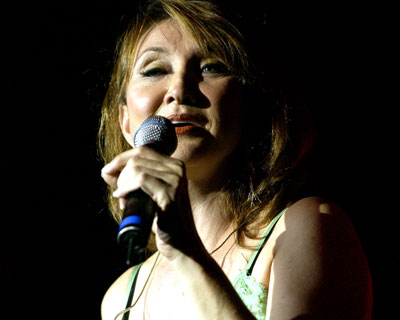
- Studio albums: 14
- Compilation albums: 6
- Singles: 45
- Video albums: 1
- Music videos: 25
- Other appearances: 11

The discography of American country music singer–songwriter, Pam Tillis, contains 14 studio albums, six compilation albums, one video album, 45 singles, 25 music videos and has appeared on 11 albums. Tillis's career was launched on the Warner Bros. label, where she released several unsuccessful singles and her debut studio album: Above and Beyond the Doll of Cutey (1983). Through Arista Nashville, her second studio album was released in January 1991 titled Put Yourself in My Place. The disc was her first commercial success, reaching number ten on America's Billboard Top Country Albums chart, number 69 on the Billboard 200 and number 12 on Canada's RPM country chart. The disc also certified gold in both countries and spawned five charting singles. Of these releases, "Don't Tell Me What to Do", "One of Those Things" and "Maybe It Was Memphis" reached the top ten of the Billboard Hot Country Songs chart. In September 1992, her third studio album was released called Homeward Looking Angel. The disc certified both gold and platinum in North America, while also spawning the Billboard and RPM top ten singles "Shake the Sugar Tree" and "Let That Pony Run".

In April 1994, Arista issued Sweetheart's Dance, which reached number six on the Billboard country albums chart and certified platinum in North America. Four of its five singles were top ten singles on either the Billboard or RPM country charts. Its third release, "Mi Vida Loca (My Crazy Life)", topped both the American and Canadian country songs charts. All of This Love was then issued in November 1995 and certified gold in the United States. Two of its singles reached the country top ten: "Deep Down" and "The River and the Highway". Her first compilation of Greatest Hits was released in July 1997 and certified platinum in the United States. Both of its new recordings were released as singles and reached the North American country top ten: "All the Good Ones Are Gone" and "Land of the Living". Arista Nashville issued two more of Tillis's studio albums: Every Time (1998) and Thunder & Roses (2001). Of its singles, only "I Said a Prayer" (1998) reached the top ten. Tillis then moved to independent labels for her future releases, beginning with It's All Relative: Tillis Sings Tillis. On her own Stellar Cat label, Tillis released several more studio albums, including RhineStoned (2007) and Looking for a Feeling (2020). Tillis also collaborated with Lorrie Morgan on two studio albums: Dos Divas (2013) and Come See Me and Come Lonely (2017).

== Albums ==
=== Studio albums ===
List of albums, with selected chart positions and certifications, showing other relevant details
| Title | Album details | Peak chart positions | | | Certifications |
| Title | Album details | US | US Cou. | CAN Cou. | Certifications |
|---|---|---|---|---|---|
| Above and Beyond the Doll of Cutey | Released: 1983; Label: Warner Bros.; Formats: LP, cassette | — | — | — | |
| Put Yourself in My Place | Released: January 29, 1991; Label: Arista Nashville; Formats: CD, cassette | 69 | 10 | 12 | MC: Gold; RIAA: Gold |
| Homeward Looking Angel | Released: September 29, 1992; Label: Arista Nashville; Formats: CD, cassette | 82 | 23 | 11 | MC: Gold; RIAA: Platinum |
| Sweetheart's Dance | Released: April 26, 1994; Label: Arista Nashville; Formats: CD, cassette | 51 | 6 | — | MC: Platinum; RIAA: Platinum |
| All of This Love | Released: November 7, 1995; Label: Arista Nashville; Formats: CD, cassette | 151 | 25 | 21 | RIAA: Gold |
| Every Time | Released: June 30, 1998; Label: Arista Nashville; Formats: CD, cassette | — | 24 | — | |
| Thunder & Roses | Released: March 6, 2001; Label: Arista Nashville; Formats: CD, cassette | 184 | 24 | — | |
| It's All Relative: Tillis Sings Tillis | Released: September 3, 2002; Label: Lucky Dog; Formats: CD | — | 54 | — | |
| RhineStoned | Released: April 17, 2007; Label: Stellar Cat; Formats: CD, music download | — | — | — | |
| Just in Time for Christmas | Released: November 13, 2007; Label: Stellar Cat; Formats: CD, music download | — | — | — | |
| Recollection (re-recordings) | Released: 2012; Label: Stellar Cat; Formats: CD | — | — | — | |
| Dos Divas (with Lorrie Morgan) | Released: July 23, 2013; Label: Red River; Formats: CD, music download | — | 62 | — | |
| Come See Me and Come Lonely (with Lorrie Morgan) | Released: November 10, 2017; Label: Goldenlane; Formats: CD, music download | — | — | — | |
| Looking for a Feeling | Released: April 24, 2020; Label: Stellar Cat; Formats: CD, music download | — | — | — | |
"—" denotes a recording that did not chart or was not released in that territory.

=== Compilation albums ===
List of albums, with selected chart positions and certifications, showing other relevant details
| Title | Album details | Peak chart positions | | Certifications |
| Title | Album details | US | US Cou. | Certifications |
|---|---|---|---|---|
| Collection | Released: February 1, 1994; Label: Warner Bros.; Formats: CD, cassette | — | — | |
| Greatest Hits | Released: June 3, 1997; Label: Arista Nashville; Formats: CD, cassette | 47 | 6 | RIAA: Platinum |
| Super Hits | Released: March 23, 1999; Label: Arista Nashville; Formats: CD, cassette | — | — | |
| RCA Country Legends | Released: April 9, 2002; Label: Arista/BMG; Formats: CD | — | — | |
| All American Country | Released: October 24, 2003; Label: BMG/Collectables; Formats: CD | — | — | |
| Super Hits | Released: June 22, 2004; Label: Arista Nashville; Formats: CD | — | — | |
"—" denotes a recording that did not chart or was not released in that territory.

== Singles ==
=== As lead artist ===
List of singles, with selected chart positions, showing other relevant details
| Title | Year | Peak chart positions | | | Album |
| Title | Year | US Bub. | US Cou. | CAN Cou. | Album |
|---|---|---|---|---|---|
| "Every Home Should Have One" | 1981 | — | — | — | —N/a |
| "Killer Comfort" | 1983 | — | — | — | Above and Beyond the Doll of Cutey |
| "Love Is Sneakin' Up on You" | 1983 | — | — | — | Above and Beyond the Doll of Cutey |
| "Goodbye Highway" | 1984 | — | 71 | — | —N/a |
| "One of Those Things" | 1985 | — | — | — | —N/a |
| "Those Memories of You" | 1986 | — | 55 | — | —N/a |
| "I Thought I'd About Had It with Love" | 1986 | — | 67 | — | —N/a |
| "I Wish She Wouldn't Treat You That Way" | 1987 | — | 68 | — | —N/a |
| "There Goes My Love" | 1987 | — | 71 | — | —N/a |
| "Don't Tell Me What to Do" | 1990 | — | 5 | 18 | Put Yourself in My Place |
| "One of Those Things" (Note: "One of Those Things" was re-recorded when it was released as a single again in 1991.) | 1991 | — | 6 | 5 | Put Yourself in My Place |
| "Put Yourself in My Place" | 1991 | — | 11 | 8 | Put Yourself in My Place |
| "Maybe It Was Memphis" | 1991 | — | 3 | 4 | Put Yourself in My Place |
| "Blue Rose Is" | 1992 | — | 21 | 24 | Put Yourself in My Place |
| "Shake the Sugar Tree" | 1992 | — | 3 | 3 | Homeward Looking Angel |
| "Let That Pony Run" | 1993 | — | 4 | 7 | Homeward Looking Angel |
| "Cleopatra, Queen of Denial" | 1993 | — | 11 | 16 | Homeward Looking Angel |
| "Do You Know Where Your Man Is" | 1993 | — | 16 | 19 | Homeward Looking Angel |
| "Spilled Perfume" | 1994 | — | 5 | 9 | Sweetheart's Dance |
| "When You Walk in the Room" | 1994 | — | 2 | 13 | Sweetheart's Dance |
| "Mi Vida Loca (My Crazy Life)" | 1994 | — | 1 | 1 | Sweetheart's Dance |
| "I Was Blown Away" | 1995 | — | 16 | 20 | Sweetheart's Dance |
| "In Between Dances" | 1995 | — | 3 | 7 | Sweetheart's Dance |
| "Deep Down" | 1995 | — | 6 | 2 | All of This Love |
| "The River and the Highway" | 1996 | — | 8 | 14 | All of This Love |
| "It's Lonely Out There" | 1996 | — | 14 | 21 | All of This Love |
| "Betty's Got a Bass Boat" | 1996 | — | 62 | 71 | All of This Love |
| "All the Good Ones Are Gone" | 1997 | — | 4 | 4 | Greatest Hits |
| "Land of the Living" | 1997 | — | 5 | 16 | Greatest Hits |
| "I Said a Prayer" | 1998 | 2 | 12 | 7 | Every Time |
| "Every Time" | 1998 | — | 38 | 50 | Every Time |
| "After a Kiss" | 1999 | — | 50 | 68 | Happy, Texas (soundtrack) |
| "Please" | 2000 | 20 | 22 | — | Thunder & Roses |
| "Thunder & Roses" | 2001 | — | — | — | Thunder & Roses |
| "Band in the Window" | 2007 | — | — | — | RhineStoned |
| "The Hard Way" | 2007 | — | — | — | RhineStoned |
| "Looking for a Feeling" | 2020 | — | — | — | Looking for a Feeling |
"—" denotes a recording that did not chart or was not released in that territory.

=== As a collaborative and featured artist ===
List of singles, with selected chart positions, showing other relevant details
| Title | Year | Peak chart positions | | | Album |
| Title | Year | US | US Cou. | CAN Cou. | Album |
|---|---|---|---|---|---|
| "Tomorrow's World" (credited with various artists) (Note: Multi-artist collaboration featuring Lynn Anderson, Butch Baker, Shane Barmby, Billy Hill, Suzy Bogguss, Kix Brooks, T. Graham Brown, The Burch Sisters, Holly Dunn, Foster & Lloyd, Vince Gill, William Lee Golden, Highway 101, Shelby Lynne, Johnny Rodriguez, Dan Seals, Les Taylor, Pam Tillis, Mac Wiseman, and Kevin Welch.) | 1990 | — | 74 | — | —N/a |
| "Romeo" (credited as Dolly Parton & Friends) | 1993 | 50 | 27 | 33 | Slow Dancing with the Moon |
| "Same Old Train" (credited with various artists) (Note: Multi-artist collaboration featuring Clint Black, Joe Diffie, Merle Haggard, Emmylou Harris, Alison Krauss, Patty Loveless, Earl Scruggs, Ricky Skaggs, Marty Stuart, Pam Tillis, Randy Travis, Travis Tritt, and Dwight Yoakam.) | 1998 | — | 59 | — | Tribute to Tradition |
| "Two Kings" (with Kris Thomas) | 2012 | — | — | — | —N/a |
| "I Know What You Did Last Night" (with Lorrie Morgan) | 2013 | — | — | — | Dos Divas |
| "I Am a Woman" (with Lorrie Morgan) | 2013 | — | — | — | Dos Divas |
| "Heart Over Mind" (Presley & Taylor featuring Pam Tillis) | 2017 | — | — | — | —N/a |
| "Come to Mama" (Live) (with Ashley Cleveland, Karen Staley and Tricia Walker) | 2019 | — | — | — | —N/a |
"—" denotes a recording that did not chart or was not released in that territory.

== Videography ==
=== Video albums ===
List of albums, showing all relevant details
| Title | Album details |
|---|---|
| Live at the Renaissance Center | Released: November 15, 2005; Label: Music Video Distributors; Formats: DVD |

=== Lead music videos ===
List of music videos, showing year released and director
| Title | Year | Director(s) | Ref. |
|---|---|---|---|
| "Killer Comfort" | 1983 | —N/a | |
| "Don't Tell Me What to Do" | 1990 | Gerry Wenner | |
| "Put Yourself in My Place" | 1991 | Michael Merriman | |
| "Maybe It Was Memphis" | 1991 | D. J. Webster | |
| "Shake the Sugar Tree" | 1992 | Steven Goldmann | |
| "Let That Pony Run" | 1993 | Steven Goldmann | |
| "Cleopatra, Queen of Denial" | 1993 | Michael Salomon | |
| "Spilled Perfume" | 1994 | Steven Goldmann | |
| "When You Walk in the Room" | 1994 | Steven Goldmann | |
| "Mi Vida Loca (My Crazy Life)" | 1994 | Roger Pistole | |
| "In Between Dances" | 1995 | Roger Pistole | |
| "Deep Down" | 1995 | Steven Goldmann | |
| "The River and the Highway" | 1996 | Steven Goldmann | |
| "Betty's Got a Bass Boat" | 1996 | Michael Salomon | |
| "All the Good Ones Are Gone" | 1997 | Steven Goldmann | |
| "I Said a Prayer" | 1998 | Thom Oliphant | |
| "After a Kiss" | 1999 | Morgan Lawley | |
| "So Wrong" | 2002 | Trey Fanjoy | |
| "Beautiful Night" | 2006 | Milton Sneed | |
| "Band in the Window" | 2007 | Matt Spicher; Glenn Sweitzer | |
| "Two Kings" (with Kris Thomas) | 2011 | Molly Secours | |
| "The Monster and the Banjo" | 2012 | David Spicher | |

=== Featured music videos ===
List of music videos, showing year released and director
| Title | Year | Director(s) | Ref. |
|---|---|---|---|
| "I Don't Need Your Rockin' Chair" (George Jones with various artists) | 1992 | Marc Ball | |
| "Don't Let Our Love Start Slippin' Away" (Vince Gill with The Kentucky Headhunters, Patty Loveless, Reba McEntire, Lee Roy Parnell, Pam Tillis, Kelly Willis, Kevin Welch and Fred Young) | 1992 | John Lloyd Miller | |
| "He Thinks He'll Keep Her" (Mary Chapin Carpenter with various artists) | 1994 | Bud Schaetzle | |
| "She Drives Me Crazy" (The Muppets with Pam Tillis) | 1994 | John Landis | |
| "Same Old Train" (with various artists) | 1998 | Steve Boyle | |
| "Glamazon" (RuPaul with Pam Tillis) | 2012 | Candis Cayne | |
| "Lost Boy" (with The Render Sisters) | 2020 | Josh Sikkema; Pam Tillis | |

== Other appearances ==
List of non-single guest appearances, with other performing artists, showing year released and album name
| Title | Year | Other artist(s) | Album | Ref. |
|---|---|---|---|---|
| "Pull Your Hat Down Tight" | 1994 | —N/a | 8 Seconds | |
| "Colors of the Wind" | 1996 | —N/a | The Best of Country Sings the Best of Disney | |
| "Milk and Honey" | 1998 | —N/a | The Prince of Egypt: Nashville | |
| "What We Believe In" | 1999 | Jim Brickman | Destiny | |
| "Golden Ring" | 1999 | Jason Sellers | A Matter of Time | |
| "Will You Miss Me" | 2001 | Ralph Stanley | Clinch Mountain Sweethearts | |
| "Almost Over (Gettin' Over You)" | 2006 | Billy Gilman | Billy Gilman | |
| "Precious Memories" | 2007 | Brenda Lee | Gospel Duets with Treasured Friends | |
| "My Town Has Moved Away" | 2011 | Blackie and the Rodeo Kings | Kings and Queens | |
| "The Messenger" | 2020 | Ronnie Dunn; Ray Wylie Hubbard | Co-Starring | |
| "Silver Bells" | 2020 | Suzy Bogguss; Terri Clark | It's Christmas...Cheers! | |
