= Greatest Hits (Pam Tillis album) =

Compilation album by Pam Tillis

Greatest hits album by Pam Tillis
- Released: June 3, 1997
- Genre: Country
- Length: 41:41
- Label: Arista Nashville
- Producer: Steve Fishell, Ed Seay, Pam Tillis, Billy Joe Walker, Jr., Paul Worley

Pam Tillis chronology
All of This Love (1995)	Greatest Hits (1997)	Every Time (1998)

Professional ratings
Review scores
Source	Rating
AllMusic	4.5/5 stars

Greatest Hits is a 1997 compilation album from American country music artist Pam Tillis. The album reached #6 on the Billboard country albums charts. It chronicles her greatest hits from her first four albums for Arista Nashville. The tracks "Land of the Living" and "All the Good Ones Are Gone" are new to this compilation. Both were released as singles, reaching Top Five on the Hot Country Songs charts in 1997. The album was certified Platinum by the Recording Industry Association of America (RIAA) for shipments of over 1,000,000 copies in the U.S. This was the last of her albums to receive certification in sales. "Land of the Living" would also be Pam's last top 10 appearance in the Country Singles Charts.

== Track listing ==
No.	Title	Writer(s)	Length
1.	"Land of the Living"	Wayland Patton, Tia Sillers	3:32
2.	"All the Good Ones Are Gone"	Dean Dillon, Bob McDill	3:17
3.	"Don't Tell Me What to Do"	Harlan Howard, Max D. Barnes	3:12
4.	"Maybe It Was Memphis"	Michael Anderson	4:00
5.	"Shake the Sugar Tree"	Chapin Hartford	3:08
6.	"Let That Pony Run"	Gretchen Peters	3:30
7.	"Cleopatra, Queen of Denial"	Pam Tillis, Bob DiPiero, Jan Buckingham	3:12
8.	"Spilled Perfume"	Tillis, Dillon	3:53
9.	"When You Walk in the Room"	Jackie DeShannon	2:44
10.	"In Between Dances"	Barry Alfonso, Craig Bickhardt	3:21
11.	"Mi Vida Loca (My Crazy Life)"	Tillis, Jess Leary	2:51
12.	"The River and the Highway"	Gerry House, Don Schlitz	4:21

== Production ==
Credits adapted from Discogs.

- Tracks 1 and 2 produced by Billy Joe Walker, Jr. and Pam Tillis
- Tracks 3–7 produced by Paul Worley and Ed Seay
- Tracks 8–11 produced by Pam Tillis and Steve Fishell
- Track 12 produced by Pam Tillis

== Personnel ==
- Eddie Bayers – drums
- Richard Bennett – acoustic guitar, electric guitar
- Stephanie Bentley – background vocals
- Bruce Bouton – steel guitar
- Mike Brignardello – bass guitar
- Melissa Britt – background vocals
- Dennis Burnside – organ, piano
- Larry Byrom – electric guitar
- Mary Chapin Carpenter – background vocals
- Joe Chemay – bass guitar
- Ashley Cleveland – background vocals
- Bob DiPiero – 12-string acoustic guitar
- Dan Dugmore – acoustic guitar
- Stuart Duncan – fiddle
- Mike Elmore – electric guitar
- Paul Franklin – steel guitar
- Sonny Garrish – steel guitar, lap steel guitar
- Steve Gibson – electric guitar
- Vince Gill – background vocals
- Rob Hajacos – fiddle
- Vicki Hampton – background vocals
- John Hobbs – piano
- Dann Huff – electric guitar
- Bill Hullett – acoustic guitar, electric guitar, mandolin
- Carl Jackson – acoustic guitar
- John Barlow Jarvis – accordion, keyboards
- John Jorgenson – electric guitar, acoustic guitar solo
- Mary Ann Kennedy – background vocals
- Paul Leim – drums
- Greg Leisz – steel guitar
- Terry McMillan – percussion
- Liana Manis – background vocals
- Anthony Martin – piano, synthesizer
- Brent Mason – electric guitar
- Steve Nathan – piano, synthesizer
- Mark O'Connor – fiddle, mandolin
- Bobby Ogdin – synthesizer
- Larry Paxton – bass guitar
- Suzy Ragsdale – background vocals
- Kim Richey – background vocals
- Matt Rollings – piano
- Pamela Rose – background vocals
- Milton Sledge – drums
- Blaine Sprouse – fiddle
- Karen Staley – background vocals
- Harry Stinson – percussion, background vocals
- Pam Tillis – lead vocals, background vocals
- Cindy Richardson-Walker – background vocals
- Billy Joe Walker Jr. – acoustic guitar, electric guitar
- Tricia Walker – background vocals
- Biff Watson – acoustic guitar
- Willie Weeks – bass guitar
- Lonnie Wilson – drums, percussion
- Glenn Worf – bass guitar
- Paul Worley – acoustic guitar, electric guitar

== Charts ==
=== Weekly charts ===
Chart (1997)	Peak position
US Billboard 200	47
US Top Country Albums (Billboard)	6

=== Year-end charts ===
Chart (1997)	Position
US Top Country Albums (Billboard)	35
Chart (1998)	Position
US Top Country Albums (Billboard)	60
