= 1991 Country Music Association Awards =

Annual US music awards ceremony

- Date: September 28, 1991 (Broadcast on October 2, 1991)
- Location: Grand Ole Opry House, Nashville, Tennessee
- Hosted by: Reba McEntire
- Most wins: Garth Brooks (4)
- Most nominations: Vince Gill; Alan Jackson (6 each)

Television/radio coverage
- Network: CBS

The 1991 Country Music Association Awards, 25th Ceremony, was held on September 28, 1991 at the Grand Ole Opry House, Nashville, Tennessee, and was hosted by CMA Award Winner Reba McEntire.

== Winners and Nominees ==
Winner are in Bold.

Entertainer of the Year	Album of the Year
**Garth Brooks**; Clint Black; Vince Gill; Reba McEntire; George Strait	**No Fences — Garth Brooks**; Don't Rock the Jukebox — Alan Jackson; Pocket Full of Gold — Vince Gill; Put Yourself in My Shoes — Clint Black; Rumor Has It — Reba McEntire
Male Vocalist of the Year	Female Vocalist of the Year
**Vince Gill**; Clint Black; Garth Brooks; Alan Jackson; George Strait	**Tanya Tucker**; Patty Loveless; Kathy Mattea; Reba McEntire; Lorrie Morgan
Vocal Group of the Year	Vocal Duo of the Year
**Kentucky HeadHunters**; Alabama; Diamond Rio; Restless Heart; Shenandoah	**The Judds**; Baillie & The Boys; Bellamy Brothers; Foster & Lloyd; Sweethearts of the Rodeo
Single of the Year	Song of the Year
**"Friends In Low Places" — Garth Brooks**; "Don't Rock the Jukebox" — Alan Jackson; "Don't Tell Me What to Do" — Pam Tillis; "Here's a Quarter (Call Someone Who Cares)" — Travis Tritt; "Pocket Full of Gold" — Vince Gill	**"When I Call Your Name" — Vince Gill and Tim DuBois**; "Don't Rock the Jukebox" — Alan Jackson, Keith Stegall, and Roger Murrah; "Friends In Low Places" — Dewayne Blackwell and Earl Bud Lee; "Here in The Real World" — Alan Jackson and Mark Irwin; "The Dance" — Tony Arata
Horizon Award	Musician of the Year
**Travis Tritt**; Mary Chapin Carpenter; Mark Chesnutt; Doug Stone; Pam Tillis	**Mark O'Connor**; Chet Atkins; Barry Beckett; Paul Franklin; Matt Rollings
Music Video of the Year	Vocal Event of the Year
**"The Thunder Rolls" — Garth Brooks**; "Come Next Monday" — K.T. Oslin; "Don't Rock the Jukebox" — Alan Jackson; "Fancy" — Reba McEntire; "Love Can Build A Bridge" — The Judds	**The New Nashville Cats — Mark O'Connor (feat. Vince Gill, Ricky Skaggs, and Steve Wariner)**; Neck and Neck — Chet Atkins and Mark Knopfler; "Rockin' Years" — Dolly Parton and Ricky Van Shelton; Highwaymen 2 — Willie Nelson, Kris Kristofferson, Johnny Cash, and Waylon Jennings; “A Few Ole Country Boys” — Randy Travis and George Jones

== Performers ==
Performer(s)	Song(s)
Mark O'Connor; Vince Gill; Ricky Skaggs; Steve Wariner; Alison Krauss; Carl Perkins	"Restless"
George Strait	"You Know Me Better Than That"
Trisha Yearwood	"She's in Love with the Boy"
Alan Jackson	"Don't Rock the Jukebox"
Vince Gill; Patty Loveless	"Pocket Full of Gold"
Clint Black; Roy Rogers	"Hold On Partner"
Travis Tritt; Doug Stone; Pam Tillis; Mark Chesnutt; Mary Chapin Carpenter	Horizon Award Medley "Here's a Quarter (Call Someone Who Cares)" "In a Different Light" "Put Yourself in My Place"; Brother Jukebox; Down at the Twist and Shout
Mike Reid	Medley "Old Folks" "Stranger in My House" "Forever's as Far as I'll Go" "Walk on Faith"
Garth Brooks	"Shameless"
Dolly Parton	"Eagle When She Flies"
Reba McEntire	"For My Broken Heart"

== Presenters ==
Presenter(s)	Notes
Anne Murray	Single of the Year
George Jones; Lorrie Morgan	Vocal Group of the Year
Johnny Cash	Album of the Year
Vince Gill; Patty Loveless	Vocal Duo of the Year
Clint Black; Roy Rogers	Female Vocalist of the Year
The Judds	Horizon Award
Mike Reid	Song of the Year
Kathy Mattea	Male Vocalist of the Year
Ricky Van Shelton	Video of the Year
Dolly Parton	Presented Irving Waugh Award to Jo Walker Meador
James Blundell; Sweethearts of the Rodeo	Vocal Event of the Year
Barbara Mandrell	Presented Country Music Hall of Fame Induction of Boudleaux and Felice Bryant
Eddy Arnold	Entertainer of the Year

== Hall of Fame ==
Country Music Hall of Fame Inductees
- Boudleaux and Felice Bryant
