= Collection (Pam Tillis album) =

Compilation album by Pam Tillis
- Released: February 1, 1994
- Genre: Country
- Length: 33:38
- Label: Warner Brothers
- Producer: Marshall Morgan; Steve Buckingham

Pam Tillis chronology
Homeward Looking Angel (1992)	Collection (1994)	Sweetheart's Dance (1994)

Reissue cover

Pam Tillis Collection is a compilation of songs that Pam Tillis did for Warner Brothers before going on to bigger success with Arista. It was released February 1, 1994. Collection was reissued by Warner Brothers in 2000 as Super Hits, not to be confused with two other Tillis albums also called Super Hits, released by both Arista and BMG.

== Critical reception ==
Professional ratings
Review scores
Source	Rating
AllMusic	4.5/5 stars
EW	C
Country Universe	2.5/5 stars

Brian Mansfield of AllMusic says, "what makes Collection interesting is early versions of "One of Those Things" and "Maybe It Was Memphis" as well as a version of "Five Minutes," later a hit for Lorrie Morgan."

Alanna Nash of EW writes, "What a difference a new producer makes! Warner Bros. spent five years of the '80s trying to do what Arista then did in one, which is make Mel's little girl a star. Here's Pam Tillis Collection (Warner Bros.), the best of what she recorded before leaving for her current label."

Kevin John Coyne of Country Universe remarks, "It has to be frustrating for a label to see an artist that they never had success with go on to another label in town and become a big star right off the bat."

== Track listing ==
No.	Title	Writer(s)	Length
1.	"Maybe It Was Memphis"	Michael Anderson	3:20
2.	"One of Those Things"	Pam Tillis; Paul Overstreet	3:38
3.	"I Thought I'd About Had It With Love"	Milton Brown; Beth Nielsen Chapman	2:41
4.	"There Goes My Love"	Buck Owens	2:02
5.	"Sometimes a Stranger Will Do"	Pat Bunch; Pam Rose; Mary Ann Kennedy	3:51
6.	"Those Memories of You"	Alan O'Bryant	4:10
7.	"I Wish She Wouldn't Treat You That Way"	Kevin Welch; Walker Igleheart	3:01
8.	"Tennessee Nights"	Shawna Harrington; Jan Buckingham	3:39
9.	"Five Minutes"	Beth Nielsen Chapman	3:41
10.	"Goodbye Highway"	Pam Tillis; Pam Rose; Mary Ann Kennedy	3:35
Total length:			33:38

== Production ==
- Producer – Steve Buckingham, Marshall Morgan
- Selections compiled by Martha Sharp
- Digitally remastered by Ken Love at MasterMix, Nashville, TN
- Art Direction – Aimee McMahan
- Design – George Otvos

Track information and credits verified from the album's liner notes, AllMusic and Discogs.
