= Helen Darling (singer) =

American singer-songwriter

- Born: May 1, 1965 (age 61)
- Origin: Baton Rouge, Louisiana, USA
- Genre: Country
- Occupation: Singer
- Instrument: Vocals
- Years active: 1995–present
- Label: Decca Nashville

Helen Darling (born May 1, 1965 in Baton Rouge, Louisiana) is an American country music artist. Darling has released one studio album on Decca Nashville. She also charted one single on the Billboard Hot Country Singles & Tracks chart; "Jenny Come Back", peaked at No. 69 in 1995.

Darling sang background vocals on Garth Brooks' 1994 single "The Red Strokes". Brooks returned the favor by singing background on Darling's album. Two years later, she sang "I Will Always Be With You" for MGM's All Dogs Go to Heaven 2 with Frazier River frontman Danny Frazier in the credits. She also sang "Love Led Us Here" for Disney's Muppet Treasure Island with John Berry in the credits.

A second album, West of Yesterday, was planned for release in early 1997, but was scrapped. One of the unreleased tracks, "Land of the Living" would later be recorded by Pam Tillis for her 1997 Greatest Hits compilation, where it became her final top ten country hit.

As a songwriter, Darling has had her songs recorded by Reba McEntire, Little Big Town and Mindy McCready, among others. She also co-wrote Jo Dee Messina's Number One song "Bring On the Rain".

== Helen Darling (1995) ==
Helen Darling

Studio album by Helen Darling
- Released: August 15, 1995
- Studios: Javelina Recording Studios (Nashville, TN)
- Genre: Country
- Length: 37:23
- Label: Decca Nashville
- Producers: Michael Omartian; Mark Wright

Helen Darling chronology
Helen Darling (1995)	Who I Am Tonight (2003)

Singles from Helen Darling
- 1. "Jenny Come Back" Released: July 10, 1995; 2. "I Haven't Found It Yet" Released: October 23, 1995

Helen Darling is the debut studio album by Darling. It was released on August 15, 1995, via Decca Nashville. The song "Even God Must Get the Blues" would later be recorded by Jo Dee Messina on her 2000 album Burn.

=== Critical reception ===
Professional ratings
Review scores
Source	Rating
Allmusic	4.5/5 stars

Stephen Thomas Erlewine of AllMusic rated the album a 4 1/2 of 5, saying her music is reminiscent of Garth Brooks's country rock. Norm Rosenfield of Country Standard Time gave it a positive review, saying Darling sounded strong and confident on the album.

=== Personnel ===
Taken from the liner notes.

- Brent Rowan – electric guitar
- Mike Brignardello – bass
- Paul Franklin – steel guitar
- Rob Hajacos – fiddle
- Paul Leim – drums
- B. James Lowry – acoustic guitar
- Delbert McClinton – harmonica on "Black and White and Blue"
- Lee Roy Parnell – slide guitar on "Black and White and Blue"
- Michael Omartian – keyboards
- Biff Watson – acoustic guitar

=== Track listing ===
Helen Darling track listing
No.	Title	Writer(s)	Length
1.	"Jenny Come Back"	Tia Sillers; John Tirro	3:12
2.	"I Haven't Found It Yet"	Helen Darling; Chuck Jones	3:29
3.	"Into the Storm"	Deborah Allen; Billy Burnette; Rafe Van Hoy	4:40
4.	"I Love Him, I Think"	Cathy Majeski; Sunny Russ; Stephony Smith	3:49
5.	"When the Butterflies Have Flown Away"	Darling; Tena Clark; Gary Prim	3:31
6.	"Black and White and Blue"	Tony Arata	3:50
7.	"With Every Twist and Turn"	Susan Duffy	2:51
8.	"That's How You Know It's Love"	Smith	3:51
9.	"Next to Love"	Chuck Cannon; Lari White	4:18
10.	"Even God Must Get the Blues"	Dene Anton; John Scott Sherrill	3:46
Total length:			37:23

== Singles ==
Year	Single	Peak chart positions		Album
Year	Single	US Country	CAN Country	Album
1995	"Jenny Come Back"	69	86	Helen Darling
1996	"I Haven't Found It Yet"	—	—	Helen Darling
1996	"Full Deck of Cards"	—	90	West of Yesterday (unreleased)
"—" denotes releases that did not chart

== Music videos ==
Year	Video	Director
1995	"Jenny Come Back"	Greg Vernon
1996	"I Haven't Found It Yet"	Charley Randazzo
1996	"Full Deck of Cards"	Michael McNamara
