= Land of the Living (Pam Tillis song) =

Single by Pam Tillis

from the album Greatest Hits
- Released: August 25, 1997
- Studio: Emerald Sound Studio (Nashville, TN)
- Genre: Country
- Length: 3:32
- Label: Arista Nashville
- Songwriters: Tia Sillers; Wayland Patton
- Producers: Billy Joe Walker Jr.; Pam Tillis

Pam Tillis singles chronology
"All the Good Ones Are Gone" (1997)	"Land of the Living" (1997)	"I Said a Prayer" (1998)

"Land of the Living" is a song written by Tia Sillers and Wayland Patton. It was initially recorded by singer-songwriter Helen Darling for her second studio album West of Yesterday, which was cancelled following her getting dropped by Decca Nashville Records. It was then recorded by American country music artist Pam Tillis for her Greatest Hits compilation album, one of two new tracks for the collection. It was released on August 25, 1997, as the second and final single from the album via Arista Nashville.

The track hit number five on the US Billboard Hot Country Songs chart, becoming Tillis's thirteenth and to date, final top ten hit on the chart. "Land of the Living" would later receive a BMI award for being one of the most performed tracks of the year.

== Content ==
According to the sheet music published on Musicnotes.com, "Land of the Living" is performed in the key of E major with a metronome of 104. The song lyrically is about the protagonist dealing with the aftermath of a failed relationship.

== Critical reception ==
Deborah Evans Price of Billboard magazine critically praised the song, saying that "it ranks right up there with the no-hold-barred observations found in such previous hits as "Spilled Perfume", "Let That Pony Run", and "All the Good Ones Are Gone"" and that it "should find favorable reaction from programmers and fans alike." Sean Ross of Billboard's Airplay Monitor named it the eighth best song of 1997.

== Chart performance ==
"Land of the Living" debuted at number 62 on the US Billboard Hot Country Singles & Tracks chart the week of September 6, 1997, becoming the third highest-debut of the week. It entered the top-ten of the chart the week of November 29, 1997, at number eight. It would reach its peak of number five on December 13, 1997, spending two consecutive weeks in the position. It charted for 21 weeks, becoming Tillis's second longest charting single behind her 2000 single "Please", which spent 22 weeks. It is her 13th and to date, final top ten single.

== Personnel ==
Taken from the Greatest Hits booklet.

- Lonnie Wilson – drums
- Glenn Worf – bass guitar
- Richard Bennett and Billy Joe Walker Jr. – acoustic guitar
- Richard Bennett, Larry Byrom, and Billy Joe Walker Jr. – electric guitar
- John Jarvis – keyboards
- Steve Nathan – synthesizer
- Stuart Duncan – fiddle
- Sonny Garrish – steel guitar
- Melissa Britt, Cindy Walker, and Harry Stinson – background vocals

== Charts ==
=== Weekly charts ===
Weekly chart performance for "Land of the Living"
Chart (1997)	Peak position
Canada Country Singles (RPM)	16
US Hot Country Songs (Billboard)	5
US Gavin Country (Gavin Report)	5
US Country Top 50 (Radio & Records)	4

=== Year-end charts ===
1997 year-end chart performance for "Land of the Living"
Chart (1997)	Position
US Hot Country Singles & Tracks (Billboard)	100
US Country (Radio & Records)	67

1998 year-end chart performance for "Land of the Living"
Chart (1998)	Position
US Hot Country Singles & Tracks (Billboard)	95
