= Put Yourself in My Place =

Put Yourself in My Place may refer to:

- Put Yourself in My Place (album), by Pam Tillis, 1991
  - "Put Yourself in My Place" (Pam Tillis song), the title song
- "Put Yourself in My Place" (Kylie Minogue song), 1994
- "Put Yourself in My Place" (Motown song), recorded by four Motown acts 1965–1966
- "Put Yourself in My Place", a song by the Hollies from Hollies, 1965
