= Let There Be Country =

Studio album by Marty Stuart
- Released: August 1992
- Recorded: 1987
- Genre: Country
- Label: Columbia
- Producer: David R. Ferguson (uncredited); Marty Stuart

Marty Stuart chronology
This One's Gonna Hurt You (1992)	Let There Be Country (1992)	Love and Luck (1994)

Let There Be Country is the seventh studio album by country singer Marty Stuart, released in 1992, though it was technically the fourth album he recorded, cut between his self-titled album and Hillbilly Rock.

Let There Be Country was recorded in 1987, but Columbia Records refused to release it. When Stuart later gained a larger following and became increasingly popular after the releases of Hillbilly Rock and Tempted under MCA Records, Columbia then saw fit to release this album in 1992.

The track "I'll Love You Forever (If I Want To)" was later recorded as "Don't Tell Me What to Do" by Pam Tillis on her 1991 album Put Yourself in My Place.

== Track listing ==
No.	Title	Writer(s)	Length
1.	"Let There Be Country"	Marty Stuart	2:59
2.	"Mirrors Don't Lie"	Merle Haggard	3:20
3.	"Matches"	Keith Stegall, Charlie Craig	2:58
4.	"Last Train Done Gone Down"	Peter Rowan	3:09
5.	"Be Careful Who You Love (Arthur's Song)"	Harlan Howard	4:14
6.	"Old Hat"	Marty Stuart	2:32
7.	"Get Down on Your Knees And Pray"	Bill Monroe	3:51
8.	"I'm a One-Woman Man"	Tillman Franks, Johnny Horton	2:16
9.	"Stone Blind"	Max D. Barnes	3:28
10.	"I'll Love You Forever (If I Want To)"	Harlan Howard, Max D. Barnes	3:10

== Personnel ==
- Curtis Allen – guitar
- Flip Anderson – guitar, keyboards, piano, background vocals
- Jack Clement – guitar
- Vassar Clements – fiddle
- T. Michael Coleman – bass
- Stuart Duncan – fiddle
- Emmylou Harris – background vocals
- Warren Haynes – slide guitar
- Jim Hill – bass
- W.S. Holland – drums
- Roy Huskey Jr. – bass
- Kenny Malone – percussion
- Jody Maphis – drums, guitar
- Ralph Mooney – steel guitar
- Mark O'Connor – fiddle
- Alan O'Bryant – background vocals
- Melissa June Prewitt – background vocals
- Mike Rojas – keyboards, piano
- Gove Scrivernor – slide guitar
- Paco Shipp – harmonica
- Marty Stuart – guitar, mandolin, lead vocals
- John Sturdivant – drums
- J.D. Sumner – background vocals
- Barry Tashian – background vocals
- Leon Watson – bass
- Roland White – mandolin
