= Rhinestone (disambiguation) =

A rhinestone is a diamond simulant made from rock crystal, glass or acrylic.

Rhinestone may also refer to:

- Rhinestone (film), a 1984 comedy starring Sylvester Stallone and Dolly Parton
- Rhinestone (film soundtrack), a soundtrack album from the film
- Rhinestone Doozer, a fictional character in the TV series Fraggle Rock
- "Rhinestone", a song by Sort Sol from Snakecharmer
- "Rhinestone", a song by Linkin Park (when they were known as Xero), which would be altered to become the song "Forgotten".

== See also ==
- RhineStoned, a 2007 album by Pam Tillis
- "Rhinestone Cowboy" (1974), a popular song
