= Romeo (Dolly Parton song) =

Single by Dolly Parton and Friends

from the album Slow Dancing with the Moon
- Released: January 25, 1993
- Genre: Country
- Length: 3:34
- Label: Columbia/TriStar
- Songwriter: Dolly Parton
- Producers: Steve Buckingham, Dolly Parton

Dolly Parton singles chronology
"Burning" (1992)	"Romeo" (1993)	"More Where That Came From" (1993)

Mary Chapin Carpenter singles chronology
"Passionate Kisses" (1993)	"Romeo" (1993)	"The Hard Way" (1993)

Pam Tillis singles chronology
"Let That Pony Run" (1993)	"Romeo" (1993)	"Cleopatra, Queen of Denial" (1993)

Billy Ray Cyrus singles chronology
"She's Not Cryin' Anymore" (1993)	"Romeo" (1993)	"In the Heart of a Woman" (1993)

Kathy Mattea singles chronology
"Standing Knee Deep in a River (Dying of Thirst)" (1993)	"Romeo" (1993)	"Seeds" (1993)

Tanya Tucker singles chronology
"It's a Little Too Late" (1993)	"Romeo" (1993)	"Tell Me About It" (1993)

"Romeo" is a song written and recorded by American country music artist Dolly Parton. The song featured fellow country music artists Mary Chapin Carpenter, Pam Tillis, Billy Ray Cyrus, Kathy Mattea, and Tanya Tucker. It was released in January 1993 by Columbia/TriStar as the first single from Parton's thirty-second solo studio album, Slow Dancing with the Moon (1993). The song reached number 27 on the US Billboard Hot Country Singles & Tracks chart. The song was nominated for the Grammy Award for Best Country Collaboration with Vocals.

Artist and writer proceeds from the sale of the single were donated to the American Red Cross. Stone Phillips of The Today Show mentioned during an interview with Dolly at the time, that she was writing the song when Hurricane Andrew tore into south Florida.

The music video was shot in black and white and featured all of the artists that sang on the track, with the exception of Pam Tillis, who was unavailable for the video shoot.

== Content ==
People Magazine described the song as featuring Cyrus "as a growling male sex object who is subjected to leering catcalls by Dolly and sidekicks...This equal-opportunity misbehavior is the most memorable thing about 'Romeo.'"

== Charts ==
Chart (1993)	Peak position
US Billboard Hot 100	50
US Hot Country Songs (Billboard)	27
US Cash Box Top 100	66
