= Every Time (Pam Tillis song) =

Single by Pam Tillis

from the album Every Time
- B-side: "You Put the Lonely on Me"
- Released: September 12, 1998
- Genre: Country
- Length: 3:43
- Label: Arista Nashville
- Songwriters: Jennifer Kimball, Tommy Lee James
- Producers: Billy Joe Walker Jr., Pam Tillis

Pam Tillis singles chronology
"I Said a Prayer" (1998)	"Every Time" (1998)	"After a Kiss" (1999)

"Every Time" is a song recorded by American country music artist Pam Tillis. It was released in September 1998 as the second single and title track from the album Every Time. The song reached #38 on the Billboard Hot Country Singles & Tracks chart. The song was written by Jennifer Kimball and Tommy Lee James.

== Chart performance ==
Chart (1998)	Peak position
US Hot Country Songs (Billboard)	38
Canadian RPM Country Tracks	50
