= Slow Dancing with the Moon =

Studio album by Dolly Parton
- Released: February 23, 1993
- Recorded: c. October 1992
- Genre: Country
- Length: 40:18
- Label: Columbia
- Producers: Steve Buckingham, Dolly Parton

Dolly Parton chronology
Straight Talk (1992)	Slow Dancing with the Moon (1993)	Honky Tonk Angels (1993)

Singles from Slow Dancing with the Moon
- 1. "Romeo" Released: January 25, 1993; 2. "More Where That Came From" Released: April 19, 1993; 3. "Full Circle" Released: June 21, 1993

Professional ratings
Review scores
Source	Rating
AllMusic	2.5/5 stars
Robert Christgau	(dud)
The Encyclopedia of Popular Music	3/5 stars
Music Week	3/5 stars

Slow Dancing with the Moon is the thirty-second solo studio album by American entertainer Dolly Parton. It was released on February 23, 1993. The album features a number of famous guest artists, including Collin Raye, Mary Chapin Carpenter, Kathy Mattea, Tanya Tucker, Maura O'Connell, Billy Dean, Pam Tillis, Marty Stuart and Billy Ray Cyrus. The album released three singles, "Romeo" (top 30), "More Where That Came From" (which did not make the top 40), and "Full Circle" (which did not chart). Despite the singles' lackluster chart performance, however, the album itself was well-received critically, and reached number 4 on the U.S. country albums charts – where it spent 35 weeks – and number 16 on the pop albums charts. It ended up being certified Platinum by the Recording Industry Association of America.

Composed mostly of Parton's own songs, the album also contained a cover of Jackie DeShannon's "Put a Little Love in Your Heart". The song "More Where That Came From" appeared in a 1993 episode of Beavis and Butt-Head and was used in a 2008 commercial for Target. The song "What Will Baby Be" was a re-recorded version of her 1973 song however the original version was not released until her Dolly box set album in 2009. In 2009, Sony Music reissued Slow Dancing with the Moon in a triple-feature CD set with Eagle When She Flies and White Limozeen.

== Track listing ==
All tracks are written by Dolly Parton except as noted.

No.	Title	Writer(s)	Length
1.	"Full Circle"	Dolly Parton, Mac Davis	3:56
2.	"Romeo" (with Mary Chapin Carpenter, Pam Tillis, Billy Ray Cyrus, Kathy Mattea, and Tanya Tucker)		3:34
3.	"(You Got Me Over) A Heartache Tonight" (with Billy Dean)	Dolly Parton, Larry Weiss	3:04
4.	"What Will Baby Be"		3:24
5.	"More Where That Came From"		3:14
6.	"Put a Little Love in Your Heart"	Jackie DeShannon, Jimmy Holliday, Randy Myers	2:27
7.	"Why Can't We?"	Chuck Cannon, Austin Cunningham, Allen Shamblin	3:48
8.	"I'll Make Your Bed"		3:17
9.	"Whenever Forever Comes" (with Collin Raye)		3:26
10.	"Cross My Heart"	Rachel Dennison, Frank Dycus, Randy Parton	3:31
11.	"Slow Dancing with the Moon"	Mac Davis	3:28
12.	"High and Mighty"		3:09
Total length:			40:18

== Charts ==
Weekly charts

Chart (1993)	Peak position
Australia (ARIA Charts)	137
Canadian RPM Country Albums	7
UK Country Albums Chart (Music Week)	1
U.S. Billboard Top Country Albums	4
U.S. Billboard 200	16
US Cashbox Country Albums	3
US Cash Box Top Albums	16

Year-end charts

Chart (1993)	Position
US Top Country Albums (Billboard)	29

== Certifications ==
Certifications for "Slow Dancing with the Moon"
Region	Certification	Certified units/sales
Canada (Music Canada)	Gold	50,000^{^}
United States (RIAA)	Platinum	1,000,000^{^}
^{^} Shipments figures based on certification alone.
