= Thunder & Roses =

Studio album by Pam Tillis
- Released: March 6, 2001
- Studios: Emerald Entertainment, Emerald Sound Studios, Seventeen Grand Recording, The Money Pit, Ken's Gold Club, Quad Studios, The Parlor, Javelina Studios, Starstruck Studios, Sound Stage Studios and Loud Recording (Nashville, Tennessee)
- Genre: Country
- Length: 47:02
- Label: Arista Nashville
- Producers: Paul Worley; Dann Huff; Kenny Greenberg; Billy Joe Walker Jr.

Pam Tillis chronology
Every Time (1998)	Thunder & Roses (2001)	It's All Relative: Tillis Sings Tillis (2002)

Singles from Thunder & Roses
- 1. "Please" Released: December 4, 2000; 2. "Thunder & Roses" Released: May 21, 2001

Professional ratings
Review scores
Source	Rating
AllMusic	3/5 stars

Thunder & Roses is the seventh studio album by American country music artist Pam Tillis. It was released on March 6, 2001, by Arista Nashville. It is also the last album she recorded for the Arista label. Its lead-off single, "Please", was a #22 hit on the Billboard Hot Country Songs charts in 2002. "It Isn't Just Raining" was later recorded in 2003 by its co-writer, Jennifer Hanson, on her self-titled debut album, and the title track was previously recorded by Mindy McCready on her 1999 album I'm Not So Tough. "Please" would go on to be Pam's last appearance on the Country Singles Chart after it peaked in spring of 2001.

== Track listing ==
Thunder & Roses track listing
No.	Title	Writer(s)	Length
1.	"Jagged Hearts"	Stephanie Bentley; Chris Lindsey	4:29
2.	"Space"	Devon O'Day; Kim Patton-Johnston	3:29
3.	"It Isn't Just Raining"	Mark Nesler; Jennifer Hanson; Tony Martin	3:49
4.	"Please"	John Hobbs; Michael Dulaney; Jeffrey Steele	3:31
5.	"Tryin'"	Brett James; Troy Verges	3:54
6.	"Thunder and Roses"	Lindsey; Aimee Mayo; Marv Green	3:40
7.	"Which Five Years"	Craig Wiseman; Lisa Drew	4:00
8.	"Be a Man"	Chuck Jones; Steele	4:08
9.	"Off-White"	Pam Tillis; Kim Tribble; Tammy Hyler	4:10
10.	"I Smile"	Leonard Ahlstrom; Russ Lee; Eddie Carswell	3:54
11.	"If I Didn't Love You"	Tina Arena; Pam Reswick; Steve Werfel	4:17
12.	"Waiting on the Wind" (duet with Mel Tillis)	Tony Haselden	3:41
Total length:			47:02

== Personnel ==
- Pam Tillis – vocals
- Tim Akers – keyboards
- Pat Coil – acoustic piano, synthesizers
- John Hobbs – acoustic piano, Hammond B3 organ, synthesizers
- Steve Nathan – keyboards, acoustic piano, Hammond B3 organ, synthesizers, synth strings
- Kenny Greenberg – electric guitars
- David Grissom – electric guitars
- Dann Huff – electric guitars
- John Jorgenson – acoustic guitars, electric guitars
- Jeff King – electric guitars
- B. James Lowry – acoustic guitars
- Brent Mason – electric guitars
- Jerry McPherson – electric guitars
- Billy Joe Walker Jr. – acoustic guitars, electric guitars
- Biff Watson – acoustic guitars
- Paul Worley – acoustic guitars
- Randy Scruggs – banjo
- Jerry Douglas – dobro
- Dan Dugmore – steel guitar
- Paul Franklin – steel guitar, pedabro
- Russ Pahl – steel guitar
- Scotty Sanders – steel guitar
- Mike Brignardello – bass
- Michael Rhodes – bass
- Glenn Worf – bass
- Chad Cromwell – drums
- Paul Leim – drums, percussion, drum programming
- Greg Morrow – drums
- Eric Darken – percussion
- Terry McMillan – percussion
- Larry Franklin – fiddle
- Jonathan Yudkin – fiddle, mandolin
- David Angell – violin
- Janet Askey – violin
- Carolyn Bailey – violin
- David Davidson – violin
- Carl Gorodetzky – violin
- Gerald Greer – violin
- Lee Larrison – violin
- Cate Myer – violin
- Pamela Sixfin – violin
- Alan Umstead – violin
- Cathy Umstead – violin
- Mary Kathryn Vanosdale – violin
- Karen Winkleman – string arrangements
- Mike Casteel – copyist
- Lisa Cochran – backing vocals
- Thom Flora – backing vocals
- Vince Gill – backing vocals
- Adie Gray – backing vocals
- Wes Hightower – backing vocals
- Joanna Janet – backing vocals
- Liana Manis – backing vocals
- Chris Rodriguez – backing vocals
- Lisa Silver – backing vocals
- Jeffrey Steele – backing vocals
- Harry Stinson – backing vocals
- Curtis Young – backing vocals
- Mel Tillis – vocals (12)

== Production ==
- Kenny Greenberg – producer (1, 6, 12)
- Paul Worley – producer (2, 9)
- Billy Joe Walker Jr. – producer (3, 4, 7, 8, 10, 11)
- Dann Huff – producer (5)
- Kelly Giedt – production coordinator (1, 6, 12)
- Paige Connors – project coordinator (2, 9)
- Burton Brooks – production coordinator (3, 4, 7, 8, 10, 11)
- Ginny Johnson – production coordinator (3, 4, 7, 8, 10, 11)
- Reese Faw – production coordinator (3, 4, 7, 8, 10, 11)
- Mike "Frog" Griffith – production coordinator (5)
- Beth Lee – art direction, design
- Andrew Eccles – photography
- Terri Apanasewicz – hair stylist, make-up

Technical

- Ken Love – mastering (1, 2, 5, 6, 9, 12) at MasterMix (Nashville, Tennessee)
- Benny Quinn – mastering (3, 4, 7, 8, 10, 11) at Masterdisk (New York City, New York)
- Justin Niebank – recording (1, 6, 12), mixing (1, 6, 12),
- Clarke Schleicher – recording (2, 9), mixing (2, 9)
- Julian King – recording (3, 4, 7, 8, 10, 11)
- Chuck Ainlay – mixing (3, 4, 7, 8, 10, 11)
- Jeff Balding – recording (5), mixing (5)
- Mills Logan – additional recording (1, 6, 12)
- Erik Hellerman – additional recording (2, 9), recording assistant (2, 9), digital editing
- Mike Poole – additional recording (2, 9)
- Sandy Williams – additional recording (2, 9), recording assistant (2, 9)
- Tony Green – additional recording (3, 4, 7, 8, 10, 11), mix assistant (3, 4, 7, 8, 10, 11)
- Chris Stone – additional recording (3, 4, 7, 8, 10, 11)
- Steve Tillisch – additional recording (3, 4, 7, 8, 10, 11)
- Mark Hagen – additional recording (5), recording assistant (5)
- Warren Peterson – recording assistant (1, 6)
- Wade Hachler – recording assistant (2, 9)
- Rich Hanson – mix assistant (2, 9)
- Ricky Cobble – recording assistant (3, 4, 7, 8, 10, 11)
- Doug Delong – mix assistant (3, 4, 7, 8, 10, 11)
- Eric Bickel – recording assistant (5)
- J.R. Rodriguez – recording assistant (12)
- Kent Hertz – mix assistant (12)

== Charts ==
Chart (2001)	Peak position
US Billboard 200	184
US Top Country Albums (Billboard)	24
