= Blue Rose Is =

Single by Pam Tillis

from the album Put Yourself
- B-side: "Ancient History"
- Released: April 11, 1992
- Genre: Country
- Length: 3:41
- Label: Arista
- Songwriter(s): Pam Tillis, Bob DiPiero, Jan Buckingham
- Producer(s): Paul Worley, Ed Seay

Pam Tillis singles chronology
"Maybe It Was Memphis" (1991)	"Blue Rose Is" (1992)	"Shake the Sugar Tree" (1992)

"Blue Rose Is" is a song co-written and recorded by American country music artist Pam Tillis. It was released in April 1992 as the fifth single from the 1991 album Put Yourself in My Place. The song reached No. 21 on the Billboard Hot Country Singles & Tracks chart. The song was written by Tillis, Bob DiPiero and Jan Buckingham.

== Chart performance ==
Chart (1992)	Peak position
US Hot Country Songs (Billboard)	21
Canadian RPM Country Tracks	24
