= It's All Relative: Tillis Sings Tillis =

Studio album by Pam Tillis
- Released: September 3, 2002
- Studio: Sound Emporium Studios, Sound Stage Studios, The Fiddle House and Mystic Studios (Nashville, Tennessee); Bismeaux Studios (Austin, Texas); Mel Tillis Studio (Branson, Missouri)
- Genre: Country
- Length: 46:33
- Label: Epic/Lucky Dog
- Producer: Ray Benson; Pam Tillis

Pam Tillis chronology
Thunder & Roses (2001)	It's All Relative: Tillis Sings Tillis (2002)	RhineStoned (2007)

Professional ratings
Review scores
Source	Rating
AllMusic	4/5 stars

It's All Relative: Tillis Sings Tillis is an album by American country music artist Pam Tillis, released in 2002. All of the songs were written or co-written by her father, country singer Mel Tillis. All are covers of songs that were originally by other artists.

== Track listing ==
1. "Burning Memories" (Mel Tillis, Wayne Walker) – 3:06
2. "So Wrong" (Carl Perkins, Danny Dill, Tillis) – 3:19
3. "Unmitigated Gall" (Tillis) – 3:00
4. "Violet and a Rose" (Thresa Auge, John Reinfeld, Little Jimmy Dickens, Tillis) – 3:54
5. "I Ain't Never" (Tillis, Webb Pierce) – 2:33
6. "Not Lke It Was With You" (Tillis) – 3:27
7. "Mental Revenge" (Tillis) – 4:05
8. "Heart Over Mind" (Tillis) – 6:12
9. "Goodbye Wheeling" (Tillis) – 3:42
10. "Emotions" (Tillis, Ramsey Kearney) – 3:26
11. "Honey (Open That Door)" (Tillis) – 2:52
12. "Detroit City" (Tillis, Dill) – 4:09
13. "Come On and Sing" (Tillis) – 2:48

== Personnel ==
Musicians

- Pam Tillis – vocals, guitars
- Beegie Adair – acoustic piano, keyboards
- Floyd Domino – acoustic piano, keyboards
- Tony Harrell – acoustic piano, keyboards
- Bob Patin – acoustic piano, keyboards
- Matt Rollings – acoustic piano, keyboards
- Ray Benson – guitars
- Pat Bergeson – guitars
- Pat Buchanan – guitars, harmonica
- John Jorgenson – guitars
- Joe Manuel – guitars
- James Pennebaker – guitars, mandolin
- Larry Seyer – guitars
- Matt Spicher – guitars
- Bryan Sutton – guitars, mandolin
- Redd Volkaert – guitars
- Marty Stuart – mandolin
- Bruce Bouton – dobro, lap steel guitar, pedal steel guitar
- Dan Dugmore – dobro, lap steel guitar, pedal steel guitar
- Lloyd Maines – dobro, lap steel guitar, pedal steel guitar
- Jim Murphy – dobro, lap steel guitar, pedal steel guitar
- Robby Turner – dobro, lap steel guitar, pedal steel guitar
- Mike Brignardello – electric bass, upright bass
- Steve Mackey – electric bass, upright bass
- Kevin Smith – electric bass, upright bass
- David Spicher – electric bass, upright bass
- Spencer Starnes – electric bass, upright bass
- Greg Morrow – drums, percussion
- Rich Redmond – drums, percussion
- David Sanger – drums, percussion
- Jim White – drums, percussion
- Lynn Williams – drums, percussion
- Will Smith – autoharp
- Delbert McClinton – harmonica
- Aubrey Haynie – fiddle
- Jason Roberts – fiddle
- David Angell – strings
- John Catchings – strings
- David Davidson – strings
- Buddy Spicher – strings, string arrangements

Backing vocalists

- Lona Heins
- Connie Howden
- Madison Howden
- Marshall Howden
- Marc McCauley
- Carrie Tillis Presley
- Cindy Tillis Westmoreland
- Pam Tillis
- Sonny Tillis
- Katherine Westmoreland
- Tanner Westmoreland

Guest vocalists

- Ray Benson (11)
- Emmylou Harris
- Delbert McClinton
- Louis Nunley
- Dolly Parton (4)
- Gordon Stoker
- Marty Stuart
- Mel Tillis
- Rhonda Vincent
- Ray Walker
- Trisha Yearwood
- Curtis Young

== Production ==
- Cliff Audretch – A&R direction
- Pam Tillis – producer, liner notes
- Ray Benson – producer (1, 2, 5, 11)
- Cris Burns – recording
- Neal Cappellino – recording
- Jamie Carter – recording
- Rodney Dawson – recording
- Mills Logan – recording
- Matt Spicher – recording
- Tony Green – second engineer
- Erick Jaskowiak – second engineer
- Larry Seyer – second engineer
- David Spicher – second engineer
- Ed Seay – mixing at Cool Tools Audio (Nashville, Tennessee)
- Ken Love – mastering at MasterMix (Nashville, Tennessee)
- Michael Hiatt – A&R coordinator
- Kay Smith – A&R coordinator
- Victoria Russell – creative production
- Tracy Baskette-Fleaner – art direction, design
- Deb Haus – art direction, artist development
- Russ Harrington – photography
- Karen Williams Johnston – photography
- Renee Layher – stylist
- Paula Jehle-Turner – hair, make-up
