= Above and Beyond the Doll of Cutey =

Studio album by Pam Tillis
- Released: 1983
- Genre: Pop
- Label: Warner Bros. Nashville
- Producer: Jolly Hills Productions, Dixie Gamble-Bowen

Pam Tillis chronology
Above and Beyond the Doll of Cutey (1983)	Put Yourself in My Place (1991)

Singles from Above and Beyond the Doll of Cutey
- 1. "Killer Comfort" Released: 1983; 2. "Love Is Sneakin' Up on You" Released: 1983

Above and Beyond the Doll of Cutey is the debut studio album by American country music singer Pam Tillis. Released in 1983 as her only album for Warner Bros. Records, it features the singles "Killer Comfort" and "Love Is Sneakin' Up on You". The album was more pop oriented in comparison to her work on Arista Nashville.

== Track listing ==
Side one

1. "Killer Comfort" (Pam Tillis, Pat Bunch, Pam Rose, Mary Ann Kennedy) – 2:45
2. "Love Is Sneakin' Up on You" (Pam Tillis, Pat Bunch, Doris Tillis) – 2:50
3. "Make It Feel Better" (Pam Tillis, Pat Bunch, Peter Wood) – 3:23
4. "Wish I Was in Love Tonight" (Pam Tillis, Peter Wood, Callie Khouri) – 3:16
5. "You Don't Miss" (Pam Tillis, Steve Goldstein) – 3:09

Side two

6. "Never Be the Same" (Pam Tillis, Fred Koller) – 4:01
7. "(You Just Want to Be) Weird" (Pam Tillis, Bill Lamb) – 2:30
8. "Popular Girl" (Pam Tillis, Mel Tillis Jr., Callie Khouri) – 2:16
9. "It Ain't Easy Bein' Easy" (Mark Gray, Shawna Harrington, Les Taylor) – 4:04
10. "Let's Get Crazy" (Pam Tillis, Peter Wood) – 3:32

== Personnel ==
Adapted from Above and Beyond the Doll of Cutey liner notes.

Musicians

- Pam Tillis – vocals
- Steve Goldstein – keyboards
- Peter Wood – keyboards
- Craig Hull – guitars; vocals
- Josh Leo – guitars
- Bryan Garofalo – bass
- Craig Krampf – drums; percussion
- M. L. Benoit – percussion
- Jim Horn – horns
- Chuck Findley – horns
- Gary Grant – horns
- Jerry Hey – horns
- Doug Clement – vocals
- Bill Lamb – vocals
- Daniel Moore – vocals
- Donna Rhodes – vocals
- Harry Stinson – vocals
- Wendy Waldman – vocals

=== Production ===
- Dixie Gamble-Bowen – producer
- Jolly Hills Productions (Steve Goldstein, Craig Hull, Craig Krampf, Bryan Garofalo, Josh Leo) – producers
- Niko Bolas – engineer
- Steve Tillisch – engineer
- Tim Kish – second engineer
- Wayne "Duck" Tanouge – second engineer
- Steve Hall – mastering at Future Disc (Hollywood, California)
- Simon Levy – art direction
- Jeri McManus – design
- Jim Shea – photography
- Angelo DiBiase – make-up
