= Shake the Sugar Tree =

Single by Pam Tillis

from the album Homeward Looking Angel
- B-side: "Maybe It Was Memphis"
- Released: August 22, 1992
- Recorded: 1992
- Genre: Country
- Length: 3:08
- Label: Arista
- Songwriter: Chapin Hartford
- Producers: Paul Worley, Ed Seay

Pam Tillis singles chronology
"Blue Rose Is" (1992)	"Shake the Sugar Tree" (1992)	"Let That Pony Run" (1993)

"Shake the Sugar Tree" is a song written by Chapin Hartford, and recorded by American country music singer Pam Tillis. It was released in August 1992 as the lead-off single from her album Homeward Looking Angel. "Shake the Sugar Tree" became Tillis' fourth Top Ten country hit, peaking at number 3 on Billboard Hot Country Singles & Tracks (now Hot Country Songs).

== Content ==
In the song, a wife admonishes her husband for taking her and their relationship for granted too often, only responding when she threatens to leave ("You're like fruit from a fickle vine, you turn sweet in the nick of time / Love, you only come alive when you're losin' me") and concluding that sometimes she has to "shake the sugar tree" (provoke him) in order to "feel his love come falling all around [her]".

Singer-songwriter Stephanie Bentley sang the demo version of the song, and Tillis' producer, Paul Worley, incorporated Bentley's demo vocals as harmony vocals in the final recording.

== Personnel ==
Compiled from liner notes.

- Stephanie Bentley – backing vocals
- Dennis Burnside – organ
- Bill Hullett – acoustic and electric guitars, mandolin
- Anthony Martin – piano
- Larry Paxton – bass guitar
- Blaine Sprouce – fiddle
- Pam Tillis – lead and backing vocals
- Lonnie Wilson – drums
- Paul Worley – acoustic guitar

== Critical reception ==
Roch Parisien and Thom Jurek, who reviewed Homeward Looking Angel for Allmusic, cited the song as a standout on the album, calling it "sultry and sexy."

== Chart positions ==
Chart (1992)	Peak position
Canada Country Singles (RPM)	3
US Hot Country Songs (Billboard)	3

=== Year-end charts ===
Chart (1992)	Position
Canada Country Tracks (RPM)	42
