= I Said a Prayer =

Single by Pam Tillis

from the album Every Time
- B-side: "Lay the Heartache Down"
- Released: May 16, 1998
- Genre: Country
- Length: 2:57
- Label: Arista Nashville
- Songwriter: Leslie Satcher
- Producers: Billy Joe Walker Jr., Pam Tillis

Pam Tillis singles chronology
| "Land of the Living" (1997) | "I Said a Prayer" (1998) | "Every Time" (1998) |

"I Said a Prayer" is a song written by Leslie Satcher, and recorded by American country music artist Pam Tillis. It was released in May 1998 as the first single from the album Every Time. The song reached #12 on the Billboard Hot Country Singles & Tracks chart.

== Chart performance ==
| Chart (1998) | Peak position |
|---|---|
| Canada Country Singles (RPM) | 7 |
| US Bubbling Under Hot 100 (Billboard) | 2 |
| US Hot Country Songs (Billboard) | 12 |

=== Year-end charts ===
| Chart (1998) | Position |
|---|---|
| Canada Country Tracks (RPM) | 66 |
| US Country Songs (Billboard) | 67 |
