= Just in Time for Christmas =

Studio album by Pam Tillis
- Released: November 13, 2007
- Genre: Country
- Length: 36:30
- Label: Stellar Cat
- Producer: Matt Spicher, Pam Tillis

Pam Tillis chronology
| RhineStoned (2007) | Just in Time for Christmas (2007) | Dos Divas (2013) |

Just in Time for Christmas is the tenth studio album and first Christmas album recorded by country music artist Pam Tillis. The album was released on November 13, 2007, on Tillis' own Stellar Cat Records and distributed by RED Distribution. The album features seven of Tillis' favorite Christmas songs, along with three new compositions. "The Rockin' Christmas Medley" is a duet with Tillis' father Mel Tillis. The album also features background vocals from Tillis' nieces and nephews. The album was recorded and first released independently in 2005.

== Reception ==
Professional ratings
Review scores
| Source | Rating |
|---|---|
| About.com | 5/5 stars |

Reception for the album was mostly positive. About.com gave the album five stars, stating that "Tillis has a voice like no other and she can draw you into the mood with very little effort." The North County Times gave the album an A− rating, saying that "Tillis' warm yet feathery voice lends new charm to old favorites." The Omaha World-Herald rated the album B+, praising the new tracks as being "especially to-die-for." While the Westword says the album "underwhelms," The Post-Star calls this album "the most intriguing offering" among 2007's country music Christmas releases.

== Track listing ==
1. "Have Yourself a Merry Little Christmas" (Ralph Blane, Hugh Martin) - 4:32
2. "Beautiful Night" (Julie Lee Still) - 3:16
3. "Light of the World" (Richard Leigh, Gary Nicholson) - 3:32
4. "The Christmas Waltz" (Sammy Cahn, Jule Styne) - 3:01
5. "New Year's Eve" (Frank Loesser) - 4:12
6. "The Rockin' Christmas Medley" (Joe Beal, Jim Boothe, Johnny Marks) - 2:45
  - duet w/ Mel Tillis
7. "Pretty Paper" (Willie Nelson) - 2:55
8. "Silent Night Medley" (Franz Gruber, William J. Kirkpatrick, Josef Mohr, James R. Murray, John Jacob Niles) - 4:37
9. "Seasons" (Viktor Krauss, Karyn Rochelle) - 3:22
10. "I'll Be Home for Christmas" (Kim Gannon, Walter Kent, Buck Ram) - 4:18

== Personnel ==
- Eddie Bayers - drums, percussion
- Sandra Dudley - background vocals
- Stuart Duncan - fiddle
- Jana King Evans - vocal arrangements, background vocals
- Darin Favorite - acoustic guitar
- Rudy Gatlin - background vocals
- Steve Gatlin - background vocals
- Jeff Hall - vocal arrangements, background vocals
- R. Harrell - background vocals
- Lona Heins - background vocals
- Julie Lee - background vocals
- Brent Mason - electric guitar, gut string guitar
- Bob Patin - string arrangements, piano, strings
- Mel Tillis - vocals on "The Rockin' Christmas Medley"
- Pam Tillis - lead vocals, background vocals
- Biff Watson - acoustic guitar
- Tommy White - dobro, pedal steel guitar
