= Every Time (album) =

Studio album by Pam Tillis
- Released: June 30, 1998
- Studio: Emerald Sound Studios, Our Place Studio, Woodland Studios and Sound Emporium (Nashville, Tennessee)
- Genre: Country
- Length: 37:19
- Label: Arista Nashville
- Producer: Billy Joe Walker Jr.; Pam Tillis; Chris Farren

Pam Tillis chronology
| Greatest Hits (1997) | Every Time (1998) | Thunder & Roses (2001) |

Singles from Every Time
- 1. "I Said a Prayer" Released: May 4, 1998; 2. "Every Time" Released: August 31, 1998

Professional ratings
Review scores
| Source | Rating |
|---|---|
| AllMusic | 4/5 stars |

Every Time is the sixth studio album by American country music artist Pam Tillis. It was released on June 30, 1998, by Arista Nashville. The album peaked No. 26 on the Billboard country albums charts. Singles from the album were "I Said a Prayer" and the title track, which peaked at No. 12 and No. 38 on Hot Country Songs in 1998. "A Great Disguise" was previously recorded by Martina McBride on her 1995 album Wild Angels.

== Track listing ==
Every Time track listing
| No. | Title | Writer(s) | Length |
|---|---|---|---|
| 1. | "I Said a Prayer" | Leslie Satcher | 2:56 |
| 2. | "Every Time" | Tommy Lee James; Jennifer Kimball | 3:43 |
| 3. | "You Put the Lonely on Me" | Satcher | 2:32 |
| 4. | "A Whisper and a Scream" | Austin Cunningham; Verlon Thompson | 2:56 |
| 5. | "Lay the Heartache Down" | Jamie O'Hara | 3:26 |
| 6. | "Hurt Myself" | Savannah Snow | 3:39 |
| 7. | "Not Me" | Cathy Majeski; Sunny Russ; Stephony Smith | 3:51 |
| 8. | "Whiskey on the Wound" | Satcher | 3:20 |
| 9. | "We Must Be Thinking Alike" | Chris Farren; Chuck Jones | 3:18 |
| 10. | "After Hours" | Suzi Ragsdale; Thompson | 3:40 |
| 11. | "A Great Disguise" | Greg Barnhill; Hillary Kanter; Even Stevens | 3:58 |
| Total length: | | | 37:19 |

== Personnel ==
- Pam Tillis – lead vocals, backing vocals (1–8, 10, 11)
- John Barlow Jarvis – acoustic piano (1–8, 10, 11)
- Steve Nathan – Hammond B3 organ (1–8, 10, 11), synthesizers (1–8, 10, 11)
- Tony Harrell – accordion (1–8, 10, 11)
- John Hobbs – synthesizers (1–8, 10, 11), acoustic piano (9)
- Richard Bennett – electric guitar (1–8, 10, 11)
- Brent Mason – electric guitar (1–8, 10, 11)
- Brent Rowan – electric guitar (1–8, 10, 11)
- Billy Joe Walker Jr. – acoustic guitar (1–8, 10, 11), electric guitar (1–8, 10, 11), gut string guitar (1–8, 10, 11), lead vocals (9)
- Chris Farren – acoustic guitar (9), mandolin (9), backing vocals (9)
- John Jorgenson – electric guitar (9)
- Steuart Smith – electric guitar (9)
- Biff Watson – acoustic guitar (9)
- Dan Dugmore – dobro (1–8, 10, 11), steel guitar (9)
- Glen Duncan – dobro (1–8, 10, 11)
- Sonny Garrish – steel guitar (1–8, 10, 11)
- Michael Rhodes – bass (1–8, 10, 11)
- Glenn Worf – bass (1–8, 10, 11)
- Joe Chemay – bass (9)
- Eddie Bayers – drums (1–8, 10, 11), percussion (1–8, 10, 11)
- Lonnie Wilson – drums (1–8, 10, 11)
- Greg Morrow – drums (9)
- Kirk "Jelly Roll" Johnson – harmonica (1–8, 10, 11)
- Stuart Duncan – fiddle (1–8, 10, 11)
- Aubrey Haynie – fiddle (1–8, 10, 11)
- Larry Franklin – fiddle (9)
- Beth Nielsen Chapman – backing vocals (1–8, 10, 11)
- Wes Hightower – backing vocals (1–8, 10, 11)
- Carl Jackson – backing vocals (1–8, 10, 11)
- Jamie O'Hara – backing vocals (1–8, 10, 11)
- Suzi Ragsdale – backing vocals (1–8, 10, 11)
- Leslie Satcher – backing vocals (1–8, 10, 11)
- Timothy B. Schmit – backing vocals (1–8, 10, 11)
- Verlon Thompson – backing vocals (1–8, 10, 11)
- Dennis Wilson – backing vocals (1–8, 10, 11)
- John Wesley Ryles – backing vocals (9)

== Production ==
Tracks 1–8, 10 & 11

- Pam Tillis – producer
- Billy Joe Walker Jr. – producer
- Ginny Johnson – production coordinator
- Steve Tillisch – track recording
- Brian Hardin – tracking assistant
- Alan Schulman – overdub recording
- Tyler Gish – overdub assistant
- Steve Lowery – overdub assistant
- Chris Mara – overdub assistant
- Marty McClantoc – overdub assistant
- Chris Stone – overdub assistant
- David Thoener – remixing (1)
- Sam Hewitt – remix assistant (1)
- Glenn Spinner – remix assistant (1)

Track 9

- Pam Tillis – co-producer
- Chris Farren – co-producer
- Tom Harding – overdub recording
- David Thoener – track recording
- Carl Meadows – tracking assistant
- John Thomas – tracking assistant
- Steve Tillisch – vocal recording
- Amy Frigo – vocal recording assistant

Additional credits

- Bill Schnee – mixing at Seventeen Grand Recording (Nashville, Tennessee)
- Sandy Jenkins – mix assistant
- Travis Salsig – mix assistant
- Hank Williams – mastering at MasterMix (Nashville, Tennessee)
- Mark Gilman-Clapham – art direction
- Missy McKeand – design
- Jim "Señior" McGuire – photography
- John Scarpati – photography
- Claudia Fowler – stylist
- Mary Beth Felts – make-up
- Melanie Shelley – make-up
- Moress Nanas Entertainment – management

== Charts ==
| Chart (1998) | Peak position |
|---|---|
| US Top Country Albums (Billboard) | 26 |
