= All the Good Ones Are Gone =

Single by Pam Tillis

from the album Greatest Hits
- B-side: "Land of the Living"
- Released: April 26, 1997
- Genre: Country
- Length: 3:17
- Label: Arista Nashville
- Songwriters: Dean Dillon, Bob McDill
- Producers: Billy Joe Walker Jr., Pam Tillis

Pam Tillis singles chronology
"Betty's Got a Bass Boat" (1997)	"All the Good Ones Are Gone" (1997)	"Land of the Living" (1997)

"All the Good Ones Are Gone" is a song written by Dean Dillon and Bob McDill, and recorded by American country music artist Pam Tillis. It was released in April 1997 as the first single from her Greatest Hits compilation album. The song reached #4 on the Billboard Hot Country Singles & Tracks chart.

== Chart performance ==
Chart (1997)	Peak position
Canada Country Singles (RPM)	4
US Hot Country Songs (Billboard)	4

=== Year-end charts ===
Chart (1997)	Position
Canada Country Tracks (RPM)	50
US Country Songs (Billboard)	28
