= Do You Know Where Your Man Is =

Single by Pam Tillis

from the album Homeward Looking Angel
- B-side: "We've Tried Everything Else"
- Released: August 28, 1993
- Genre: Country
- Length: 3:46
- Label: Arista
- Songwriters: Dave Gibson, Russell Smith, Carol Chase
- Producers: Paul Worley, Ed Seay

Pam Tillis singles chronology
"Cleopatra, Queen of Denial" (1993)	"Do You Know Where Your Man Is" (1993)	"Spilled Perfume" (1994)

"Do You Know Where Your Man Is" is a song written by Dave Gibson, Russell Smith and Carol Chase, and recorded by American country music artist Pam Tillis. It was released in August 1993 as the fourth single from the album Homeward Looking Angel. The song reached number 16 on the Billboard Hot Country Singles & Tracks chart. Barbara Mandrell first recorded the song for her 1990 album Morning Sun. Melba Montgomery made the song the title track of her 1992 studio album on Playback Records.

== Chart performance ==
Chart (1993)	Peak position
Canada Country Singles (RPM)	19
US Hot Country Songs (Billboard)	16
