= RhineStoned =

Studio album by Pam Tillis
- Released: April 17, 2007
- Genre: Country
- Length: 44:52
- Label: Stellar Cat
- Producer: Gary Nicholson, Matt Spicher, Pam Tillis

Pam Tillis chronology
It's All Relative: Tillis Sings Tillis (2002)	RhineStoned (2007)	Just in Time for Christmas (2007)

Professional ratings
Review scores
Source	Rating
Allmusic	4/5 stars

RhineStoned is the ninth studio album recorded by country music artist Pam Tillis. It is her first album for her own Stellar Cat label. The tracks "Band in the Window" and "The Hard Way" were both released as singles, although neither charted.

Kellie Pickler released a cover version of "Someone Somewhere Tonight" in May 2013, and the single peaked a number 49 on the Billboard Country Airplay charts.

== Track listing ==
1. "Something Burning Out" (Leslie Satcher) – 3:25
2. "Band in the Window" (Lisa Brokop, Kim McLean) – 3:28
3. "Train Without a Whistle" (Jon Randall) – 4:27
4. "Life Has Sure Changed Us Around" (Pam Tillis, Gary Nicholson) – 4:18
5. "Someone Somewhere Tonight" (Davis Raines, Walt Wilkins) – 4:52
6. "Down By the Water" (Jim Armenti) – 3:47
7. "Crazy By Myself" (Matraca Berg, Gary Harrison) – 3:20
8. "Bettin' Money on Love" (Verlon Thompson, Doug Crider) – 4:42
9. "That Was a Heartache" (Bruce Robison, Satcher) – 3:41
10. "The Hard Way" (Mel Tillis Jr., P. Tillis) – 4:14
11. "Over My Head" (Andrew Gold, Jenny Yates) – 4:38

== Personnel ==
- Pam Tillis – vocals, backing vocals
- John Barlow Jarvis – acoustic piano, Hammond B3 organ
- Kevin McKendree – acoustic piano, Hammond B3 organ, harpsichord
- Jim Hoke – accordion, bass harmonica, harmonica, clarinet, penny whistle
- Pat Buchanan – electric guitars, harmonica
- J.T. Corenflos – electric guitars
- Russ Pahl – electric guitars, dobro, steel guitar
- Steve Sheehan – acoustic guitars, banjo
- Bryan Sutton – acoustic guitars, banjo, mandolin
- Sam Bush – mandolin
- Dan Dugmore – mandolin, steel guitar
- Aubrey Haynie – fiddle, mandolin
- Jonathan Yudkin – fiddle, mandolin
- Steve Mackey – bass guitar
- Michael Rhodes – bass guitar
- Eddie Bayers – drums, percussion
- Steve Brewster – drums, percussion
- John Anderson – vocals (4)
- Kristen Gartner – backing vocals
- Lona Heins – backing vocals
- Wes Hightower – backing vocals
- Mary Ann Kennedy – backing vocals
- Pam Rose – backing vocals
- Carrie April Tillis – backing vocals
- Mel Tillis Jr. – backing vocals

== Production ==
- Pam Tillis – producer
- Gary Nicholson – producer
- Matt Spicher – producer, additional recording, mastering, photography
- Matt Andrews – recording
- Dave Sinko – recording
- Patrick Granado – additional recording
- Ray Kennedy – mixing, mastering
- Mary Sue Englund – art design
- Glenn Sweitzer – art design
