= One of Those Things =

1991 song by Pam Tillis

Single by Pam Tillis
- B-side: "One Way Ticket"
- Released: June 1985
- Genre: Country
- Length: 3:36
- Label: Warner Bros.
- Songwriters: Pam Tillis, Paul Overstreet
- Producers: Steve Buckingham, Barry Beckett

Pam Tillis singles chronology
| "Goodbye Highway" (1984) | "One of Those Things" (1985) | "Those Memories of You" (1986) |

"One of Those Things"

Single by Pam Tillis

from the album Put Yourself in My Place
- B-side: "Already Fallen"
- Released: April 1991
- Genre: Country
- Length: 3:32
- Label: Arista Nashville
- Songwriters: Pam Tillis, Paul Overstreet
- Producers: Paul Worley, Ed Seay

Pam Tillis singles chronology
| "Don't Tell Me What to Do" (1991) | "One of Those Things" (1991) | "Put Yourself in My Place" (1991) |

"One of Those Things" is a song written by American country music artists Pam Tillis and Paul Overstreet and recorded by Tillis on Warner Bros. Records. The song was released as a single in June 1985, but did not chart. After signing with Arista Nashville in 1989, Tillis re-recorded the song and released it as the second single from her 1990 studio album Put Yourself in My Place in April 1991. This version reached number six on the Billboard Hot Country Singles & Tracks chart.

== Chart performance ==
| Chart (1991) | Peak position |
|---|---|
| Canada Country Singles (RPM) | 5 |
| US Hot Country Songs (Billboard) | 6 |

=== Year-end charts ===
| Chart (1991) | Position |
|---|---|
| Canada Country Tracks (RPM) | 55 |
| US Country Songs (Billboard) | 66 |
