= Please (Pam Tillis song) =

2000 song by Pam Tillis

Single by Pam Tillis

from the album Thunder & Roses
- B-side: "Thunder and Roses"
- Released: December 9, 2000
- Genre: Country
- Length: 3:31
- Label: Arista Nashville
- Songwriters: Jeffrey Steele, Michael Dulaney, John Hobbs
- Producer: Billy Joe Walker Jr.

Pam Tillis singles chronology
"After a Kiss" (1999)	"Please" (2000)

"Please" is a song recorded by American country music artist Pam Tillis. It was released in December 2000 as the first single from the album Thunder & Roses. The song reached #22 on the Billboard Hot Country Singles & Tracks chart. The song was written by Jeffrey Steele, Michael Dulaney and John Hobbs.

== Chart performance ==
Chart (2000–2001)	Peak position
US Bubbling Under Hot 100 (Billboard)	20
US Hot Country Songs (Billboard)	22
