= Homeward Looking Angel =

Studio album by Pam Tillis
- Released: September 29, 1992
- Recorded: 1992
- Studio: The Money Pit, Javelina, and The Music Mill (Nashville, Tennessee)
- Genre: Country
- Length: 36:38
- Label: Arista
- Producer: Paul Worley; Ed Seay

Pam Tillis chronology
Put Yourself in My Place (1991)	Homeward Looking Angel (1992)	Sweetheart's Dance (1994)

Singles from Homeward Looking Angel
- 1. "Shake the Sugar Tree" Released: August 22, 1992; 2. "Let That Pony Run" Released: January 4, 1993; 3. "Cleopatra, Queen of Denial" Released: May 1, 1993; 4. "Do You Know Where Your Man Is" Released: August 28, 1993

Homeward Looking Angel is the third studio album by American country music artist Pam Tillis. The album was a No. 23 album on the Billboard charts. This album produced four singles for Tillis on the Hot Country Songs charts: the Top Five hits "Shake the Sugar Tree" (No. 3) and "Let That Pony Run" (No. 4), as well as the Top 20 hits "Cleopatra, Queen of Denial" (No. 11) and "Do You Know Where Your Man Is" (No. 16). The demo tape of "Shake the Sugar Tree", sung by Stephanie Bentley, was incorporated into Tillis's recording.

"We've Tried Everything Else" was also recorded by Canadian country artist Michelle Wright on her 1994 album The Reasons Why, while "Rough and Tumble Heart" was previously recorded by Highway 101 on their 1989 album Paint the Town. The album has been certified Platinum for shipments of over 1,000,000 copies in the U.S.

== Critical reception ==
Professional ratings
Review scores
Source	Rating
AllMusic	3.5/5 stars
USA Today	2.5/4 stars

USA Today wrote that "Tillis has a strong, flexible voice and virtuosity in country, R&B and rock."

== Track listing ==
No.	Title	Writer(s)	Length
1.	"How Gone Is Goodbye"	Pam Tillis, Bob DiPiero, Jan Buckingham	3:16
2.	"Shake the Sugar Tree"	Chapin Hartford	3:08
3.	"Do You Know Where Your Man Is"	Carol Chase, Dave Gibson, Russell Smith	3:45
4.	"Cleopatra, Queen of Denial"	Tillis, DiPiero, Buckingham	3:12
5.	"Love Is Only Human" (duet with Marty Roe of Diamond Rio)	Annette Cotter, Kim Tribble	3:38
6.	"Rough and Tumble Heart"	Tillis, DiPiero, Sam Hogin	4:19
7.	"Let That Pony Run"	Gretchen Peters	3:30
8.	"Fine, Fine, Very Fine Love"	DiPiero, Jim Photoglo	3:12
9.	"We've Tried Everything Else"	Tillis, DiPiero, Steve Seskin	3:39
10.	"Homeward Looking Angel"	Tillis, DiPiero	4:57

== Personnel ==
Compiled from liner notes.

- Pam Tillis – lead vocals, backing vocals (2–4, 9, 10)
- Steve Nathan – piano (1, 3), organ (8, 10)
- Dennis Burnside – organ (2)
- Anthony Martin – piano (2), backing vocals (3), synthesizers (5, 7)
- John Hobbs – piano (4, 5, 7–9)
- John Jorgenson – electric guitar (1, 3), acoustic guitar (6)
- Biff Watson – acoustic guitar (1, 3–10)
- Paul Worley – acoustic guitar, tic tac bass (3), backing vocals (3), electric guitar (4), electric 12-string guitar (10)
- Bill Hullett – acoustic guitar (2), electric guitar (2), mandolin (2, 5, 7)
- Larry Byrom – electric guitar (4, 5, 7–10)
- Bruce Bouton – steel guitar (1, 3, 6)
- Sonny Garrish – steel guitar (4, 5, 7–10), lap steel guitar (4)
- Gary Morse – steel guitar (10)
- Joe Chemay – bass guitar (1, 3–10)
- Larry Paxton – bass guitar (2)
- Paul Leim – drums (1, 3, 4, 6, 8, 10)
- Lonnie Wilson – drums (2, 9)
- Eddie Bayers – drums (5, 7)
- Blaine Sprouce – fiddle (1–3, 6)
- Harry Stinson – backing vocals (1)
- Stephanie Bentley – backing vocals (2)
- Marty Roe – duet vocals (5)
- Dennis Wilson – backing vocals (6, 9)
- Mary Ann Kennedy – backing vocals (7)
- Pam Rose – backing vocals (7)
- Ashley Cleveland – backing vocals (8)
- Vicki Hampton – backing vocals (8)

Production

- Paul Worley – producer
- Ed Seay – producer, recording, mixing, recording (piano, acoustic guitar, fiddle & BGVs on 2)
- Anthony Martin – associate producer, second engineer
- Ernie Winfrey – recording (organ, guitars, mandolin, bass, drums & BGVs on 2)
- Clarke Schleicher – additional recording
- Carlos Grier – digital editing, mastering
- Don Cobb – mastering
- Denny Purcell – mastering
- Georgetown Masters (Nashville, Tennessee) – mastering location
- Ramona Simmons – project administrator
- Maude Gilman – art direction
- Peter Nash – photography
- Mary Beth Felts – make-up
- Linda DeMith – hair stylist

== Chart performance ==
Chart (1992)	Peak position
U.S. Billboard Top Country Albums	23
U.S. Billboard 200	82
Canadian RPM Country Albums	11
