= Cleopatra, Queen of Denial =

Single by Pam Tillis

from the album Homeward Looking Angel
- B-side: "Homeward Looking Angel"
- Released: May 1, 1993
- Genre: Country rock, rock and roll
- Length: 3:13
- Label: Arista Nashville
- Songwriters: Pam Tillis; Bob DiPiero; Jan Buckingham
- Producers: Paul Worley; Ed Seay; Anthony Martin

Pam Tillis singles chronology
| "Let That Pony Run" (1993) | "Cleopatra, Queen of Denial" (1993) | "Do You Know Where Your Man Is" (1993) |

"Cleopatra, Queen of Denial" is a song co-written and recorded by American country music artist Pam Tillis. It was released in May 1993 as the third single from her album Homeward Looking Angel. The song reached number 11 on the Billboard Hot Country Singles & Tracks chart in July 1993. The song was written by Tillis, Bob DiPiero, and Jan Buckingham.

== Content ==
The song is centered on Egyptian mythology, in which the narrator compares herself to Queen Cleopatra since she's "queen of denial" by her significant other (a play on words of The Nile River). A guitar solo in the chorus takes the melody of the traditional song The Streets of Cairo, or the Poor Little Country Maid, a song traditionally associated with Egyptian culture.

== Music video ==
The music video was directed by Michael Salomon, and premiered in mid-1993. It was nominated for Music Video of the Year at the 1993 Country Music Association Awards.

== Personnel ==
Compiled from liner notes.

- Larry Byrom – electric guitar
- Joe Chemay – bass guitar
- Sonny Garrish – pedal and lap steel guitars
- John Hobbs – piano
- Paul Leim – drums
- Pam Tillis – vocals
- Biff Watson – acoustic guitar
- Paul Worley – acoustic and electric guitars

== Chart performance ==
| Chart (1993) | Peak position |
|---|---|
| Canada Country Singles (RPM) | 28 |
| US Hot Country Songs (Billboard) | 11 |
