= Don't Tell Me What to Do =

1990 single by Pam Tillis

Single by Pam Tillis

from the album Put Yourself in My Place
- B-side: "Melancholy Child"
- Released: December 1, 1990
- Genre: Country
- Length: 3:12
- Label: Arista
- Songwriters: Harlan Howard, Max D. Barnes
- Producers: Paul Worley, Ed Seay

Pam Tillis singles chronology
"There Goes My Love" (1987)	"Don't Tell Me What to Do" (1990)	"One of Those Things" (1991)

"Don't Tell Me What to Do" is a song written by Harlan Howard and Max D. Barnes, and recorded by the American country music artist Pam Tillis. Her breakthrough single, it was released in December 1990 as the first single from the album Put Yourself in My Place. The song reached number 5 on the Billboard Hot Country Singles & Tracks chart.

Marty Stuart recorded this song in 1988 under the title "I'll Love You Forever (If I Want To)" for his Let There Be Country album, although the album was not released until 1992.

== Chart performance ==
Chart (1990–1991)	Peak position
Canada Country Singles (RPM)	18
US Hot Country Songs (Billboard)	5

=== Year-end charts ===
Chart (1991)	Position
US Country Songs (Billboard)	65
