= Put Yourself in My Place (Pam Tillis song) =

Single by Pam Tillis

from the album Put Yourself in My Place
- B-side: "I've Seen Enough to Know"
- Released: July 29. 1991
- Genre: Country
- Length: 2:49
- Label: Arista
- Songwriters: Pam Tillis, Carl Jackson
- Producers: Paul Worley, Ed Seay

Pam Tillis singles chronology
"One of Those Things" (1991)	"Put Yourself in My Place" (1991)	"Maybe It Was Memphis" (1991)

"Put Yourself in My Place" is a song co-written and recorded by American country music artist Pam Tillis. It was released in July 1991 as the third single and title track from the album Put Yourself in My Place. The song reached number 11 on the Billboard Hot Country Singles & Tracks chart and peaked at number 8 on the RPM Country Tracks in Canada. The song was written by Tillis and Carl Jackson.

== Music video ==
The music video was directed by Michael Merriman and premiered in late 1991.

== Chart performance ==
Chart (1991)	Peak position
Canada Country Singles (RPM)	8
US Hot Country Songs (Billboard)	11

=== Year-end charts ===
Chart (1991)	Position
Canada Country Tracks (RPM)	79
