= Spilled Perfume =

Single by Pam Tillis

from the album Sweetheart's Dance
- B-side: "'Til All the Lonely's Gone"
- Released: March 26, 1994
- Genre: Country
- Length: 3:53 (album version)
- Label: Arista Nashville
- Songwriters: Pam Tillis; Dean Dillon
- Producer: Pam Tillis; Steve Fishell

Pam Tillis singles chronology
"Do You Know Where Your Man Is" (1993)	"Spilled Perfume" (1994)	"When You Walk in the Room" (1994)

"Spilled Perfume" is a song co-written and recorded by American country music artist Pam Tillis. It was released in March 1994 as the lead single from her album Sweetheart's Dance. The song was written by Tillis and Dean Dillon.

== Content ==
The lyrics are a first-person account of a friend comforting a woman who is regretful after a one-night stand.

== Music video ==
A music video directed by Steven Goldmann was made for the song, and premiered in mid-1994.

== Personnel ==
Compiled from liner notes.

- Mike Brignardello – bass guitar
- Paul Franklin — steel guitar
- Rob Hajacos – fiddle
- Mary Ann Kennedy — background vocals
- Brent Mason — electric guitar
- Terry McMillan — percussion
- Steve Nathan – piano
- Bobby Ogdin – synthesizer
- Pam Tillis – lead vocals, background vocals
- Biff Watson – acoustic guitar
- Lonnie Wilson – drums

== Chart performance ==
For the chart week of June 18, 1994, "Spilled Perfume" reached the top 5 of Billboards Hot Country Songs chart, her fifth single to do so at the time.

=== Charts ===
Chart (1994)	Peak position
Canada Country Singles (RPM)	9
US Hot Country Songs (Billboard)	5

=== Year-end charts ===
Chart (1994)	Position
US Country Songs (Billboard)	36
