= Put Yourself in My Place (album) =

Studio album by Pam Tillis
- Released: January 29, 1991
- Recorded: 1990–1991
- Studio: Treasure Isle Recorders and The Money Pit (Nashville, Tennessee)
- Genre: Country
- Length: 34:21
- Label: Arista
- Producer: Paul Worley; Ed Seay

Pam Tillis chronology
Above and Beyond the Doll of Cutey (1983)	Put Yourself in My Place (1991)	Homeward Looking Angel (1992)

Singles from Put Yourself in My Place
- 1. "Don't Tell Me What to Do" Released: December 1, 1990; 2. "One of Those Things" Released: April 6, 1991; 3. "Put Yourself in My Place" Released: August 17, 1991; 4. "Maybe It Was Memphis" Released: November 25, 1991; 5. "Blue Rose Is" Released: April 11, 1992

Professional ratings
Review scores
Source	Rating
Allmusic	4/5 stars

Put Yourself in My Place is the second studio album from American country music artist Pam Tillis. It was also her first album with Arista Records, following 1983's Above and Beyond the Doll of Cutey, released on Warner Bros. Records. The album track Put Yourself in My Place reached number 10 on the Top Country Albums charts. Five singles were released from the album: "Don't Tell Me What to Do", followed by "One of Those Things", the title track, "Maybe It Was Memphis" and "Blue Rose Is". The album has been certified Gold for shipments of more than 500,000 copies in the U.S.

"Ancient History" was later covered by Prairie Oyster on the album Only One Moon. Their version was a number five hit on the RPM country charts.

== Track listing ==
No.	Title	Writer(s)	Length
1.	"Put Yourself in My Place"	Carl Jackson, Pam Tillis	2:48
2.	"Melancholy Child"	Tillis, Bob DiPiero	3:29
3.	"Maybe It Was Memphis"	Michael Anderson	3:59
4.	"Blue Rose Is"	Tillis, DiPiero, Jan Buckingham	3:41
5.	"Don't Tell Me What to Do"	Harlan Howard, Max D. Barnes	3:12
6.	"One of Those Things"	Tillis, Paul Overstreet	3:31
7.	"Draggin' My Chains"	Tillis, Rick Carnes	3:10
8.	"Ancient History"	DiPiero, John Scott Sherrill	2:58
9.	"I've Seen Enough to Know"	Tillis, Radney Foster	3:24
10.	"Already Fallen"	DiPiero, Tillis	4:08

== Personnel ==
- Pam Tillis – lead vocals, backing vocals
- Dennis Burnside – piano
- Matt Rollings – piano
- Carl Jackson – acoustic guitar
- Larry Byrom – electric guitar
- Steve Gibson – electric guitar
- John Jorgenson – electric guitar
- Bruce Bouton – steel guitar
- Mark O'Connor – fiddle, mandolin
- Glenn Worf – bass guitar
- Eddie Bayers – drums
- Paul Leim – drums
- Ashley Cleveland – backing vocals
- Vicki Hampton – backing vocals
- Karen Staley – backing vocals
- Harry Stinson – backing vocals
- Tricia Walker – backing vocals

=== Production ===
- Paul Worley – producer
- Ed Seay – producer, recording, mixing
- Mike Poole – recording assistant, mix assistant
- Clarke Schleicher – recording assistant, mix assistant
- Carlos Grier – digital editing
- Denny Purcell – mastering at Georgetown Masters (Nashville, Tennessee)
- Anthony Martin – production assistant
- Maude Gilman – art direction
- Peter Nash – photography
- Mary Beth Felts – make-up
- Kep Otterland – hair stylist
- Mike Robertson – management

== Charts ==
=== Weekly charts ===
Chart (1991)	Peak position
Canadian Country Albums (RPM)	12
US Billboard 200	69
US Top Country Albums (Billboard)	10

=== Year-end charts ===
Chart (1991)	Position
US Top Country Albums (Billboard)	67

== Certifications ==
Region	Certification	Certified units/sales
Canada (Music Canada)	Gold	50,000^{^}
United States (RIAA)	Gold	500,000^{^}
^{^} Shipments figures based on certification alone.
