= Maybe It Was Memphis =

Single by Pam Tillis

from the album Put Yourself in My Place
- B-side: "Draggin' My Chains"
- Released: November 25, 1991
- Recorded: 1990
- Genre: Country
- Length: 3:59 (album version)
- Label: Arista Nashville
- Songwriter: Michael Anderson
- Producers: Paul Worley, Ed Seay

Pam Tillis singles chronology
"Put Yourself in My Place" (1991)	"Maybe It Was Memphis" (1991)	"Blue Rose Is" (1992)

"Maybe It Was Memphis" is a song recorded by American country music artist Pam Tillis on two occasions. The second recording was released in 1991 as the fourth single from her album Put Yourself in My Place.

== History ==
Pam Tillis first cut the song on Warner Bros. Records in the late 1980s under the production of Josh Leo, but did not release this version until Warner issued the album Pam Tillis Collection in the mid-1990s.

Her second and more successful version of the song was recorded on her 1991 album Put Yourself in My Place. It was released in November 1991 as the album's fourth single and became her third Top Ten hit on the Billboard country charts, peaking at number 3 in February 1992. "Maybe It Was Memphis" was also nominated for the Country Music Association's Song of the Year in 1992. This version also earned Tillis a Grammy Award nomination for Best Country Vocal Performance, Female.

According to Arista Records' then-senior director of marketing Mike Dungan, executives were reluctant to release the song due to its more pop sound, and held off on doing so until Tillis had established herself.

== Content ==
The song is a mid-tempo ballad in which the female narrator recalls a former lover whom she met in Memphis, Tennessee. It is composed in the key of A major with a vocal range of A_{3}-E_{5}. The main chord pattern on the verses is A-D twice, E-D twice, and E-G-A.

Michael Anderson wrote the song in 1983. In an article for TAXI, he described the song writing process:

I believe I wrote the last verse soon after the first verse – may have been the same night - and I knew it was the last verse. I didn't want the standard "happy ever after" storyline – and I couldn't see it ending badly – so I left it open – just the way it was. I imagined myself back in LA remembering it all and just wrote that...I decided to just write a filler verse and then I would record it that way and change it when I got back to LA. So I made up some stuff about Tennessee Williams, William Faulkner, and country love songs ("summer night beauty took my breath away" was directly from "Southern Nights" by Glen Campbell and one of the song books – never even liked that song but the concept worked in context). I recorded it the next day and never changed the verse.

== Critical reception ==
In 2024, Rolling Stone ranked "Maybe It Was Memphis" at #177 on its 200 Greatest Country Songs of All Time ranking.

== Cover versions ==
Phil Seymour recorded a cover that was released on the 2011 reissue of his 1982 album Phil Seymour 2.

On May 24, 2011, Lauren Alaina performed the song during the finale of American Idol. Carrie Underwood selected the song as part of the round of competition in which each contestant's idol chose their song. On May 8, 2013, during the live rounds of the fourth season of The Voice, Danielle Bradbery from Blake Shelton's team sang it as her song. On season 23 of The Voice, Grace West sang the song for her blind audition.

== Chart positions ==
Chart (1991–1992)	Peak position
Canada Country Singles (RPM)	4
US Hot Country Songs (Billboard)	3

=== Year-end charts ===
Chart (1992)	Position
Canada Country Tracks (RPM)	60
US Country Songs (Billboard)	29

=== Danielle Bradbery ===
Chart (2013)	Peak position
US Hot Country Songs (Billboard)	25
US Billboard Hot 100	92
