= Let That Pony Run =

Single by Pam Tillis

from the album Homeward Looking Angel
- B-side: "Fine, Fine, Very Fine Love"
- Released: January 4, 1993
- Genre: Country
- Length: 3:31
- Label: Arista
- Songwriter: Gretchen Peters
- Producers: Paul Worley, Ed Seay

Pam Tillis singles chronology
"Shake the Sugar Tree" (1992)	"Let That Pony Run" (1993)	"Cleopatra, Queen of Denial" (1993)

"Let That Pony Run" is a song written by Gretchen Peters and recorded by American country music artist Pam Tillis. It was released in January 1993 as the second single from the album Homeward Looking Angel. The song reached number 4 on the Billboard Hot Country Singles & Tracks chart.

== Content ==
The song is a ballad about a woman named Mary, who relocates to West Virginia and rebuilds her life following a divorce from her husband, who confesses to having an affair.

== Music video ==
The music video was directed by Steven Goldmann and premiered in early 1993.

== Chart performance ==
Chart (1993)	Peak position
Canada Country Singles (RPM)	7
US Hot Country Songs (Billboard)	4

=== Year-end charts ===
Chart (1993)	Position
Canada Country Tracks (RPM)	87
