= Pam Tillis =

American country singer (born 1957)

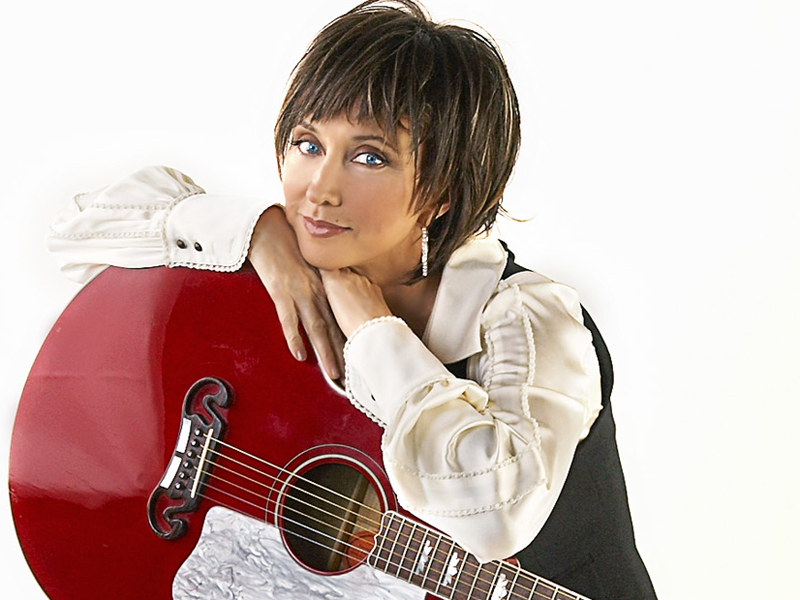
- Tillis in 2010
- Born: Pamela Yvonne Tillis; July 24, 1957 (age 69); Plant City, Florida, U.S.
- Education: University of Tennessee
- Occupations: Singer; songwriter; actress
- Years active: 1977–present
- Spouses: Rick Mason (m. 1978; div. 1978) Bob DiPiero (m. 1991; div. 1998) Matt Spicher (m. 2009)
- Children: 1
- Father: Mel Tillis
- Musical career
- Origin: Nashville, Tennessee, U.S.
- Genre: Country
- Instruments: Vocals; guitar
- Labels: Elektra; Warner; Arista Nashville; Lucky Dog; Stellar Cat; Red River Entertainment
- Website: www.pamtillis.com

Pamela Yvonne Tillis (born July 24, 1957) is an American country music singer and songwriter. She is the eldest child of country singer Mel Tillis and ex-wife of songwriter Bob DiPiero. After recording unsuccessful pop material for Elektra and Warner Records in the early 1980s, Tillis shifted to country music. In 1989, she signed with Arista Nashville, entering top-40 on Hot Country Songs for the first time with "Don't Tell Me What to Do" in 1990. This was the first of five singles from her breakthrough album Put Yourself in My Place.

Tillis recorded five more albums for Arista Nashville in the next ten years, including a greatest hits album. She charted twelve top-ten hits on the Billboard country music charts with Arista, including the number-one "Mi Vida Loca (My Crazy Life)" in 1995. Other major hits of hers include her signature song "Maybe It Was Memphis", along with "Shake the Sugar Tree", "Spilled Perfume", a cover of Jackie DeShannon's "When You Walk in the Room", and "All the Good Ones Are Gone". After exiting Arista, Tillis released It's All Relative: Tillis Sings Tillis for Lucky Dog Records in 2002, and RhineStoned and the Christmas album Just in Time for Christmas on her own Stellar Cat label in 2007. Her albums Homeward Looking Angel (1992), Sweetheart's Dance (1994), and Greatest Hits (1997) are all certified platinum by the Recording Industry Association of America, while Put Yourself in My Place and 1995's All of This Love are certified gold.

She has won two major awards: a Grammy Award for Best Country Collaboration with Vocals in 1999 for the multiple-artist collaboration "Same Old Train", and the 1994 Country Music Association award for Female Vocalist of the Year. In 2000, she was inducted into the Grand Ole Opry. In addition to her own work, Tillis has written songs for Barbara Fairchild, Juice Newton, and Highway 101, among others. Tillis's music style is defined by her singing voice, along with her influences of country, pop, and jazz.

== Early life ==
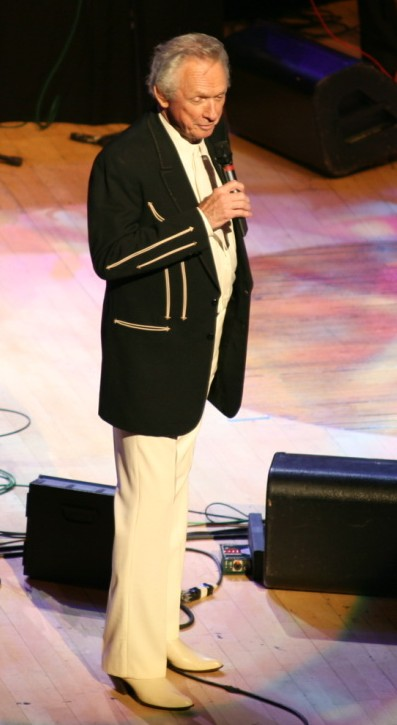
Pam Tillis is the oldest daughter of country singer Mel Tillis, pictured in 2007.

Pamela Yvonne Tillis was born July 24, 1957, in Plant City, Florida. She is the oldest of five children born to country singer Mel Tillis and his first wife, Doris. Because of her father being a country musician, she spent most of her early life in Nashville, Tennessee. When she was eight, her father invited her to sing "Tom Dooley" onstage at the Grand Ole Opry. She also began taking piano lessons at this age, and taught herself how to play guitar by age 12. At age 16, she was nearly killed in a car accident. She underwent five years of surgery, including facial reconstruction. Pam described her relationship with her father as "strict", and that she often felt "alienated" from him. She also stated that her father disapproved of her musical interests at the time, which included Linda Ronstadt and the Eagles.

Tillis enrolled at the University of Tennessee, where she performed in two groups: a jug band called the High Country Swing Band, and a folk duo with Ashley Cleveland. She dropped out of college in 1976 and moved to San Francisco, California. There, she founded a band called Freelight, which played jazz and rock. Tillis also sold Avon products for additional income. She briefly worked as a backing vocalist in her father's road band, but later quit this role over creative differences. Despite this, she sang backup on his 1980 hit "Your Body Is an Outlaw". Mel also hired her to work at his publishing company, which led to her writing Barbara Fairchild's 1978 single "The Other Side of the Morning".

== Music career ==
=== 1983–1990: Above and Beyond the Doll of Cutey and other early work ===
In 1981, Tillis signed her first recording contract with Elektra Records. The label released her debut single "Every Home Should Have One" that same year. Unlike her later music, "Every Home Should Have One" was a disco song. While this was her only release for Elektra, she remained with its parent company, Warner Records. The latter label released her debut album in 1983 called Above and Beyond the Doll of Cutey. The album was co-produced by Dixie Gamble, then-wife of record producer Jimmy Bowen. Assisting her was the production team Jolly Hills Productions, which included session musicians Josh Leo and Craig Krampf. Above and Beyond the Doll of Cutey featured the singles "Killer Comfort" and "Love Is Sneakin' Up on You". While neither single charted, the former received a music video that aired on MTV. Kevin John Coyne of Country Universe rated the album two stars out of five, stating that "Pam Tillis, even in her early days, is a smart songwriter with cutting insights on the human experience. To try and make her a carefree New Wave pop star is to undermine what makes her special in the first place."

Citing dissatisfaction with the pop music she was recording, Tillis returned to Nashville, while retaining her contract with Warner. She made her first entry on the Billboard Hot Country Songs charts in 1984 with "Goodbye Highway", a song she co-wrote with Mary Ann Kennedy and Pam Rose. Her follow-up "One of Those Things" did not chart. Janie Fricke later recorded a version of the song, as well. After this came four other singles that made the lower regions of the charts between 1986 and 1987. One of these, "Those Memories of You", was later a top-five hit for Dolly Parton, Emmylou Harris, and Linda Ronstadt. Due to the poor performance of her singles, Tillis was dropped from Warner in 1987. Despite her lack of commercial success, the Academy of Country Music nominated her in 1986 for Top New Female Vocalist. She supported herself in this timespan by performing at various nightclubs and in her own local revues. These included Twang Night (where she sang covers of 1960s country standards) and Women in the Round (where she sang with other female songwriters). The latter featured writers such as Ashley Cleveland, Tricia Walker, and Karen Staley. According to Tillis herself, these revues led to her gaining increased exposure throughout the city. She also supplemented her career by singing advertising jingles for Country Time powdered drink mix, Coca-Cola, and Coors beer.

=== 1989–1992: Put Yourself in My Place ===
In mid-1989, Arista Records' then-president Clive Davis announced the creation of the label's country music division titled Arista Nashville. Tillis was one of the first five acts signed to the label, alongside Alan Jackson, Lee Roy Parnell, Michelle Wright, and Asleep at the Wheel. Prior to releasing any material of her own, Tillis and Kix Brooks (who later signed to Arista Nashville himself as one-half of Brooks & Dunn) co-wrote the promotional single "Tomorrow's World", released on Warner to honor the 20th anniversary of Earth Day. Twenty country music acts contributed vocals to the project, including Highway 101, Lynn Anderson, Vince Gill, Dan Seals, and Brooks and Tillis. The song entered the Hot Country Songs charts in May 1990, peaking at 74. Tillis also co-wrote Juice Newton's 1989 single "When Love Comes Around the Bend" (later covered by Seals in 1992) and Highway 101's 1990 single "Someone Else's Trouble Now".

Tillis made her debut on Arista Nashville in late 1990 with "Don't Tell Me What to Do". It peaked at number five on the Billboard country charts in early 1991, thus becoming her first successful single release. The song also went to number one on the country music charts of the former Radio & Records. Marty Stuart also recorded the song for Columbia Records in 1988, although his rendition was not released until 1992. The song served as the lead single to her breakthrough album Put Yourself in My Place, which was issued in January 1991. Paul Worley (a producer and guitarist known at the time for his work with Eddy Raven and Highway 101) co-produced the project with Ed Seay. A re-recording of "One of Those Things" was the album's next single, also reaching top 10 on the country charts. After it came the album's title track, which Tillis co-wrote with Carl Jackson. The album's highest-charting single was "Maybe It Was Memphis", which peaked at number three in early 1992. "Maybe It Was Memphis" has since been described as Tillis's signature song. Tillis had originally recorded the song while on Warner, but did not release this version at the time. According to Billboard, Arista Nashville executives were initially reluctant to release "Maybe It Was Memphis" as a single until Tillis was "firmly established" as an artist, due to the song's more country pop sound. The album's fifth and final single was "Blue Rose Is", another song which Tillis co-wrote. This song was less successful on the charts. All of the singles from Put Yourself in My Place except "Blue Rose Is" also made top 20 on the Canadian country music charts then published by RPM. Another cut from the album, "Ancient History", was later a single for the Canadian band Prairie Oyster in 1996.

Alanna Nash of Entertainment Weekly gave Put Yourself in My Place a "B+" rating, saying that it "shows how well she can craft smart and sassy country material...and also sell it with a commanding, big-voiced presence". Kevin John Coyne wrote in a 2007 retrospective of Tillis, "It’s easy to overlook Put Yourself in My Place when discussing Pam’s body of work because of the much stronger albums that would follow...However, that’s more of a tribute to the quality of the music to come than any deficiency of the album itself." Brian Mansfield of AllMusic wrote that "The album that established Pam Tillis as a performer in her own right has a traditional country base cut with bluegrass, folk, and rock." The Country Music Association (CMA) nominated Tillis in both 1991 and 1992 for the Horizon Award (now called the Best New Artist Award). The same association nominated her twice in the category Single of the Year: for "Don't Tell Me What to Do" in 1991 and "Maybe It Was Memphis" one year later. She was also nominated by the Academy of Country Music for Top Female Vocalist five times between 1991 and 1995. "Maybe It Was Memphis" also gave Tillis her first Grammy Award nomination, in the category of Grammy Award for Best Female Country Vocal Performance, at the 35th Grammy Awards in 1993. Put Yourself in My Place was certified gold by the Recording Industry Association of America (RIAA) in June 1992 for sales of 500,000 copies.

=== 1992–1995: Homeward Looking Angel and Sweetheart's Dance ===
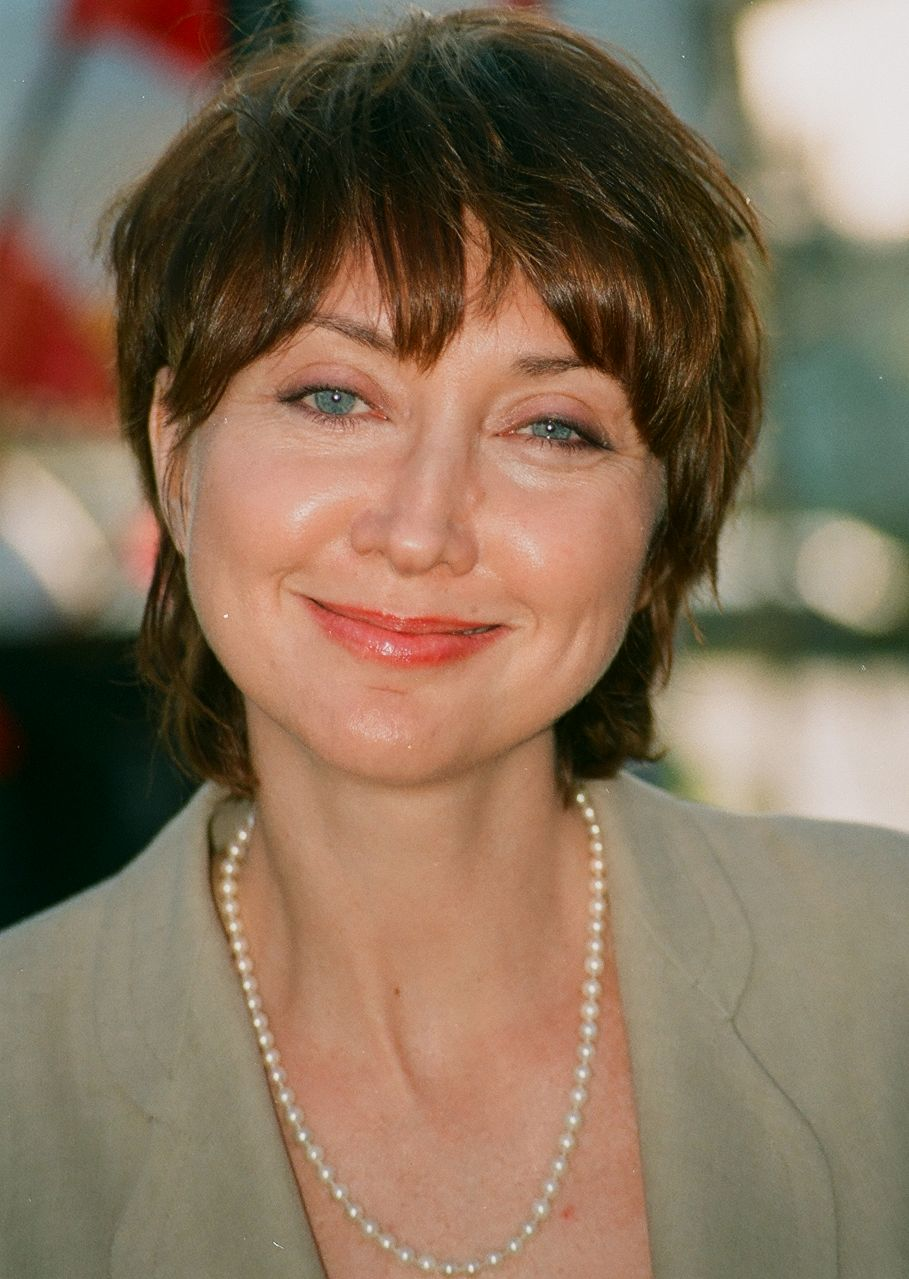
Tillis in 1995

In 1992, Arista Nashville released Tillis's next album, Homeward Looking Angel. The lead single, "Shake the Sugar Tree", reached the top five on the country charts the same year. Tillis and Worley both enjoyed the sound of Stephanie Bentley's vocals on the demonstration track and chose to retain them on the final recording. The album charted another top-10 hit with the Gretchen Peters composition "Let That Pony Run". After it, "Cleopatra, Queen of Denial" and "Do You Know Where Your Man Is" peaked in lower chart positions. Homeward Looking Angel also included a duet with Diamond Rio lead singer Marty Roe titled "Love Is Only Human". Tillis co-wrote half of the album's songs including "Cleopatra, Queen of Denial" with her then-husband, songwriter Bob DiPiero. Worley provided backing vocals on "Do You Know Where Your Man Is". The album was certified platinum in 1995 for sales of one million copies. Alanna Nash rated Homeward Looking Angel "C+", calling Tillis's vocals "irritatingly in-your-face". Roch Parisien of AllMusic called it a "very solid" album, praising the songwriting of the singles in particular.

Tillis contributed to two collaborative singles in 1993: Dolly Parton's "Romeo" and George Jones's "I Don't Need Your Rockin' Chair". The former was nominated that year for Grammy Award for Best Country Collaboration with Vocals, while the latter won Vocal Event of the Year from the Country Music Association (CMA). The CMA organization also nominated her for Female Vocalist of the Year, while "Cleopatra, Queen of Denial" was nominated by both the Academy of Country Music and the Country Music Association for Video of the Year. In early 1994, several of Tillis's archived recordings for Warner were compiled into an album titled Collection. Included on this were the singles "There Goes My Love" and "Those Memories of You", along with the original Warner recordings of "Maybe It Was Memphis" and "One of Those Things". Also included was her previously unreleased rendition of "Five Minutes", a single in 1990 for Lorrie Morgan. Mansfield considered the inclusion of the latter three songs "interesting" in a review for AllMusic.

Sweetheart's Dance, Tillis's third Arista album, was released in April 1994. A year later, it became her second platinum album. It was also certified platinum by the Canadian Recording Industry Association (now Music Canada). Tillis intentionally sought more songs by outside writers than on the first two Arista albums, stating that she "wanted to paint a landscape rather than a self-portrait". She also co-produced for the first time, doing so with guitarist and producer Steve Fishell. The album's lead single "Spilled Perfume" (which Tillis co-wrote with Dean Dillon) reached top five on the country charts after its release. Its follow-up was a cover of Jackie DeShannon's "When You Walk in the Room", which peaked at number two on Billboard and number one on Radio & Records. This cover featured backing vocals from Mary Chapin Carpenter and Kim Richey. After it came "Mi Vida Loca (My Crazy Life)", Tillis's only number-one single on both the Billboard and RPM charts. The album's next single, "I Was Blown Away", made number 16 before Tillis requested that it be withdrawn as a single, as she thought the title would be insensitive to listeners after the Oklahoma City bombing. Its replacement was "In Between Dances", which became a top five hit by year's end. The album's closing track "'Til All the Lonely's Gone" featured bluegrass musician Bill Monroe on mandolin, plus backing vocals from Mel Tillis along with Pam's siblings Carrie, Cindy, Connie, and Mel Tillis Jr. Brian Mansfield rated the album four-and-a-half stars out of five, writing that it "found the magic blend of Nashville sound, California country rock, and post-Beatles pop." John D. McLaughlin of The Province called Tillis "clear-eyed and confident", while praising the inclusion of her family on the closing track. The CMA awarded her Female Vocalist of the Year in 1994, and she was nominated again in the same category again every year through 1997. "Mi Vida Loca" was nominated for Best Female Country Vocal Performance at the 38th Annual Grammy Awards in early 1996.

=== 1995–1997: All of This Love and Greatest Hits ===
During this time, Tillis played a benefit concert for Nashville Cares, a local association dedicated to support of those with HIV/AIDS. In late 1995, Tillis released All of This Love, her fourth disc for Arista and fifth overall. All of This Love produced top-10 hits with "Deep Down" and "The River and the Highway". Also included on it were the number-14 "It's Lonely Out There" and "Betty's Got a Bass Boat", her first Arista single to miss the top 40. She produced the album by herself. At the time, Tom Roland of The Tennessean noted the rarity of female producers in country music, citing Gail Davies, Rosanne Cash, and Wendy Waldman among the few. Tillis compared her role as producer to that of a film director and noted that all of the musicians involved were supportive. She also considered her role "ironic" because the song "The River and the Highway" contrasts how men and women perceive a relationship. Billboard rated All of This Love favorably, saying that Tillis "continues to mature as a singer". All of This Love became Tillis's second gold album. She supported the album by touring with Lorrie Morgan and Carlene Carter.

A Greatest Hits package followed in 1997, compiling her most successful Arista singles to that point. The album featured two new tracks which were both released as singles. These were "All the Good Ones Are Gone" and "Land of the Living", which both reached top five on the country charts in 1997. The former was nominated Song of the Year at the 1997 Academy of Country Music awards, Music Video of the Year and Single of the Year at the Country Music Association awards, and Best Female Country Vocal Performance at the 40th Grammy Awards. Greatest Hits became Tillis's third and final platinum album in 2001.

=== 1998–2001: Every Time and Thunder & Roses ===
Tillis released Every Time for Arista Nashville in 1998. Unlike her previous albums, Tillis did not co-write any of the songs. She told The Tennessean at the time of the album's release that she thought her then-recent divorce from Bob DiPiero would make any song she co-wrote "dark and depressing". Contributing writers on the album were Beth Nielsen Chapman, Leslie Satcher, and Eagles member Timothy B. Schmit. Tillis co-produced with guitarist and producer Billy Joe Walker Jr., with additional production from Chris Farren on his composition "We Must Be Thinking Alike". One of Satcher's compositions, "I Said a Prayer", was the album's lead single. This song reached number twelve on the American country charts and number seven on the Canadian country charts. The title track was the album's only other single. Jana Pendragon of Allmusic praised Tillis's voice and song selection, although she criticized the "usual overproduction that characterizes Nashville in the '90s". Joel Bernstein of Country Standard Time was mixed toward the album as well. He thought that "I Said a Prayer" sounded like a "sixties girl group" and said that the rest of the album "lacks her usual playfulness."

Tillis was involved in multiple collaborative efforts after the release of Every Time. One of these was recording the original song "After a Kiss" for the soundtrack to the 1999 film Happy, Texas. This song charted at number 50 on Hot Country Songs that year. She was also one of several artists on the single "Same Old Train" from the 1999 Columbia Records tribute album Tribute to Tradition. This song won the Grammy Award for Best Country Collaboration with Vocals that same year. The Academy of Country Music also nominated this collaboration for Vocal Event of the Year, her last nomination to date from that association. She and Jason Sellers covered George Jones and Tammy Wynette's 1976 duet "Golden Ring" on Sellers's 1999 album A Matter of Time. Also in 1999, Tillis played several concerts with her father. In 2000, country singer Little Jimmy Dickens invited Tillis to become a member of the Grand Ole Opry. Marty Stuart inducted her on August 26, 2000. Later that year she appeared at a ceremony honoring the Grand Ole Opry's 75th anniversary, which was televised on the former TNN (The Nashville Network). Kenny Chesney's 2000 single "I Lost It" featured Tillis on background vocals.

Restructuring of Arista Nashville's parent company Sony Music Nashville delayed release of Tillis's last Arista album Thunder & Roses. Originally slated for release in 2000, it was not issued until early 2001. The album included another duet with her father called "Waiting on the Wind". The pair had previously sung the song in concert several years prior. Walker and Worley alternated production duties with Dann Huff and Kenny Greenberg. The only chart entry off Thunder & Roses was "Please", which peaked at number 22 on the Billboard country chart. Kevin Oliver of Country Standard Time described "Please" as "one of those uplifting slice of life anthems that sounds great on the radio and connects with women on some level that men will never completely understand." He also thought the album as a whole had a "strong yet deft touch". Tillis herself cited the song as one that would appeal to single women.

=== 2002–2003: It's All Relative ===
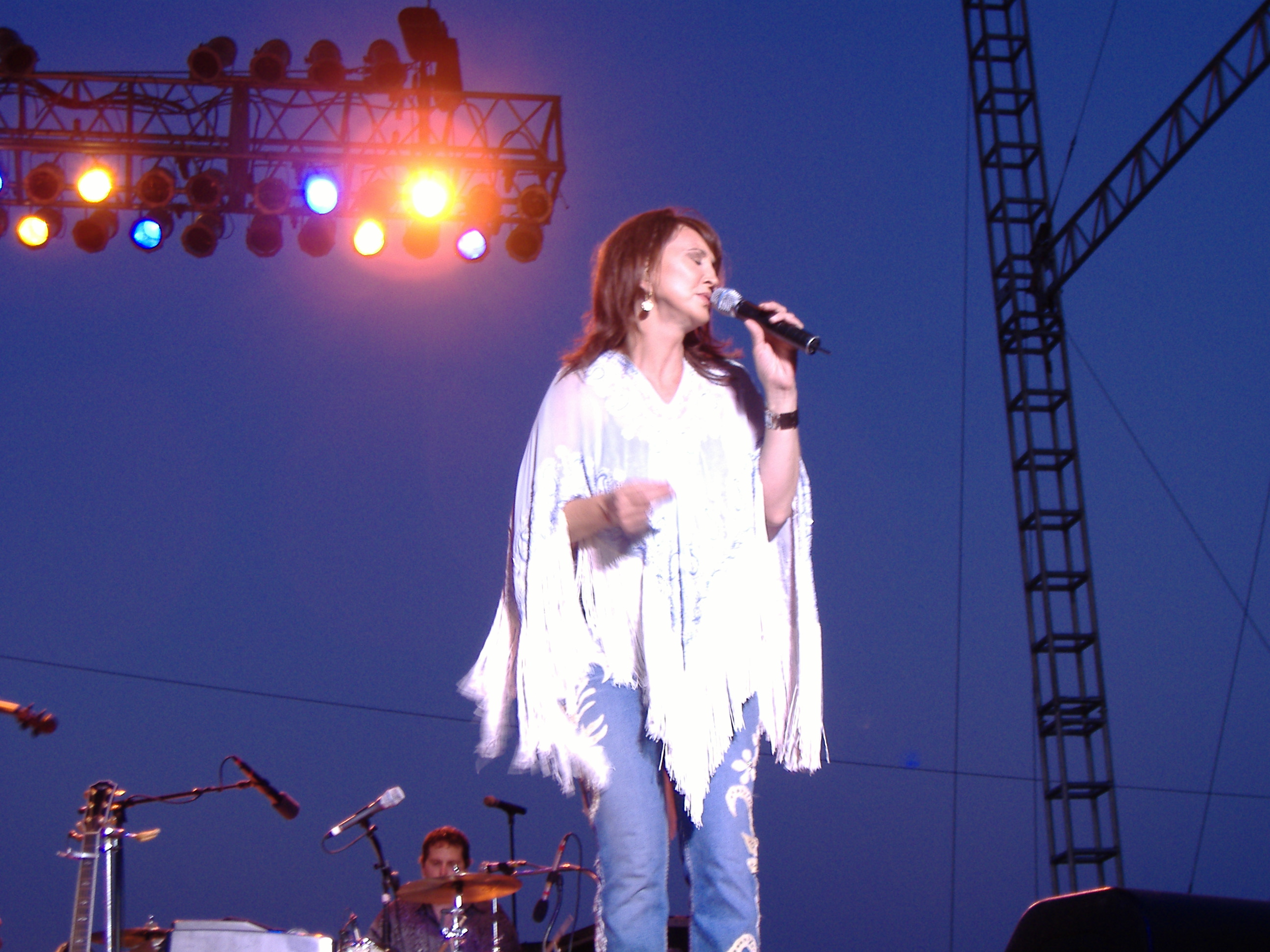
Tillis singing at the 2006 Missouri State Fair

Tillis exited Arista Nashville in early 2002, citing both the expiration of her contract and her dissatisfaction with Arista executives prioritizing songs that had potential radio success over songs she wanted to record. After exiting the label, she began recording a tribute album to her father, consisting of songs that he recorded or wrote for other artists. Although she originally intended to record the project independently, she signed with Epic Records' Lucky Dog branch in 2002. Titled It's All Relative: Tillis Sings Tillis, the tribute album was released through Lucky Dog that same year. Ray Benson, frontman of the Western swing band Asleep at the Wheel, produced the album. One of the songs covered was "I Ain't Never", a number-one single for Mel Tillis in 1972. It also featured covers of Patsy Cline's "So Wrong" and Bobby Bare's "Detroit City". Dolly Parton contributed vocals to a cover of "The Violet and a Rose", Mel Tillis's first chart entry in 1958. Trisha Yearwood and Rhonda Vincent sang backing vocals on a cover of "Honey (Open That Door)", a number-one single written by Mel Tillis for Ricky Skaggs. Other musicians on the album included Marty Stuart, Delbert McClinton, and The Jordanaires. Country Standard Time writer Eli Messinger praised Pam Tillis's vocal delivery on her father's songs, calling the collection "heartfelt".

In June 2003, Tillis was dropped from Lucky Dog following another label re-structuring. Despite this, she began performing her own shows in Branson, Missouri, at a theater owned by comedian Yakov Smirnoff. These shows included both her and her father's hit singles, as well as stories about her childhood. Her sister Carrie contributed backing vocals to these shows. Smirnoff had offered her the opportunity to perform there, and she accepted because she thought it would allow for a different presentation style than her standard concerts. In particular, the use of a theater allowed her to incorporate costumes into her performance. She continued to perform in Branson in 2004 with Larry Gatlin and the Gatlin Brothers. In 2005, she replaced Linda Davis as the lead act of an annual Christmas concert held at the Gaylord Opryland Resort & Convention Center in Nashville. She continued to tour at this point, and compiled both a concert DVD and a Christmas album sold exclusively at her shows.

=== 2007–present: Founding her own record label ===
Tillis did not release another album until 2007, when she founded her own label called Stellar Cat. Her first album for her own label was RhineStoned. Co-writers on the album included Leslie Satcher, Lisa Brokop, Matraca Berg, Jon Randall, and Verlon Thompson. John Anderson sang duet vocals on "Life Sure Has Changed Us Around". Tillis thought that being on her own label allowed her more creative freedom than before, including her decisions to market the album to Americana music formats, and to make a music video for the track "Band in the Window" despite not officially promoting it as a single. She co-produced the project with singer-songwriter Gary Nicholson. Kevin Oliver of Country Standard Time found influences of rock music and jazz, stating that the album was "widely varied and enjoyable". The Christmas album previously available only at her concerts was released later in the year as Just in Time for Christmas. It featured a mix of Christmas standards and original content. Also in 2007, the Country Music Hall of Fame opened an exhibition called "It's All Relative", featuring artifacts from Mel and Pam's music careers.

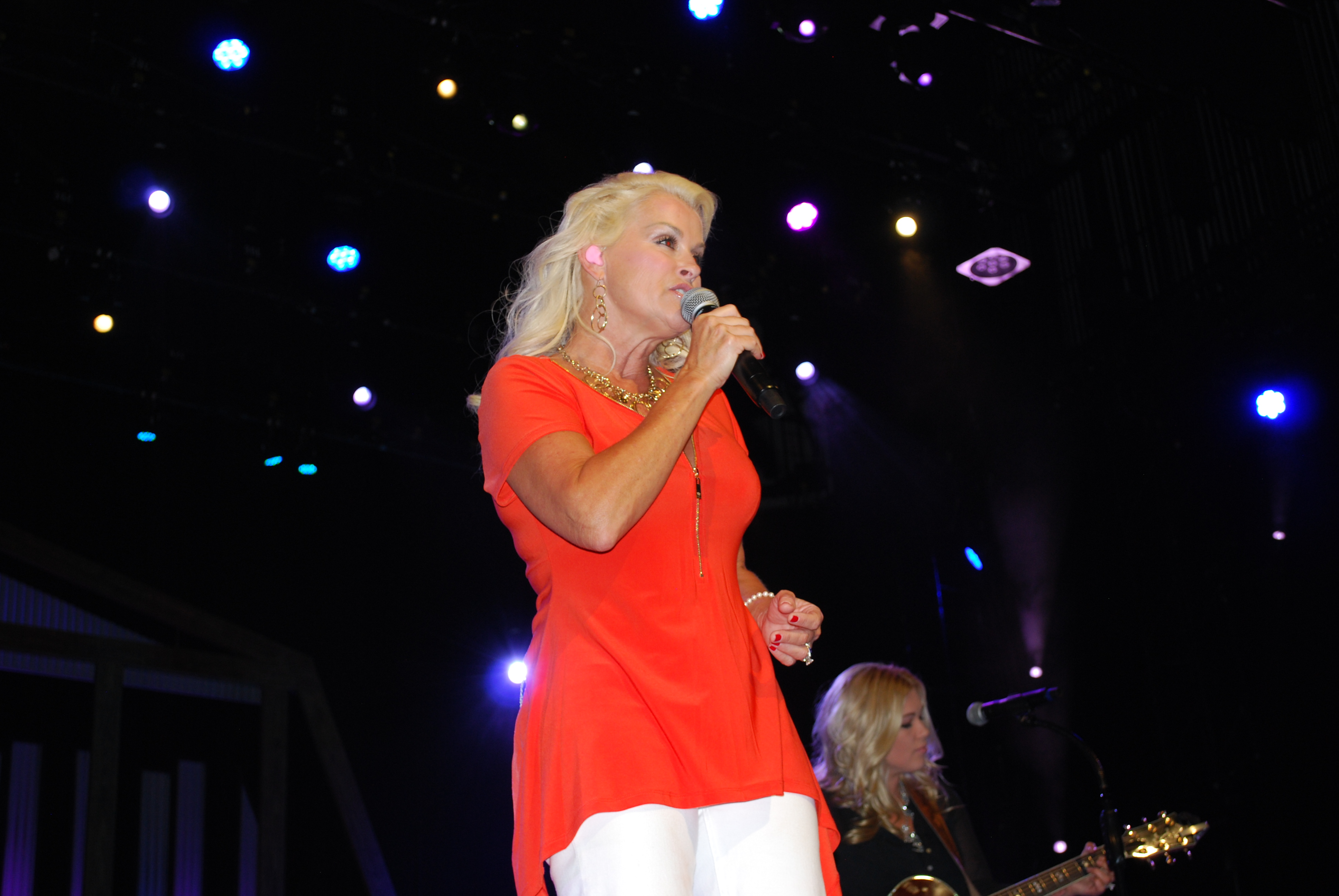
Pam Tillis has recorded two albums with Lorrie Morgan, pictured in 2015.

Tillis started a tour in 2008 that included Regina, Saskatchewan dates in January. For this tour, she sang both her and her father's songs, along with album cuts and new material. She recorded no other albums until 2012's Recollection, which comprised re-recordings of her hit singles from Arista Nashville. She chose to do this when noticing how "dated" she thought some of her old songs sounded, and relied on her road band to provide instrumentation. After she booked tour dates with Lorrie Morgan, the two artists decided to record a collaborative album called Dos Divas in 2013. The album included a mix of solo songs from each artist as well as a number of duets. They also toured together to promote this album on a tour called Grits and Glamour. A second collaborative album, Come See Me and Come Lonely, followed in 2017. Also at this point she began performing acoustic concerts with two acoustic guitarists as the Pam Tillis Trio. Tillis, Morgan, and Terri Clark held a benefit concert in 2018 for country singer Anita Cochran after she was diagnosed with cancer. Tillis also revived Women in the Round in 2017 with Ashley Cleveland, Tricia Walker, and Karen Staley.

In 2020, Tillis announced that she had been recording a new album. On February 28, 2020, Tillis released the title track of the album, "Looking for a Feeling". The album itself was released two months later. It features twelve tracks, six of which were co-written by Tillis, as well as a cover of Gillian Welch and David Rawlings's "Dark Turn of Mind". On June 29, 2022, Tillis had been nominated for induction into the Nashville Songwriters Hall of Fame alongside Kirk Franklin, Brad Paisley, and Shania Twain, though Twain ultimately received the honor.

== Musical styles ==
Colin Larkin wrote in the Virgin Encyclopedia of Country Music in 1999 that "her powerful vocal styling may not suit everybody". He also wrote at the time that "it still remains to be seen whether she can really establish herself with the hardline country traditionalists." The editors of the Encyclopedia of Country Music described Tillis as a "vocal stylist...pairing contemporary country lyrics with traditional country vocals, paving the way for such singers as Mindy McCready". Tillis described her own vocal style as "not the twangiest country singer out there", as she thought her voice also contained rhythm and blues and rock phrasings. Roch Parisien of AllMusic described her voice as "pure, full-bodied country" and a "genuinely throaty twang", despite considering it "exaggerated to the point of annoyance" on "Do You Know Where Your Man Is". Steven Wine, reviewing Looking for a Feeling for the Associated Press, said that she "has mastered the art of singing without raising her voice. She swoops and slides, yes, but most of all she smolders, an alto with a blue hue." Alanna Nash of Entertainment Weekly wrote of Sweetheart's Dance that "Moving beyond the attention she gained from her Kewpie doll face and piercing soprano, she’s gone the distance to incorporate all of her musical past into the country framework for an updated, '90s feel." Robert K. Oermann, in the book Behind the Grand Ole Opry Curtain: Tales of Romance and Tragedy, described Tillis as having a "torrid soprano", "vivid songwriting", and "enchanting wit".

Writers have taken notice of Tillis's use of wordplay in her material. Reviewing All of This Love for Country Standard Time, Joel Bernstein noted Tillis's affinity for wordplay in her song titles, such as on that album's "Tequila Mockingbird". Nash criticized the song for similar reasons, and Kevin John Coyne of Country Universe cited "Blue Rose Is" as another example of wordplay. Bernstein also thought of her decision to produce All of This Love by herself that "tastefulness continues to be Tillis' trademark". In an interview with Country Universe in 2020, Tillis stated that her later albums featured fewer songs she wrote than her earlier albums due to her own criticism of her work. She ultimately decided to start co-writing again on Looking for a Feeling because she considered her own writing to be "words out of [her] heart". Nash, reviewing Collection in 1994, thought that because the album contained material recorded earlier in her career, it lacked the "plucky personality and the supercharged vocals that now punch their way out of the radio". Both Nash and Larry Crowley of The Arizona Republic thought that "Spilled Perfume", which is about one woman confronting another over a one-night stand, displayed feminist themes. Coyne thought that Put Yourself in My Place showed an unusual amount of artistic freedom for a new country music act in the 1990s. He considered "Maybe It Was Memphis" to be her signature song, stating that its "fiery performance and the aggressive production still sound fresh today".

Being the daughter of a country musician, she was regularly compared to her father. Because of this, she told the Associated Press in 2017 that she felt the best advice to give to an aspiring musician was "be yourself". She also said that her father exposed her to other musical influences besides himself, such as Patsy Cline and Loretta Lynn. Despite this, she also noted that her father was very strict about what music she could listen to and what concerts she could attend as a child; specifically, she stated that her listening to The Beatles "alienated" him. In addition, she stated that differences in musical tastes were what ended her role as his backing vocalist. Of her attempts to establish a musical identity separate from her father, Colin Larkin wrote in 1999 that she "has made a promising start".

== Acting ==
Tillis holds several acting roles in television, film, and theater. One of her first was the 1993 movie The Thing Called Love, in which she and several other country music singers made guest appearances. She also had cameo appearances in the NBC crime show L.A. Law, along with episodes of Diagnosis: Murder and Promised Land on CBS. Of acting, Tillis said that she did not find it considerably different from singing, because both roles require "taking the raw material of emotion and making something out of it." In 1999, she appeared in the Broadway revue Smokey Joe's Cafe, where she and others performed various show tunes by Jerry Leiber and Mike Stoller. Of doing so, Tillis stated at the time that she "wanted to branch out", and took a role in the show when her agent found the position was available. She also appeared as herself on the American Broadcasting Company musical drama Nashville. Drag queen RuPaul, a fan of Tillis's, invited her to appear as a guest judge on an episode of RuPaul's Drag Race.

== Personal life ==
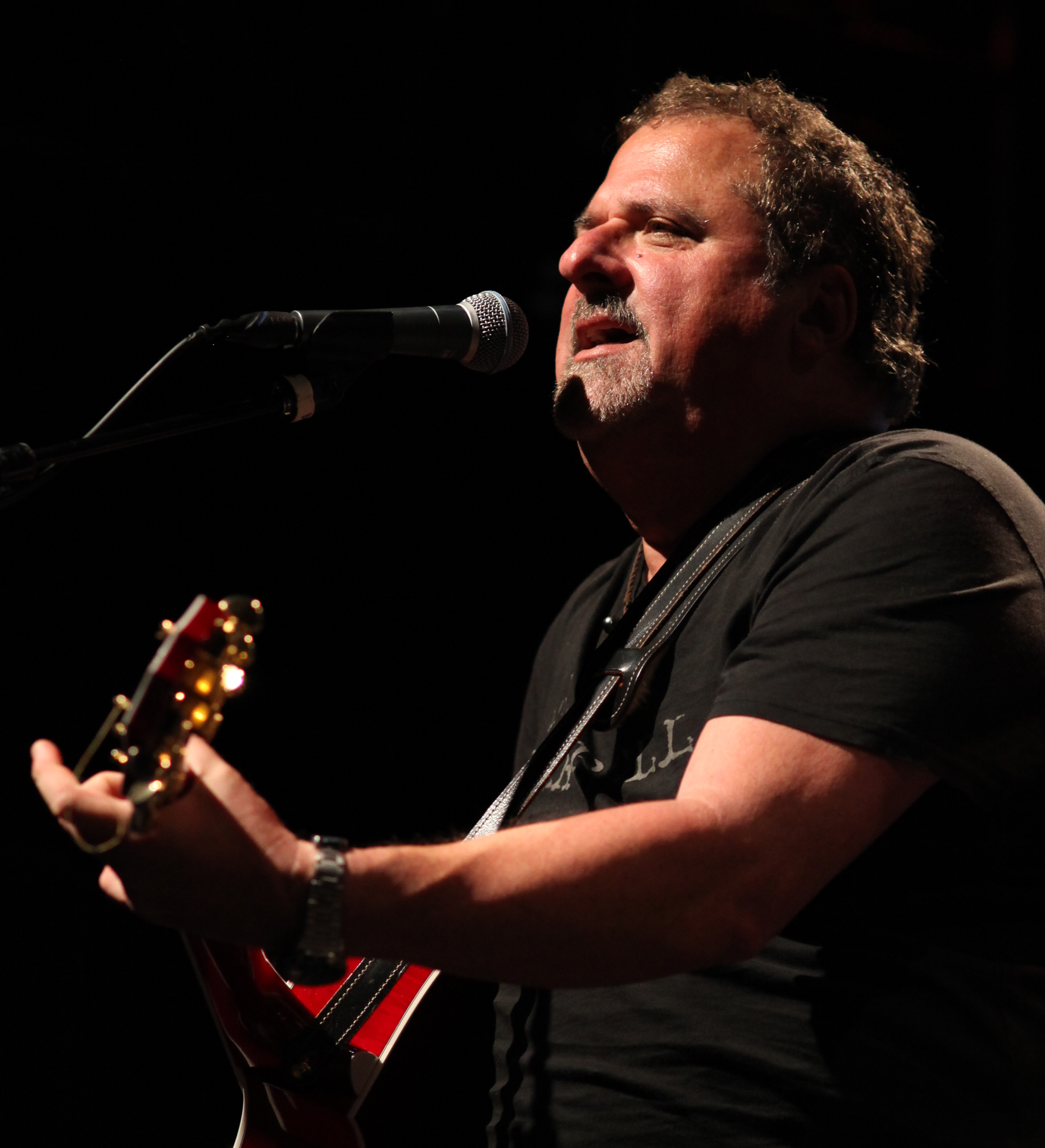
Pam Tillis is the ex-wife of songwriter Bob DiPiero.

Pam Tillis' first marriage was to Rick Mason in 1978. The couple had one son named Ben, with whom Tillis was pregnant when the couple divorced the same year. She told Closer Weekly in 2019 that she divorced Mason because of his alcoholism and her concerns that she "was not ready" to be in a relationship. She assumed custody of Ben after the divorce. As of 2019, Ben works as a wilderness guide.

In 1991 Tillis married songwriter and guitarist Bob DiPiero. He occasionally toured as a member of her road band Mystic Biscuit. DiPiero co-wrote "Blue Rose Is", "Cleopatra, Queen of Denial", and "It's Lonely Out There". In 1996, the couple bought a house in Nashville which was previously owned by Rodney Crowell and Rosanne Cash prior to their divorce. Tillis and DiPiero divorced in 1998. In 2019, she told Closer Weekly that the two divorced because she felt that their musical careers were overtaking their personal lives, although she also stated that she still considered DiPiero an "awesome person". Tillis began dating musician, photographer, and record producer Matt Spicher in 2001. The two married in 2009.

Tillis' brother Mel Tillis Jr., often credited as Sonny Tillis, is also a singer and songwriter. He co-wrote Jamie O'Neal's number-one single "When I Think About Angels" along with singles by Clinton Gregory, Tammy Cochran, and Ty Herndon. Tillis' father, Mel Tillis, died at age 85 in 2017, after which Sonny began touring as a tribute act to him. Tillis' mother, Doris, died at age 79 in 2019.

== Discography ==
Studio albums

- Above and Beyond the Doll of Cutey (1983)
- Put Yourself in My Place (1991)
- Homeward Looking Angel (1992)
- Sweetheart's Dance (1994)
- All of This Love (1995)
- Every Time (1998)
- Thunder & Roses (2001)
- It's All Relative: Tillis Sings Tillis (2002)
- RhineStoned (2007)
- Just in Time for Christmas (2007)
- Recollection (2009)
- Dos Divas with Lorrie Morgan (2013)
- Come See Me and Come Lonely with Lorrie Morgan (2017)
- Looking for a Feeling (2020)

== Awards and nominations ==
Year	Association	Category	Nominated work	Result
1986	Academy of Country Music	Top New Female Vocalist	—N/a	Nominated
1991	Academy of Country Music	Top Female Vocalist	—N/a	Nominated
1991	Country Music Association	Horizon Award	—N/a	Nominated
1991	Country Music Association	Single of the Year	"Don't Tell Me What to Do"	Nominated
1992	Academy of Country Music	Top Female Vocalist	—N/a	Nominated
1992	Country Music Association	Horizon Award	—N/a	Nominated
1992	Country Music Association	Single of the Year	"Maybe It Was Memphis"	Nominated
1993	Academy of Country Music	Top Female Vocalist	—N/a	Nominated
1993	Country Music Association	Female Vocalist of the Year	—N/a	Nominated
1993	Country Music Association	Music Video of the Year	"Cleopatra, Queen of Denial"	Nominated
1993	Country Music Association	Vocal Event of the Year	"I Don't Need Your Rockin' Chair" (Note: With Clint Black, Garth Brooks, T. Graham Brown, Mark Chesnutt, Joe Diffie, Vince Gill, Alan Jackson, Patty Loveless, and Travis Tritt)	Won
1993	Grammy Awards	Grammy Award for Best Female Country Vocal Performance	"Maybe It Was Memphis"	Nominated
1994	Academy of Country Music	Top Female Vocalist	—N/a	Nominated
1994	Country Music Association	Female Vocalist of the Year	—N/a	Won
1994	Grammy Awards	Grammy Award for Best Country Collaboration with Vocals	"Romeo" (Note: With Mary Chapin Carpenter, Billy Ray Cyrus, Kathy Mattea, Dolly Parton, and Tanya Tucker)	Nominated
1995	Academy of Country Music	Top Female Vocalist	—N/a	Nominated
1995	Country Music Association	Female Vocalist of the Year	—N/a	Nominated
1996	Country Music Association	Female Vocalist of the Year	—N/a	Nominated
1996	Grammy Awards	Grammy Award for Best Female Country Vocal Performance	"Mi Vida Loca (My Crazy Life)"	Nominated
1997	Academy of Country Music	Song of the Year	"All the Good Ones Are Gone"	Nominated
1997	Country Music Association	Female Vocalist of the Year	—N/a	Nominated
1997	Country Music Association	Music Video of the Year	"All the Good Ones Are Gone"	Nominated
1997	Country Music Association	Single of the Year	"All the Good Ones Are Gone"	Nominated
1998	Academy of Country Music	Vocal Event of the Year	"Same Old Train" (Note: With Clint Black, Joe Diffie, Merle Haggard, Emmylou Harris, Alison Krauss, Patty Loveless, Earl Scruggs, Ricky Skaggs, Marty Stuart, Randy Travis, Travis Tritt, and Dwight Yoakam)	Nominated
1998	Grammy Awards	Grammy Award for Best Female Country Vocal Performance	"All the Good Ones Are Gone"	Nominated
1999	Country Music Association	Vocal Event of the Year	"Same Old Train"	Nominated
1999	Grammy Awards	Grammy Award for Best Country Collaboration with Vocals	"Same Old Train"	Won
2012	International Bluegrass Music Awards	Song of the Year	"Somewhere South of Crazy"	Nominated
2022	Nashville Songwriters Hall of Fame	Contemporary Songwriter/Artist	—N/a	Nominated

== Filmography ==
Filmography
Year	Title	Role	Notes	Reference
1993	The Thing Called Love	Herself	Film; cameo	
1993	L.A. Law	Amanda Hopewell	Television; Episode "Bourbon Cowboy"	
1998	Promised Land	Kate Matthews	Television; Episode "Total Security"	
1998	Diagnosis: Murder	Kate Matthews	Television; Episode "Promises to Keep"	
2012	RuPaul's Drag Race	Herself	Television; Episode "Dragazines"	
2013–2018	Nashville	Herself	Television; 7 episodes	
2024	The Neon Highway	Herself	Film	
