= Good humor =

Good humor or good humour, may refer to:

- Good Humor, a U.S. brand of ice cream
  - Good Humor Bar, an ice cream bar that originated the ice cream brand Good Humor
  - Good Humor-Breyers, a U.S. food corporation that makes the "Good Humor" ice cream brand
- Good Humor (album), a 1998 album by Saint-Etienne
- Good Humour, a 1991 album by Stephen Cummings
- Good Humor (Hot Stylz album)
- Good Humor Party, a global satirical organization founded in Poland, with some political party affiliates

== See also ==
- The Good-Humoured Ladies, a ballet
- The Good Humor Man (disambiguation)
