= This Wonderful Life =

Studio album by Stephen Cummings
- Released: August 1986
- Genre: Rock, pop
- Length: 36:49
- Label: Centre Records, Polydor Records
- Producer: Stephen Cummings

Stephen Cummings chronology
Senso (1984)	This Wonderful Life (1986)	Lovetown (1988)

Singles from This Wonderful Life
- 1. "Speak with Frankness" Released: June 1986; 2. "Love Is Crucial But Money, That's Everything" Released: November 1986

This Wonderful Life is the second studio album by Australian singer-songwriter Stephen Cummings. The album was released in August 1986 and peaked at number 69 on the Australian Kent Music Report.

== Writing and recording ==
Cummings said, "I produced the record myself in a small studio in Melbourne and I did it in 12 days - recorded and mixed. It's the first album I've ever done where I followed it through right from the start. Writing the songs at home, organising it all. The people on it are all friends from Melbourne.

All of the songs were co-written by Cummings. His fellow writers included Andrew Pendlebury from the Sports, Dean Richards from Whirlywirld and Ian Stephens from the Slaughtermen.

Cummings also wrote the publicity blurb for the album, which started, "It's a complete album, a solid listen, yet each song tells its own story, a burning, a yearning, like Carl Gustav Jung letting it all hang out, baby, at the Copacabana, like the Darker Side of Barry Manilow.

== Reception ==
Toby Creswell from Rolling Stone Australia said "There is a strength that runs through this album which saves the sentiment from becoming maudlin. While Cummings' characters could easily sound resigned, they instead sound strong in their lonesomeness. Cummings' singing sounds stronger than it has in some years and he has a control over the material, exhibiting a dexterity that hasn't been in evidence since the Sports recorded Don't Throw Stones many years ago. Ultimately This Wonderful Life is not a record destined for an immediate impact on the charts. It's too modern, sophisticated, intelligent and passionate for that."

== Track listing ==
Side A
No.	Title	Writer(s)	Length
1.	"Speak with Frankness"	Stephen Cummings; Andrew Pendlebury	3:12
2.	"Forbidden Territory"	Cummings; Don Nadi	4:16
3.	"I Can't Face the Day"	Cummings; Peter Crosby	3:34
4.	"Love Is Crucial But Money, That's Everything"	Cummings; Dean Richards	4:00
5.	"Where Is She Now"	Cummings; Nadi	3:57

Side B
No.	Title	Writer(s)	Length
1.	"This Wonderful Life"	Cummings; Ian Stephen	3:04
2.	"This Is The Way"	Cummings; Crosby	4:20
3.	"Love Streams"	Cummings; Pendlebury	3:45
4.	"In Siege of Robert Mitchum"	Cummings; Richards	3:26
5.	"Ten Very Sad Songs"	Cummings; Richards	2:55

== Charts ==
Chart (1986)	Peak position
Australian Album Kent Music Report	69

== Release history ==
Region	Date	Label	Format	Catalogue
Australia	August 1986	Centre Records	Vinyl, cassette	829725-1
