= Senso (Stephen Cummings album) =

- 1984 album cover

Studio album by Stephen Cummings
- Released: August 1984
- Recorded: EMI Studios 301
- Genre: Electronic, rock, pop
- Length: 38:55
- Label: Warner Music Group, Regular Records
- Producer: Martin Armiger

Stephen Cummings chronology
Senso (1984)	This Wonderful Life (1986)

Singles from Senso
- 1. "We All Make Mistakes" Released: December 1982; 2. "Stuck on Love" Released: May 1983; 3. "Backstabbers" Released: December 1983; 4. "Gymnasium" Released: 2 July 1984; 5. "Another Kick in the Head" Released: October 1984

Senso is the debut studio album by Australian singer-songwriter Stephen Cummings, released in 1984. The album spawned the singles "We All Make Mistakes", "Stuck on Love", "Backstabbers", "Gymnasium", and "Another Kick in the Head". It peaked at number 46 on the Australian Kent Music Report. The album was re-released on CD in 1992. In 2007, the album was re-reissued with This Wonderful Life.

== Reception ==
Toby Crewel from Rolling Stone Australia gave the album 4 1/2 out of 5, saying "Senso is superficially a collection of romance songs slanted towards the slower numbers. However with repeated listenings it becomes much more than that – it's one of those rare records which reveals new depths and new delights with each spin." adding "Lyrically the songs move from melancholic rapture to ecstatic reverie with paranoia, viciousness and quiet determination in there somewhere as well. Cummings delivers them with more confidence than he showed on The Sports records and he seems especially comfortable with the strong female harmonies and duets. His phrasing has never been better, his voice is more mature and his control more supple. He still loves to twist words out of shape and squeeze nuance from his vocal melody but he rarely mangles the lyric as has happened in the past."

== Track listings ==
Side A
No.	Title	Writer(s)	Length
1.	"Gymnasium"	Stephen Cummings; Martin Armiger	3:36
2.	"Another Kick in the Head"	Martin Armiger	4:02
3.	"Walking Out the Door"	Cummings; Armiger	3:12
4.	"My Mission Tonight"	Cummings; Andrew Pendlebury	2:56
5.	"The Company Turns Ugly"	Cummings; Ian Stephen	4:07

Side B
No.	Title	Writer(s)	Length
1.	"Only a Lonely Man"	Ivy Jo Hunter; Beatrice Verdi	3:27
2.	"Stuck on Love"	Cummings; Stephen	4:11
3.	"This Feeling Will Survive"	Cummings; Stephen	3:55
4.	"Almost"	Cummings; Stephen	3:28
5.	"Backstabbers"	Leon Huff; Gene McFadden; John Whitehead	3:20
6.	"I Won't Give Up Your Love"	Cummings; Stephen	4:01

=== 1992 reissue ===
No.	Title	Writer(s)	Length
1.	"Gymnasium"	Martin Armiger, Stephen Cummings	3:54
2.	"Another Kick in the Head"	Martin Armiger	3:55
3.	"Walking Out the Door"	Martin Armiger, Stephen Cummings	3:12
4.	"My Mission Tonight"	Andrew Pendlebury, Stephen Cummings	2:56
5.	"The Company Turns Ugly"	Ian Stephen, Stephen Cummings	4:07
6.	"We All Make Mistakes"	Ian Stephen, Stephen Cummings	3:51
7.	"Only a Lonely Man"	Beatrice Verdi, Ivy Jo Hunter	3:27
8.	"Stuck on Love"	Stephen Cummings, Ian Stephen	4:11
9.	"This Feeling Will Survive"	Stephen Cummings, Ian Stephen	3:55
10.	"Almost"	Stephen Cummings, Ian Stephen	3:28
11.	"Backstabbers"	Gene McFadden, John Whitehead, Leon Huff	3:20
12.	"I Won't Give Up Your Love"	Stephen Cummings, Ian Stephen	4:01
Total length:			44:07

=== 2007 reissue ===
Bonus tracks
No.	Title	Writer(s)	Length
12.	"Gymnasium" (Mega Dance Mix)	Stephen Cummings, Martin Armiger	5:10
13.	"We All Make Mistakes"	Stephen Cummings, Ian Stephen	3:50
14.	"Backstabbers" (Extended Dance Mix)	Gene McFadden, John Whitehead, Leon Huff	5:29
Total length:			55:01

== Charts ==
Chart (1984)	Peak position
Australian Album Kent Music Report	46

== Release history ==
Region	Date	Label	Format	Catalogue
Australia	August 1984	Regular Records	Vinyl	RRLP-1208
Australia	1992	Regular Records, Warner Music Australia	CD	D19574

== Personnel ==
- Arranged by (brass arrangements) – Greg Flood
- Stephen Cummings - Vocals
- Joe Creighton - Bass, Additional vocals
- Mark Ferry - Bass
- Vince Jones - Cornet (solo)
- Martin Armiger - Drum programming (Drumulator), Guitar, Keyboards
- Peter Luscombe - Drums
- Andrew Pendlebury - Guitar
- Robert Goodge - Guitar
- Duncan Veal - Keyboards
- Jantra de Vilda - Keyboards
- Stephen Bigger - Keyboards
- Ricky Fataar - Percussion
- Wilbur Wilde - Saxophone Solo on "Walking Out The Door"
- Joe Camilleri - Saxophone Solo on "Another Kick in the Head"
- Venetta Fields - Additional vocals
- Nick Smith - Additional vocals
- Linda Nutter - Additional vocals
- Nick Smith - Additional vocals
- Stephanie Sproul - Additional vocals
