= Stuck in Love =

Stuck in Love may refer to:

- Stuck in Love (film), a 2012 film
- "Stuck in Love" (song), a 2000 song by the Judds

== See also ==
- "Stuck on Love", a 1983 song by Stephen Cummings
