= Escapist (album) =

Studio album by Stephen Cummings
- Released: September 1996
- Studio: Karmic Hit, Sydney, Australia
- Length: 52:36
- Label: Polydor Records
- Producer: Steve Kilbey

Stephen Cummings chronology
Falling Swinger (1994)	Escapist (1996)	Puppet Pauper Pirate Poet Pawn & King (1997)

Singles from The Escapist
- 1. "Sometimes" Released: May 1996; 2. "Taken by Surprise" Released: August 1996

Escapist is the eighth studio album by Australian singer-songwriter Stephen Cummings. The album was released in September 1996.

Cummings said "The story behind the recording of The Escapist is interesting, I can only liken it to having a 21st birthday party. You invite along all your friends and abruptly realise just how dissimilar your friends are. You start to despair and fret they won't come together and be friendly. In the end, common sense prevailed."

At the ARIA Music Awards of 1996 the album was nominated for Best Adult Contemporary Album.

== Reception ==
Mitchell Peters from Time Off, gave the album 3.5 out of 5 criticising the lead single but said "The rest of the album is beautifully played and drips with maturity, grace and a strange hypnotic style." Chris Johnston from Rolling Stone Australia gave the album 3.5 out of 5 saying "To follow up last year's acclaimed and adventurous Falling Swinger, the strictly-Melbourne Stephen Cummings releases Escapist, his eighth solo album. Escapist continues the experimentation of Falling Swinger by again enlisting errant Church main man Steve Kilbey as producer and collaborator." Antonino Tati from Beat magazine gave the album 9 out of 10 saying "Cummings' compositions... are awe-inspiring with their lyrical themes often found to be down in the dumps, but their musical themes as celestial as an endless bright blue sky." Barry Divola from Who Weekly gave the album a score of B− saying "Downbeat and simple, Escapist isn't always the quiet achiever it should be. Cummings has one of those conspiratorial voices that whispers in your ear, but some of the songs are too flat, and need more of a sting to grab the listener." Jeff Jenkins from TV Week gave the album 4 out of 5 saying "Stephen Cummings remains Australia's finest singer and songwriter on Escapist." adding "He's following his own eclectic path, and it's a journey that has jazz, country and dance influences." Scott Howlett from X Press Magazine said "Escapist... is a rich album of 'songs' – good songs – but none which immediately register as essential cuts. Sadly, for Cummings, it's another good album which unfortunately is not 'great' enough to impress as being 'the breakthrough' from the somewhat obscure plateau he's been standing upon since the demise of The Sports in 1981."

== Track listing ==
No.	Title	Writer(s)	Length
1.	"You're a Dream"	Jeff Burstin; Stephen Cummings	5:07
2.	"Taken By Surprise"	Karin Jansson; Stephen Kilbey	3:25
3.	"Sometimes"	Cummings; Jansson; Kilbey	4:17
4.	"Midnight in America"	Kilbey	3:51
5.	"When God Is in Heaven"	Cummings; Robert Goodge	5:30
6.	"The Brighter the Light"	Chris Abrahams; Cummings	4:03
7.	"Pretty Big Crush"	Cummings; Goodge	4:24
8.	"I Will Follow You"	Cummings; Goodge	4:46
9.	"Sleep With Me"	Kilbey	3:52
10.	"The Lost Girl"	Cummings; Goodge	5:02
11.	"Anyone"	Cummings; Kilbey	3:52
12.	"Everything Breaks Your Heart"	Burstin; Cummings	4:27

== Release history ==
Region	Date	Label	Format	Catalogue
Australia	September 1996	Polydor Records	CD, Cassette	531840 2
