= A New Kind of Blue =

Studio album by Stephen Cummings
- Released: March 1989
- Venue: Platinum Studios, Melbourne
- Genre: Rock
- Length: 49:16
- Label: EMI, True Tone, Polydor
- Producer: Shane O'Mara, Stephen Cummings

Stephen Cummings chronology
Lovetown (1988)	A New Kind of Blue (1989)	Good Humour (1991)

Singles from A New Kind of Blue
- 1. "A Life Is a Life" Released: November 1988; 2. "Your House Is Falling" Released: March 1989; 3. "When the Day Is Done" Released: June 1989

A New Kind of Blue is the fourth studio album by Australian singer-songwriter Stephen Cummings. The album was released in March 1989 and peaked at number 53 on the Australian ARIA Charts.

At the ARIA Music Awards of 1990, the album was nominated for three awards, winning Best Adult Contemporary Album.

== Reception ==
Lynden Barber from Sydney Morning Herald said the album "sets a new standard of maturity for Australian pop" adding "A New Kind of Blue is a record that takes some time to smoulder its way into your affections, but once there, it glows like embers on a winter's fire. This is suave, adult music that bears the intimacy of confessions whispered in the early hours. Australia – or anywhere else, for that matter – is unlikely to hear a record as gracefully accomplished in the whole of 1989."

Clinton Walker from Rolling Stone Australia gave the album 4 out of 5 saying "A New Kind of Blue is luscious. Even when the melodies aren't arresting in their own right, Cummings knows, and uses well, the power of the gospelesque chorus, to lift them. The instrumentation and arrangements – mostly by O'Mara – are discrete and tasteful to a tee, and Cummings' tenor has that almost cracked, smokey allure."

== Track listing ==
No.	Title	Writer(s)	Length
1.	"When the Day Is Done"	Stephen Cummings; Joe Camilleri	4:26
2.	"A Life Is a Life"	Cummings; Dean Richards	3:18
3.	"Screwed Up State of Affairs"	Cummings; Richards	3:45
4.	"Running Away"	Cummings; Andrew Pendlebury	3:58
5.	"Your House Is Falling"	Cummings; Pendlebury	3:34
6.	"Melancholy Hour"	Cummings; Shane O'Mara	4:24
7.	"Silent As the Grave"	Cummings	3:53
8.	"When Love Comes"	Cummings; O"Mara; Colin Talbot	3:40
9.	"Carrying a Torch for You (For Years)"	Cummings; O'Mara	4:18
10.	"Come On, Come On"	Cummings; Pendlebury	3:41
11.	"Here Where the Sky Is Blue" (CD bonus track)		3:23
12.	"Questions" (CD bonus track)		3:43
13.	"The Last Thing" (CD bonus track)		3:13

== Charts ==
Chart performance for A New Kind of Blue
Chart (1989)	Peak position
Australian Albums (ARIA)	53

== Release history ==
Region	Date	Label	Format	Catalogue
Australia	March 1989	True Tone Records, EMI Music	Vinyl, CD	791309
