= Falling Swinger =

Studio album by Stephen Cummings
- Released: August 1994
- Recorded: March 1994
- Studio: Karmic Hit Studios, Sydney, Australia
- Length: 58:37
- Label: Polydor Records
- Producer: Steve Kilbey

Stephen Cummings chronology
Rollercoaster (1993)	Falling Swinger (1994)	Escapist (1996)

Singles from Falling Swinger
- 1. "13 September/White Noise" Released: 1994; 2. "The Big Room" Released: 1994; 3. "Fell from a Great Height" Released: 1995

Falling Swinger is the seventh studio album by Australian singer-songwriter Stephen Cummings. The album was released in August 1994.

The album was listed in Rolling Stone Australia's list of "100 Essential Australian albums".

== Reception ==
Shaun Carney from Rolling Stone Australia gave the album 4 out of 5 stars, saying that "Cummings has, during the past 10 years, made several truly great, if underappreciated, albums. This could well be his best.", adding "Without doubt, the album, produced by Steve Kilbey, is a bold departure for [Cummings]. Kilbey appears to have viewed Cummings' talent as being something potentially lighter than air and has loosened the performer's moorings. This has enabled Cummings to drift upwards, into a world of soundscapes, transforming his approach to songs and singing and allowing him to finally shuck off the last discernible traces of his influences. Falling Swinger sees Cummings as a man liberated from his time and his age."

Jon Casimir from the Sydney Morning Herald said that "This is the best album Stephen Cummings has ever made. It's also the best local album of 1994. Falling Swinger is a drifting, dreamy travelogue, a collection of carefully realised, intoxicating visions", adding that "Produced by The Church's Steve Kilbey, it displays a revitalised, refocused and realigned Cummings, bursting with creativity."

Toby Creswell from Juice magazine said that "the tunes range from raw confessions to cooked commercial pop ... sublime, Cummings at his best".

== Track listing ==
No.	Title	Writer(s)	Length
1.	"The Big Room"	Stephen Cummings	6:10
2.	"White Noise"	Cummings; Shane O'Mara	4:00
3.	"13 September"	Steve Kilbey	3:21
4.	"Fell from a Great Height"	Cummings; Bill McDonald	4:05
5.	"As I Rise"	Cummings; Bill McDonald	6:00
6.	"What the Eyes Have Made Welcome"	Cummings; Chris Abrahams	4:13
7.	"A River Lies Between Us"	Cummings; O'Mara	4:13
8.	"100 Different Ways"	Cummings; O'Mara	3:49
9.	"I Wish the Show Was Over"	Cummings	4:20
10.	"Days Chasing Days"	Cummings; Abrahams	5:23
11.	"Sliding Across a Blue Highway"	Cummings; Jeff Burstin	4:39
12.	"What Was There to Worry About"	Cummings	3:35
13.	"God Knows"	Cummings; O'Mara	4:19
14.	"Fell from a Great Height (1995 re-release bonus track) " (with Toni Childs)	Cummings; McDonald

== Release history ==
Region	Date	Label	Format	Catalogue
Australia	August 1994	Polydor Records	CD, Cassette	523355 2
Australia	1995	Polydor Records	CD, Cassette	527456 2
