= What Am I Going to Do? =

Single by Stephen Cummings
- B-side: "Not Afraid"
- Released: July 1985
- Genre: Rock, Pop
- Length: 3:59
- Label: Regular Records, Warner Music Group
- Songwriters: Stephen Cummings, Peter Crosbie
- Producer: Alan Mansfield

Stephen Cummings singles chronology
"Another Kick in the Head" (1984)	"What Am I Going to Do?" (1985)	"Speak with Frankness" (1986)

"What Am I Going to Do?" is a song recorded by Australian singer-songwriter Stephen Cummings, released in the year 1985 through the label Regular Records. The song charted at number 80 on the ARIA Charts.

== Track listing ==
7"
No.	Title	Writer(s)	Length
1.	"What Am I Going To Do?"	Stephen Cummings, Peter Crosbie	3:59
2.	"Not Afraid"	Stephen Cummings

== Charts ==
Chart (1985)	Peak position
Australia (Kent Music Report)	80
