= Unguided Tour =

Studio album by Stephen Cummings
- Released: August 1992
- Genre: Rock
- Length: 49:36
- Producer: Shane O'Mara, Stephen Cummings

Stephen Cummings chronology
Good Humour (1991)	Unguided Tour (1992)	Rollercoaster (1993)

Singles from Unguided Tour
- 1. "Keep the Ball Rolling" Released: August 1992; 2. "Didn't Anybody Ever Say No to You" Released: October 1992; 3. "I've Got a Lot of Faith in You" Released: January 1993

Unguided Tour is the sixth studio album by Australian singer-songwriter Stephen Cummings. The album was released in August 1992 and peaked at number 76 on the Australian ARIA Charts.

== Reception ==
Mike Daly from The Age said "Stephen Cummings plays the melancholia game more convincingly than any other Australian singer/songwriter. On Unguided Tour he is at it again, full of recriminations and regrets, addressing lost loves and shadowy memories. But his is a dry-eyed perspective in which, however gloomy the emotional landscape, a flicker of ironic humor illuminates the horizon."

Greg Taylor from Rolling Stone Magazine gave the album 4 out of 5 calling it "One of the best recent outings, any weight, any distance." adding "Unguided Tour sees Cummings returning to a sparser style than his recent, more funkier, albums. The songs range from sardonic views of the world ... and complicated joy, but all the time it is the voice and the impeccable delivery that makes a Stephen Cummings album so special – and Unguided Tour is a very special album"

== Track listing ==
No.	Title	Writer(s)	Length
1.	"Uncrowned"	Stephen Cummings; Shane O'Mara	3:46
2.	"Keep the Ball Rolling"	Cummings; O'Mara	3:37
3.	"I Hope She's Happy Now"	Cummings; O'Mara	3:52
4.	"Walk Softly, Carry a Big Stick"	Cummings; O'Mara	4:49
5.	"Two By Two"	Cummings; O'Mara	3:47
6.	"Everybodys Always Pissing in the Swimming Pool"	Cummings; O'Mara	4:28
7.	"She's Too Dumb to Care"	Cummings	2:58
8.	"Didn't Anybody Ever Say No to You Before"	Cummings; O'Mara	3:57
9.	"I've Got a Lot of Faith in You"	Cummings; O'Mara	4:10
10.	"Rise & Fall"	Cummings; O'Mara	4:13
11.	"Like a Shadow"	Cummings; O'Mara	4:14
12.	"Play It as It Lays"	Cummings; O'Mara	3:40
13.	"When It Rains Outside"	Chris Abrahams; Cummings	2:05

== Charts ==
Chart performance for Unguided Tour
Chart (1992)	Peak position
Australian Albums (ARIA)	76

== Release history ==
Region	Date	Label	Format	Catalogue
Australia	August 1992	Polydor Records	CD, Cassette	5138522
