= Gymnasium (song) =

Single by Stephen Cummings

from the album Senso
- B-side: "Much Too Much"
- Released: 2 July 1984
- Genre: Rock
- Length: 3:36; 5:11 (Mega Dance Mix)
- Label: Regular Records, Warner Music Group
- Songwriters: Stephen Cummings, Martin Armiger
- Producer: Martin Armiger

Stephen Cummings singles chronology
"Backstabbers" (1983)	"Gymnasium" (1984)	"Another Kick in the Head" (1984)

"Gymnasium" is a song by Australian singer-songwriter Stephen Cummings. "Gymnasium" was released in July 1984 as the fourth single from Cummings' debut studio album Senso. The song reached number 27 on the Australian singles chart.

At the 1984 Countdown Music Awards, the song earned Cummings a nomination for Best Male Performance in a Video.

== Background ==
After the breakup of The Sports in 1981, Cummings, Armiger and Pendlebury soon found themselves together again, working on Cummings' first solo album Senso with Armiger taking up the role of producer.

== Track listing ==
7"
No.	Title	Writer(s)	Length
1.	"Gymnasium"	Stephen Cummings, Martin Armiger	3:36
2.	"Much Too Much"	Stephen Cummings	3:22

12"
No.	Title	Writer(s)	Length
1.	"Gymnasium (Mega Dance Mix)"	Stephen Cummings, Martin Armiger	5:11
2.	"Much Too Much"	Cummings	3:22
3.	"When In Rome"	Carolyn Leigh, Cy Coleman	2:46

== Personnel ==
- Arranged by (brass arrangements) – Greg Flood
- Joe Creighton - Bass, Additional vocals
- Mark Ferry - Bass
- Vince Jones - Cornet (solo)
- Martin Armiger - Drum programming (Drumulator), Guitar, Keyboards
- Peter Luscombe - Drums
- Andrew Pendlebury - Guitar
- Robert Goodge - Guitar
- Duncan Veal - Keyboards
- Jantra de Vilda - Keyboards
- Stephen Bigger - Keyboards
- Ricky Fataar - Percussion
- Venetta Fields - Additional vocals
- Nick Smith - Additional vocals
- Linda Nutter - Additional vocals
- Nick Smith - Additional vocals
- Stephanie Sproul - Additional vocals

== Charts ==
Chart (1984–1985)	Peak position
Australia (Kent Music Report)	27
