= The Good Humor Man =

The Good Humor Man may refer to:

- a salesman of Good Humor ice cream bars
- The Good Humor Man (1950 film), a crime comedy starring Jack Carson
- The Good Humor Man (2005 film), a romantic drama featuring Nathan Stevens and Cameron Richardson
- "The Good Humor Man He Sees Everything Like This", a song from the Love album Forever Changes

== See also ==
- Good humor (disambiguation)
