= Slaughtermen (band) =

The Slaughtermen
- Origin: Melbourne, Victoria, Australia
- Genres: Post-punk
- Years active: 1984–1989; 1994–1995
- Labels: Au Go Go; Cleopatra; Agape; Massive
- Past members: see Members below

The Slaughtermen were an Australian post-punk band, formed in Melbourne in 1984.

== History ==
Founder members of The Slaughtermen were Rob Eastcott (piano), Mark Ferrie (bass guitar, vocals), Jans Friedenfelds (aka Johnny Crash, drums; ex-JAB, Models, Sacred Cowboys), Pierre Jaquinot (guitar), Peter Linden (pedal steel) and Ian Stephen (vocals, keyboards). Ferrie and Stephen were later joined by Andrew Pendlebury (ex-The Sports; lead guitar, vocals), Terry Doolan (ex-Sacred Cowboys; rhythm guitar, vocals), and Des Hefner (ex-The Birthday Party; drums, vocals). The band's first single, "God's Not Dead" b/w "Jesus Saves White Trash", was released on the Au Go Go label in 1986. This was followed by 1987's Still Lovin' You LP on the Cleopatra Records label, and 1988's Melbourne, Memphis and the Mansion in the Sky LP on the Agape label. The Slaughtermen gained a following playing revved up versions of southern gospel songs and barroom country classics at inner city rock venues in Sydney and Melbourne between 1985 and 1988.

The band held a one-year residency at the Rising Sun Hotel in Melbourne. During this period, singer Stephen purchased a "Reverend" title for twenty-five dollars from a religious organization advertised in the ''National Enquirer''.

Memphis and a Mansion, and were replaced by Tony Thornton, (drums) and Martin Lubran (lead guitar and pedal steel).

After a lacklustre Sydney tour in 1988 the band ceased performing and released Jesus Can't Remember in April 1989 as a 12" EP. Later in 1989, Stephen formed the Ian Stephen Band and released solo material. In 1994 The Slaughtermen reconvened for a series of performances in Melbourne, and released a CD, Gospel Gold, on the Massive label in 1995. This 20 track disc featured live recordings of their gospel material culled from the Live Naturally album and various sound board recordings. In 1997, 2007 and 2009 the original members reformed for one-off concerts in Melbourne. In May 2012 The Slaughtermen announced performances in Melbourne for the coming August.

The Slaughtermen performed in August 2013 at the Caravan Club, Oakleigh, Victoria. Following the last song of the evening the band announced that it would no longer perform "Jesus Saves White Trash". The Slaughtermen performed twice in Sept 2014, in Melbourne, at Tago Mago in Thornbury and The Caravan Club in Oakleigh. The band once again revisited "Jesus Saves White Trash" due to many requests by the audience.

== Members ==
- Rob Eastcott – piano (1984)
- Mark Ferrie – bass, vocals (1984–1987, 1989, 1994–1995)
- Jans Freidenfelds – drums (1984)
- Pierre Jaquinot – guitar (1984)
- Peter Linden – pedal steel (1984)
- Ian Stephen – vocals, piano, organ (1984–1989, 1994–1995)
- Andrew Pendlebury – guitar, vocals (1985–1987 1994–1995)
- Terry Doolan – guitar, vocals (1986–87, 1989, 1994–1995)
- Des Hefner – drums (1986–1988, 1994–1995)
- Martin Lubran – pedal steel, guitar (1989)
- Tony Thornton – drums (1989)

== Discography ==
=== Singles ===
- "God's Not Dead"/"Jesus Saves White Trash" - Au Go Go (ANDA 046) (June 1986)
- "Jesus Can't Remember"/"Jesus Can't Remember" (Instrumental) - Agape (April 1989)

=== Albums ===
- Live Naturally - Cleopatra (1986) (Cassette)and LP.
- Still Lovin' You - Cleopatra (CLP220) (1987)
- Melbourne, Memphis and a Mansion in the Sky Agape (1988)
- Gospel Gold - Massive (1995)
- Temptation - Endtime (30 May 2007)
