= Puppet Pauper Pirate Poet Pawn & King =

Compilation album by Stephen Cummings
- Released: October 1997
- Length: 72:47
- Label: Polydor Records

Stephen Cummings chronology
Escapist (1996)	Puppet Pauper Pirate Poet Pawn & King (1997)	Spiritual Bum (1999)

Puppet, Pauper, Pirate, poet, Pawn and King is the second greatest hits album by Australian singer-songwriter Stephen Cummings. The album was released in October 1997.

== Reception ==
Bernard Zuel from Sydney Morning Herald gave the album 4 out of 5 saying "These are soul songs of Melbourne.. of the literate and the tongue-tied. Of all of us, really."

Peter Jordan from Sydney Morning Herald said "Despite relative anonymity and an absence from the charts, Cummings has produced an outstanding body of work that, in its maturity, style and consistency, is unique in Australian popular music. This "Best Of" compilation covers more than a decade of solo work, but also includes three new songs. The material ranges from the aching and fragile beauty of 'I Fell From a Great Height' to the almost psychedelic reverie of 'Sometimes' and the country-tinged 'When Love Comes Back to Haunt You'.

Jason Ankeny from AllMusic gave the album 4 out of 5 describing the album as "a compilation of ex-Sports frontman Stephen Cummings' somber solo work, highlighted by the melancholy 'I Fell from a Great Height', "Slowly Going to Pieces" and "When Love Comes Back to Haunt You."

== Track listing ==
No.	Title	Writer(s)	Length
1.	"Slowly Going to Pieces" (featuring Renée Geyer)	Stephen Cummings; Robert Goodge	4:09
2.	"I've Got a Lot of Faith in You"	Cummings; Shane O'Mara	4:10
3.	"Taken By Surprise"	Karin Jensson; Steve Kilbey	3:25
4.	"Keep the Ball Rolling"	Kilbey	3:37
5.	"I Fell from a Great Height"	Cummings; Bill McDonald	4:05
6.	"She Set Fire to the House"	Cummings; Andrew Pendlebury	5:00
7.	"You're a Dream"	Jeff Burstin; Cummings	5:07
8.	"13 September"	Kilbey	3:21
9.	"Sometimes"	Cummings; Jennson; Kilbey	4:17
10.	"You Jane"	Cummings	4:23
11.	"Melancholy Hour"	Cummings; O'Mara	4:24
12.	"Walk Softly But Carry a Big Stick"	Cummings; O'Mara	4:49
13.	"The Blue Hour"	Chris Abrahams; Cummings	4:43
14.	"When Love Comes Back to Haunt You"	Cummings; O'Mara	3:40
15.	"Somewhere"	Cummings; McDonald	5:07
16.	"The Big Room"	Cummings	4:55
17.	"Whatever Love Is"	Cummings; Goodge	4:30
18.	"Waiting for a Train" (featuring Renee Geyer)	Harry Vanda; George Young	4:12

== Release history ==
Region	Date	Label	Format	Catalogue
Australia	October 1997	Polydor Records	CD, Cassette	537883-2
