= Hell (You've Put Me Through) =

Single by Stephen Cummings

from the album Good Humour
- Released: November 1990
- Venue: Platinum Studios, Melbourne
- Length: 3:36
- Label: Polydor Records, True Tone
- Songwriter(s): Stephen Cummings, Robert Goodge
- Producer(s): Stephen Cummings, Robert Goodge, Shane O'Mara

Stephen Cummings singles chronology
"When the Day Is Done" (1989)	"Hell (You've Put Me Through)" (1990)	"Family Affair" (1991)

"Hell (You've Put Me Through)" is a song by Australian singer-songwriter Stephen Cummings and released in November 1990 as the lead single from Cummings' fifth studio album Good Humour. The song peaked at number 33 on the Australia ARIA Charts in February 1991.

At the ARIA Music Awards of 1991, the song earned Cummings a nomination for Best Male Artist.

== Track listing ==
Single
No.	Title	Length
1.	"Hell (You've Put Me Through)"	3:36
2.	"I Promise Not to Come"	2:20

Remixes
No.	Title	Length
1.	"Hell (You've Put Me Through)" (7" Version)	3:44
2.	"Hell (You've Put Me Through)" (12" Version)	6:15

== Charts ==
Chart (1990/91)	Peak position
Australia (ARIA)	33
