= Lovetown (album) =

Studio album by Stephen Cummings
- Released: January 1988
- Genre: Rock, pop, Alternative rock
- Label: Rampant Records
- Producer: Mark Woods, Stephen Cummings

Stephen Cummings chronology
This Wonderful Life (1986)	Lovetown (1988)	A New Kind of Blue (1989)

Singles from Lovetown
- 1. "She Sets Fire to the House" Released: September 1987; 2. "Some Prayers Are Answered" Released: February 1988; 3. "My Willingness" Released: May 1988

Lovetown is the third studio album by Australian singer-songwriter Stephen Cummings. The album was released in January 1988 and peaked at number 61 on the Australian Kent Music Report. The album was re-released in 1989 with an altered track list and four bonus tracks. The album is listed in the 100 Best Australian Albums.

== Reception ==
Ian McFarlane said "Lovetown was a very subtle, alluring, personal and mostly acoustic album. It was full of conversational, narrative vignettes from a world where the ironic title Lovetown certainly referred to Melbourne."

In its 1987 yearbook, Rolling Stone Australia said that "Lovetown was as uncluttered, heartfelt and impacting as only the best music can be." adding "The stripped back arrangements placed a strong emphasis on the song, and Cummings' voice. Here the predominantly Cummings/Pendlebury penned tunes stood up to the closest scrutiny. The lyrics on the brilliant 'Everybody Wants to Get to Heaven But Nobody Wants to Die", "She Set Fire to the House' and 'Push It Up All Fall Down' consistently hit the spot as they incisively documented relationships on the skids. These songs were made to be presented in a loose, and traditional format. They had a remarkable, timeless presence."

== Track listing ==
Side A
No.	Title	Writer(s)	Length
1.	"Everybody Wants to Get to Heaven But Nobody Wants to Die"	Stephen Cummings; Andrew Pendlebury	3:47
2.	"My Willingness"	Cummings; Pendlebury	4:24
3.	"If You Don't Want My Love"	Cummings; Dean Richards	2:59
4.	"When Trouble Comes"	Cummings; Pendlebury	3:33
5.	"Where Are You Going"	Cummings; Pendlebury	3:48

Side B
No.	Title	Writer(s)	Length
1.	"You Jane"	Cummings	4:23
2.	"Some Prayers Are Answered"	Cummings; Pendlebury	3:57
3.	"She Sets Fire to the House" (with Andrew Pendlebury)	Cummings; Pendlebury	4:51
4.	"Push It Up, All Falls Down"	Cummings; Pendlebury	3:00
5.	"Viva Las Vegas"	Doc Pomus; Mort Shuman	2:35

1989 Re-release

Side A
No.	Title	Writer(s)	Length
1.	"Everybody Wants to Get to Heaven But Nobody Wants to Die"	Stephen Cummings; Andrew Pendlebury
2.	"Some Prayers Are Answered"	Cummings; Pendlebury
3.	"If You Don't Want My Love"	Cummings; Dean Richards
4.	"When Trouble Comes"	Cummings; Pendlebury
5.	"Where Are You Going"	Cummings; Pendlebury
6.	"My Willingness"	Cummings; Pendlebury
7.	"You Jane"	Cummings
8.	"She Sets Fire to the House"	Cummings; Pendlebury
9.	"Push It Up, All Falls Down"	Cummings; Pendlebury
10.	"Viva Las Vegas"	Doc Pomus; Mort Shuman
11.	"Time to Kill"
12.	"She Set Fire to the House" (Electric)
13.	"Who Listens to the Radio '89"	Cummings; Pendlebury
14.	"Last Round Up"	Cummings; Joe Camilleri

== Charts ==
Chart (1988)	Peak position
Australian Album Kent Music Report	61

== Release history ==
Region	Date	Label	Format	Catalogue
Australia	January 1988	Rampant Records	Vinyl, cassette	RR052
Australia	1989	TrueTone Records	CD, cassette	CDP-793651
