= Will It Be Funny Tomorrow, Billy =

- Author: Stephen Cummings
- Language: English
- Subject: Stephen Cummings
- Genre: Non-fiction, memoir
- Publisher: Hardie Grant Books
- Publication date: 5 May 2009
- Publication place: Australia
- Media type: Hardcover, paperback, digital eBook
- Pages: 240 pages
- ISBN: 1740666437

Will It Be Funny Tomorrow, Billy is an autobiography by Australian singer-songwriter Stephen Cummings. The book is a collection of memoirist essays focussing on anecdotes of his childhood in the streets of Melbourne, of getting older and developing back problems, of the internal politics of rock bands and of the TV series Countdown.

The title is a reference to Billy Joel who once tried to reassure a nervous Cummings after his band The Sports messed up on stage in a hip New York club.

The book was turned into a film in 2014 under the title Don't Throw Stones.

== Reception ==
Jo Case from The Big Issue gave the book 4 out of 5 calling it "A highly entertaining ride through our recent musical past." Case said "This joyfully hyperactive memoir tells the story of an idiosyncratic life immersed in the local, national and international music scene." adding "He recalls battles with Michael Gudinski, writing notes to fellow snoop Helen Garner in a bandmate's diary, limousines in Los Angeles, ill-advised sex with housemates, touring with Split Enz, performing on Countdown and being jealous of Nick Cave".

Michael Dwyer said "Cummings structures his stories in discrete episodes that play loose with cause and effect. A chronology exists, from the gleeful anarchy of The Pelaco Brothers to the anxious expectations that drove and destroyed The Sports to diminishing cycles of solo success, but omissions are gaping and diversions in time, space and trains of thought are many.".
