= Stephen Cummings =

Australian singer and songwriter

- Born: Stephen Donald Cummings; 13 September 1954 (age 71); Melbourne, Victoria, Australia
- Genres: Rock, rockabilly, country swing, R&B, new wave
- Occupations: Singer; songwriter
- Years active: 1974–present
- Labels: Ralph, Missing Link Records, Phantom Records, Regular

Stephen Donald Cummings (born 13 September 1954) is an Australian rock singer and songwriter. He was the lead singer of Melbourne-based rock band the Sports from 1976 to 1981, followed by a solo career which has met with critical acclaim but has had limited commercial success. He has written two novels, Wonderboy (1996) and Stay Away from Lightning Girl (1999), and a memoir, Will It Be Funny Tomorrow, Billy (2009). In 2014 a documentary film, Don't Throw Stones, based on his memoir premiered as part of the Melbourne International Film Festival.

== Early life ==
Cummings was born in 1954 in Melbourne and grew up in the suburb of Camberwell. He was the vocalist for Ewe and the Merinos.

== Career ==
=== The Pelaco Brothers ===
The Pelaco Brothers formed in 1974, with Cummings on vocals, Joe Camilleri on saxophone and vocals, Peter Lillie on guitar and vocals, Johnny Topper on bass guitar, Karl Wolfe on drums and Chris Worrall on guitar. They played "rock-a-billy, country swing and R&B which recalled American outfits like Commander Cody and His Lost Planet Airmen and Dan Hicks and his Hot Licks. Yet, the band's delivery presented a fiercely Australian outlook". Only existing for 18 months, they later included Ed Bates on guitar and Peter Martin on slide guitar, their posthumous releases were The Notorious Pelaco Brothers Show a live six-track Extended Play on the Ralph imprint (a completely different entity from the San Francisco label) in June 1977 and three studio tracks for a various artists release, The Autodrifters and The Relaxed Mechanics Meet The Fabulous Nudes and The Pelaco Bros, in June 1978 on Missing Link Records. The Pelaco Brothers disbanded in late 1975. Camilleri went on to form Jo Jo Zep & The Falcons, Lillie formed Relaxed Mechanics and Topper formed the Fabulous Nudes. Lillie, Topper and Wolfe were all in the Autodrifters. Meanwhile, Steve Cummings and Bates formed the Sports in 1976

=== The Sports ===
The Sports were a new wave band formed in 1976 by Cummings and former Pelaco Brothers bandmate Ed Bates, with Robert Glover (former Myriad) on bass guitar, Jim Niven on piano (former the Captain Matchbox Whoopee Band) with Paul Hitchins on drums. Their early sets contained covers of Chuck Berry, Billy Emerson, Don Covay, Company Caine and Graham Parker. Original songs, mostly written by Cummings and Bates, completed their sets. The Sports' debut recording was the EP Fair Game in early 1977. A friend in London posted the record to New Musical Express which declared it "Record Of The Week". Andrew Pendlebury (ex-Myriad) joined on guitar in August 1977 and assisted Cummings with songwriting. Cummings brought in Martin Armiger on guitar, vocals and songwriting to replace Bates in August 1978. The Sports had top 30 hits on the Australian Kent Music Report singles charts with "Don't Throw Stones" (1979), "Strangers on a Train" (1980) and "How Come" (1981); and top 20 albums with Don't Throw Stones (#9, 1979), Suddenly (No. 13, 1980) and Sondra (1981). "Who Listens to the Radio?", co-written by Cummings and Pendlebury, peaked at No. 35 on the Australian singles charts in 1978, and was their only hit on the United States Billboard pop singles chart, peaking at No. 45 in November 1979.

=== Solo career ===
After the Sports had disbanded in late 1981, Cummings formed a "part-time" band, A Ring of Truth, with Robert Glover (also the Sports), Peter Luscombe (Tinsley Waterhouse), Wilbur Wilde (Ol '55, Jo Jo Zep and the Falcons) and Les Stackpool (In-Focus). Stackpool was soon replaced by Peter Laffy (Mondo Rock). According to Tharunka's Diane Livesey, "[they were Cummings] way of relieving boredom for a while and inflicting 'the modern face of cabaret' upon an unsuspecting public ... The only way to describe them is 'truly wonderful'." By late March 1982, Cummings had left that group. He spent the rest of 1982 co-writing tracks with Ian Stephen and waiting out his contract. He released his debut solo single, "We all Make Mistakes" on Phantom Records, in December 1982 and followed with "Stuck on Love" in May 1983. Cummings' debut album, Senso, released by Regular Records in August 1984, was produced by former bandmate Martin Armiger, and recorded with session musicians including Armiger, Joe Camilleri and Pendlebury from his earlier bands. Senso spawned two dance-pop singles, "Gymnasium" in July 1984 and "Another Kick in the Head" in October.

His second studio album, This Wonderful Life, was released in August 1986. It was a more personal and less busy recording which was produced by Cummings and provided two singles, "Speak with Frankness" and "Love is Crucial". In September 1987, Cummings dueted with Pendlebury on "She Set Fire to the House". before releasing his third album, Lovetown in January 1988. Cummings formed Stephen Cummings' Lovetown (aka Stephen Cummings and Lovetown) with Rebecca Barnard on backing vocals, Mick Girasole (also in the Black Sorrows alongside Camilleri) on bass guitar, Peter Luscombe (also the Black Sorrows) on drums, Shane O'Mara on guitar and Pendlebury on guitar. It "was a very subtle, alluring, personal and mostly acoustic album ... full of conversational, narrative vignettes". The album, produced by Mark Woods and Cummings, provided two further singles, "Some Prayers Are Answered" in February and "My Willingness" in May.

Cummings changed labels to True Tone Records for his next album, A New Kind of Blue, which was released in March 1989 and produced by Cummings and O'Mara. It spawned three singles, "A Life is a Life" in October 1988, "Your House is Falling" in February 1989 and "When the Day is Done" in July. The album provided Cummings with his only Australian Recording Industry Association (ARIA) Award, winning "Best Adult Contemporary Album" in 1990.

For his fifth solo album, Good Humour, Cummings returned to his earlier dance and funk sound from his Senso album, using a backing band of Barnard, O'Mara and Nick Smith (ex-Kevins) on backing vocals, with additional session musicians from Sydney jazz outfit The Necks, and Robert Goodge (I'm Talking) on guitar, drum programming and co-production (for two tracks). The album, produced by Cummings and O'Mara, peaked at No. 40 on the ARIA Album Charts in March 1991. "Hell (You've Put Me Through)", which peaked at No. 33 after its November 1990 release, was followed by a cover of Sly Stone's "Family Affair" and then "Stand Up (Love is the Greatest)". Cummings has supplemented his income by writing advertising jingles: he co-wrote Medibank Private's theme "I Feel Better Now", with Goodge.

Cummings' sixth studio album, Unguided Tour, produced by Cummings and O'Mara for Polygram Records, was issued in August 1992 and provided three singles. The album peaked at number 76 on the ARIA Charts. In 1993, Cummings' first compilation album Rollercoaster was released.

In August 1994, Cummings' seventh solo album Falling Swinger was released. The single, "September 13" appeared in July and is titled for Cummings' birthday, which he shares with Steve Kilbey. Later in 1994, the Toni Childs and Cummings duet, "Fell from a Great Height", was released as a single. It later appeared on Childs' compilation album, The Very Best of Toni Childs in 1996.

Steve Kilbey also produced Cummings' eighth studio album Escapist, released in September 1996, which contained "countrified ballad "Everything Breaks Your Heart" to the psychedelic-tinged mantra "Sometimes". Also in 1996, Cummings published his first novel, Wonderboy, which deals with relationships especially those between a father and son.

On 14 November 1998, Cummings and, a briefly reformed, The Sports performed at the Mushroom Records 25th anniversary concert. His next solo album, Spiritual Bum, had Cummings as record producer and was issued in June 1999. He returned to an acoustic, melancholic sound. Cummings also had his second novel, Stay Away from Lightning Girl, published in 1999, which described an ageing musician and his band. In 2001, he released Skeleton Key followed by Firecracker in 2003, Close Ups in 2004, Love-O-Meter in 2005, Space Travel in 2007, and Happiest Man Alive in 2008. On 1 May 2009, his memoir, Will It Be Funny Tomorrow, Billy was printed, which his publishers described as a series of anecdotes from his childhood through thirty years of the music business and his family relationships. In October 2010, his 1988 album Lovetown was listed in the top 40 in the book, 100 Best Australian Albums.

In 2019, Cummings released his 20th studio album, Prisoner of Love. A four disc anthology album, titled A Life is a Life, was also released in 2019.

In February 2023, Cummings announced the forthcoming release of 100 Years from Now for 5 May 2023.

== Personal life ==
In March 2020, Cummings had a stroke, but partially recovered and began releasing work in 2023.

== Media reviews ==
Alongside Nick Cave and Tim Rogers, I would nominate Stephen Cummings. He is easily one of our great storytellers, capable of creating lives in miniature

— Bernard Zuel, The Sydney Morning Herald, 3 November 2001

Apart from Paul Kelly, no other Australian solo artist has managed to sustain a recording and performing career at such a high level of artistry for as long as Stephen Cummings

— Shaun Carney, The Age, 1 November 2001

Debonair, romantic and sensitive, Cummings owns a voice that allows vulnerable yearning qualities as much space as an authoritative voice of experience.

— Lauren Zoric, Rolling Stone Australia, issue 544, January 1998

In a year rich in fine albums from singer-songwriters as diverse as Bob Dylan, Ron Sexsmith and Lucinda Williams, this is one of the finest

— Larry Schwartz, The Sunday Age, 28 October 2001

== Bibliography ==
- Cummings, Stephen (1996). Wonderboy. Port Melbourne, VIC: Minerva. ISBN 1-86330-511-4.
- Cummings, Stephen (1999). Stay Away From Lightning Girl. Milsons Point, NSW: Vintage. ISBN 1-86330-590-4.
- Cummings, Stephen (2009). Will it Be Funny Tomorrow, Billy? : misadventures in music. Prahran, VIC: Hardie Grant Books. ISBN 978-1-74066-643-5.

== Discography ==
=== Studio albums ===
List of studio albums, with selected chart positions
| Title | Album details | Peak chart positions |
| Title | Album details | AUS |
|---|---|---|
| Senso | Released: August 1984; Label: Regular Records (RRLP 1208) | 46 |
| This Wonderful Life | Released: August 1986; Label: Centre Records (829 725-1) | 69 |
| Lovetown | Released: January 1988; Label: Rampant Releases (RR052) | 61 |
| A New Kind of Blue | Released: March 1989; Label: True Tone Records (791309) | 53 |
| Good Humour | Released: February 1991; Label: True Tone Records (847625) | 40 |
| Unguided Tour | Released: August 1992; Label: Polydor Records (5138522) | 76 |
| Falling Swinger | Released: August 1994; Label: Polydor Records (5233552) | – |
| Escapist | Released: September 1996; Label: Polydor Records (5318402) | – |
| Spiritual Bum | Released: 26 July 1999; Label: Festival Records (D24112) | – |
| Skeleton Key | Released: 3 October 2001; Label: W. Minc Productions (WMINCD021) | – |
| Firecracker | Released: February 2003; Label: W. Minc Productions (WMINCD028) | – |
| Close Ups | Released: 16 August 2004; Label: Liberation Music (BLUE069.2) | – |
| Love-O-Meter | Released: 10 October 2005; Label: Liberation Music (LIBCD7181.5) | – |
| Space Travel | Released: 25 August 2007; Label: Liberation Music (LIBCD92435) | – |
| Happiest Man Alive | Released: 6 September 2008; Label: Head Records (HEAD099) | – |
| Tickety Boo | Released: 2 November 2009; Label: Head Records (HEAD123) | – |
| Good Bones | Released: August 2010; Label: Liberation Music (BLUE180.2) | – |
| Reverse Psychology | Released: 17 February 2012; Label: Head Records (HEAD155) | – |
| Nothing to Be Frightened Of | Released: August 2014; Label: Head Records (HEAD198) | – |
| Prisoner of Love | Released: February 2019; Label: Bloodlines / UMA (BLOOD43) | – |
| 100 Years from Now | Scheduled 5 May 2023; Label: Cheersquad Records & Tapes | TBA |

=== Live albums ===
List of live albums
| Title | Album details |
|---|---|
| Live 2002 | Released: April 2003; Label: W. Minc Productions (Limited Edition) |
| Live in the Big Room (CD/DVD set) | Released: 25 August 2008; Label: Liberation Music (LMCD0003) |

=== Compilation albums ===
List of compilation
| Title | Album details |
|---|---|
| Rollercoaster | Released: 1993; Label: Polydor Records (5211492) |
| Puppet Pauper Pirate Poet Pawn & King | Released: October 1997; Label: Polydor Records (5378832) |
| That's My Cave Man | Released: January 2008; Label: Stephen Cummings |
| A Life is a Life – Anthology | Released: April 2019; Label: Bloodlines / UMA (BLOOD44) |

=== Extended plays ===
List of compilation
| Title | EP details |
|---|---|
| Joy | Released: November 2025 |

=== Singles ===
| Year | Single | Peak chart positions | Album |
| Year | Single | AUS | Album |
|---|---|---|---|
| 1982 | "We All Make Mistakes" | 89 | Senso |
| 1983 | "Stuck on Love" | 76 | Senso |
| 1983 | "Backstabbers" | 40 | Senso |
| 1984 | "Gymnasium" | 27 | Senso |
| 1984 | "Another Kick in the Head" | — | Senso |
| 1985 | "What Am I Going to Do?" | 80 | Non-album single |
| 1986 | "Speak with Frankness" | 83 | This Wonderful Life |
| 1986 | "Love Is Crucial But Money, That's Everything" | — | This Wonderful Life |
| 1987 | "Set Fire to This House" (with Andrew Pendlebury) | — | Lovetown |
| 1988 | "Some Prayers Are Answered" | — | Lovetown |
| 1988 | "My Willingness" | — | Lovetown |
| 1988 | "A Life Is a Life" | — | A New Kind of Blue |
| 1989 | "Your House Is Falling" | 80 | A New Kind of Blue |
| 1989 | "When the Day Is Done" | 161 | A New Kind of Blue |
| 1990 | "Hell (You've Put Me Through)" | 33 | Good Humour |
| 1991 | "Family Affair" | 167 | Good Humour |
| 1991 | "Stand Up (Love Is the Greatest)" | 142 | Good Humour |
| 1992 | "Keep the Ball Rolling" | 125 | Unguided Tour |
| 1992 | "Didn't Anybody Ever Say No to You" | – | Unguided Tour |
| 1993 | "I've Got a Lot of Faith in You" | 171 | Unguided Tour |
| 1993 | "Teacher I Need You" | 102 | The Heartbreak Kid soundtrack |
| 1993 | "Whatever Love Is" | 144 | Rollercoaster |
| 1994 | "September 13/White Noise" | 160 | Falling Swinger |
| 1994 | "The Big Room" | — | Falling Swinger |
| 1995 | "Fell from a Great Height" (with Toni Childs) | 147 | Falling Swinger |
| 1996 | "Sometimes" | 157 | Escapist |
| 1996 | "Taken by Surprise" | 175 | Escapist |
| 1999 | "Don't Talk to Me About Love" | — | Spiritual Bum |
| 1999 | "Wishing Machine" | — | Spiritual Bum |
| 2004 | "When Love Comes Back to Haunt You" (Acoustic version) | — | Close Ups |
| 2023 | "Carry Your Heart" | | 100 Years From Now |
"—" denotes releases that did not chart or were not released in that country.

== Awards ==
=== ARIA Music Awards ===
The ARIA Music Awards is an annual awards ceremony that recognises excellence, innovation, and achievement across all genres of Australian music. Cummings has won one award from six nominations.

| Year | Nominee / work | Award | Result |
|---|---|---|---|
| 1989 | "A Life Is a Life" | Best Male Artist | Nominated |
| 1990 | A New Kind of Blue | Best Male Artist | Nominated |
| 1990 | A New Kind of Blue | Album of the Year | Nominated |
| 1990 | A New Kind of Blue | Best Adult Contemporary Album | Won |
| 1991 | "Hell (You've Put Me Through)" | Best Male Artist | Nominated |
| 1996 | Escapist | Best Adult Contemporary Album | Nominated |

=== Countdown Australian Music Awards ===
Countdown was an Australian pop music TV series on national broadcaster ABC-TV from 1974–1987, it presented music awards from 1979–1987, initially in conjunction with magazine TV Week. The TV Week / Countdown Awards were a combination of popular-voted and peer-voted awards.

| Year | Nominee / work | Award | Result |
|---|---|---|---|
| 1984 | himself ("Gymnasium") | Best Male Performance in a Video | Nominated |
