= Speak with Frankness =

Single by Stephen Cummings

from the album This Wonderful Life
- B-side: "Ten Very Sad Songs"
- Released: June 1986
- Genre: Rock, Pop
- Length: 3:12
- Label: Centre Records
- Songwriters: Stephen Cummings, Andrew Pendlebury
- Producer: Stephen Cummings

Stephen Cummings singles chronology
| "What Am I Going to Do?" (1985) | "Speak with Frankness" (1986) | "Love Is Crucial but Money, That's Everything" (1986) |

"Speak with Frankness" is a song recorded by Australian singer-songwriter Stephen Cummings, released in the year 1986 through the label Centre Records. The song charted at number 83 on the ARIA Charts. It was released as the first single from Cummings' second studio album This Wonderful Life.

== Track listing ==
| No. | Title | Writer(s) | Length |
|---|---|---|---|
| 1. | "Speak With Frankness" | Stephen Cummings, Andrew Pendlebury | 3:12 |
| 2. | "Ten Very Sad Songs" | Stephen Cummings, Anthony Richards | 3:01 |

== Charts ==
| Chart (1985) | Peak position |
|---|---|
| Australia (Kent Music Report) | 83 |
