= Jean Inness =

American film, stage and television actress (1900–1978)

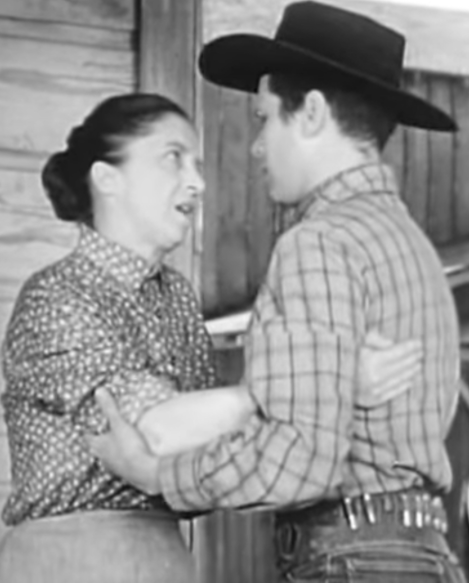
- Inness (left) with Michael Hall in Stories of the Century, 1954
- Born: Jean Spurney Inness; December 18, 1900; Cleveland, Ohio, U.S.
- Died: December 27, 1978 (aged 78); Santa Monica, California, U.S.
- Education: Bryn Mawr College
- Occupations: Film, stage and television actress
- Years active: 1920–1971
- Spouse: Victor Jory (m. 1928)
- Children: 2, including Jon Jory

Jean Spurney Inness (December 18, 1900 – December 27, 1978) was an American film, stage and television actress. Inness played nurse Beatrice Fain in the American medical drama television series Dr. Kildare.

== Life and career ==
Inness was born in Cleveland, Ohio. She attended Bryn Mawr College, and the American Academy of Dramatic Arts. Inness began her career in 1920 touring Indianapolis and Cincinnati with the Stuart Walker Stock Company. She also starred with Stewart Walker in productions of The Cradle Snatchers and An Ideal Husband.

Inness performed for 34 weeks with the Denham Stock Company in Denver, Colorado, and for 26 weeks in Pittsburgh, Pennsylvania. She performed at the Actors Theatre of Louisville in Louisville, Kentucky, with leading roles in stage plays including Cat On a Hot Tin Roof, Long Day's Journey Into Night, Stages and Death of a Salesman. Her son Jon Jory was a stage director at the Actors Theatre of Louisville. In 1928, Inness was cast in the lead role of the stage play The Jest at the Pasadena Playhouse.

Inness played the title role in the 1940 production of Ramona, starring with Onslow Stevens.

Inness began her screen career in 1942, appearing in the film Not a Ladies' Man. She appeared on television programs including Gunsmoke, The Andy Griffith Show, Bonanza, The Twilight Zone, Wagon Train, The Virginian, The Big Valley and Rawhide. Inness played Nurse Beatrice Fain in the medical drama television series Dr. Kildare.

== Death ==
Inness died in December 1978 at her home in Santa Monica, California, at the age of 78.

== Television ==
Year	Title	Role	Notes
1958	Peter Gunn	Loretta Gymps	S1:E5, "The Frog"
1959	Rawhide	Carrie Hode	S1:E19, "Incident of the Dry Drive"
1961	Rawhide	Hattie	S4:E4, "Judgement at Hondo Seco"
1962	Wagon Train	Mrs Lathrop	S5:E21, “The Daniel Clay Story”
1967	Ironside	Dee Stowe	S1:E13, "The Past Is Prologue"
