= Szczepan Sadurski =

Polish satirist, cartoonist, caricaturist and journalist (born 1965)

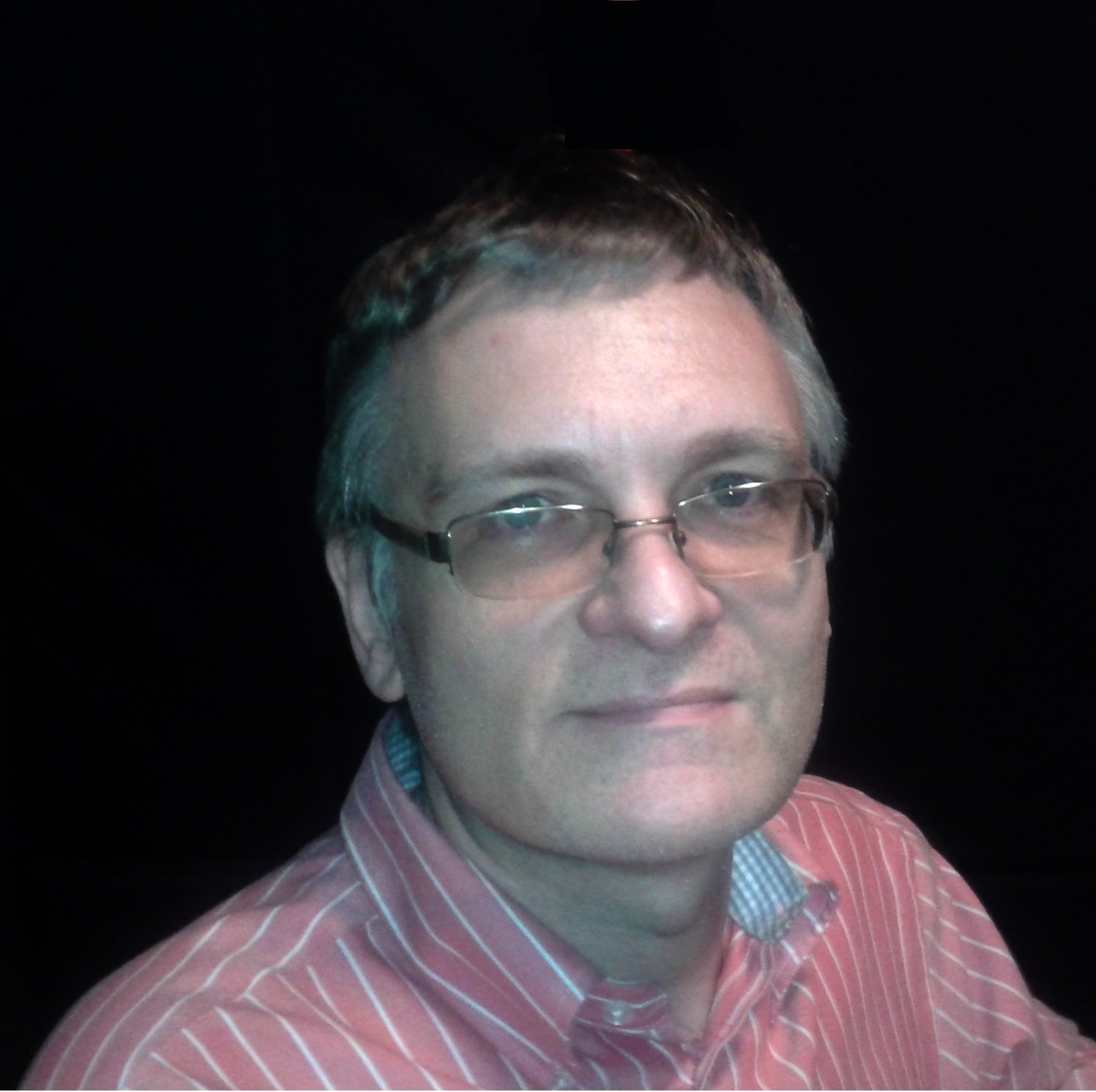
- Photograph of Sadurski
- Born: June 9, 1965 (age 60); Lublin, Poland
- Occupation: Cartoonist
- Known for: Founding the Good Humor Party

Szczepan Piotr Sadurski is a Polish satirist, cartoonist, caricaturist, journalist, and the leader of the Good Humor Party.

== Early life and works ==
He was born on June 9, 1965 in Lublin, and graduated from art secondary school in 1985. He has published more than 5,000 drawings in 200 magazines.

Sadurski is the winner of awards, including the Golden Szpilka ‘86 (prize from the magazine Szpilki for the year's best drawing). He is the founder of Wydawnictwo Humoru i Satyry (Humour and Satire Publishing) Superpress (1991) editor in chief of the magazine Dobry Humor.

He is also the founder and leader of the Good Humor Party–an informal, international organization for people who love laughing (more than 3,000 members in Poland and other countries). In addition, Sadurski is the owner of the Sadurski.com satirical web portal. He has been a juror in many satirical and cabaret competitions in Poland, as well as in Turkey and Sweden. He lives in Poland's capital, Warsaw.
