= Back Stabbers (song) =

1972 single by the O'Jays

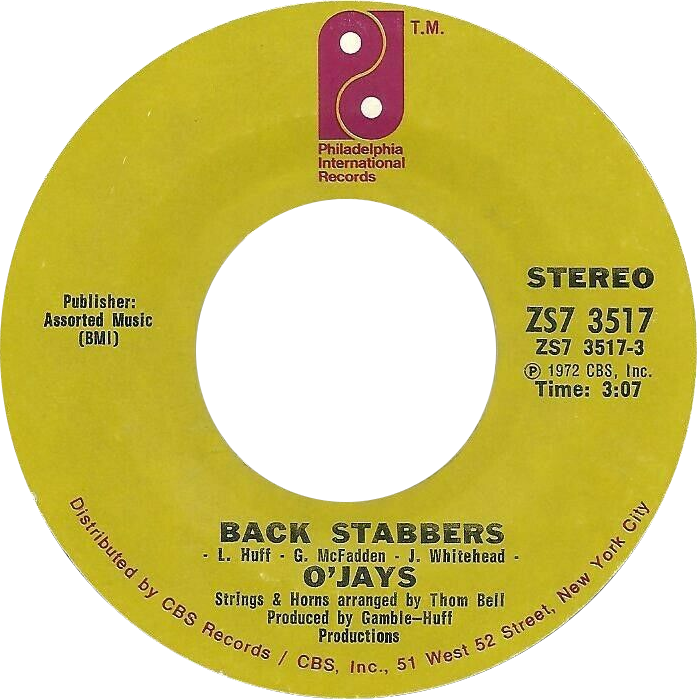
- Side A of US vinyl single

Single by the O'Jays

from the album Back Stabbers
- B-side: "Sunshine"
- Released: 1972
- Studio: Sigma Sound, Philadelphia, Pennsylvania
- Genre: Soul
- Length: 3:06
- Label: Philadelphia International
- Songwriters: Leon Huff; Gene McFadden; John Whitehead
- Producers: Kenny Gamble; Leon Huff

The O'Jays singles chronology
"Looky Looky (Look at Me Girl)" (1970)	"Back Stabbers" (1972)	"992 Arguments" (1972)

Music video
- "Back Stabbers" on YouTube

"Back Stabbers" is a 1972 song by the O'Jays. Released from the hit album of the same name, it spent one week at number 1 on the Hot Soul Singles chart. It was also successful on the pop chart, peaking at number 3 on the Billboard Hot 100 in October 1972. The narrator in "Back Stabbers" warns men about their male "friends" who smile to their faces, but are secretly planning to steal their wives or girlfriends. It was inspired by an earlier hit with a similar theme, the Undisputed Truth's "Smiling Faces Sometimes", the chorus of which is quoted at the end of this song. It was part of the soundtrack for the 1977 movie Looking for Mr. Goodbar. In 2002, the song was sampled by R&B artist Angie Stone for her single "Wish I Didn't Miss You".

This was the O'Jays first release with Philadelphia International.

== Charts ==
=== Weekly charts ===
Chart (1972)	Peak position
Australia Kent Music Report	92
Canada RPM	39
UK Singles (Official Charts)	14
US Billboard Hot 100	3
US Billboard R&B Singles	1
US Cash Box Top 100	1

=== Year-end charts ===
Chart (1972)	Rank
US Billboard Hot 100	35
US Cash Box Top 100	21

== Stephen Cummings version ==
"Backstabbers"
- 7-inch single Australian cover

Single by Stephen Cummings

from the album Senso
- B-side: "Hardly Working"
- Released: December 1983
- Genre: Rock, Pop
- Length: 3:20; 5:29 (Extended Dance mix)
- Label: Regular Records, Warner Music Group
- Songwriters: Gene McFadden, John Whitehead, Leon Huff
- Producer: Martin Armiger

Stephen Cummings singles chronology
"Stuck on Love" (1982)	"Backstabbers" (1983)	"Gymnasium" (1984)

Backstabbers (Extended Dance Mix)
- 12 Inch Australian Single Cover

In 1983 Australian singer-songwriter Stephen Cummings released Backstabbers in December 1983 through the Regular Records label as the third single from the album Senso. Cummings version peaked at number 40 on the Kent Music Report.

=== Track listing ===
7"
No.	Title	Writer(s)	Length
1.	"Backstabbers"	Gene McFadden, John Whitehead, Leon Huff	3:20
2.	"Hardly Working"	Stephen Cummings, Ian Stephen	3:32

12"
No.	Title	Writer(s)	Length
1.	"Backstabbers" (Extended Dance Mix)	Gene McFadden, John Whitehead, Leon Huff	5:29
2.	"Backstabbers"	Gene McFadden, John Whitehead, Leon Huff	3:14
3.	"Hardly Working"	Stephen Cummings, Ian Stephen	3:32

=== Personnel ===
- Greg Flood – brass arrangements
- Joe Creighton – bass, additional vocals
- Mark Ferry – bass
- Vince Jones – cornet (solo)
- Martin Armiger – drum programming (Drumulator), guitar, keyboards
- Peter Luscombe – drums
- Andrew Pendlebury – guitar
- Robert Goodge – guitar
- Duncan Veal – keyboards
- Jantra de Vilda – keyboards
- Stephen Bigger – keyboards
- Ricky Fataar – percussion
- Venetta Fields – additional vocals
- Nick Smith – additional vocals
- Linda Nutter – additional vocals
- Nick Smith – additional vocals
- Stephanie Sproul – additional vocals

=== Charts ===
Chart (1983)	Peak position
Australia (Kent Music Report)	40
