= Jon Jory =

American theatre director

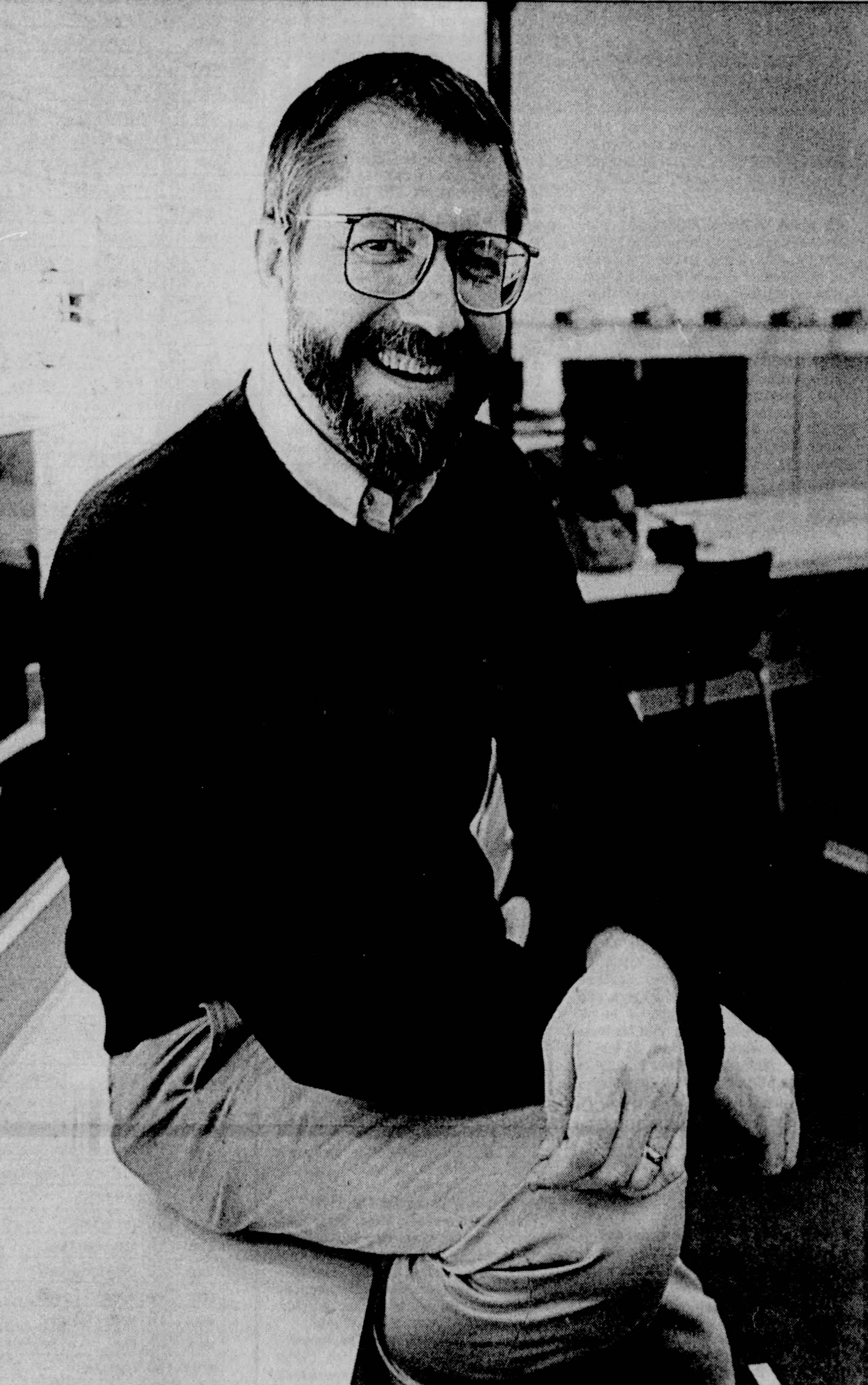
Jory in 1987

Jon Victor Jory (born June 1, 1938, Pasadena, California) is a theatrical director instrumental in the development of Actors Theatre of Louisville; he is also widely rumored to be the writer behind the pseudonym Jane Martin.

== Early life ==
Jory is a child of Hollywood character actors, namely his father Victor Jory, who played Jonas Wilkerson, the scheming overseer in the 1939 film Gone with the Wind, and his mother Jean Inness, who played nurse Beatrice Fain in the American medical drama television series Dr. Kildare. Jory received his Actor's Equity card as a young child.

== Career ==
Jory was at the forefront of the regional theater movement of the 1960s, which began with the opening of the Guthrie Theater in 1963, showing that not all theater talent was centralized in New York City and Los Angeles. Jory served as artistic director of the Long Wharf Theatre from 1965 to 1966; his contract was terminated once the fledgling theater hit rough financial waters.

In 1969, Jory took over the helm of Actors Theatre of Louisville, a small regional theater just five years old. Under his leadership, it became one of the top theaters in the country. Jory's major accomplishment was the foundation and cultivation of the annual Humana Festival of New American Plays in Louisville, beginning in 1976. It has since produced a number of outstanding plays including The Gin Game (1978), Crimes of the Heart (1981), Cementville (1991) and Dinner with Friends (1998), not to mention almost everything Jane Martin has ever written.

In 2017, Jory began teaching at the UCLA Department of Theater as a Visiting Professor.

== Retirement and honors ==
Jory retired from Actors Theatre in 2000. That fall, he joined the faculty at the University of Washington School of Drama as Professor of Acting and Directing. Also, in 2000, Jory was inducted into the American Theatre Hall of Fame. He is the President's Chair of the Performing Arts Department at Santa Fe University of Art and Design.

He holds honorary doctorates from the University of Utah, the University of Louisville, and Bellarmine University.

Asked if Jane Martin's identity will be revealed after her death, Jory has stated with a laugh, "That's a press conference no one will come to. By the time I die, no one will care anyway."

== Publications ==
- Actor's Choice: Monologues for Men Playscripts, Inc.
- Actor's Choice: Scenes for Teens Playscripts, Inc.
- Anne of Green Gables Playscripts, Inc.
- The Bear Brooklyn Publishers
- Captain Hook and the Warrior Amazons Heuer Publishing
- Captain Hook's Very Bad Christmas Heuer Publishing
- The Circus of the Seven Deadly Sins Brooklyn Publishers
- Darcy and Elizabeth Playscripts, Inc.
- Detective Father Brown Heuer Publishing
- The Drama School From Hell Playscripts, Inc.
- Emma Playscripts, Inc.
- The Explosive Fairy Tale Princess Diaries Brooklyn Publishers
- Friday Night Live! Brooklyn Publishers
- The Gift of the Magi Brooklyn Publishers
- The Gift of the Magi Playscripts, Inc.
- Goddess Gap Year Brooklyn Publishers
- The Great Cases of Sherlock Holmes Heuer Publishing
- The Haunted House Farce Heuer Publishing
- Mean Girls in Fairyland Brooklyn Publishers
- Orpheus and What's-Her-Name Brooklyn Publishers
- Passing Periods at Pomegranate Prep Pioneer Drama Service, 2018
- Pride and Prejudice Playscripts, Inc.
- The Prom Game Playscripts, Inc.
- Salvador Dali at the Beach Playscripts, Inc.
- The Secret Lives of Superheroes, Vol. 1 Heuer Publishing
- The Secret Lives of Superheroes, Vol. 2 Heuer Publishing
- Sense and Sensibility Playscripts, Inc.
- Sherlock Holmes' Hat Heuer Publishing
- Sherlock in Love Pioneer Drama Service, 2019
- Sixty Second Singles Playscripts, Inc.
- The Whatsit Pioneer Drama Service, 2017
- Wilbur Peppy's Burger Quest Heuer Publishing
- 20/20 : twenty one-act plays from twenty years of the Humana Festival / edited by Michele Volansky and Michael Bigelow Dixon; foreword by Jon Jory. Smith and Kraus, Lyme, NH ISBN 978-1-880399-98-9
- Tips. ideas for actors Smith & Kraus Pub Inc, 2000, ISBN 978-1-57525-202-5
- Tips. ideas for directors Smith & Kraus Pub Inc, 2002, ISBN 978-1-57525-241-4
- Tips II. more ideas for actors Smith & Kraus Pub Inc, 2004, ISBN 978-1-57525-323-7
- Pride and Prejudice: A Romantic Comedy Playscripts Inc, 2006
- University: a full evening of theatre in ten parts Dramatic Publishing, 1983
- Love, Death and the Prom Dramatic Publishing, 1991, ISBN 978-0-87129-120-2
