= We All Make Mistakes =

- 7-inch single Australian cover

Single by Stephen Cummings

from the album Senso
- B-side: "Accordion To Mao (Inspired By Ian Robinson's Print)"
- Released: December 1982
- Genre: Rock, Pop
- Length: 2:24 (Single version); 3:51 (Album version) and (Extended mix)
- Label: Regular Records, Warner Music Group
- Songwriter(s): Stephen Cummings, Ian Stephen
- Producer(s): Martin Armiger

Stephen Cummings singles chronology
"We All Make Mistakes" (1982)	"Stuck on Love" (1983)

We All Make Mistakes/Stuck On Love 12 Inch
- 12 Inch Australian Single Cover

"We All Make Mistakes" is the debut single by Australian singer-songwriter Stephen Cummings, released in December 1982 through Regular Records. The song was written by Cummings and Ian Stephen. It was released as the first single from Cummings' debut studio album Senso. The song peaked at number 89 on the Kent Music Report.

== Track listing ==
7"
No.	Title	Writer(s)	Length
1.	"We All Make Mistakes"	Stephen Cummings, Ian Stephen	3:01
2.	"Accordion To Mao (Inspired By Ian Robinson's Print)"	Stephen Cummings, Ian Stephen	3:01

12"
No.	Title	Writer(s)	Length
1.	"We All Make Mistakes" (Extended Mix)	Stephen Cummings, Ian Stephen	3:51
2.	"Stuck On Love" (Extended Mix)	Stephen Cummings, Ian Stephen	4:13

== Personnel ==
- Arranged by (brass arrangements) – Greg Flood
- Joe Creighton - Bass, Additional vocals
- Mark Ferry - Bass
- Vince Jones - Cornet (solo)
- Martin Armiger - Drum programming (Drumulator), Guitar, Keyboards
- Peter Luscombe - Drums
- Andrew Pendlebury - Guitar
- Robert Goodge - Guitar
- Duncan Veal - Keyboards
- Jantra de Vilda - Keyboards
- Stephen Bigger - Keyboards
- Ricky Fataar - Percussion
- Venetta Fields - Additional vocals
- Nick Smith - Additional vocals
- Linda Nutter - Additional vocals
- Nick Smith - Additional vocals
- Stephanie Sproul - Additional vocals

== Charts ==
Chart (1982)	Peak position
Australia (Kent Music Report)	89
