= Good Humor Party =

International satirical organization

- Partia Dobrego Humoru
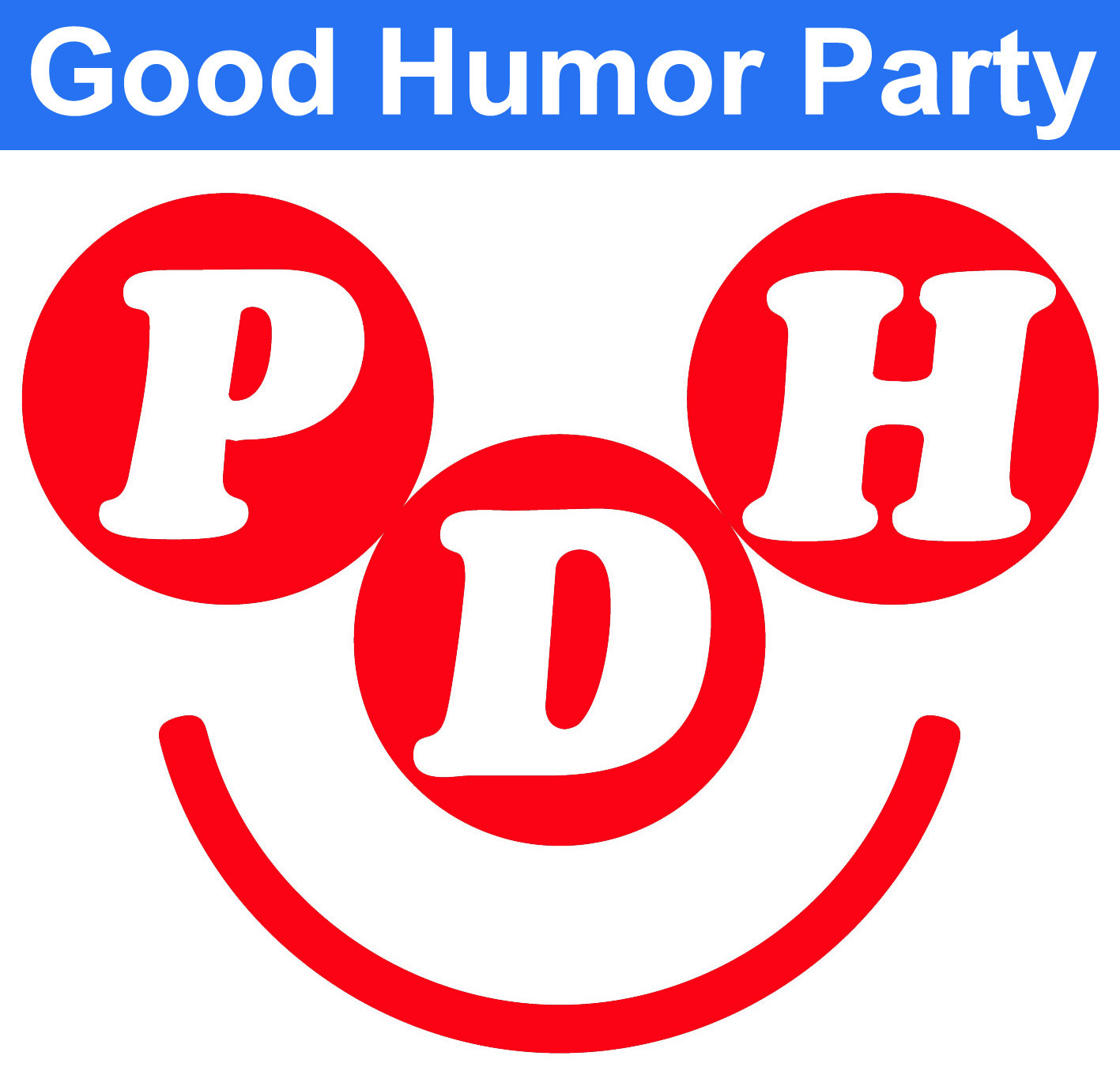
- Formation: 28 June 2001; 25 years ago
- Founder: Szczepan Sadurski
- Founded at: Gdańsk, Poland
- Type: Satirical, international
- Purpose: To promote optimism and humor
- Region served: Global
- Members: +5,000
- Website: www.rysunki.pl

The Good Humor Party (Polish: Partia Dobrego Humoru) is an international satirical and apolitical organization founded in Poland on 28 June 2001 by Polish cartoonist and journalist Szczepan Sadurski.

== Goals and activities ==
The main objective of the organization is to improve the mood of people worldwide. Membership is symbolic, with a "fee" consisting of "three broad smiles a day." Currently, the party has over 5,000 members in dozens of countries, including many professional artists and satirists.

== Happy Skyscraper (Wesoły Wieżowiec) ==
The symbol of the party is the Happy Skyscraper (Polish: Wesoły Wieżowiec). This global art project was launched on 10 October 2012 in Manhattan, New York City. It involves a cardboard model of a skyscraper with the party's logo being photographed at various landmarks. To date, the Happy Skyscraper has been photographed in over 700 cities across all continents.

== Gallery ==
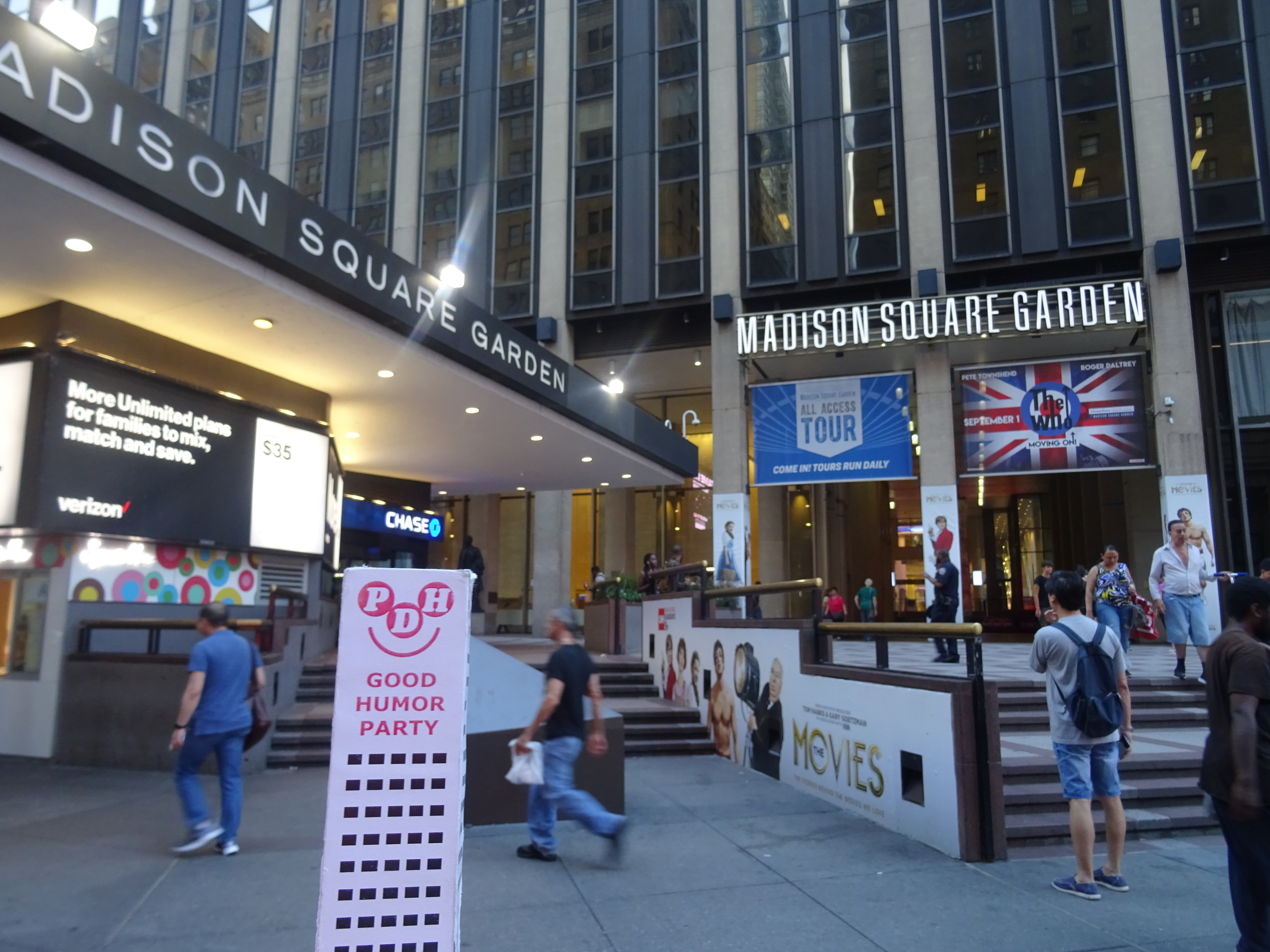
Madison Square Garden, New York City.

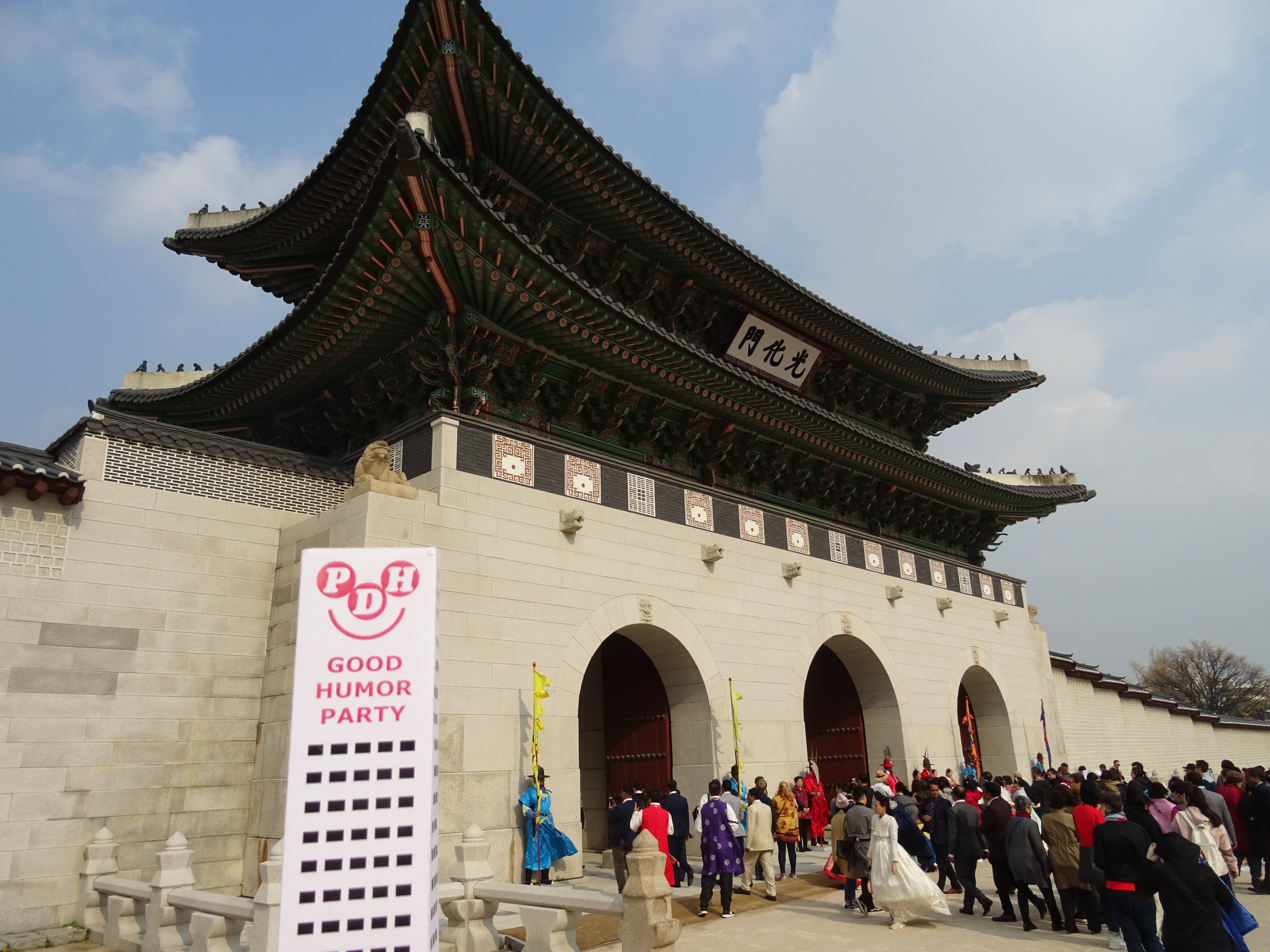
Seoul, South Korea.

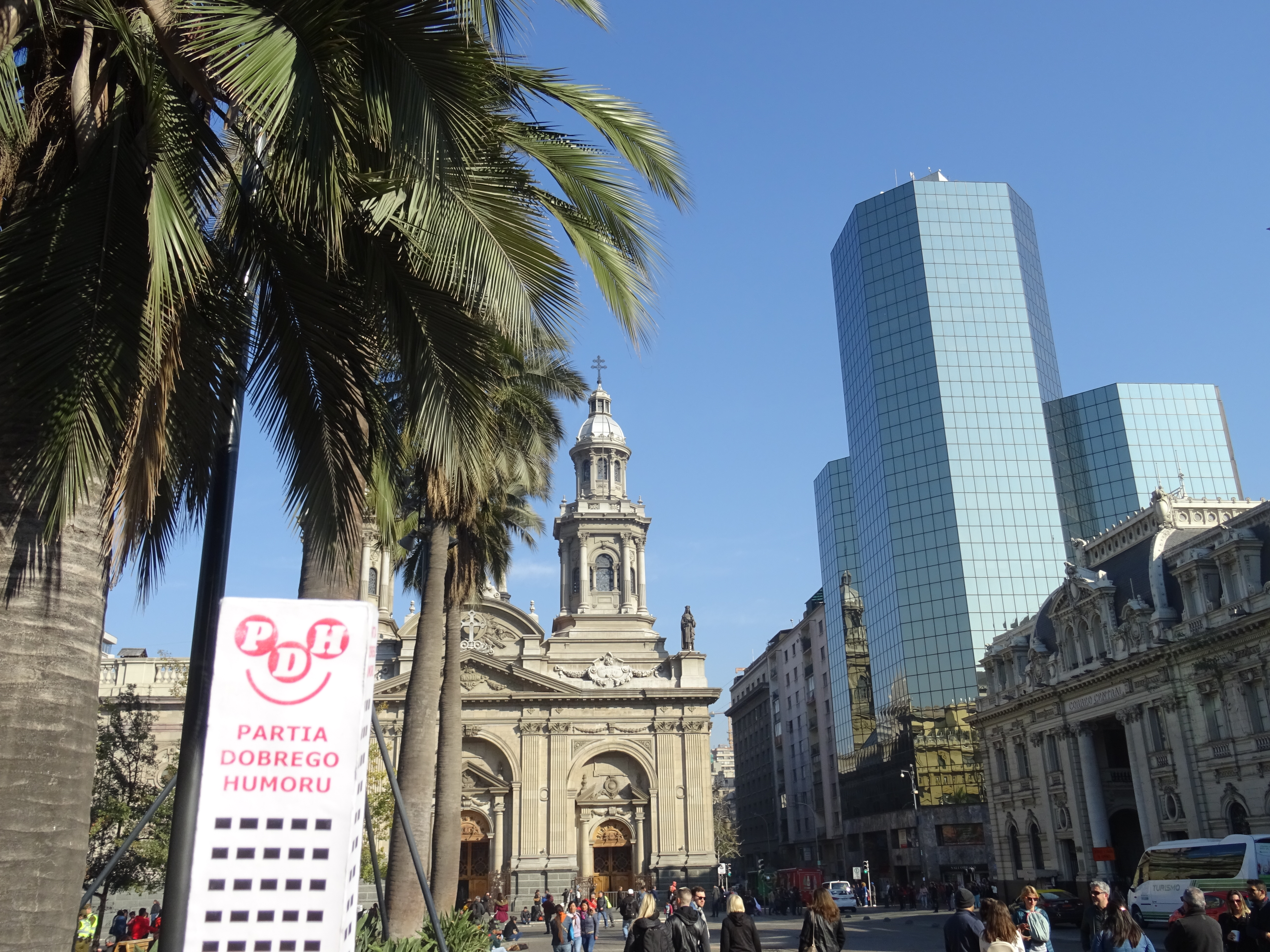
Santiago, Chile.

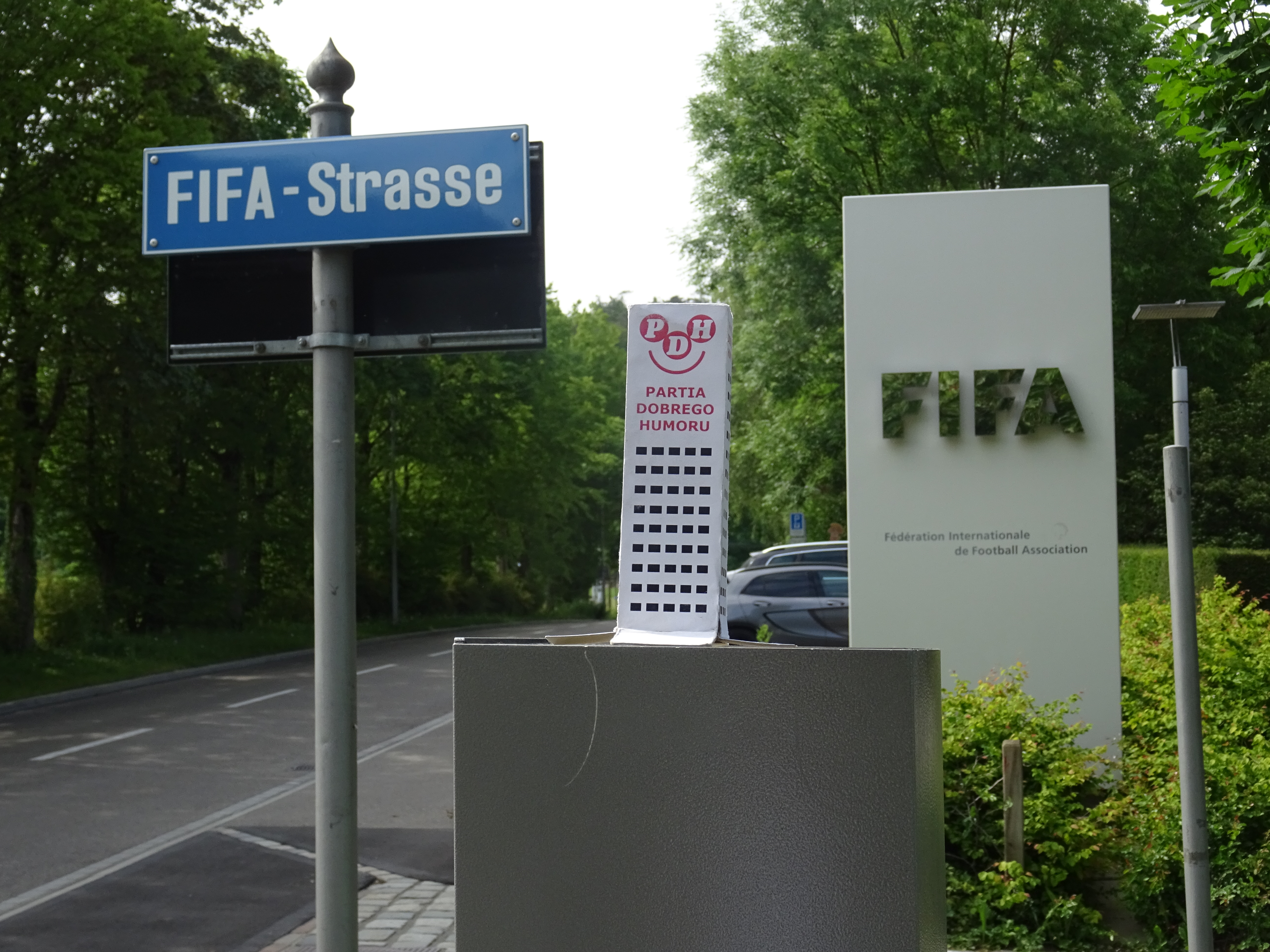
FIFA Headquarters, Zurich, Switzerland.

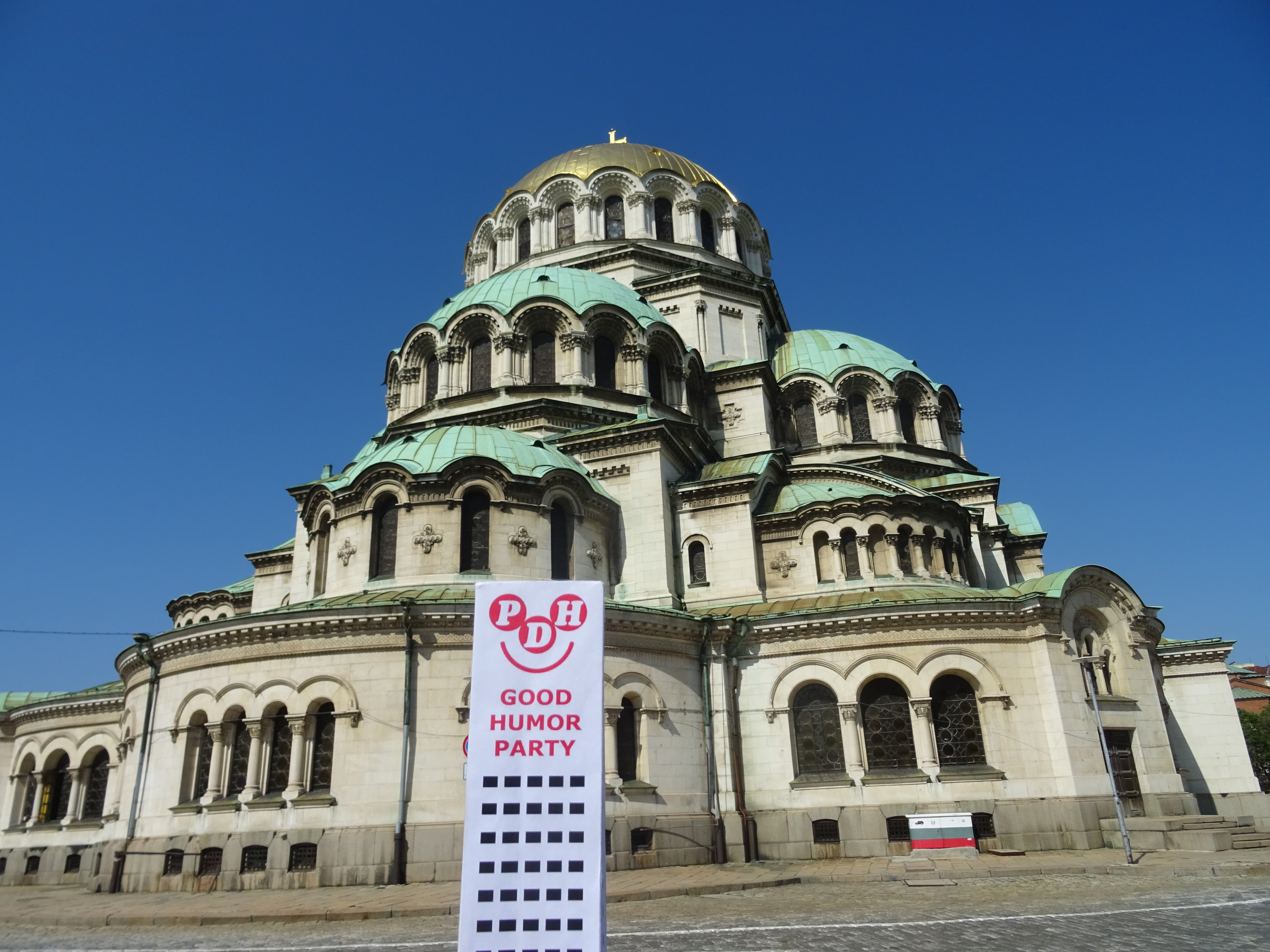
Sofia, Bulgaria.

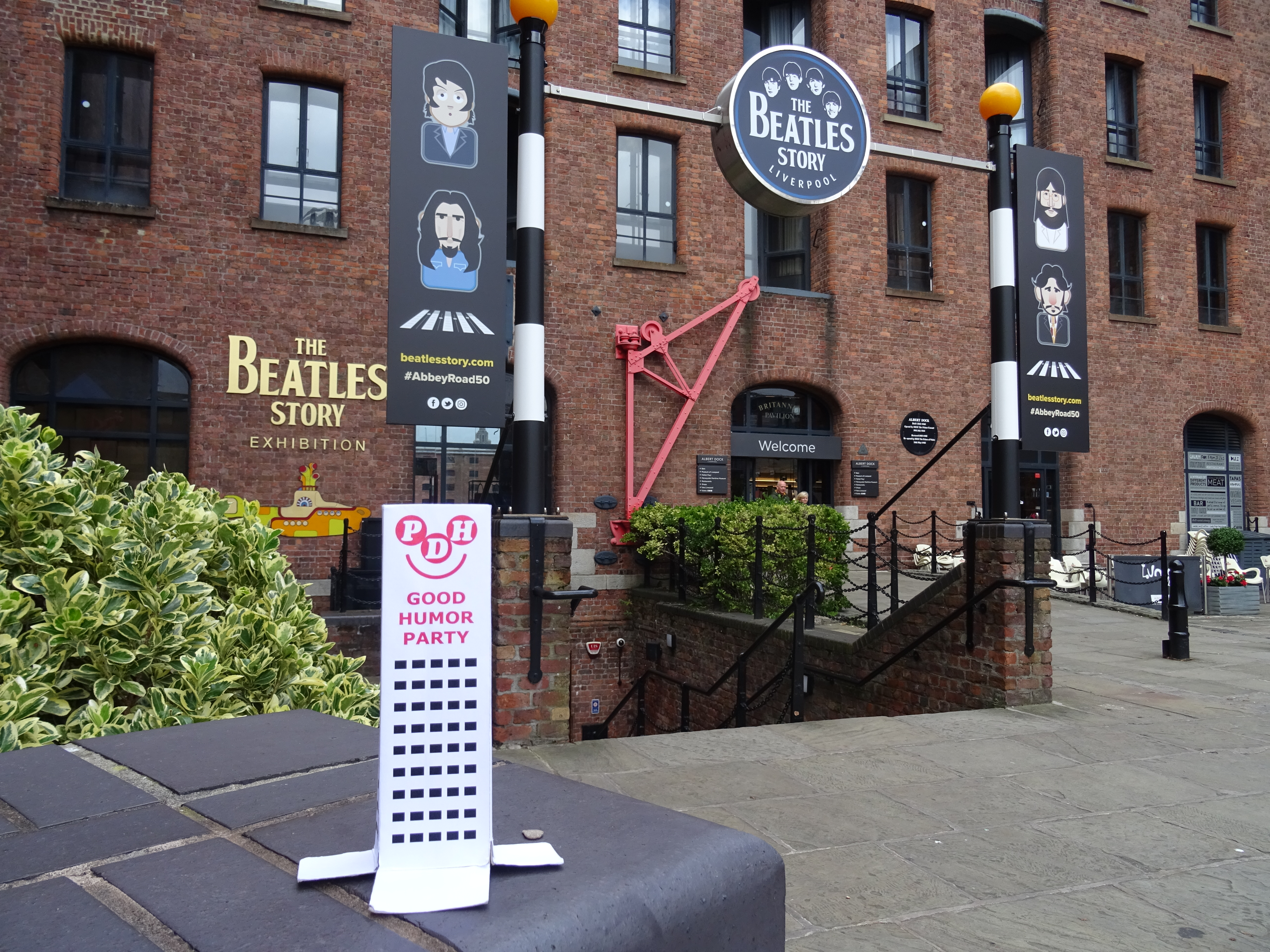
The Beatles Statue, Liverpool, England.

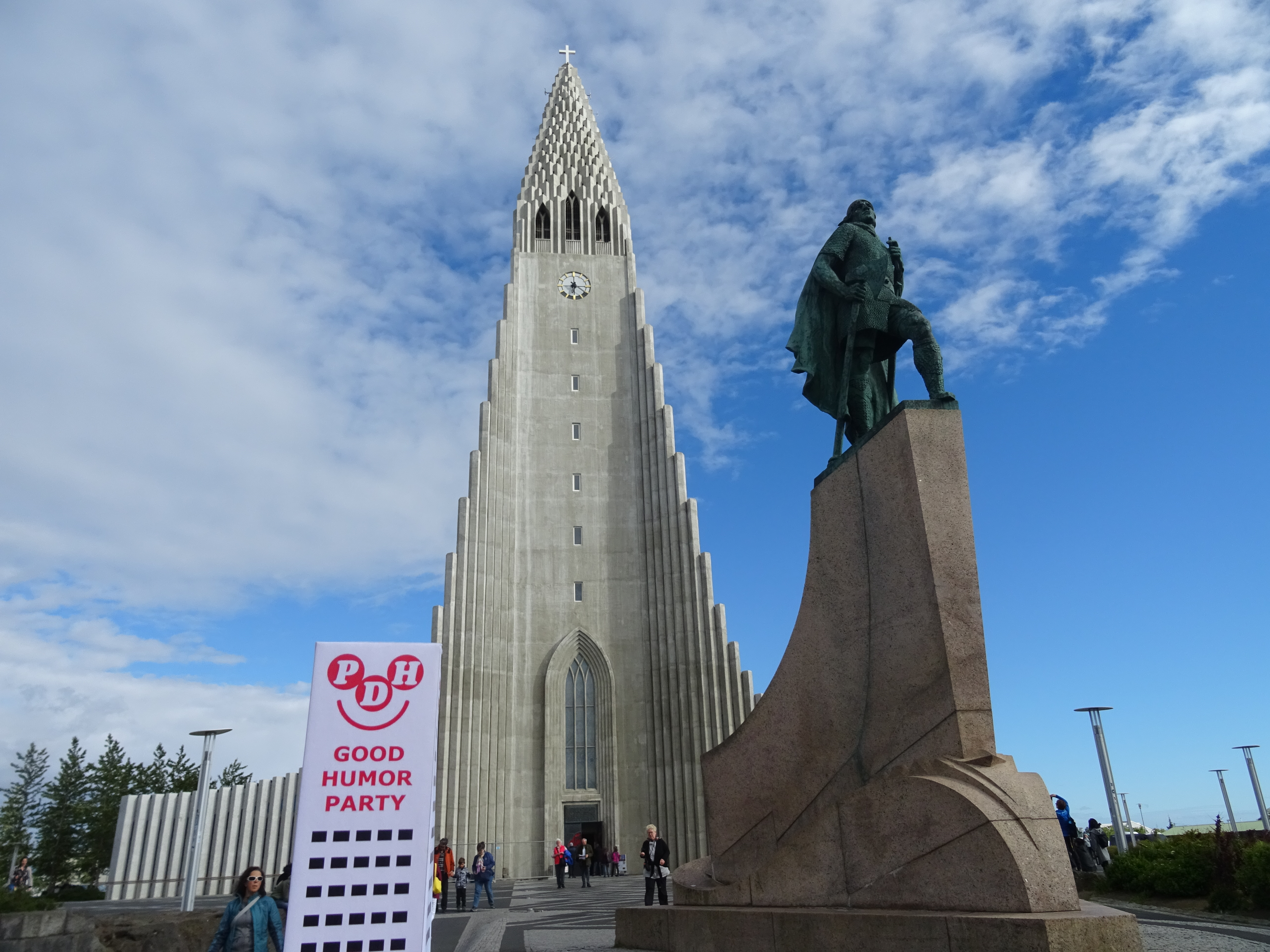
Reykjavik, Iceland.

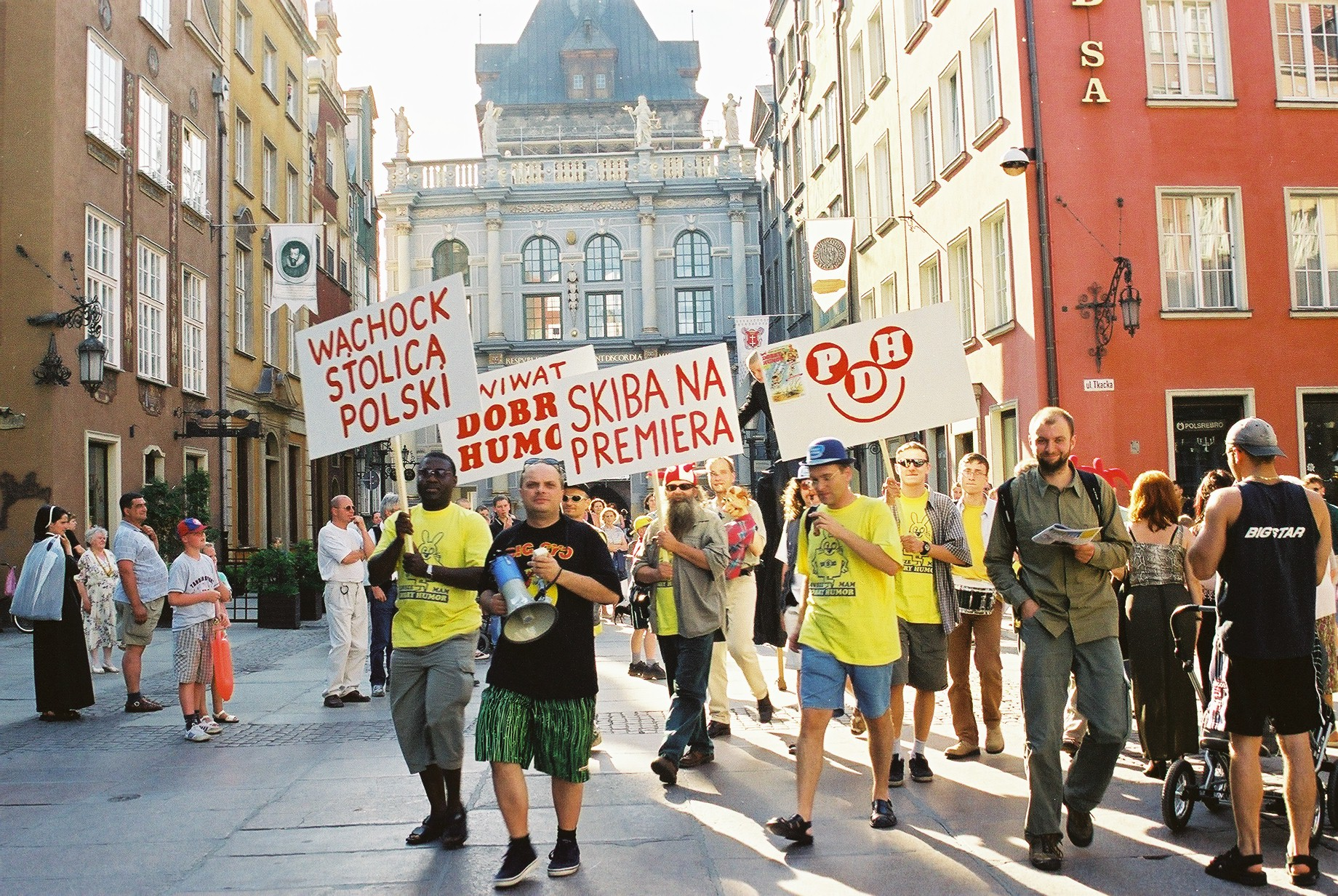
Foundation happening in Gdańsk, Poland (2001).
