= Cementville =

Play written by Jane Martin

Cementville is a 1991 dark comedy play written by Jane Martin, a Pulitzer-nominated author. It premiered at the Humana Festival of New American Plays on 1991. The work has also been republished in several collections of modern American plays.

Set in a dingy arena locker room in a Tennessee rust town, the story follows a collection of run-down female professional wrestlers and their blow-hard manager as they try to put on a card of matches and everything goes wrong.

== Plot ==
In a dismal locker room, Dwayne, an autograph hound, is trolling around when Nola (a local fan and arena gopher girl) and Tiger (a road-weary ex-con) enter. He dives into the broom closet. Another wrestler, Dani comes in and rants about their typical treatment and money issues. Netty and Angelessa come in next. Dani runs down the line up for tonight's card, revealing that all of them will actually be playing several parts.

Tiger sends Nola on a beer run for them. Big Man enters to run down the lineup. His brother Eddie had to be taken to the hospital the night before, and his best guess is a hooker assaulted him. Dani complains about the lack of pay, and Big Man slaps her. He then tells them since Eddie's out, the cruiserweight title match is off. Angelessa offers to do a mixed match. But despite her being a former Olympian, Big Man shoots it down. He tells them that he's called in The Knockout Sisters, a tag team of two sisters, who happen to live not too far away. The women aren't very happy, knowing that Big Man will be spending part of their pay for the extra wrestlers.

As the ladies dress, they ponder over Eddie's fate. Suddenly, there's a thump from the broom closet. Angelessa opens the door and finds Dwayne hiding. He pleads for autographs but after they, including Nola, have signed his book, he starts preaching at them for being sinful whores. Angelessa grabs him and throws him out, but not before he can grab Tiger by her sore ribs, leaving her in even more pain.

Before bell time, Big Man introduces Mother Crocker and her girls, The Knockout Sisters (Dolly and Dottie). They know little about actual wrestling, as their mother's guidance has gotten them this far.

Dani and Tiger do the first match (Bloody Mary vs. Tarzana, Queen of the Jungle). It doesn't go very well and Tiger is in real pain. Angelessa and Netty are up next (as Black Lightning vs. Pajama Mama). When some guy in the crowd throws something at Angelessa, she leaves the ring and goes after him.

Angelessa gets dressed as “Olympia” for her next match with Tiger. Mother steps in saying that she can't go out there and play the face (good girl) since she's black and the crowd is full of rednecks. Mother complains to Big Man. During the argument, Dolly pulls out a pistol to break it up.

Willie "The Kid" Cayman, a former boxer pops in. He's touring the old arenas he fought in. He talks the girls up about the old days and how the fight game has changed.

Mother convinces Dani to do a lingerie match for one hundred dollars. Nola volunteers to wrestle her. They return triumphant. The match not only went well, but they got tips from the crowd after the fight. The big tag-team match is finally ready to go. Dani and Nola (as Ninjas) will job a match (take a dive) for The Knockout Sisters.

Angelessa snaps before the tag match starts. She locks Nola in the broom closet, and puts on Nola's Ninja costume. Before she can leave, Eddie arrives. He has come back for Angelessa, since it was she who injured him the night before. Meanwhile, the crowd boils into a riot. Dottie flees to the locker room, bleeding. Netty and Tiger tend to her. She says her sister was lost, swept up into the crowd. Angelessa re-enters the locker room, with Mother in a headlock. Despite Mother's bribe offers for her to stop, Angelessa hits her and trashes the room.

Big Man storms in from the fray, furious at Angelessa for what she's done. Mother and Dottie make a run for it. Anglessa and Big Man brawl, but he eventually beats her down. Willie grabs Dolly's pistol and shoots Big Man in the leg to stop him. Dani, Nola, Netty and Anglessa run out the back to Willie's car. The raging crowd is now at the door. Willie calmly moves a locker set aside to reveal an old service tunnel leading out. Big Man and Eddie start to come to, but the mob outside is starting to bash down the old wooden door when the lights go out.

== Characters ==
(In order of appearance in the play)

- Dwayne Pardee – Local character and autograph hound. Dwayne stalks any celebrities or near-celebrities that happen to come to Cementville. He keeps a large signature book that he says he plans to put into a time capsule for future generations. Dwayne, however, has some apparent mental issues combined from religious fervor and his idolizing of popular figures. That zeal can turn ugly.
- Tiger – A wrestling ring veteran and ex-con. Tiger (no other name known) has managed to survive in the wrestling business mostly due to her physical stature and ability to play a good heel (bad girl). Tiger, however, has been working so long that she almost constantly needs to numb her aching body with alcoholic beverages or other drugs. Tiger has little to care about, since she feels she has no other future, but she does take care of her little dog (no name given) and will back up her friends when push comes to shove – if only her ribs weren't so sore.
- Nola – Local fangirl and wrestling wanna'be. Nola barely got through high school and so far only managed to work part-time or temp jobs at a local gas station and local factories, but she's always dreamed of being a big-time wrestling star. She wrestles with her bigger cousin, Jadine, for practice and can beat her in 'straight' wrestling. Nola has taught herself a lot of pro style moves but the psychology and drama of the ring seem to have escaped her and she has NO knowledge has the wrestling business really works.
- Dani Malowski – The wrestling troupe's diva, Dani is actually a trained and talented wrestler. But, she's overworked and underpaid since signing with Big Man's outfit. If it wasn't for her mouth and attitude, she might have actually made the big-time. Dani has no issue confronting her bosses, but at the same time she lets herself be abused and seeks comfort in the strange men she meets on the road. Dani often has to portray several characters in the same show, working more than one match to make up for the low talent pool in the company.
- Angelessa or Lessa – A former Olympian (shot putter) and college athlete, Lessa could never parlay her talents into a paying job. Probably hoping like W.W.E. and T.N.A. superstar Kurt Angle, she thought she could transition into wrestling. The problem for her is that she has the body and ability, but lacks the mental attitude for the wrestling game. She is a very proud young woman and finds it difficult to accept that she's merely entertainment now and must occasionally lose, not an actual competitor. She also has to deal with being the only African-American in the troupe and the attitude of rural fans to her as bad girl Black Lightning.
- Netty – The middle-age Alabama matron of the mats has done about every low-paying job out there. But, after trying her hand at working the ring, she's found she actually enjoys the job. Netty is a rose-colored glasses optimist, mostly due to the fact that she feels she has nothing else but the wrestling business now. She deals with the pain, the low pay and the low environments, since it gives her the chance to travel and be among the other women. Netty is bi-sexual, though she seems to prefer younger girls and has no qualms about it. Her demeanor, however, is that of a very genteel Southern gal who is just as pleased as punch to do anything asked of her.
- Big Man Vag – Raised in the fight world, Big Man started out as gopher and coffee boy in Joe Louis' Boxing Gym. He knows all about the fight game, having been involved in both boxing and wrestling but never could excel at either. His brother Eddie Vag did manage to elevate himself in the wrestling world and Big rode his coattails. As Eddie's career waned, Big Man formed a wrestling troupe and tour around him, being the company's booker (sets the fights and dates) and promoter. Big Mag adopted the ring persona of Irish Bob to be the foil to Eddie Stosha 'The Wild Man' Oronofsky. Outside the ring, Big is only somewhat capable of running his company and cannot handle real stress. He is also a recovering alcoholic.
- Mother Crocker – Formerly an owner of a small chain of car garages, Mother saw the explosion of pro wrestling on Pay Per View as a possible money-maker for her two young daughters (Dolly and Dottie) by turning them into the Knockout Sisters tag team. Giving the girls only some basic pro wrestling training, Mother pushed them onto every federation on their rise to stardom; which the girls did mostly on their backs in hotel rooms. She is a very formidable middle-aged woman, who smokes small cigars as she bulldozes her girls way to the top. Sadly, their run-in with the law was a setback to her long-term goal of getting the Knockouts into movies.
- Dolly Crocker – One half the Knockout Sisters, the scary half. The petite blonde may be a borderline sociopath, and has no compunction about threatening violence on those that get in her way. Like her sister, she has only passing wrestling skills in the ring; letting her looks and sexual favors move her career onwards.
- Dottie Crocker – Dottie looks more like a fitness model, being just under six feet tall with a lithe figure. She imagines herself as some kind of deep spiritual person, but she's as shallow as her kinfolk. She has no issue using sex to get what she wants, since she doesn't have any other real talent or skill.
- Bobbie Jack 'One-Eye' Deanavue – A warehouse worker from Lecher County, Kentucky. Bobbie Jack is a simple man. He works hard and he wants to play hard, but he is very critical if he's paying two-bits to see a show. He wants what he pays for and he has no issue using his favorite knife to get it.
- Ms. Harmon – Local girl and usherette at the Cementville Sportsdrome. Just out of her teens, Ms. Harmon had a two-week personnel training course and is more used to working regular sporting events and truck shows. She's not quite ready for the chaos that the Vixens of Violence Tour is bringing into her arena.
- Willie 'Kid' Cayman – Former middleweight boxer, long retired. Kid did the smart thing when he was still in the fight game, he saved his money and bought property in Florida. In his later years, he got a car and took to the road. He now travels to all the arenas he ever fought in and recalls the glory days of his youth. Kid is very spry older black man, managing to keep his very acute mental faculties, even after years of boxing. He comes across as a sweet old guy with a sharp memory, but he can still deal out the pain if the situation calls.
- Eddie Vag – Former W.W.W.F. wrestling star and known dirtbag. Eddie was once a top draw on the East Coast wrestling circuit, but his glory days are long past – now they are filled with drugs and sex with groupies or local hookers. He has a horrible disposition and is very abusive to the women working in the locker room as an old-timer who worked around women wrestlers who doubled as escorts. He is prone to real violence due to his addictions.

== Stage ==
The original production opened at the Humana Festival of New American Plays in 1991 at Actor's Theatre of Louisville, directed by Jon Jory. Since then, it has been performed in repertory theaters across the country.

== Film ==
In 2003, Screenwriter J.C. Young optioned Cementville for an independent feature film. At that time, the project had attached director and wrestling consultant Dan Madigan, the screenwriter for See No Evil and a former WWE writer. Jessie Kresa, Gina Torres and Louis Gossett Jr as well as Joanie Laurer aka WWE star Chyna had been approached to play major roles. Stunt Coordinator, Stuntwoman and former pro wrestler Deven MacNair was attached to play a role as well as choreograph the wrestling scenes.

The film was originally picked up and greenlit by DIMI Entertainment, however, the company ceased business before the film could go into production.
