= Ian Stephen =

Australian/American musician

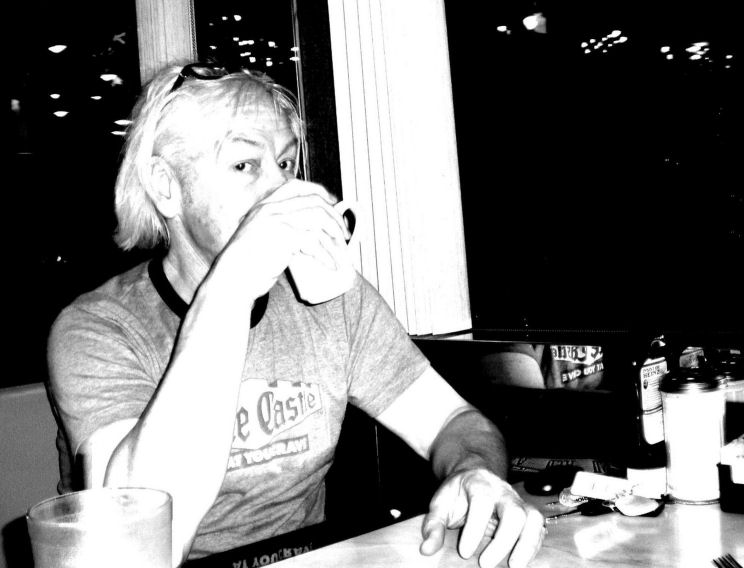

Background information
- Born: Armadale, Victoria, Australia
- Occupations: Singer, musician
- Instrument: Piano Guitar
- Labels: Au Go Go, Cleopatra, Endtime
- Website: www.ianstephen.com

Ian Stephen is an Australian-American musician.

In 1984, with bass player Mark Ferrie, guitarists Terry Doolan and Andrew Pendlebury, and drummer Des Hefner, Ian formed the Slaughtermen in Melbourne, a mid eighties post-punk alternative Southern gospel group (albeit 12,000 miles away from their original source of inspiration, America's Deep South Bible Belt). Around this time Ian began private voice lessons with vocal coach Eve Godley and later at the Melba Conservatorium. Much earlier Ian had studied piano at the Andrios School of Music in Footscray, which was also attended by Mark Ferrie, although not at the same time. Prior to the Slaughtermen, Ian's checkered career included The Armchairs, a satirical four piece outfit co-founded with Johnny Topper which had its debut in 1979 at the infamous Crystal Ballroom in St Kilda. Other members included guitarist Pierre Jaquinot, Andrew Snow, drums, and Fred Cass, bass. Later incarnations featured Rod Haywood, guitar, and Sue Parncutt, bass. The Armchairs released a 7-inch Ep, Ski Lo Lo, and a 12-inch album, Party Time, on Missing Link Records with the entire B side taken up by a 20-minute version of "La Bamba". The Armchairs, later with the help of Stephen Cummings, who in the early 1980s Ian had struck up a songwriting partnership with, morphed into the mildly successful, yet short lived 11 piece group, Go Wild in French, which featured songs of Elvis Presley, as well as original compositions.

Fed up with the claustrophobic Melbourne scene, Ian moved to Sydney in 1989 and recorded a solo album with some members of The Danglin' Bros and others, entitled Workin' on The Nightshift, which was released on Agape records through EMI. This was followed in 1996 by King of the Cross, released on the Massive label. A collection of original and Southern gospel songs.

In 1998, he recorded and self-released Cementville, the title inspired after visiting the town of the same name while driving through Indiana en route to Memphis, Tennessee. in 1997. The album contained bleak and acerbic observations of Australian life.

In 2000, Ian moved to San Francisco and while living in the Mission District continued recording and releasing a number of left of center albums. In 2003 Ian, together with Broadway and cabaret star, Houston Allred, (the son of James V. Allred, 33rd Governor of Texas), "Genetically Challenged Drag queen" Anita Cocktail, her partner Sharon Boggs and Norman Anderson collectively known as The Shakers, performed at various venues in San Francisco, Millbrae and their hometown bar, in Brisbane, California, the infamous 23 Club. The group split somewhat acrimoniously in 2006, and Ian returned to creating new music in the Brisbane environment. In 2004, Ian, along with Brisbanite Sharon De Milo and Australian singer/guitarist, Sally De Jesus recorded and released the self-titled album Capital Expressway. Capital Expressway was recorded in four days and largely improvised. The CD contains original compositions, and has been described as "The Shaggs meet The Stooges". A San Francisco Indie Music Festival review panel described it in so many words, "It seems as though the band is purposefully singing and playing badly, so if this is the intention, why not make it worse?" Since 2006 a compilation series, Eden vol 1 and Eden vol 2, featuring Ian Stephen musical highlights from the past 25 years has also been commercially available.

In June 2006, Ian moved to Orange County, in upstate New York recording and releasing a new CD, Singing Is A Hobby and a Waste of Time, which featured music]al content such as "Amish Man", "U Two Suck on Wheels" and "Welcome to the New Fascism" under a musical banner described as Psychedelic existential urban alternative rock.

In Nov 2009 Ian released "War is Peace" an album psychedelic comedy music, featuring the musical and instrumental contributions of fellow Australians now residing in the US, Keith Glass and Randy Bulpin. John Cobbin and MaryAnne Slavich from Sydney, Australia contributed as well.

In Dec 2006, at Federal Hall National Memorial in New York City Ian became a United States citizen.

In 2010 Ian released "Tea First Then Sex", a 13 track CD of original compositions recorded at "Granite Fortess", an 1895 Romanesque Revival-style Frank Estabrook-designed house, in Upstate New York. Several of these compositions were the result of an earlier project, with Keith Glass involving the poetry of John Laws, which was terminated for reasons unknown. Players on the CD include Randy Bulpin, and Keith Glass, who co-wrote several of the songs. In January 2011, under the nom-de-plume of Sabrage, Ian released "This is Very Gay", a nine track Electronica/Dance CD on the IAW label. Tracks included "Frostcreep", "Velvet Cough" and "Strollermeat" In January 2012 saw the release of "Great Wall of Sound", a completely instrumental project, recorded in Sydney Australia in 2000, and unreleased until the present time.

August 2013 saw the release of "Per Sempre" Ian's 9th album. An album of "love" songs described as "like looking at a Diorama in a natural history museum". To coincide with its release, Ian Stephen and the Imperfectionists. (Johnny Moonlight-guitar, Barry Divola -bass, Mary Anne Slavich -vocals and Tony Slavich- keyboards, and 'Bird' David Two Hill – drums), played a one-off show on 15 August 2013, at the Green Room Lounge in Enmore, NSW. In 2014 Ian Stephen and the Imperfectionists featuring the 2013 line up, minus MaryAnne and Tony Slavich, played a one-off show in August at the Petersham Bowling Club in Sydney Australia. This show was replicated in 2015 with the addition of Graham Osborn on guitar and vocals. On 6 March 2015, Ian released 9, his tenth solo album.

2016 saw the release of Ian's 11th solo album, Uncivilization recorded at the Granite Fortress. Randy Bulpin played guitar on a two of the tracks. In November 2016, a limited pressing, live recording was made available by mail order only. "Far Out Man - Live at the Fortress" Featuring Ian Stephen on guitar and vocals, along with Randy Bulpin on guitar, Scott Kenyon, keyboards, Patrick O'Gorman drums, and Gary Ferraro bass. In 2017 it was decided that all further Ian Stephen releases for the foreseeable future would be under the Far Out Man name. This coincided with the release of Far Out Man - Far Out, a ten track album of original songs, recorded at "The Fortress" in Upstate New York.

In 2018 Far Out Man was effectively mothballed, and Ian Stephen returned to eponymous releases with Insanity in 2019 and International Excellence in 2020. In 2019 Far Out Man was reactivated and released a 'live' album "PayDirt". In 2021 Far Out Man dropped the 'Man' and became Far Out, and began posting YouTube performances recorded live at the Fortress in NY, including a Xmas and Halloween Special. In 2022 Far Out the band continued posting live performances to YouTube, including a 2022 Halloween Special in October.

== Discography ==
- 1979 Ian Stephen's Schizoprenia 4 track 7-inch EP Reverse Records
- 1980 The Armchairs – Ski Lo Lo 4 track 7-inch EP Reverse Records
- 1982 The Armchairs – Party Time! 12-inch LP Reverse Records thru Missing Link
- 1984 The Slaughtermen – Live Naturally 12-inch LP Cleopatra Records
- 1985 The Slaughtermen – Still Lovin' You 12 LP Endtime Communications
- 1986 The Slaughtermen – Melbourne, Memphis and a Mansion in the Sky 12-inch LP Agape records
- 1994 The Slaughtermen – Gospel Gold 23 track CD Massive Records
- 1994 Ian Stephen – King of the Cross – CD Massive Records
- 1998 Ian Stephen – Cementville CD Endtime Communications
- 2004 Capital Expressway – Capital Expressway – Endtime Communications
- 2005 Ian Stephen – Eden Vol 1 Compilation 18 track CD – Endtime Communications
- 2005 Ian Stephen – Eden Vol 2 Compilation 16 track CD – Endtime Communications
- 2006 Suicide Doors – Blue Ribbon Hell – CD Endtime Communications
- 2007 Ian Stephen – Singing is a Hobby and a Waste of Time – CD Endtime Communications
- 2007 The Slaughtermen – Temptation – Compilation CD
- 2009 Ian Stephen – War is Peace CD Endtime Communications
- 2010 Ian Stephen – Tea First Then Sex – CD International Art Wankers
- 2011 Sabrage – This Is Very Gay – CD International Art Wankers
- 2012 Ian Stephen – Great Wall of Sound – Digital download – Endtime
- 2013 Ian Stephen - Per Sempre - CD Endtime
- 2015 Ian Stephen - 9 - CD Endtime
- 2016 Ian Stephen - Uncivilization Endtime
- 2016 Far Out Man - Live at the Fortress - Endtime
- 2017 Far Out Man - Far Out
- 2019 Ian Stephen - Insanity
- 2019 Far Out - Paydirt
- 2020 Ian Stephen - International Excellence
