= Good Humour =

Studio album by Stephen Cummings
- Released: February 1991
- Studio: Platinum Studios, Melbourne
- Genre: Pop rock
- Length: 59:58
- Label: Polydor; True Tone
- Producer: Shane O'Mara; Stephen Cummings

Stephen Cummings chronology
A New Kind of Blue (1989)	Good Humour (1991)	Unguided Tour (1992)

Singles from Good Humour
- 1. "Hell" Released: November 1990; 2. "Family Affair" Released: 18 March 1991; 3. "Stand Up (Love Is the Greatest)" Released: June 1991

Good Humour is the fifth studio album by Australian singer-songwriter Stephen Cummings. The album was released in February 1991 and peaked at number 40 on the Australian ARIA Charts; becoming Cummings' first top 50 album.

== Reception ==
Professional ratings
Review scores
Source	Rating
AllMusic	4/5 stars

David Messer from Rolling Stone Australia gave the album 3 1/2 out of 5 saying "[Cummings] has opted for a record that mixes commercial and contemporary sounds along with his trademark depression and introspection – one half is dance music, the other, ballads. "

== Track listing ==
No.	Title	Writer(s)	Length
1.	"Stand Up (Love Is the Greatest)"	Stephen Cummings; Robert Goodge	3:54
2.	"I Call This Living"	Cummings; Dean Richards; Colin Talbot	3:39
3.	"Ribbons of Darkness"	Cummings; Shane O'Mara; Talbot	3:24
4.	"Hell"	Cummings; Goodge	3:40
5.	"Blue Hour"	Cummings; Abraham	4:43
6.	"Two Or Three Things I Know About Her"	Cummings; O'Mara	3:44
7.	"Don't Look for Trouble"	Cummings; O'Mara; Talbot	4:25
8.	"All Is Well"	Cummings; Richards	4:03
9.	"Family Affair"	Sly Stone	4:42
10.	"Forever and a Day"	Cummings; Richards	3:23
11.	"Heart for Heart"	Cummings; O'Mara	3:35
12.	"Some Place Where the Heart Is Nourished"	Cummings; O'Mara	4:41
13.	"I Promise Not to Come"		2:33
14.	"If I Could Tell You"		4:25
15.	"Life Through the Looking Glass"		4:07

== Charts ==
Chart (1991)	Peak position
Australian Albums (ARIA)	40

== Release history ==
Region	Date	Label	Format	Catalogue
Australia	February 1991	True Tone Records, Polydor Records	Vinyl, CD, Cassette	8476252
