= Stuck on Love =

"Stuck On Love"
- 7-inch single Australian cover

Single by Stephen Cummings

from the album Senso
- B-side: "I Won't Give Up On Your Love"
- Released: May 1983
- Genre: Rock, Pop
- Length: 3:54 (Album version); 4:13 (Extended mix)
- Label: Regular Records, Warner Music Group
- Songwriter(s): Stephen Cummings, Ian Stephen
- Producer(s): Martin Armiger

Stephen Cummings singles chronology
"We All Make Mistakes" (1982)	"Stuck On Love" (1983)	"Back Stabbers" (1983)

"Stuck On Love" is a song by Australian singer-songwriter Stephen Cummings, released in May 1983 through Regular Records label and it became the second single off the album Senso. The song was written by Cummings and Ian Stephen. The B-Side was re-recorded as I Won't Give Up on Love. The song charted at no. 76 on the Kent Music Report.

== Track listing ==
7"
No.	Title	Writer(s)	Length
1.	"Stuck On Love"	Stephen Cummings, Ian Stephen	3:54
2.	"I Won't Give Up On Your Love" (Original version)	Stephen Cummings, Ian Stephen	4:33

12"
No.	Title	Writer(s)	Length
1.	"We All Make Mistakes" (Extended Mix)	Stephen Cummings, Ian Stephen	3:51
2.	"Stuck On Love" (Extended Mix)	Stephen Cummings, Ian Stephen	4:13

== Personnel ==
- Arranged by (brass arrangements) – Greg Flood
- Joe Creighton - Bass, Additional vocals
- Mark Ferry - Bass
- Vince Jones - Cornet (solo)
- Martin Armiger - Drum programming (Drumulator), Guitar, Keyboards
- Peter Luscombe - Drums
- Andrew Pendlebury - Guitar
- Robert Goodge - Guitar
- Duncan Veal - Keyboards
- Jantra de Vilda - Keyboards
- Stephen Bigger - Keyboards
- Ricky Fataar - Percussion
- Venetta Fields - Additional vocals
- Nick Smith - Additional vocals
- Linda Nutter - Additional vocals
- Nick Smith - Additional vocals
- Stephanie Sproul - Additional vocals

== Charts ==
Chart (1983)	Peak position
Australia (Kent Music Report)	76
