= This is Really Something =

Greatest hits album by The Sports
- Released: August 1997
- Recorded: 1977–1981
- Genres: New Wave, rock, pop
- Length: 112:33
- Label: Mushroom

The Sports chronology
Missin' Your Kissin (1987)	This is Really Something (1997)

Alternate cover
- The Definitive Collection (2004)

This is Really Something is a greatest hits album by Australian rock and pop band The Sports, released in August 1997. It was re-released in August 2004 under the title The Definitive Collection.

== Background and release ==
The Sports formed in 1976 and were signed to Mushroom Records in 1977. Their first Australian hit was "Boys! (What Did the Detective Say?)" in 1978 but they cracked the UK chart with "Who Listens to the Radio" in 1979. They broke up in 1981 after just four albums, three of which peaked within the top 20 in Australia.

== Reception ==
Professional ratings
Review scores
Source	Rating
Sydney Morning Herald	4/5 stars
AllMusic	4.5/5 stars

Bernard Zuel of Sydney Morning Herald believes if The Sports had been English they would have been huge. saying ""Boys! (What Did the Detective Say?)" and "Who Listens to the Radio" are classic new wave moments" adding "it's in the collection of could-have-been/should-have-been hits from 1979-81 that this compilation provides its worth. Great pop songs played well - rare enough at any time, a treasure all the time.

Jason Ankeny from AllMusic said "The two-disc, 36-track complete anthology paints a definitive portrait of the Sports' career; split between singles and album tracks (compiled on the first disc) and rare and unreleased material (found on the second), the set is a solid introduction to the work of a sadly underrecognized group, a kind of Australian counterpart to the music of Elvis Costello, Graham Parker or Joe Jackson."

An Amazon reviewer said "This definitive collection features 2CDs each containing the quintessential The Sports tunes including "Who Listens to the Radio", "Don't Throw Stones" and "Strangers on a Train".

== Track listing ==
CD/Cassette(MUSH33011) Disc One
No.	Title	Writer(s)	Album	Length
1.	"Boys! (What Did the Detective Say?)"	Stephen Cummings, Ed Bates Andrew Pendlebury	Reckless	2:27
2.	"When You Walk in the Room"	Jackie DeShannon	Reckless	3:46
3.	"Reckless"	Cummings, Bates Andrew Pendlebury	Reckless	2:32
4.	"I Put a Light On"	Cummings, Bates	Reckless	4:14
5.	"Who Listens to the Radio"	Cummings, Pendlebury	Don't Throw Stones	3:15
6.	"Suspicious Minds"	Martin Armiger	Don't Throw Stones	3:23
7.	"Don't Throw Stones"	Cummings	Don't Throw Stones	3:37
8.	"Wedding Ring"	Stevie Wright/George Young, Harry Vanda	O.K, U.K!	2:04
9.	"Suddenly"	Cummings, Pendlebury	Suddenly	2:35
10.	"Blue Hearts"	Armiger, Cummings	Suddenly	4:05
11.	"Strangers on a Train"	Armiger	Suddenly	2:41
12.	"Perhaps"	Cummings	Suddenly	3:18
13.	"Black Stockings (For Chelsea)"	Armiger, Cummings	Sondra	3:28
14.	"Lucky Shop"	Armiger, Cummings	Sondra	2:20
15.	"How Come"	Armiger, Cummings	Sondra	3:11
16.	"This is Really Something"	Armiger, Cummings	Sondra	2:45
17.	"Stop the Baby Talking"	Cummings, Pendlebury	Sondra	3:06
18.	"Passionette"	Armiger, Cummings	Sondra	2:12

Disc Two
No.	Title	Writer(s)	Album	Length
1.	"Twist Senorita"	Cummings, Bates	Fair Game	2:26
2.	"Cruisin' in a Citroën"	Cummings, Bates	from various artists release Debutantes	2:52
3.	"Reckless (1979 re-recorded version)"	Cummings, Bates Pendlebury	Don't Throw Stones	4:11
4.	"Sunshine Superman"	Donovan	The Sports Play Dylan (and Donovan)	3:11
5.	"Ballad of a Thin Man"	Bob Dylan	The Sports Play Dylan (and Donovan)	4:46
6.	"You're a Big Girl Now"	Dylan	The Sports Play Dylan (and Donovan)	4:02
7.	"Fourth Time Around"	Dylan	The Sports Play Dylan (and Donovan)	2:58
8.	"All the Tired Horses"	Dylan	The Sports Play Dylan (and Donovan)	1:58
9.	"Worst Kind"	Cummings, Pendlebury, Joe Camilleri	Don't Throw Stones	2:48
10.	"Terror Hits"	Armiger	Don't Throw Stones	3:40
11.	"I Fought the Law"	Sonny Curtis	previously unreleased	2:00
12.	"When I Write This Book"	Cummings, Pendlebury	previously unreleased	3:48
13.	"Drug Sluts"	Armiger, Cummings	b-side of "How Come" single	2:54
14.	"O Narcissus"	Armiger, Cummings	previously unreleased	2:32
15.	"All The Girls"	Armiger, Cummings	previously unreleased	3:21
16.	"Can't Ever Decide"	Cummings, Pendlebury	Live at Bombay Rock	3:25
17.	"Hit Single"	Armiger	Live at Bombay Rock	3:38
18.	"Live Work and Play"	Cummings, Pendlebury	Live at Bombay Rock	3:04
