= The Sports discography =

- Studio albums: 4
- EPs: 3
- Live albums: 2
- Compilation albums: 3
- Singles: 14

This is the discography of The Sports, a popular Australian rock group which performed and released four studio albums between 1976 and 1981.

== Albums ==
=== Studio albums ===
List of albums, with selected chart positions and certifications
Title	Album details	Peak chart positions		Certifications
Title	Album details	AUS	USA	Certifications
Reckless	Released: May 1978; Label: Mushroom Records (L 36571)	43	-	
Don't Throw Stones	Released: February 1979; Label: Mushroom Records (L 36844)	9	194	AUS: Gold
Suddenly	Released: March 1980; Label: Mushroom Records (L 37131)	13	-	
Sondra	Released: May 1981; Label: Mushroom Records (L37552)	20	-	

=== Live albums ===
Title	Album details
Missin' Your Kissin'	Released: 1987; Label: Raven Records (RVLP-28); Recorded in Melbourne in 1978
The Sports Live At Billboard 1981	Released: 2 August 2024; Label: The Sports / ACRA Desk; Recorded in Melbourne in 1981

=== Compilation albums ===
List of albums, with selected chart positions and certifications
Title	Album details	Peak chart positions
Title	Album details	AUS
All Sports	Released: December 1982; Label: Mushroom Records (RML 53027)	35
This Is Really Something: The Complete Anthology	Released: August 1997; 2-CD set; Label: Mushroom Records (MUSH33011)	-
The Definitive Collection (The Sports album)	Released: August 2004; 2-CD set; Label: Festival Records (337762)	-

=== Extended plays ===
List of albums, with selected chart positions and certifications
Title	EP details	Peak chart positions
Title	EP details	AUS
Fair Game	Released: 1977; Limited to 500 copies; Label: Zac Records (ZR 001)	-
O.K, U.K!	Released: August 1979; Label: Mushroom Records (X 13052)	-
The Sports Play Dylan (and Donovan)	Released: November 1981; Label: Mushroom Records (L-20007)	70

== Singles ==
Year	Title	Peak chart positions	Album
Year	Title	AUS	Album
1978	"Boys! (What Did the Detective Say?)"	55	Reckless
1978	"When You Walk in the Room"	42	Reckless
1978	"Who Listens to the Radio"	35	Don't Throw Stones
1979	"Don't Throw Stones"	26	Don't Throw Stones
1979	"Suspicious Minds"	74	Don't Throw Stones
1979	"Wedding Ring"	40	O.K, U.K!
1980	"Strangers on a Train"	22	Suddenly!
1980	"Perhaps"	-	Suddenly!
1980	"Stop the Baby Talking"	-	non album single
1980	"No Mama No" (US only)	-	Suddenly!
1981	"How Come"	21	Sondra
1981	"When We Go Out Tonight"	-	Sondra
1981	"Sunshine Superman"	72	The Sports Play Dylan (and Donovan)
1982	"Black Stockings (For Chelsea)"	-	All Sports
