= All Sports =

Greatest hits album by The Sports
- Released: December 1982
- Recorded: 1977–1981
- Genre: New wave, rock, pop
- Label: Mushroom

The Sports chronology
The Sports Play Dylan (and Donovan) (1981)	All Sports (1982)	Missin' Your Kissin' (1987)

Singles from Suddenly
- 1. "Black Stockings (For Chelsea)" Released: November 1982

All Sports is the first greatest hits album by Australian rock and pop band The Sports, released in December 1982. The album peaked at number 35 on the Australian Kent Music Report.

== Reception ==
Professional ratings
Review scores
Source	Rating
AllMusic	4/5 stars

Steve Schnee from AllMusic said "This collection compiles the best singles, a few album tracks, and alternate recordings, creating a fun stroll through the musical history of one of Australia's pub rock greats." but said it's "one of the ugliest album covers in musical history".

== Track listing ==
Vinyl/cassette (L 19229) Side one
No.	Title	Writer(s)	Length
1.	"Boys! (What Did the Detective Say?)"	Stephen Cummings, Ed Bates
2.	"When You Walk in the Room"	Jackie DeShannon
3.	"Reckless"	Cummings, Bates Andrew Pendlebury
4.	"Don't Throw Stones"	Cummings
5.	"Suspicious Minds"	Martin Armiger
6.	"Live Work and Play"	Cummings, Pendlebury
7.	"Big Sleep"	Cummings, Pendlebury
8.	"Who Listens to the Radio"	Cummings, Pendlebury

Side two
No.	Title	Writer(s)	Length
1.	"Wedding Ring"	Stevie Wright, George Young, Harry Vanda
2.	"The Lost and the Lonely"	Cummings, Pendlebury
3.	"Perhaps"	Cummings
4.	"Strangers on a Train"	Armiger
5.	"Black Stockings (For Chelsea)"	Armiger, Cummings
6.	"Blue Hearts"	Armiger, Cummings
7.	"Stop the Baby Talking"	Armiger, Cummings
8.	"How Come"	Armiger, Cummings

== Charts ==
Chart (1982/83)	Peak position
Australian Kent Music Report	35
