= Bruce Clarke (musician) =

Australian jazz guitarist and composer

Bruce Clarke OAM (1 December 1925 – 24 July 2008) was an Australian jazz guitarist, composer, and educator.

== Biography ==
One of Clarke's early music teachers was the New Zealander Tui Hamilton, at the Melbourne Hawaiian Club, from the early 1940s. Clarke played guitar in professional jazz ensembles, and from the late 1940s to mid 1950s he worked as a session musician for radio orchestras. Clarke accompanied musicians on their tours of Australia played in dance halls and ballrooms.

After the advent of television in Australia in 1956, Clarke started a recording studio and production company named The Jingle Workshop. He performed in thousands of recordings for films, television programs, and commercials, playing guitar and/or synthesizer. He was president of the International Society of Contemporary Music. He accepted a commission to realize the first major Australian electronic work for the 1968 Adelaide Festival of Arts and conducted performances in Melbourne of works by 20th-century composers Karlheinz Stockhausen, Luciano Berio, and Anton Webern.

He went on tour in Europe as a member of Felix Werder's ensemble Australia Felix. He accompanied classical guitarist John Williams with the Melbourne Symphony Orchestra in Concerto for Guitar and Orchestra written by Andre Previn. In 1977 he founded the Jazz Studies program at Victorian College of the Arts. He ran his own music tuition school, Guitar Workshop, and wrote for the magazine Jamm

During the late seventies he taught guitar using the Berklee method books and his pre-recorded cassette tapes. His students include Mick Harvey, Robert Goodge (of I'm Talking), Peter Farnan, Pierre Jaquinot, Laszlo Sirsom, Mark Cally, Anne McCue, Doug de Vries, Dominic Kiernan, Barry Morton, and Andrew Pendlebury (of The Sports).

He founded Cumquat Records to issue recordings of Australian jazz. He worked with Frank Sinatra, Mel Torme, Dizzy Gillespie, Stephane Grappelli, Stan Getz, and John Collins.
