= Don't Hold Back That Feeling =

Studio album by Andrew Pendlebury
- Released: May 1992
- Genre: Jazz; pop
- Length: 49:04
- Label: EastWest
- Producer: Andrew Pendlebury; Paul Kosky

Andrew Pendlebury chronology
Zing Went the Strings (1990)	Don't Hold Back That Feeling (1992)	Karate (1993)

Don't Hold Back That Feeling is the fourth studio album by Australian musician, Andrew Pendlebury, released in 1992. At the ARIA Music Awards of 1993 the album won Best Adult Contemporary Album.

== Background ==
Australian guitarist Andrew Pendlebury's fourth solo studio album, Don't Hold Back That Feeling, was released in May 1992. For his previous album Zing Went the Strings (1990) he worked with Pete Linden on pedal steel guitar, Paul Grabowsky on piano, Stephen Hadley on bass guitar, J. J. Hacket on drums, as well as Stephen Cummings, Doug de Vries, Shane O'Mara, Nick Smith and Michael Williams.

For Don't Hold Back That Feeling he enlisted guest vocalists Kate Ceberano, Deborah Conway, Dave Steel and Chris Wilson. Session musicians included members from Ceberano's backing band Ministry of Fun: Stephen Hadley on bass guitar, Peter Jones on drums and Jex Saarlehart on keyboards. It was critically acclaimed and, the following year, won Best Adult Contemporary Album at the ARIA Music Awards of 1993.

== Track listing ==
Don't Hold Back That Feeling
No.	Title	Writer(s)	Length
1.	"Tired of Me" (featuring Chris Wilson)	Stephen Cummings, Andrew Pendlebury	5:01
2.	"Summertime"	George Gershwin	6:15
3.	"Liberty Blues" (featuring Deborah Conway)	Dorland Bray, Pendlebury	4:24
4.	"Very Early"	Bill Evans, J McLauchlan	1;48
5.	"Crime of Time"	Pendlebury	3:58
6.	"Calling You" (featuring Kate Ceberano)	Robert Telson, Pendelbury, Ceberano	4:09
7.	"Trinidad"	Pendlebury	3:56
8.	"Don't Hold Back That Feeling" (featuring Chris Wilson)	Kevin Glenn Gullifer Hopkins-Smith, Russell Kinross-Smith	6:16
9.	"Barfly"	Pendlebury	1:18
10.	"Deep Water"	Jimmy Bryant, Pendlebury
11.	"Silvertown" (featuring Dave Steel)	Pendlebury, Steel	3:16
12.	"There, There"	Jex Saarlehart	0:52
13.	"Sunrise" (featuring Kate Ceberano)	Mark Seymour, Pendlebury	5:37
Total length:			49:04
