= I Was Blown Away =

Single by Pam Tillis

from the album Sweetheart's Dance
- B-side: "Calico Plains"
- Released: March 11, 1995
- Genre: Country
- Length: 2:45
- Label: Arista
- Songwriter: Layng Martine Jr.
- Producers: Pam Tillis, Steve Fishell

Pam Tillis singles chronology
"Mi Vida Loca (My Crazy Life)" (1994)	"I Was Blown Away" (1995)	"In Between Dances" (1995)

"I Was Blown Away" is a song written by Layng Martine Jr. and recorded by American country music artist Pam Tillis. It was released in March 1995 as the fourth single from her album Sweetheart's Dance. The song reached number 16 on the Billboard Hot Country Singles & Tracks chart.

== Content ==
Tillis withdrew the song after receiving letters from families of victims of the 1995 Oklahoma City bombing.

== Critical reception ==
An uncredited review in Billboard stated that "she sings her heart out, but not even she can hold up this cliché‑ridden song."

== Personnel ==
Compiled from liner notes.

- Mike Brignardello — bass guitar
- Paul Franklin — steel guitar
- Rob Hajacos — fiddle
- Brent Mason — electric guitar
- Terry McMillan — harmonica
- Steve Nathan — piano
- Suzi Ragsdale — background vocals
- Pam Tillis — lead vocals, background vocals
- Biff Watson — acoustic guitar
- Lonnie Wilson — drums

== Chart performance ==
Chart (1995)	Peak position
Canada Country Singles (RPM)	20
US Hot Country Songs (Billboard)	16
