= Deep Down (song) =

Single by Pam Tillis

from the album All of This Love
- B-side: "Tequila Mockingbird"
- Released: October 9, 1995
- Studio: Sound Emporium (Nashville, Tennessee)
- Genre: Country
- Length: 3:20
- Label: Arista Nashville
- Songwriters: Walt Aldridge, John Jarrard
- Producers: Pam Tillis, Mike Poole

Pam Tillis singles chronology
| "In Between Dances" (1995) | "Deep Down" (1995) | "The River and the Highway" (1996) |

"Deep Down" is a song written by Walt Aldridge and John Jarrard, and recorded by American country music artist Pam Tillis. It was released in October 1995 as the first single from the album All of This Love. The song reached #6 on the Billboard Hot Country Singles & Tracks chart.

== Personnel ==
Per liner notes.

- Bruce Bouton – pedal steel guitar
- Sam Bush – mandolin
- Larry Byrom – acoustic guitar
- Thom Flora – backing vocals
- Larry Franklin – fiddle
- Jeff King – electric guitar
- Liana Manis – backing vocals
- Steve Nathan – piano
- Tom Roady – percussion
- Brent Rowan – electric guitar
- Milton Sledge – drums
- Pam Tillis – vocals
- Willie Weeks – bass guitar

== Chart performance ==
| Chart (1995–1996) | Peak position |
|---|---|
| Canada Country Singles (RPM) | 2 |
| US Hot Country Songs (Billboard) | 6 |

=== Year-end charts ===
| Chart (1996) | Position |
|---|---|
| Canada Country Tracks (RPM) | 84 |
