= The River and the Highway =

Single by Pam Tillis

from the album All of This Love
- B-side: "All of This Love"
- Released: January 27, 1996
- Studio: Sound Emporium (Nashville, Tennessee)
- Genre: Country
- Length: 4:21 (album version); 3:50 (greatest hits edit)
- Label: Arista
- Songwriters: Gerry House, Don Schlitz
- Producers: Pam Tillis, Mike Poole

Pam Tillis singles chronology
"Deep Down" (1996)	"The River and the Highway" (1996)	"It's Lonely Out There" (1996)

"The River and the Highway" is a song written by Gerry House and Don Schlitz, and recorded by American country music artist Pam Tillis. It was released in January 1996 as the second single from the album All of This Love. The song reached number 8 on the Billboard Hot Country Singles & Tracks chart.

== Content ==
The song is a ballad using a river and a highway as metaphors for a man and woman who are incompatible but whose lives intertwine. The woman is symbolized as the river in that she "follows the path of least resistance" and "twists and turns with no regard to distance", while the man is "headed for a single destination".

== Personnel ==
Per liner notes.

- Eddie Bayers – drums
- Bruce Bouton – pedal steel guitar
- Dann Huff – electric guitar
- Ronn Huff – string arrangements
- Bill Hullett – electric guitar
- Liana Manis – backing vocals
- Matt Rollings – piano
- Pam Tillis – vocals
- Billy Joe Walker Jr. – acoustic guitar
- Glenn Worf – bass guitar
- Nashville String Machine – string section

== Critical reception ==
Deborah Evans Price of Billboard praised the lyrics as "powerful poetic allegory at its very best". She also said that the song had a "pretty melody" and is "[q]uite possibly the best record in an already distinguished career."

== Chart performance ==
Chart (1996)	Peak position
Canada Country Singles (RPM)	14
US Hot Country Songs (Billboard)	8

=== Year-end charts ===
Chart (1996)	Position
US Country Songs (Billboard)	71
