= All of This Love =

Studio album by Pam Tillis
- Released: November 7, 1995
- Studios: Sound Emporium, Soundshop Recording Studios and Woodland Studios (Nashville, Tennessee)
- Genre: Country
- Length: 38:35
- Label: Arista Nashville
- Producers: Pam Tillis; Mike Poole

Pam Tillis chronology
Sweetheart's Dance (1994)	All of This Love (1995)	Greatest Hits (1997)

Singles from All of This Love
- 1. "Deep Down" Released: October 7, 1995; 2. "The River and the Highway" Released: January 27, 1996; 3. "It's Lonely Out There" Released: May 1996; 4. "Betty's Got a Bass Boat" Released: September 1996

All of This Love is the fifth studio album by American country music artist Pam Tillis, released on November 7, 1995, via Arista Records. The album reached #25 on the Billboard country albums charts. Singles from the album were "Deep Down" at a #6 peak on the Hot Country Singles chart, "The River and the Highway" at #8, "It's Lonely Out There" at #14, and "Betty's Got a Bass Boat" at #62, her first single since the late 1980s to miss Top 40 entirely. Bruce Hornsby's "Mandolin Rain" is covered on this album as well. The album has been certified Gold for shipments of over 500,000 units in the U.S.

== Critical reception ==
Billboard published a positive review which stated that Tillis "continues to mature as a singer".

== Track listing ==
No.	Title	Writer(s)	Length
1.	"Deep Down"	Walt Aldridge, John Jarrard	3:20
2.	"Mandolin Rain"	Bruce Hornsby, John Hornsby	3:24
3.	"Sunset Red and Pale Moonlight"	Angelo Petraglia, Kim Richey	3:31
4.	"It's Lonely Out There"	Bob DiPiero, Pam Tillis	3:23
5.	"The River and the Highway"	Gerry House, Don Schlitz	4:21
6.	"You Can't Have a Good Time Without Me"	Lewis Anderson, Lisa Silver, Russell Smith	3:31
7.	"Betty's Got a Bass Boat"	Bernie Nelson, Craig Wiseman	3:53
8.	"Tequila Mockingbird"	P. Tillis, Sonny Tillis	5:00
9.	"No Two Ways About It"	Greg Barnhill, Kim Carnes, Vince Melamed	4:20
10.	"All of This Love"	John Paul Daniel, Chapin Hartford, Jule Medders	3:48

== Personnel ==
Per liner notes.

- Pam Tillis – vocals, backing vocals (1, 4, 6, 7, 10), impromptu clogging (8)
- Steve Nathan – piano (1, 4, 7, 9, 10), synthesizers (9)
- Reese Wynans – piano (2)
- Matt Rollings – piano (3, 5, 6)
- Joan Besen – Casiotone (10)
- Larry Byrom – acoustic guitar (1, 7, 9, 10), electric guitar (4)
- Jeff King – electric guitar (1)
- Brent Rowan – electric guitar (1, 7)
- Billy Joe Walker Jr. – acoustic guitar (2, 3, 5, 6)
- Dann Huff – electric guitar (2, 4, 5, 9, 10)
- Dan Dugmore – acoustic guitar (3, 4, 8), electric guitar solo (3)
- Bill Hullett – acoustic guitar (3), electric guitar (3, 5, 6)
- Billy Crain – acoustic guitar (8)
- Verlon Thompson – acoustic guitar (8)
- Biff Watson – acoustic guitar solo (9)
- Bruce Bouton – pedal steel guitar (1–7, 9, 10)
- Sam Bush – mandolin (1, 10), fiddle (8)
- Marty Stuart – mandolin (2)
- Bernie Leadon – banjo (2)
- Willie Weeks – bass guitar (1, 4, 7, 9, 10)
- Glenn Worf – bass guitar (2, 3, 5, 6)
- Milton Sledge – drums (1, 4, 7, 9, 10)
- Eddie Bayers – drums (2, 3, 5, 6)
- Tom Roady – percussion (1, 3, 4, 7, 8)
- Larry Franklin – fiddle (1, 3, 7, 10)
- Tammy Rogers – fiddle (6)
- Charlie McCoy – harmonica (6)
- Thom Flora – backing vocals (1)
- Liana Manis – backing vocals (1, 3, 5–7)
- Claire Lynch – backing vocals (2, 8)
- Harry Stinson – backing vocals (3)
- Jennifer Kimball – backing vocals (4)
- Dennis Wilson – backing vocals (7)
- Jeff White – backing vocals (8)
- Suzi Ragsdale – backing vocals (9)
- Mary Ann Kennedy – backing vocals (10)
- Neil Thrasher – backing vocals (10)

Nashville String Machine on "The River and the Highway"

- Ronn Huff – arrangements and conductor
- Carl Gorodetzky – contractor
- David Angell, John Catchings, David Davidson, Conni Ellisor, Jim Grosjean, Anthony LaMarchina, Lee Larrison, Jeff Lippencott, Bob Mason, Craig Nelson, Pamela Sixfin, Alan Umstead, Gary Vanosdale, Mary Kathryn Vanosdale and Kristin Wilkinson – string players

== Production ==
- Pam Tillis – producer
- Mike Poole – associate producer, recording
- Ken Hutton – assistant engineer
- Carl Meadows – assistant engineer
- Paula Montondo – assistant engineer
- Justin Niebank – mixing (1, 4, 8, 10)
- Mike Bradley – mixing (2, 3, 5–7, 9)
- Mark Frigo – mix assistant (1, 4, 8, 10)
- Mark Capps – mix assistant (2, 3, 5–7, 9)
- Denny Purcell – mastering at Georgetown Masters (Nashville, Tennessee)
- Ginny Johnson – production coordinator
- Maude Gilman – art direction
- Buddy Jackson – art direction
- Beth Middleworth – design
- Peter Nash – photography
- Claudia Fowler – stylist
- Teresa Glasser – hair stylist
- Ina Vistica – make-up
- Mike Robertson – management

== Charts ==
=== Weekly charts ===
Chart (1995)	Peak position
Canadian Country Albums (RPM)	21
US Billboard 200	151
US Top Country Albums (Billboard)	25

=== Year-end charts ===
Chart (1996)	Position
US Top Country Albums (Billboard)	67
