= Sad and Lonely and Blue =

1965 single by the Easybeats

- Australian record label

Single by the Easybeats

from the album It's 2 Easy
- B-side: "Easy As Can Be"
- Released: 4 November 1965
- Recorded: October 1965
- Studio: EMI, Sydney
- Genre: Jangle pop
- Length: 2:10
- Label: Albert; Parlophone
- Songwriters: Stevie Wright; George Young
- Producer: Ted Albert

The Easybeats Australian singles chronology
"Wedding Ring" (1965)	"Sad and Lonely and Blue" (1965)	"Women (Make You Feel Alright)" (1966)

Audio
- "Sad and Lonely and Blue" on YouTube

"Sad and Lonely and Blue" is a song written by Stevie Wright and George Young, recorded by their band the Easybeats in 1965. The song was written in response to the group being labelled as "pop musicians" from their previous singles "She's So Fine" and Wedding Ring" along with their debut album Easy. The song is based around a 12-string guitar riff played by guitarist Harry Vanda and sees influences in both British rhythm and blues and jangle pop. Released as a single on 4 November 1965, it was a chart failure compared to their previous releases, only reaching number 21 on the Kent Music Report.

== Background and composition ==
By mid-1965, the Easybeats had established themselves as the most popular band in Australia, owing to their two top-ten singles "She's So Fine" and "Wedding Ring", both upbeat pop songs regarding love. Their popularity in Australia was comparable to Beatlemania, and the press dubbed this phenomenon as "Easyfever" in response. In September of that year, their debut album, Easy was released. Eight out of the 14 songs on the album were composed by lead vocalist Stevie Wright and rhythm guitarist George Young, also establishing them as songwriters. Most of the material on that album was upbeat pop in the vein of the aforementioned two singles, deriving inspiration primarily from Merseybeat and British rhythm and blues. However, some band members grew dismayed over their music being labelled as pop.

"Sad and Lonely and Blue" was written in an effort to steer away from this labelling, written with "complex harmonies" from Wright, Young and lead guitarist Harry Vanda, along with a catchy melody. On the song, Vanda plays a twelve-string electric guitar, giving it a distinct "Byrds-esque" feel of jangle pop, while simultaneously incorporating rhythm and blues elements from their debut single "For My Woman (1965). As performed by the Easybeats, "Sad and Lonely and Blue" was written in the key of B major, characterized by Vanda's alternating guitar strokes, to which bassist Dick Diamonde provides a counter-melody in between strums. Lyrically, the song revolves around longing for a partner, complete with themes of heartbreak and loneliness, departing from the previously positive lyrics of their previous songs.

== Release ==
"Sad and Lonely and Blue" was released as the Easybeats fourth single on 4 November 1965, backed by "Easy As Can Be", a song boasting influences from both rhythm and blues and folk rock. Released through Albert Productions and distributed by Parlophone, the single was what Young described as "sort of a bomb for us". At the time of the single's release, Australia did not have a unified national record chart and instead, every major Australian city had their own chart, which meant that airplay of the single was never concentrated across the whole country at the same time. In the estimations of David Kent's retrospective Kent Music Report, the song only reached number 21 nationally, as opposed to both "She's So Fine" and "Wedding Ring" which were top-10 singles.

It was the Easybeats' lowest charting since their debut "For My Woman", which reached number 33, and would remain their biggest chart failure until 1967's "The Music Goes 'Round My Head". The low charting amidst the height of their popularity has sometimes been attributed to the single's overall somber mood, which resulted in Young stating that the band gave in, "giving the kids what they wanted", with the follow-up single "Women (Make You Feel Alright)" (1966). "Sad and Lonely and Blue" and its B-side were included on the February 1966 EP Easy As Can Be, before being included on their second studio album It's 2 Easy on 24 March 1966.

== Charts ==
Chart performance for "Sad and Lonely and Blue"
Chart (1965)	Peak position
Australia (Kent Music Report)	21
