= In Between Dances =

Single by Pam Tillis

from the album Sweetheart's Dance
- B-side: "They Don't Break 'Em Like They Used To"
- Released: June 5, 1995
- Genre: Country
- Length: 3:40
- Label: Arista
- Songwriters: Craig Bickhardt, Barry Alfonso
- Producers: Pam Tillis, Steve Fishell

Pam Tillis singles chronology
"I Was Blown Away" (1995)	"In Between Dances" (1995)	"Deep Down" (1995)

"In Between Dances" is a song written by Craig Bickhardt and Barry Alfonso, and recorded by American country music artist Pam Tillis. It was released in June 1995 as the fifth and final single from the album Sweetheart's Dance. The song reached number 3 on the Billboard Hot Country Singles & Tracks chart.

== Personnel ==
Compiled from liner notes.

- Mike Brignardello — bass guitar
- Paul Franklin — steel guitar
- Rob Hajacos — fiddle
- Brent Mason — electric guitar
- Steve Nathan — piano
- Pam Tillis — lead vocals, background vocals
- Biff Watson — acoustic guitar
- Lonnie Wilson — drums

== Chart performance ==
Chart (1995)	Peak position
Canada Country Singles (RPM)	7
US Hot Country Songs (Billboard)	3

=== Year-end charts ===
Chart (1995)	Position
Canada Country Tracks (RPM)	97
US Country Songs (Billboard)	32
