= It's 2 Easy =

Studio album by the Easybeats
- Released: 24 March 1966
- Recorded: 1965–1966
- Studio: Armstrong, Melbourne; EMI, Sydney
- Genre: Beat
- Length: 32:55
- Label: Parlophone/Albert
- Producer: Ted Albert

The Easybeats Australian chronology
Easy (1965)	It's 2 Easy (1966)	Volume 3 (1966)

Singles from It's 2 Easy
- 1. "Wedding Ring" Released: August 1965; 2. "Sad and Lonely and Blue" Released: October 1965; 3. "Women (Make You Feel Alright)" Released: January 1966; 4. "Come and See Her" Released: April 1966

It's 2 Easy is the second studio album by the Australian rock band the Easybeats. Released on 24 March 1966, the album featured four hit singles; "Wedding Ring", "Sad and Lonely and Blue", "Women (Make Me Feel Alright)" and "Come And See Her".

== Production ==
The album was recorded during their tour of Melbourne at Armstrong Studios and at EMI Studios in Sydney. Once again, the production was handled by Ted Albert. The album combines their recent singles ("Wedding Ring", "Sad and Lonely and Blue" and "Women (Make You Feel Alright)") with nine new recordings.

== Releases ==
It was released by Albert Productions on the Parlophone label in Australia on 24 March 1966. The album was only released in mono; no stereo mix was made. It was reissued by Albert Productions (this time on their own label) in the 1980s on LP and compact disc. Reissue label Repertoire Records later released the album in 1992 with eleven bonus tracks. These included b-sides, 1966's Easyfever E.P., album outtakes, alternate mixes from the Good Friday album and an outtake from the group's audition session at EMI Studios, London.

== Reception ==
Professional ratings
Review scores
Source	Rating
AllMusic	4/5 stars

AllMusic wrote a positive review of the album saying "Most of this album is a respectable piece of mainstream rock & roll, inspired and full of surprises". The album did very well commercially in Australia, reaching No. 3 on the national charts.

== Track listing ==
=== Side A ===
All tracks are written by Stevie Wright & George Young except as noted.

No.	Title	Length
1.	"Let Me Be"	2:09
2.	"You Are the Light"	1:56
3.	"Women (Make You Feel Alright)"	2:37
4.	"Come and See Her"	2:43
5.	"I'll Find Somebody to Take Your Place"	3:04
6.	"Someway, Somewhere"	2:22
7.	"Easy As Can Be"	2:34

=== Side B ===
No.	Title	Writer(s)	Length
1.	"I Can See"		2:14
2.	"Sad and Lonely and Blue"		2:17
3.	"Somethin' Wrong"		2:18
4.	"In My Book"		3:10
5.	"What About Our Love"	Snowy Fleet	1:56
6.	"Then I'll Tell You Goodbye"	Harry Vanda, Young	2:35
7.	"Wedding Ring"		2:03

1992 Repertoire Records CD reissue bonus tracks
No.	Title	Writer(s)	Length
15.	"Me or You" (B-side to "Wedding Ring")	Wright, Vanda	3:07
16.	"Too Much" (Easyfever EP)	Vanda, Wright, Young	1:49
17.	"I'll Make You Happy" (Easyfever EP)		3:11
18.	"A Very Special Man" (Easyfever EP)		2:23
19.	"Trying So Hard" (Easyfever EP)		2:49
20.	"Friday on My Mind" (listed as mono version, is actually a folddown stereo mix)	Vanda, Young	2:44
21.	"Made My Bed Gonna Lie in It" (alternate stereo remix)	Vanda, Young	2:16
22.	"Happy Is the Man" (alternate stereo remix)	Vanda, Young	2:56
23.	"How You Doing Now" (studio outtake)		2:02
24.	"All Gone Boy" (Originally recorded during the Good Friday sessions. Released in 1968 on the Easyfever Vol. 2 EP.)	Vanda, Young	2:16
25.	"Mandy" (outtake from the EMI Studios, London sessions – August 1966)	George Young	2:17

== Personnel ==
The Easybeats

- Stevie Wright - vocals, percussion, electric organ
- Harry Vanda - vocals, lead guitar, 12-string guitar
- George Young - vocals, rhythm guitar, electric organ
- Dick Diamonde - vocals, bass guitar
- Snowy Fleet - vocals, bongo, drums

Production Team

- Ted Albert - producer
- Ian Morgan - front cover photography
- Tony Geary - liner notes

== Charts ==
Chart	Peak position
Australian Albums	3
