= All the Tired Horses =

1970 song by Bob Dylan

"All The Tired Horses"

Song by Bob Dylan

from the album Self Portrait
- Released: June 8, 1970
- Genre: Folk
- Length: 3:14
- Label: Columbia
- Songwriter: Bob Dylan
- Producer: Bob Johnston

"All the Tired Horses" is a song written by Bob Dylan, released on his 1970 double album Self Portrait.

The song is the first track on the album. It is most notable for its absence of Dylan's singing. It consists of a small choir of female voices (Hilda Harris, Albertine Robinson, and Maeretha Stewart) repeating the same two lines

All the tired horses in the sun
How'm I s'posed to get any ridin' done? Hmm.

to the same melody for 3 minutes and 14 seconds, with varying instrumental accompaniment. The chord progression is I-vi-iii-V in the key of C major (C-Am-Em-G).

== Cover versions ==
- The Sports: The Sports Play Dylan (and Donovan) (1981)
- Tim Heidecker & The Earth Is A Man (2012) (single)
- Tobacco City (2021)
- Lisa O'Neill (2022)
- Anna Calvi (2022)
