= Mi Vida Loca (My Crazy Life) =

Single by Pam Tillis

from the album Sweetheart's Dance
- B-side: "Ancient History"
- Released: November 7, 1994
- Genre: Country
- Length: 2:50
- Label: Arista Nashville
- Songwriters: Jess Leary; Pam Tillis
- Producers: Pam Tillis; Steve Fishell

Pam Tillis singles chronology
"When You Walk in the Room" (1994)	"Mi Vida Loca (My Crazy Life)" (1994)	"I Was Blown Away" (1995)

"Mi Vida Loca (My Crazy Life)" is a song co-written and recorded by American country music artist Pam Tillis. It was released in November 1994 as the third single from the album, Sweetheart's Dance. She co-wrote the song with Jess Leary, and co-produced it with Steve Fishell. The song is Tillis' only number-one single on the Billboard country charts and earned her a second nomination for the Grammy Award for Best Female Country Vocal Performance.

== Background and writing ==
Tillis said the idea for the song came when she was watching the talk show Geraldo and saw a guest with a tattoo reading "mi vida loca", which is Spanish for "my crazy life". She presented the idea to co-writer Jess Leary, who came up with a "Tex-Mex/salsa kind of groove". Leary was initially unsure if the song's title would present difficulty to radio programmers.

== Critical reception ==
Deborah Evans Price, of Billboard magazine reviewed the song favorably, saying that the song has a "south-of-the-border Bo Diddley feel."

== Music video ==
The music video was directed by Roger Pistole and premiered in late 1994.

== Personnel ==
Compiled from album liner notes.

- Dan Dugmore — acoustic guitar
- John Barlow Jarvis — accordion
- John Jorgenson — electric and acoustic guitars, mandolin
- Greg Leisz — pedal steel guitar
- Suzi Ragsdale — backing vocals
- Milton Sledge — drums
- Harry Stinson — percussion
- Pam Tillis — vocals
- Biff Watson — acoustic guitar
- Willie Weeks — bass guitar

== Chart positions ==
"Mi Vida Loca (My Crazy Life)" debuted at number 55 on the U.S. Billboard Hot Country Singles & Tracks for the week of November 19, 1994.

Chart (1994–1995)	Peak position
Canada Country Singles (RPM)	1
US Hot Country Songs (Billboard)	1

=== Year-end charts ===
Chart (1995)	Position
Canada Country Tracks (RPM)	41
US Country Songs (Billboard)	36
