= Christine Sullivan =

Australian singer

Christine Sullivan (born in Hobart, Tasmania) is an Australian singer.

Her early interest was in contemporary folk and rock idioms, but like her idol Joni Mitchell developed an interest in modern jazz, which she approaches in her own personal style.

She moved to Melbourne in 1986, studying classical technique at the Melba Conservatorium, also with American soul, gospel and session vocalist, Venetta Fields.

While working at the Limerick Arms in Melbourne in 1990, Christine was heard by British Jazz impresario Ronnie Scott, who invited her to perform at his famous club in London. She performed there later that year, with Chico Freeman and Brainstorm and again in 1992, opening for Chucho Valdés and Irakere.

She was a competitor (unplaced) in the Thelonious Monk International Jazz Competition in Washington, D.C. in 1998. The judging panel included Dianne Reeves, Nnenna Freelon, Diana Krall, Dee Dee Bridgewater and Joe Williams. The band backing the competitors included Norman Simmons, Grady Tate and bassist Michael Bowie

She has performed at many Australian jazz festivals: the Wangaratta Festival of Jazz, the Melbourne International Jazz Festival and the biennial Brisbane Festival.

She has performed as guest or lead vocalist with James Morrison, Paul Grabowsky, Don Burrows, Graeme Lyall, Tony Gould, percussionist Alex Pertout, Chad Wackerman, guitarist Doug de Vries, David Hirschfelder, Slava Grigoryan, Joe Chindamo, drummer David Jones, bassist Jeremy Alsop, Art Garfunkel, Randy Crawford and Kurt Elling.

She is a regular performer at such venues as Bennetts Lane, The Limerick Arms and Dizzy's Jazz Bar in Melbourne and The Basement in Sydney.

== Selected performances ==
- Ronnie Scott's, London 1990
- Ronnie Scott's, London 1992
- "Live on Stage" at the Continental Cafe for ABC Radio National 1997
- "Live on Stage" for ABC Radio National 22 August 2001
- "Live on Stage" for ABC Radio National 2002
- "The Boite Winter Concert" 3 March 2002
- "Live on Stage" for ABC Radio National 14 November 2003
- "Music Deli" Federation Square concert for ABC Radio National 31 May 2003
- Shanghai International Spring Festival 2001 w/ Wang Zheng-Ting
- "Live on Stage" for ABC Radio National 2006 w/ pianist Andy Milne

== Movie soundtracks ==
Sullivan contributed to the soundtracks on:

- The Missing for Manuela Alberti 1999
- Molokai: The Story of Father Damien for Paul Cox 1999
- Innocence for Paul Cox 2000

== Discography ==
under her own name

- Nine Steps to Heaven (a gospel LP long out of print)
- It's About Time (1991) Larrikin LRF257
- Live at Mietta's (1993) Larrikin LRF297
- Here and Now (1997) Larrikin LRF482
- Bloom (1999) Festival/Walkabout LRF520
- "Morning Star" (never released?)
- Away (2010) Fuse

as a contributing artist

- "Holywell" for Joe Creighton (1994) Innisfree CD
- "Hot Food Cool Jazz" (1995) book plus CD package
- "Embrace" for The Lovers (1995) Gotham-BMG CD
- "Hush Now Sweet Child" for Jonathan Cohen (1995) Larrikin CD LRF373
- "Circle Dance" for Linda George (1996) Arid CD
- "Zoe" for Bob Venier (1996) Newmarket CD NEW20342
- "Anyone Who Had a Heart" for Joe Chindamo (1997) Walkabout/Larrikin LRF499
- "Blues Compilation" for ABC Jazz (1997)
- "Identify" for Mistaken Identity (1997) Newmarket CD NEW30042
- "Together" for Ted Vining Trio (1998) ABC Jazz 7243 496496 2 0
- "Black Orchid" for The Lovers (1998) Gotham/BMG
- "Sunday 8pm" for Faithless (1998) Festival
- "Adieu Miro" for Penny Dyer (1998) Newmarket Music
- "Songs for My Father" (1999) ABC Jazz
- "Sweet Life" for Renee Geyer (1999) Mushroom Records
- "Passion" Australian Art Orchestra with Paul Grabowski (2000) ABC records 465 230-2
- "From the Heart" for Alex Pertout (2001) Vorticity Music
- "Live on Stage: Love and the Blues" compilation (2003) ABC-MSI CD
- "Meditations on Love" for David Jones (2006) ABC classics CD 476 3163
- "Twilight" compilation for Michael Johnson Lyrebird Music
