= The Dugites =

Australian rock band

- Origin: Perth, Western Australia, Australia
- Genres: New wave
- Years active: 1978–1984
- Labels: Deluxe, Rough Diamond, Mercury, Half Baked/BMG
- Past members: see members list below

The Dugites were an Australian rock band who formed in the late 1970s and went on to record three albums in the early 1980s. The Dugites combined elements of power pop, new wave and electronic, producing songs with strong melodies, hooks and a smattering of politics. With hit singles "In Your Car", "Waiting" and "Juno and Me", they received extensive airplay, appearances on Countdown and toured nationally around Australia. The band's name refers to the brown venomous snake, the dugite, common to Western Australia.

== History ==
Peter Crosbie, originally from Melbourne, had spent time in the UK in the mid-70s and wrote an album's worth of material with Pete Sinfield, which was not released.

He returned to Australia, but to Perth rather than Melbourne. The Dugites formed in Perth in 1978 with a line-up of Lynda Nutter on vocals, Peter Crosbie on keyboards, Gunther Berghoffer on guitar, Phillip Bailey on bass and Clarence Bailey on drums. Nutter had been studying English and theatre at university in Perth but curtailed her studies for the sake of the band.

The group's sound was influenced by 1960s 'girl groups', Dusty Springfield and records produced by Phil Spector but their songs were often political. One early song, which did not make it to record, was called "Don't be Born Black in Australia"; "No-One Would Listen" and "South Pacific" had anti-nuclear themes.

In 1979 The Dugites released an independent single "Hit Single"/"Bruce", and most of the band toured as the backing band for Dave Warner. The single had been self-financed, but that year they were signed by the Deluxe label distributed by RCA Records. In 1980 Paul Noonan (ex-Dave Warner's from the Suburbs) replaced Phillip Bailey. Their first album The Dugites, produced by Bob Andrews (Graham Parker and the Rumour), was released in June 1980 and reached No. 22 on the Australian Album charts. It went on to attain gold status (35 000 copies sold). Three singles were issued from the album, "In Your Car"/"13 Again" in May 1980, which reached No. 34 on the Australian Singles charts in July, "Goodbye"/"No God, No Master" in July and "South Pacific"/"Gay Guys" in October, which reached No. 90. At the 1980 Countdown Music Awards both The Dugites and Nutter received nominations for 'Best New Talent' and 'Most Popular Female' respectively. In December the band were the opening act for Elton John's concert at the Perth Entertainment Centre.

The band's second album, West of the World also produced by Andrews, was released in July 1981. Once again, tracks covered political themes; "Part of Me" was (Crosbie said at the time) "about land rights and the problems Aboriginals face" and "After the Game" explored a post-nuclear holocaust existence. The album peaked at No. 33 on the Australian album charts and saw the release of two singles, "Waiting"/"Who Loves You More?", in May 1981, which reached No. 40 and "Part of Me"/"Never Touch" in September. In mid 1982 Berghoffer left the band and was replaced by guitarist Andrew Pendlebury (ex-The Sports), following which the band issued a single, "No Money"/"Decide" in July on the Rough Diamond label, and the related mini-album, No Money in August. Pendlebury was then replaced by Boris Falovic (aka Boris Garter; ex-Stockings) and Paul Williamson also joined on saxophone. By mid-1983 however the line-up was reduced to Nutter, Crosbie, Bailey and Noonan. In late 1983 Nutter (alongside Joe Camilleri) was working as backing vocalist for Stephen Cummings.

The Dugites signed to Mercury/PolyGram and released their third album, Cut The Talking, in April 1984. The album was recorded in Melbourne and the UK, with a British producer, Carey Taylor, and utilising notable British musicians such as saxophonist Mel Collins and the brass section from The Rumour. Three singles were released from the album, "Cut the Talking"/"Michael and Rodney", in November 1983, "Juno and Me"/"Everything Must Change" in April 1984, which reached No. 60 on the Australian Singles charts, and "It Ain't Like That"/"All That I Want" in August. Following the release of the album the band added Peter Kaldor on saxophone and John Crosbie on trombone and trumpet to the line-up for touring purposes, but at the end of 1984 the group disbanded.

In 1985 after several appearances on TV's Hey Hey It's Saturday, Bailey and Nutter stayed to live in Melbourne, where Bailey played drums in an Afro Reaggae Band called 'Randy and JahRoots' featuring Ghanaian star Randy Borquaye and drummer-congero Dezzy 'Animal' McKenna from Hey Hey It's Saturday.

== Members ==
- Lynda Nutter – vocals, percussion (1978–84)
- Gunther Berghofer – guitar, vocals (1978–83)
- Peter Crosbie – keyboards, vocals (1978–84)
- Clarence Bailey – drums, vocals (1978–84)
- Philip Bailey - bass vocals (1978–80)
- Paul Noonan – bass, vocals (1980–84)
- Andrew Pendlebury – guitar (1982–83)
- Boris Falovic - guitar (1983)
- Paul Williamson - saxophone (1983)

== Discography ==
=== Studio albums ===
List of albums, with Australian chart positions
Title	Album details	Peak chart positions
Title	Album details	AUS
The Dugites	Released: June 1980; Label: Deluxe (VPL1-6506)	22
West of the World	Released: July 1981; Label: Deluxe (VPL1-6576)	33
Cut The Talking	Released: April 1984; Label: Mercury (814 691-1)	45

=== Compilation albums ===
Title	Details
Hisstorical: The Best of the Dugites	Released:4 October 2004; Label: Half Baked/BMG
Live At Billboard 1981	Released: 2 May 2025; Label: Australian Road Crew Association

=== EPs ===
Title	Details
No Money	Released: August 1982; Label: Rough Diamond (RDS 3506)

=== Singles ===
List of singles, with Australian chart positions
Year	Title	Peak chart positions
Year	Title	AUS
1979	"Hit Single"/"Bruce"	-
1980	"In Your Car"/"13 Again"	34
1980	"Goodbye"/"No God, No Master"	-
1980	"South Pacific"/"Gay Guys"	90
1981	"Waiting"/"Who Loves You More"	40
1981	"Part of Me"/"Never Touch"	-
1982	"No Money"/"Decide"	-
1983	"Cut the Talking"/"Michael and Rodney"	47
1984	"Juno and Me"/"Everything Must Change"	60
1984	"It Ain't Like That"/"All That I Want"	-

== Awards and nominations ==
=== TV Week / Countdown Awards ===
Countdown was an Australian pop music TV series on national broadcaster ABC-TV from 1974 to 1987, and presented music awards from 1979 to 1987, initially in conjunction with magazine TV Week. The TV Week / Countdown Awards were a combination of popular-voted and peer-voted awards.

Year	Nominee / work	Award	Result
1980	Themselves	Best New Talent	Nominated
1980	Lynda Nutter (The Dugites)	Most Popular Female	Nominated
