= O.K, U.K! =

EP by The Sports
- Released: August 1979
- Recorded: 1979
- Studio: Stiff Mobile & Brittania Road Studios, London
- Genre: Pop rock
- Length: 11:55
- Label: Mushroom
- Producer: Dave Robinson, Liam Sternberg

The Sports chronology
Don't Throw Stones (1979)	O.K, U.K! (1979)	Suddenly (1980)

O.K, U.K! is an extended play (EP) by the Australian rock band The Sports. The EP was recorded in the United Kingdom in 1979, during the band's Graham Parker tour. Parker, who personally requested them as his support, and to do some recording at Stiff Records.

The EP was released in August 1979. According to the Kent Music Report, sales counted towards the single title, "Wedding Ring"; however, according to The Australian Music Database, the EP itself was named as charting. Either way, this 4-track recording peaked at number 40 on the Kent Music Report.

The EP has since been released on iTunes.

== Track listing ==
Side A
No.	Title	Writer(s)	Length
1.	"Wedding Ring"	Stevie Wright, George Young, Harry Vanda	2:34
2.	"Live, Work & Play"	Andrew Pendlebury, Stephen Cummings	3:03

Side B
No.	Title	Writer(s)	Length
1.	"Little Girl"	Martin Armiger, Cummings	3:52
2.	"Radio Show"	Armiger

=== Charts ===
Chart (1979)	Position
Australian Kent Music Report	40 (Note: O.K, U.K! appeared on the Australian Singles Chart. For some sources, (such as the Kent Music Report), the title was "Wedding Ring" other (such as The Australian Music Database) list the title as O.K, U.K!.)
