= Sweetheart's Dance =

Studio album by Pam Tillis
- Released: April 26, 1994
- Recorded: 1993-early 1994
- Studios: Treasure Isle Recorders, Sound Emporium Studios, Champagne Studios, The Money Pit, Imagine Studio, The Castle and Woodland Studios (Nashville, Tennessee)
- Genre: Country
- Length: 33:03
- Label: Arista
- Producers: Pam Tillis Steve Fishell

Pam Tillis chronology
Homeward Looking Angel (1992)	Sweetheart's Dance (1994)	All of This Love (1995)

Singles from Sweetheart's Dance
- 1. "Spilled Perfume" Released: March 26, 1994; 2. "When You Walk in the Room" Released: August 6, 1994; 3. "Mi Vida Loca (My Crazy Life)" Released: November 7, 1994; 4. "I Was Blown Away" Released: March 11, 1995; 5. "In Between Dances" Released: June 5, 1995

Professional ratings
Review scores
Source	Rating
Allmusic	4.5/5 stars

Sweetheart's Dance is the fourth studio album by American country music singer Pam Tillis, released on April 26, 1994, via Arista Records. It is her highest ranking album on the Billboard charts, at number 6.

This album produced five singles: "Spilled Perfume", "When You Walk in the Room" (a cover of a Jackie DeShannon song), "Mi Vida Loca (My Crazy Life)", "I Was Blown Away" and "In Between Dances". Respectively, these reached #5, #2, #1, #16, and #3 on the Billboard Hot Country Singles & Tracks (now Hot Country Songs) charts. "I Was Blown Away" was withdrawn from radio after the Oklahoma City bombing in 1995.

== Track listing ==
No.	Title	Writer(s)	Length
1.	"Mi Vida Loca (My Crazy Life)"	Pam Tillis, Jess Leary	2:51
2.	"Sweetheart's Dance"	Doug Gill	3:39
3.	"Calico Plains"	Matraca Berg, Michael Noble	3:47
4.	"When You Walk in the Room"	Jackie DeShannon	2:44
5.	"Spilled Perfume"	Tillis, Dean Dillon	3:53
6.	"I Was Blown Away"	Layng Martine Jr.	2:45
7.	"They Don't Break 'Em Like They Used To"	Roger Brown, Jason Sellers	2:57
8.	"In Between Dances"	Craig Bickhardt, Barry Alfonso	3:21
9.	"Better Off Blue"	Susan Longacre, Walt Aldridge	2:52
10.	"Til All the Lonely's Gone" (duet with Mel Tillis)	Tillis, Bob DiPiero, John Scott Sherrill	3:55

== Personnel ==
As listed in liner notes.

- Pam Tillis – vocals, backing vocals (1–3, 5, 6, 8, 9)
- John Barlow Jarvis – accordion (1), acoustic piano (2, 3, 9, 10)
- Steve Nathan – acoustic piano (4–8)
- Bobby Ogdin – synthesizers (5)
- Biff Watson – acoustic guitar
- Dan Dugmore – acoustic guitar (1, 9), electric guitar (3, 10)
- John Jorgenson – electric guitar (1, 3, 9), acoustic guitar solo (1), electric lead guitar (2, 10), mandolin (3)
- George Marinelli – electric guitar (4)
- Brent Mason – electric guitar (4–8)
- Bob DiPiero – 12-string guitar (4)
- Greg Leisz – steel guitar (1, 9), electric rhythm guitar (2), dobro (3, 10)
- Paul Franklin – steel guitar (4–8)
- Bill Monroe – mandolin (10)
- Willie Weeks – bass (1–3, 9, 10)
- Mike Brignardello – bass (4–8)
- Milton Sledge – drums (1–3, 9, 10), percussion (9, 10)
- Lonnie Wilson – drums (4–8), percussion (4)
- Harry Stinson – percussion (1), backing vocals (2)
- Terry McMillan – percussion (5), harmonica (6)
- Sam Bush – fiddle (2, 10)
- Rob Hajacos – fiddle (4–8)
- Suzi Ragsdale – backing vocals (1, 6)
- Mary Chapin Carpenter – backing vocals (4)
- Kim Richey – backing vocals (4)
- Mary Ann Kennedy - backing vocals (5)
- Vince Gill – backing vocals (7)
- Ashley Cleveland – backing vocals (9)
- Vicki Hampton – backing vocals (9)
- Liana Manis – backing vocals (9)
- Carrie Tillis – backing vocals (10)
- Cindy Tillis Westmoreland – backing vocals (10)
- Connie Tillis Howden – backing vocals (10)
- Mel Tillis Jr. – backing vocals (10)

=== Production ===
- Steve Fishell – producer
- Pam Tillis – producer
- Mike Poole – recording
- Chuck Ainlay – mixing
- Graham Lewis – additional recording, mix assistant
- Tony Collins – recording assistant
- Eric Elwell – recording assistant
- Steve Hennig – recording assistant
- Mike Janas – recording assistant
- Ed Simonton – recording assistant
- Mark Frigo – second mix assistant
- John Kliner – second mix assistant
- Don Cobb – digital editing
- Carlos Grier – digital editing
- Denny Purcell – mastering at Georgetown Masters (Nashville, Tennessee)
- Maude Gilman – art direction, design
- Peter Nash – photography
- Trish Townsend – styling
- Ina Vistica – make-up
- Kim Hunter – hair stylist
- Mike Robertson – management

== Charts ==
=== Weekly charts ===
Chart (1994)	Peak position
US Billboard 200	51
US Top Country Albums (Billboard)	6

=== Year-end charts ===
Chart (1994)	Position
US Top Country Albums (Billboard)	58
Chart (1995)	Position
US Top Country Albums (Billboard)	32

== Certifications ==
Region	Certification	Certified units/sales
Canada (Music Canada)	Platinum	100,000^{^}
United States (RIAA)	Platinum	1,000,000^{^}
^{^} Shipments figures based on certification alone.
