= Women (Make You Feel Alright) =

- US single cover

Single by The Easybeats

from the album It's 2 Easy
- B-side: "In My Book"
- Released: 13 January 1966 [Australia] April 1966 [USA]
- Genre: Power pop; Australian rock
- Length: 2:34
- Label: Parlophone/Albert Productions
- Songwriter(s): Stevie Wright/George Young
- Producer(s): Ted Albert

Australian singles chronology
"Sad and Lonely and Blue" (1965)	"Women (Make You Feel Alright)" (1966)	"Come and See Her" (1966)

U.S. singles chronology
"Make You Feel Alright (Women)" (1966)	"Friday on My Mind" (1966)

"Women (Make You Feel Alright)" is a song written by Stevie Wright and George Young. It was originally recorded by the Australian rock group the Easybeats in 1966, whose version reached #4 on the Australian charts. It was the group's debut single in the United States, released on the United Artists Records subsidiary label, Ascot Records under the title "Make You Feel Alright (Women)".

== Single track listing ==
1. Women (Make You Feel Alright)
2. In My Book

== Charts ==
Chart	Peak position
Kent Music Report	4
