= Stephanie Winslow =

American country singer

- Born: Stephanie Winslow; August 27, 1956 (age 70)
- Origin: Yankton, South Dakota, US
- Genre: Country
- Occupation: Singer
- Years active: 1979 — 1984
- Labels: Warner Bros./Curb, Primero/Curb, Oak, Curb/MCA

Stephanie Winslow (born August 27, 1956 in Yankton, South Dakota) is an American country artist. In the late 70s and 80s, she had a series of hit singles on the Billboard country music chart.

== Career ==
In the late 1970s and early 1980s, Winslow recorded for Warner Bros. Records. Briefly married to her record producer, Ray Ruff, in 1979 she had her biggest hit single with "Say You Love Me," a cover of a Fleetwood Mac single from 1976 which reached #10 on the Billboard country chart in late 1979. In 1980 her cover version of Roy Orbison's "Crying," became Winslow's second major hit single, peaking at #14." She had two singles released on the Oak label in 1983, they were "Nobody Else For Me" bw "Another Night" and "A: Kiss Me Darling" by "Another Night". She had a series of minor hits on the Billboard country chart under Warner Bros., and eventually signed with MCA Records. Her final single with the label, in 1984, was a cover of "Baby, Come to Me."

== Discography ==
=== Studio albums ===
Year	Album details	US Country
1980	Crying: Released: 1980; Label: Warner Bros./Curb	16
1981	Dakota: Released: 1981; Label: Warner Bros./Curb	45

=== Singles ===
Year	Single	Chart Positions		Album
Year	Single	US Country	CAN Country	Album
1979	"Say You Love Me"	10	—	Crying
1980	"Crying"	14	53	Crying
1980	"I Can't Remember"	38	—	Crying
1980	"Try It On"	36	—	Dakota
1980	"Baby, I'm a Want You"	35	—	Dakota
1980	"Anything But Yes Is Still a No"	25	—	Dakota
1981	"Hideaway Healing"	36	—	Dakota
1981	"I've Been a Fool"	39	—	Dakota
1981	"Sometimes When We Touch"	flip	—	Dakota
1981	"When You Walk in the Room"	29	—	Single only
1982	"Slippin' and Slidin'"	43	—	Single only
1982	"Don't We Belong in Love"	40	—	Single only
1982	"In Between Lovers"	69	—	Single only
1983	"Nobody Else for Me"	61	—	Single only
1983	"Kiss Me Darling"	25	—	Single only
1984	"Dancin' with the Devil"	29	—	Single only
1984	"Baby, Come to Me"	42	—	Single only
"—" denotes releases that did not chart
