= It's Lonely Out There =

Single by Pam Tillis

from the album All of This Love
- B-side: "You Can't Have a Good Time Without Me"
- Released: May 1996
- Studio: Sound Emporium (Nashville, Tennessee)
- Genre: Country
- Length: 3:23
- Label: Arista Nashville
- Songwriters: Bob DiPiero; Pam Tillis
- Producers: Pam Tillis; Mike Poole

Pam Tillis singles chronology
"The River and the Highway" (1996)	"It's Lonely Out There" (1996)	"Betty's Got a Bass Boat" (1996)

"It's Lonely Out There" is a song co-written and recorded by American country music artist Pam Tillis. It was released in May 1996 as the third single from her album All of This Love. The song reached number 14 on the Billboard Hot Country Singles & Tracks chart in September 1996. Tillis wrote the song with her then-husband, Bob DiPiero.

== Content ==
The song's lyrical focus is a woman conversing with an ex-lover of hers, "taunting" him by telling him to find another lover but warning him that "it's lonely out there".

== Background ==
The song is composed in the key of A-flat major with a main chord pattern of A♭-E♭-D♭9-E♭ on the verses, and A♭-E♭-Fm-D♭9-A♭-E♭-A♭ on the chorus. Tillis presented the idea to her then-husband Bob DiPiero, who helped her compose it on a classical guitar that was gifted to him by Neil Diamond. According to Tillis, DiPiero had "pretty much written it" when she took a nap, and then when she woke up with the song "I Can See Clearly Now" in her head, the two decided to give the song a similar sound.

== Chart performance ==
Chart (1996)	Peak position
Canada Country Singles (RPM)	21
US Hot Country Songs (Billboard)	14
