= Doug de Vries =

Doug de Vries (born 26 July 1960) is an Australian guitarist working in Melbourne, Victoria. He studied jazz guitar with Bruce Clarke and classical guitar under Jochen Schubert and began playing professionally at the age of 18. He undertook a degree in Music at La Trobe University between 1983 and 1987 joining the Australian Jazz Orchestra a year later.

de Vries performs in a variety of styles including jazz, choro, tango and bossa nova and is Australia's leading exponent of the Brazilian guitar repertoire. He has recorded numerous albums of original works and classic Brazilian repertoire, along with performers including Australian artists Vince Jones, James Morrison, Paul Grabowsky, Don Burrows, Kate Ceberano, and Judy Jacques, as well as international artists Yamandu Costa, Luciana Rabello, Jorginho do Pandeiro, Hermeto Pascoal, Mauricio Carrilho, Nailor Proveta and Lula Galvao. He worked with Paul Grabowsky on the Channel 7 program 'Tonight Live with Steve Vizard' over three years in the 1990s. In July 1991 he won the Australian Jazz & Blues Award for "Australia's Best Jazz Guitarist".

He established the Brazilian music course as part of the Bachelor of Australian Popular Music Degree at NMIT and teaches at Monash University, in the Sir Zelman Cowen School of Music, and the Melbourne Conservatorium of Music at the University of Melbourne.

He has performed on soundtracks for the films The Sapphires (2012), Red Dog (2011), and Under the Lighthouse Dancing (1997). Other projects include producing the "It's About Time" album tour for Christine Sullivan, orchestrating film scores for The Last Days of Chez Nous, Lucky Break and Mushroom; forming the New Tango Quintet playing original contemporary compositions, writing the commissioned New Metamorphoses for the Melbourne Symphony Orchestra for the August 1996 "Metropolis Series" and performing as the Melbourne Samba School's lead player on the cavaquinho.

== Discography ==
- Doug de Vries (1990)
- Karate (with Andrew Pendlebury) (1993)
- Trouble and Desire (Doug De Vries & Andrew Pendlebury) (1995)
- A Knot in the Wood (featuring Diana Clark) (2002)
- Free Range (2002)
- Lantana Lovers (2004)
- Jacaranda (2007)
- Diana Clark Trio with Doug de Vries & Steve Grant (2009)
- DDV Solo (2010)
- Odeon Doug de Vries & Ken Murray (with Jaimie Smith) (2011)
- Three Shadows of Blue (wirth Diana Clark) (2012)
- Sexteto Zona Sul (Melb Choro sextet) (2013)
- 8 Com (Nocturnes & Lullabies) (2014)
