= Martin Armiger =

Australian musician (1949–2019)

- Armiger at his Minton House studio in Kings Cross in the 1990s

Background information
- Born: John Martin Armiger; 10 June 1949; Hitchin, Hertfordshire, England
- Origin: Adelaide, South Australia
- Died: 27 November 2019 (aged 70) France
- Genres: Rock and roll, pop
- Occupations: Singer-songwriter; guitarist; record producer; composer
- Instrument: Guitar
- Years active: 1970–2019
- Labels: Mushroom, White, Powderworks/RCA, ABC, Regular, Normal/Citadel, WEA
- Formerly of: High Rise Bombers, The Bleeding Hearts, The Sports, Stephen Cummings Band
- Spouse: Maureen O'Shaughnessy
- Website: Martin Armiger

John Martin Armiger (10 June 1949 – 27 November 2019) was an English-born Australian musician, record producer and composer. He was one of the singer-songwriters and guitarists with Melbourne-based rock band the Sports from August 1978 to late 1981, which had Top 30 hits on the Kent Music Report Singles Chart with, "Don't Throw Stones" (1979), "Strangers on a Train" (1980) and "How Come" (1981); and Top 20 albums with Don't Throw Stones (No. 9, 1979), Suddenly (No. 13, 1980) and Sondra (1981).

Armiger was musical director for Australian Broadcasting Corporation (ABC) TV 1984 series Sweet and Sour and was record producer on the related soundtrack album as well as performing and songwriting. In 1986 he produced and composed for another ABC TV soundtrack for the miniseries Dancing Daze. At the Australian Film Institute Awards of 1986 he shared an accolade for Best Original Music Score with William Motzing for their work on Young Einstein (publicly released 1988). Armiger notably co-produced "Dumb Things" for Paul Kelly and the Coloured Girls, with Kelly, on the Young Einstein soundtrack. It was later released as the fourth single from the band's second album, Under the Sun on Mushroom Records imprint White Label Records in January 1989, peaking at No. 36 on the Australian Recording Industry Association (ARIA) Singles Chart. In the US the track was released under the band name Paul Kelly and the Messengers, reaching No. 16 on the Billboard Modern Rock chart. "Dumb Things" was also in the 1989 film Look Who's Talking Too.

In 1995 Armiger's work for the TV series Cody (1994–95) won the Australasian Performing Right Association Award for Most Performed Television Theme. Armiger was Head of Screen Composition at the Australian Film Television and Radio School (AFTRS). In 2006 his portrait by John R. Walker was a finalist for the Archibald Prize.

== Early years ==
John Martin Armiger was born on 10 June 1949 in Hitchin, Hertfordshire. His father, John Armiger, played double bass, piano and sang in local bands; his mother also played piano and sang. At the age of eight he gave up on his violin lessons, turned away from his mother's taste in classical music and his father's favourites of Peggy Lee and Perry Como – he had discovered Buddy Holly's "Brown Eyed Handsome Man". The family migrated to Australia in 1965 and lived in Elizabeth, South Australia. Armiger studied at Flinders University in Adelaide where he completed his Bachelor of Arts (Honours) course in 1974. His younger brothers, Keith, Andrew, and Michael Armiger, are also musicians and have been members of The Immigrants (1978–1980) in Elizabeth, 10000 Guitars (1985–1987) in Melbourne, and Armiger Brothers in Sydney, as well as having separate musical careers. Their youngest brother, Chris Armiger (born 1965), joined the Armiger Brothers, which has recorded with Martin, who also produced their material.

By the early 1970s Armiger had decided on a career in music, he began practising to improve his guitar skills. During 1972, as a student, he was a composer for a short film, Drac. It was directed by David Stocker as a 1973 Masters Student Film for the Australian Film Television and Radio School (AFTRS). In 1975 Armiger moved to Melbourne and started with local bands. He soon joined The Toads on lead guitar and backing vocals with Andrew Bell on bass guitar; Randy Bulpin on lead guitar; Jane Clifton on lead vocals; Eric Gradman on violin; Jenny Keath on backing vocals; Buzz Leeson, and Eddie van Rosendaal on drums. Also in 1975 Armiger composed music for A Night in Rio, a stage musical at Melbourne's Pram Factory. He co-composed music for Pure Shit (aka Pure S) with Red Symons (a member of Skyhooks), a feature film directed by Bert Deling. Armiger wrote the title track and theme, and, as a member of Toads, performed on the soundtrack.

In 1976 he was a founding member of pub rockers, The Bleeding Hearts, on guitar and lead vocals. Other members were Gradman on violin and vocals; Rick Grossman on bass guitar; Keith Shadwick on saxophone and backing vocals; Huk Treloar on drums; Laurie Tunnicliffe on bass guitar; Geoff Warner and Chris Worrall on guitar. The band appeared at local venues, including The Kingston Hotel, and The Tiger Lounge (Hotel), where Armiger played a white Fender Stratocaster. In August 1977 the group broke up but left enough material for a posthumous album, What Happened!, which appeared in the following year on Missing Link Records.

In 1977 he briefly joined Flying Tackle and was then a member of The High Rise Bombers, another pub-rock group, from 1977 to 1978. The line-up included Armiger (guitar, vocals, songwriter), Lee Cass (bass guitar), Chris Dyson (guitar), Sally Ford (saxophone, songwriter; ex-Flying Tackle), Paul Kelly (vocals, guitar, songwriter), John Lloyd (drums) and Shadwick (saxophone). Dyson was replaced by Chris Langman (guitar, vocals) in early 1978. [Chris Langman never joined The High Rise Bombers or recorded with them.] In August the group dissolved as Armiger left for The Sports, Ford left for the Kevins, and Kelly formed The Dots first, then later Paul Kelly and The Dots with Langman and Lloyd. High Rise Bombers had recorded two tracks "She's Got It" and "Domestic Criminal" which eventually appeared on the 1981 compilation album, The Melbourne Club, by various artists on Missing Link Records. "Domestic Criminal" was written by Armiger.

== The Sports ==
The Sports had formed in Melbourne in 1976 and included Stephen Cummings on vocals, Ed Bates on guitar, Robert Glover on bass guitar, Paul Hitchins on drums and Jim Niven on piano. Andrew Pendlebury joined on guitar in August 1977, and in August the following year Bates was replaced by Armiger. According to music journalist Ian McFarlane, Cummings had ousted Bates in favour of Armiger who had a "more commercial outlook". Luis Feliu of The Canberra Times described Bates: "[he] shows an authentic feel for the early strains of rock and roll", whereas Armiger "brings with him a more electric sound".

The Sports had chart success in the late 1970s and early 1980s with Top 30 hits on the Kent Music Report Singles Chart with "Don't Throw Stones" (1979), "Strangers on a Train" (1980) and "How Come" (1981); and Top 20 albums with, Don't Throw Stones (No. 9, 1979), Suddenly (No. 13, 1980) and Sondra (1981). For the Don't Throw Stones album Feliu noted that Armiger "has now established himself as a dominating sound and songwriter with the band", specifically his "songs sees the Sports getting into a sort of heavier, Skyhooks type approach". "Strangers on a Train" was written by Armiger. He also co-wrote album tracks with Cummings.

In October 2010, Don't Throw Stones, was listed in the book 100 Best Australian Albums. The authors, John O'Donnell, Toby Creswell and Craig Mathieson, described how Armiger had affected the group's sound, saying that "it is immediately clear the extra dimension his presence brings to the band – his songs – and harmony vocals greatly increase [the group's] soul pop quotient".

Armiger praised Suddenly, Feliu quoted him "[it's] still quite smooth, but it's less slick. There are a few groove songs, a couple almost reggaeish. When we did Don't Throw Stones we were just getting into things like reggae. This time it was much easier to play things like that". He described working with Cameron Allan, their producer on Sondra, to Susan Moore of The Australian Women's Weekly: "we knew we could badger him to get what we wanted, if need be. We had more time to get the sound we wanted". The Sports broke up late in 1981 and Cummings went on to a solo career, while Armiger turned to record producing and session work.

== Record producer and music composer ==
While a member of the Sports, Armiger produced "Beatnik Twist" as a single for Johnny Topper in 1979. As a session musician, by November 1980, he supplied lead guitar for Marc Hunter's solo album, Big City Talk. In 1981 he produced three tracks, "Promise not to Tell", "Lowdown" and "Want You Back", on former High Rise Bombers bandmates, Paul Kelly and the Dots' debut album, Talk, released on Mushroom Records in March. The other tracks were produced by Joe Camilleri, except one track produced by Trevor Lucas. After The Sports had disbanded, in August 1982 Armiger produced an extended play, Club of Rome, and a single, "Ululation (Here It Comes Again)" (September 1983), for The Kevins which included Sally Ford, another former bandmate. In the early 1980s, Armiger moved to New South Wales, he continued to produce records, and expanded his composition and performance of music for films and TV.

From 2 July 1984 the Australian Broadcasting Corporation (ABC) broadcast a 20-episode, weekly pop music, drama TV series, Sweet and Sour. Armiger was musical director for the series and provided backing vocals, lead guitar, bass guitar, keyboards, drums and lyrics. He also produced the two soundtrack albums, Sweet & Sour – TV Soundtrack and Sweet & Sour Volume Two, and three singles, "Sweet and Sour" (which peaked at No. 13 on the Kent Music Report Singles Chart), "Glam to Wham" and "No Focus". Also in that year he joined Stephen Cummings Band on guitar and vocals; and in August he produced Cummings' debut solo album, Senso, released on Regular Records, with the related single, "Gymnasium", which peaked at No. 27. Neil Lade of The Canberra Times described the single "[it's] quite a dismal and derivative little number that easily falls into the category of throw-away music" while the rest of the album's "overall feeling is of soft soul and a gentle mood prevails". In May 1985 Armiger won Producer of the Year at the annual Countdown Music and Video Awards of 1984.

During the mid-1980s Armiger composed the stage musical Illusion for the 1986 Adelaide Festival of the Arts and co-composed Manning Clark's History of Australia – The Musical which premiered at Melbourne's Princess Theatre in January 1988. He produced a studio cast album of Illusion and History of Australia's original cast recording.

In 1987 Armiger composed music for another ABC TV series, Stringer, and in April 1988, he produced a related album, You've Always Got the Blues, released by its singers, Kate Ceberano and Wendy Matthews, which included his song writing effort, "Stringer". The album reached No. 4 on the national chart. Armiger composed the score, with William Motzing, for Young Einstein (December 1988), a film by Yahoo Serious. They had won the Australian Film Institute Award of 1986 for Best Original Music Score for their work. (Note: The award win was shared with fellow composer William Motzing. They won their award in 1986 for the unreleased version of Young Einstein. The film appeared in Australian cinemas in December 1988. Serious had delayed its release due to dissatisfaction with the earlier version of the film, and a legal dispute with the original distribution company.)

Armiger was composer for Come In Spinner, an ABC TV series in 1989, and produced the soundtrack of the same title in 1990, by Vince Jones and Grace Knight, which peaked at No. 4 on the ARIA Album Charts. Armiger provided the inspiration for the Screen Music Awards established by the Australian Guild of Screen Composers (AGSC) in 1992. He was subsequently AGSC president for seven years. In 1993 he produced Seven Deadly Sins, another soundtrack, for the ABC TV drama series of the same name. His former bandmate, Kelly, provided vocals on the soundtrack together with Vika Bull, Deborah Conway, and Renée Geyer. The album provided a single, "He Can't Decide". Armiger co-wrote various tracks, "He Can't Decide", "Imagine the World" and "Maybe This Time" (all with Kelly), and "Don't Break It I Say" (with Kelly, Conway and Geyer).

In 1989, Armiger was called as an expert witness along with Derek Williams and Dr G.B. Hair in the Federal Court of Australia in support of a copyright infringement case brought by Guy Gross against CBS Records Australia Limited and Collette Roberts, with the court ruling in the defendants' favour.

From 1988, Armiger also regularly hired Derek Williams as arranger, orchestrator, conductor, session musician and associate composer for numerous albums, tv-series and films, with shared credits including Manning Clark's History of Australia – The Musical, The Last Resort (1988 TV series), Bodysurfer (miniseries), The Rainbow Warrior Conspiracy, The Crossing (1990 film), The Wonderful World of Dogs, Ring of Scorpio, Come in Spinner (miniseries), Children of the Dragon, The Other Side of Paradise, Police Rescue, Seven Deadly Sins (miniseries), Thank God He Met Lizzie, Hard Knox and Hildegarde.

Armiger wrote the theme of Cody (1994–95), a six-part TV drama series for Seven Network. At the APRA Awards of 1995 he won Most Performed Television Theme for his composition. The Sports reformed for the Mushroom 25 Live anniversary concert on 14 November 1998, at the Melbourne Cricket Ground (MCG), but Armiger was unable to perform due to a previously broken leg turning gangrenous. For the gig the group used Ashley Naylor of Even on guitar. During September 2000 Armiger was hospitalised by an infection, in the following January he recalled his experience in an article, "Waiting for Life and Death'", for The Sydney Morning Herald.

As of 2004 Armiger was Head of Screen Composition at the Australian Film Television and Radio School (AFTRS). At AFTRS he coordinated and taught the Graduate Diploma in Screen Composition as a specialist course for selected students. He composed the news theme for the ABC which has been in use on ABC1 since early 2005. In 2006 Flinders University recognised his contributions to the music industry as a recipient of their Distinguished Alumni Awards. Also that year his portrait, by John R Walker, was a finalist at the Archibald Prize.

In October 2009, Armiger was again called as an expert witness for a Federal Court hearing on a plagiarism claim against Colin Hay and Ron Strykert as writers of the 1981 Men at Work hit single "Down Under", which peaked at No. 1 in Australia, United Kingdom, and United States. The flute riff was claimed to be from "Kookaburra Sits in the Old Gum Tree". Armiger stated that the riff had the same melody as "Kookaburra" but gave a different impression in "Down Under" and that it was debatable whether it was the song's hook.

== Final years and death ==
After retiring from his role as Head of Screen Composition at AFTRS, Armiger moved to Arnac-Pompadour, France in late 2017 with his wife, actor and writer Maureen O'Shaughnessy, where they created 'Maison Lyre' as a retreat designed to provide intensive creative opportunities for artists working in music and literature. Armiger remained in France until his death on 27 November 2019.

== Bibliography ==
- Armiger, Martin (October 1995). "Crazier Than the Average Band". The Independent Monthly. 7 (4): 77.
- The Waiters. Melbourne: Text Publishing. 2000. ISBN 978-1-876485-57-3.
- "Waiting for Life and Death". The Sydney Morning Herald. 13 January 2001.
- "Pool of echoes". Meanjin. 65 (3). Melbourne: 66–73. 2006. ISSN 0025-6293. "Screen composer Martin Armiger recalls his musical past and his musical influences. Paper in: On Rock 'n' Roll"

== Discography ==
The High Rise Bombers

- "She's Got It", "Domestic Criminal" on The Melbourne Club – various artists (1981, Missing Link Records)

=== Record producer ===
Armiger credited as producer or co-producer:

- "Beatnick Twist" – Johnny Topper (1979)
- Talk – Paul Kelly & the Dots (1981, Mushroom Records)
- Club of Rome (mini-LP) – The Kevins (1982, White Label Records)
  - "Ululation (Here It Comes Again)" (1983)
- D-D-Dance – The Allniters (1983, Powderworks/RCA)
- Sweet & Sour – TV Soundtrack by Takeaways & Various Artists (soundtrack) – various artists (1984, ABC Records)
  - "Sweet & Sour", "Glam to Wham" (1984)
- Senso – Stephen Cummings (1984, Regular Records)
- Sweet & Sour Volume Two (soundtrack) – various artists (1984, ABC)
  - "No Focus" (1984)
- "Phantom Shuffle" – Austen Tayshus (1984, Regular)
- Deckchairs Overboard – Deckchairs Overboard (1985, Regular)
- Distance – Benders (1985)
- Illusion (soundtrack) – various artists (1986)
- "Dumb Things" – Paul Kelly (1988, Mushroom/White)
- Trouble from Providence – Sacred Cowboys (1988, Normal Records/Citadel Records)
- You've Always Got the Blues (soundtrack for Stringer) – Kate Ceberano & Wendy Matthews (1988, ABC)
- Young Einstein (soundtrack) – various artists (1988)
- The Crossing (soundtrack) – various artists (1990)
- Come In Spinner (soundtrack) – Vince Jones & Grace Knight (1990, ABC)
- Thursday's Fortune – Club Hoy (1991)
- Get Happy – Teen Queens (1992)
- Wide Skies – Gondwanaland (1992, WEA)
- Seven Deadly Sins (soundtrack) – various artists (1993, ABC)
- Bravado – Penny Flanagan (1994)
- Seven Flights Up – Penny Flanagan (1996)

== Filmography ==
Armiger credited as music composer or co-composer:

- Drac – (1972)
- Pure Shit (aka Pure S) – (1976)
- Belau – (1983)
- White Man's Legend – (1984)
- Displaced Persons – (1984)
- Sweet and Sour – (1984)
- The Empty Beach – (1985)
- Dancing Daze – (1986)
- Cyclone Tracy – (1986)
- Two Friends – (1986)
- I Own the Racecourse – (1986)
- The Challenge – (1986)
- I've Come About the Suicide – (1987)
- Perhaps Love – (1987)
- Relative Merits – (1987)
- The Lizard King – (1988)
- Cane Toads – (1988)
- Police Rescue (1988)
- Young Einstein – (1988)
- Stringer – (1988)
- The Last Resort – (1988)
- Sweetie – (1989)
- The Rainbow Warrior Conspiracy – (1989)
- Body Surfer – (1989)
- The Crossing – (1990)
- Ring of Scorpio – (1990)
- Wonderful World of Dogs – (1990)
- Come In Spinner – (1990)
- Waiting – (1991)
- Flowers and the Wide Sea – (1991)
- Children of the Dragon – (1992)
- The Fremantle Conspiracy – (1992)
- The Other Side of Paradise – (1993)
- Nice Guys Finish Last – (1993)
- Seven Deadly Sins ("Greed", "Envy" episodes) – (1993)
- Pram Factory – (1994)
- Cody – (1994–1996)
  - Cody: Bad Love, Cody: The Tipoff , Cody: The Wrong Stuff, Cody: The Burn Out, Cody: Fall from Grace
- Party Girls – (1995)
- Where Angels Fear to Tread – (1996)
- Wild Ones – (1997)
- Thank God He Met Lizzie aka The Wedding Party – (1997)
- The Great Stumble Forward – (1998)
- Ketchup – (1998)
- Two Girls & a Baby (1998)
- David Carradine's Martial Arts Adventure – (1999)
- House Gang – (1999)
- Fetch – (1999)
- Powderburn – (1999)
- Hard Knox – (2001)
- The Secret Life of Us – (2001)
- Hildegarde aka Hildegarde: A Duck Down Under – (2001)
- Marking Time – (2003)
- The Surgeon – (2006)
- Clubland aka Introducing the Dwights – (2007)

== Awards ==
Australasian Performing Right Association Awards
Australasian Performing Right Association (APRA) recognises excellence by composers and songwriters with the APRA Awards presented annually since 1982.

Year	Nominee / work	Award	Result
1995	Cody	Most Performed Television Theme	Won
1995	Flowers and the Wide Sea	Most Performed Television Theme	Nominated

APRA-AGSC Screen Music Awards
These awards are presented annually since 2002 by APRA in conjunction with Australian Guild of Screen Composers (AGSC) for television and films scores and soundtracks. Separate AGSC Awards were inaugurated in 1992 upon the inspiration of Armiger.

Year	Nominee / work	Award	Result
2004	Marking Time	Best Music for a Mini-Series or Telemovie	Nominated

Australian Film Institute Awards
Australian Film Institute (AFI) recognises excellence in film work with the Australian Film Institute Awards (AFI Awards) presented annually since 1958.

Year	Nominee / work	Award	Result
1986	Young Einstein	Best Original Music Score	Won

Australian Recording Industry Association Awards
Australian Recording Industry Association (ARIA) recognises excellence in recorded musical work with the ARIA Music Awards (ARIAs) presented annually since 1987.

Year	Nominee / work	Award	Result
1987	Dancing Daze	Best Original Soundtrack / Cast / Show Recording	Nominated
1987	Illusion	Best Original Soundtrack / Cast / Show Recording	Nominated
1989	You've Always Got The Blues	Best Original Soundtrack / Cast / Show Recording	Won
1991	Come In Spinner	Best Original Soundtrack / Cast / Show Recording	Nominated
1995	Fornicon	Best Original Soundtrack / Cast / Show Recording	Nominated

Countdown Awards
Countdown was an Australian pop music TV series on national broadcaster ABC-TV from 1974 to 1987, it presented music awards from 1979 to 1987, initially in conjunction with magazine TV Week but then independently. The Countdown Music and Video Awards were succeeded by the ARIA Awards.

Year	Nominee / work	Award	Result
1984	Martin Armiger	Best Producer	Won
