= Nailor Azevedo =

Brazilian clarinetist and saxophonist

Nailor Azevedo (also known as Nailor Proveta) is a Brazilian clarinetist and saxophonist. Azevedo is a member of Banda Mantiqueira, which was nominated for a Grammy in 1998. He has performed with Benny Carter and Anita O'Day. He plays Brazilian choro and samba as well as traditional jazz.
