= The Sports Play Dylan (and Donovan) =

EP by The Sports
- Released: November 1981
- Recorded: 1981
- Studios: AAV Studios, Melbourne
- Genre: Pop rock
- Label: Mushroom
- Producers: James "Jimbo" Barton, The Sports

The Sports chronology
Sondra (1981)	The Sports Play Dylan (and Donovan) (1981)	All Sports (1982)

Singles from The Sports Play Dylan (and Donovan)
- 1. "Sunshine Superman" Released: November 1981

The Sports Play Dylan (and Donovan) is an extended play (EP) by Australian rock band The Sports. The EP is five covers of Bob Dylan and Donovan tracks. It was released in November 1981 and peaked at number 70 on the Kent Music Report.

== Track listing ==
Side A
No.	Title	Writer(s)	Length
1.	"Sunshine Superman"	Donovan	3:11
2.	"Ballad of a Thin Man"	Bob Dylan	4:45

Side B
No.	Title	Writer(s)	Length
1.	"You're a Big Girl Now"	Dylan	4:06
2.	"Fourth Time Around"	Dylan	2:56
3.	"All the Tired Horses"	Dylan	2:00

== Charts ==
Chart (1981)	Position
Australian Kent Music Report	70
