= Sunshine Superman (song) =

1966 single by Donovan

Single by Donovan

from the album Sunshine Superman
- B-side: "The Trip"
- Released: 1 July 1966
- Recorded: 19 December 1965
- Studio: EMI, London
- Genre: Psychedelic pop; folk rock; psychedelic folk; psychedelic rock
- Length: 3:15 (single/album version); 4:34 (full-length version)
- Label: Epic
- Songwriter: Donovan
- Producer: Mickie Most

Donovan singles chronology
"Remember the Alamo" (1966)	"Sunshine Superman" (1966)	"Mellow Yellow" (1967)

"Sunshine Superman" is a song written and recorded by Scottish singer-songwriter Donovan. It was released as a single in the United States through Epic Records (Epic 5–10045) in July 1966, but due to a contractual dispute the United Kingdom release was delayed until December 1966, where it appeared on Donovan's previous label, Pye Records (Pye 7N 17241). The single was backed with "The Trip" on both the US and UK releases. It has been described as "[one of the] classics of the era", and as "the quintessential bright summer sing along".

"Sunshine Superman" reached the top of the Billboard Hot 100 in the United States (Donovan's only single to do so) and subsequently became the title track of his third album. When finally released in the UK, it reached No. 2. A different mix of "The Trip" (without harmonica) is also included in the album. The single version of "Sunshine Superman" was edited down from its original four-and-a-half minutes to just over three, and this version was also used on the album; the full-length version made its debut on the Donovan's Greatest Hits LP in 1969.

== Musical style ==
Recorded on 19 December 1965, the song "has a claim to be the first psychedelic rock record ever recorded" according to The Guardian. It was arranged by two jazz musicians, pianist John Cameron and Spike Heatley, who played double bass. John Paul Jones, who would also act as an arranger on some Donovan sessions for producer Mickie Most, played electric bass. Session guitarist Jimmy Page (The Yardbirds, Led Zeppelin) played lead guitar, employing an innovative use of the volume control on his guitar for the repeating figure he played during the verses. Cameron played a two-tier Morley harpsichord on the record. After the success of the song, Cameron would arrange (and play on) many tracks for Donovan and Most.

== Release and reception ==
"Sunshine Superman" was initially readied for release on Pye Records in the UK on 28 January 1966, originally backed by "Sunny South Kensington". After being delayed one week, Pye cancelled the release under the assertion that label could not release a Most production, as the producer was signed with EMI. In the US, where Clive Davis had signed Donovan with CBS Records, Most's involvement was unproblematic as the producer already had a contract with CBS. As such, "Sunshine Superman" got its first release as a single on 1 July 1966 in the US on Epic Records, this time with "The Trip" on the B-side. It wasn't until Donovan negotiated a new Pye contract that the label relented and released "Sunshine Superman" as a single in the UK on 2 December 1966.

Billboard described the single as a "rockin' production ballad with an exciting, commercial sound". Cashbox described the song as a "funky, medium-paced, blues-soaked romancer about a lad who is determined to snare the gal of his dreams", and called it "impressive". Record World said it "has an incessant and irresistible mid shuffle beat."

== In popular culture ==
Following the release of the hit song, the name "Sunshine Superman" became widely associated with Donovan himself, and was used as the title or part of the title of about six of his album releases and reissues (including several compilations and a live album as well as being used as the title track of his 1966 studio album).

== Personnel ==
- Donovan – vocals, acoustic guitar, tambura
- Jimmy Page and Eric Ford – electric guitars
- John Cameron – harpsichord and arrangement
- Spike Heatley – double bass
- Bobby Orr – drums
- Tony Carr – percussion
- John Paul Jones – bass
- Peter Vince – Abbey Road Engineer

== Chart performance ==
=== Weekly charts ===
Chart (1966–67)	Peak position
Australia (Go-Set Top 40)	2
Belgium (Ultratop 50 Flanders)	11
Canadian RPM Top Singles	2
France (SNEP)	9
Irish Singles Chart	4
Netherlands (Dutch Top 40)	5
Netherlands (Single Top 100)	2
New Zealand (Listener)	3
UK (Official Charts Company)	2
U.S. Billboard Hot 100	1
U.S. Cashbox Top 100	1
West Germany (GfK)	7

=== Year-end charts ===
Chart (1966)	Rank
UK	84
U.S. Billboard Hot 100	26
U.S. Cash Box	25

== The Sports version ==
"Sunshine Superman"

Single by the Sports

from the album The Sports Play Dylan (and Donovan)
- B-side: "Cargo Cult"
- Released: November 1981
- Studio: AAV Studios, Melbourne
- Genre: Pop rock
- Length: 3:11
- Label: Mushroom
- Songwriter: Donovan
- Producer: James "Jimbo" Barton

The Sports singles chronology
"When We Go Out Tonight" (1981)	"Sunshine Superman" (1981)	"Black Stockings (For Chelsea)" (1982)

Australian rock band The Sports released a version as the lead single from their extended play album, The Sports Play Dylan (and Donovan). The song peaked at number 22 on the Australian Kent Music Report.

=== Charts ===
Chart (1981)	Position
Australian Kent Music Report	22
