= Wedding Ring (song) =

1965 single by the Easybeats

- Australian record label

Single by The Easybeats

from the album It's 2 Easy
- B-side: "Me Or You"
- Released: 26 August 1965
- Recorded: June 1965
- Studio: Armstrong Studios, Melbourne
- Genre: Power pop; Australian rock
- Length: 2:03
- Label: Parlophone/Albert Productions
- Songwriters: Stevie Wright/George Young, Harry Vanda
- Producer: Ted Albert

The Easybeats Australian singles chronology
"She's So Fine" (1965)	"Wedding Ring" (1965)	"Sad and Lonely and Blue" (1965)

"Wedding Ring" is a song written by Stevie Wright and George Young. It was originally recorded by the Australian rock group the Easybeats in 1965, whose version reached #7 on the Australian charts.

== Single track listing ==
1. Wedding Ring
2. Me Or You

== Charts ==
Chart	Peak position
Australia Music Maker	6

== The Sports version ==
"Wedding Ring"

Single by The Sports

from the album O.K, U.K!
- Released: August 1979
- Studio: Stiff Mobile & Brittania Road Studios, London
- Genre: Pop rock
- Length: 2:43
- Label: Mushroom
- Songwriters: Stevie Wright/George Young, Harry Vanda
- Producers: Dave Robinson, Liam Sternberg

The Sports singles chronology
"Suspicious Minds" (1979)	"Wedding Ring" (1979)	"Strangers on a Train" (1980)

Australia rock band The Sports released a version as the lead single from their extended play album, O.K, U.K!. The song peaked at number 40 on the Australian Kent Music Report.

=== Charts ===
Chart (1979)	Position
Australian Kent Music Report	40
