= When You Walk in the Room =

1963 single by Jackie DeShannon

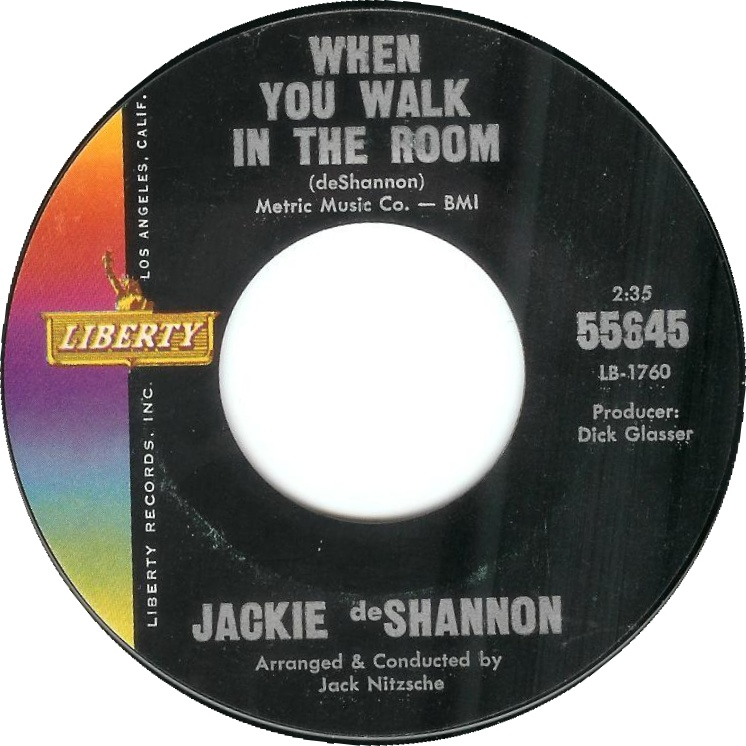

Single by Jackie DeShannon
- A-side: "Till You Say You'll Be Mine"
- Released: November 23, 1963
- Recorded: 1963
- Genre: Pop
- Length: 2:35
- Label: Liberty
- Songwriter: Jackie DeShannon
- Producer: Dick Glasser

Jackie DeShannon singles chronology
"Little Yellow Roses" (1963)	"Till You Say You'll Be Mine" / "When You Walk in the Room" (1963)	"Oh Boy" (1964)

"When You Walk in the Room" is a song written and recorded by American singer-songwriter Jackie DeShannon. It was initially released as a single on November 23, 1963, as the B-side to "Till You Say You'll Be Mine". It was re-released as an A-side in September 1964 and later included on the album Breakin' It Up on the Beatles Tour! The single charted on the US Billboard Hot 100, peaking at number 99.

The song has been covered by many other artists including Country Music Star Pam Tillis, whose version hit #2 on the country charts in 1994, and The Searchers, whose version reached number 3 in the UK in 1964. Other versions, all of which made the British charts though less successfully, were recorded by Paul Carrack in 1987, Status Quo in 1995, and Agnetha Fältskog in 2004.

== Content ==
The song's lyrics attempt to detail the singer's emotions when in the presence of the person he or she loves. There is also an expression of frustration by the singer that he or she cannot manage to tell that person of his or her love.

The song was produced using the "Wall of Sound" method of Phil Spector.

== The Searchers version ==
"When You Walk in the Room"
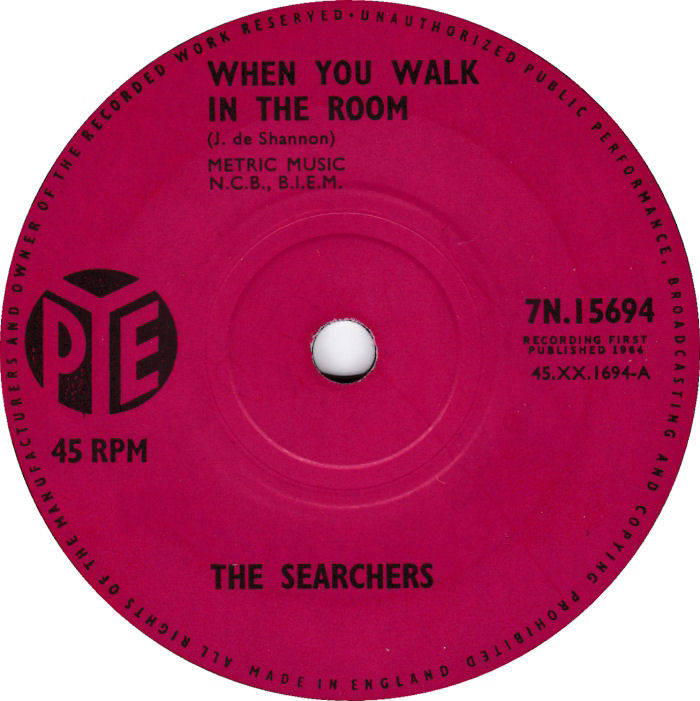
- Side A of the original UK single

Single by The Searchers
- B-side: "I'll Be Missing You"
- Released: September 11, 1964
- Genre: Folk rock
- Length: 2:22
- Label: Pye (UK); Kapp (US)
- Songwriter: Jackie DeShannon

The Searchers singles chronology
"Someday We're Gonna Love Again" (1964)	"When You Walk in the Room" (1964)	"What Have They Done to the Rain" (1964)

Official audio
- "When You Walk in the Room" (remastered) on YouTube

British rock band The Searchers had a hit song in early 1964 with "Needles and Pins," previously recorded by Jackie DeShannon, and they then recorded this, another song previously recorded by DeShannon. Their version reached No. 35 in the US and No. 3 in the UK. The group also recorded a German version titled "Wenn ich dich seh".

=== Charts ===
Chart (1964)	Peak position
Australia	1
Canada (CHUM Hit Parade)	21
Ireland (IRMA)	4
UK Singles (Official Charts)	3
US Billboard Hot 100	35

== The Sports version ==
"When You Walk in the Room"

Single by The Sports

from the album Reckless
- B-side: "True Stories"/"Taxi Rank"
- Released: July 18, 1978
- Recorded: 1978
- Studio: Armstrong Studios, Melbourne
- Genre: Pop rock
- Length: 2:32
- Label: Mushroom
- Songwriter: Jackie DeShannon
- Producer: Joe Camilleri

The Sports singles chronology
"Boys! (What Did the Detective Say?)" (1978)	"When You Walk in the Room" (1978)	"Who Listens to the Radio" (1978)

Australian rock band The Sports released a version of the song as the second single from their debut studio album, Reckless. It reached No. 42 on the Australian Kent Music Report chart.

=== Track listing ===
- Side A "When You Walk in the Room" - 2:32
- Side B1 "True Stories" - 2:34
- Side B2 "Taxi Rank" - 2:25

=== Charts ===
Chart (1978)	Position
Australian Kent Music Report	42

== Stephanie Winslow version ==
"When You Walk in the Room"

Single by Stephanie Winslow
- B-side: "Somebody to Love"
- Released: September 1981
- Genre: Country
- Length: 2:27
- Label: Warner Bros./Curb
- Songwriter: Jackie DeShannon
- Producer: Ray Ruff

Stephanie Winslow singles chronology
"I've Been a Fool" (1981)	"When You Walk in the Room" (1981)	"Slippin' and Slidin'" (1982)

The American country music artist Stephanie Winslow recorded a version of the song, reaching No. 29 on the US country singles chart.

=== Chart positions ===
Chart (1981)	Peak position
US Billboard Hot Country Songs	29

== Paul Carrack version ==
"When You Walk in the Room"

Single by Paul Carrack

from the album One Good Reason
- B-side: "Collrane"
- Released: April 27, 1987
- Recorded: 1986
- Genre: Rock
- Length: 3:25
- Label: Chrysalis
- Songwriter: Jackie DeShannon
- Producer: Christopher Neil

Paul Carrack singles chronology
"A Little Unkind" (1983)	"When You Walk in the Room" (1987)	"Don't Shed a Tear" (1987)

British singer Paul Carrack's version, from his 1987 album One Good Reason, reached No. 90 in the US and No. 48 in the UK.

It was also a Top Ten hit in Australia, peaking at No. 7.

=== Charts ===
Chart (1987–1988)	Peak position
Australia (Kent Music Report)	7
Netherlands (Single Top 100)	39
Sweden (Sverigetopplistan)	19
UK Singles (Official Charts)	48
US Billboard Hot 100	90

=== Year-end charts ===
Chart (1987)	Position
Australia (Kent Music Report)	33

== Pam Tillis version ==
"When You Walk in the Room"

Single by Pam Tillis

from the album Sweetheart's Dance
- B-side: "'Til All the Lonely's Gone"
- Released: August 6, 1994
- Genre: Country
- Length: 2:43
- Label: Arista Nashville
- Songwriter: Jackie DeShannon
- Producers: Pam Tillis; Steve Fishell

Pam Tillis singles chronology
"Spilled Perfume" (1994)	"When You Walk in the Room" (1994)	"Mi Vida Loca (My Crazy Life)" (1994)

In 1994, American country music artist Pam Tillis recorded a version for her album Sweetheart's Dance. It was released as a single, peaking at No. 2 on the US Billboard Hot Country Singles & Tracks chart. It was accompanied by a music video, which was directed by Steven Goldmann in his second video with Tillis, it features Dick Clark and depicts Tillis in a mid-1960s appearance on American Bandstand.

=== Charts ===
Chart (1994)	Peak position
Canada Country Singles (RPM)	13
US Hot Country Songs (Billboard)	2

=== Year-end charts ===
Chart (1994)	Position
US Country Songs (Billboard)	51

=== Personnel ===
Compiled from liner notes.

- Mike Brignardello — bass guitar
- Mary Chapin Carpenter — background vocals
- Rob Hajacos — fiddle
- Bob DiPiero — 12-string guitar
- Paul Franklin — steel guitar
- George Marinelli — electric guitar
- Steve Nathan — piano
- Brent Mason — electric guitar
- Kim Richey — background vocals
- Pam Tillis — lead vocals
- Biff Watson — acoustic guitar
- Lonnie Wilson — drums

== Status Quo version ==
"When You Walk in the Room"

Single by Status Quo

from the album Don't Stop
- B-side: "Tilting at the Mill" "When You Walk in the Room" (album version)
- Released: October 23, 1995
- Recorded: 1995
- Genre: Rock
- Length: 3:06; 4:05 (album version)
- Label: Polydor
- Songwriter: Jackie DeShannon
- Producer: Pip Williams

Status Quo singles chronology
"Restless" (1994)	"When You Walk in the Room" (1995)	"Fun, Fun, Fun" (1996)

The song was covered by the British rock band Status Quo for their 1996 studio album of cover versions and twenty-second studio album overall, Don't Stop, released as the album's lead single in October 1995. The song was a minor hit, reaching Number 34 in their native UK the following month. This version also appears on the band's 1997 two-disc greatest hits compilation album Whatever You Want – The Very Best of Status Quo.

=== Charts ===
Chart (1995)	Peak position
UK Singles (OCC)	34

== Agnetha Fältskog version ==
"When You Walk in the Room"

Single by Agnetha Fältskog

from the album My Colouring Book
- Released: June 14, 2004
- Genre: Pop
- Length: 3:36
- Label: WEA
- Songwriter: Jackie DeShannon
- Producers: Agnetha Fältskog; Anders Neglin; Dan Strömkvist

Agnetha Fältskog singles chronology
"If I Thought You'd Ever Change Your Mind" (2004)	"When You Walk in the Room" (2004)	"Sometimes When I'm Dreaming" (2004)

Swedish singer Agnetha Fältskog, formerly of ABBA, released her version of "When You Walk in the Room" as the second single from her 2004 album, My Colouring Book. The track peaked at number 11 in Sweden and number 34 in the UK, where it remained in the chart for only two weeks. It was remixed by Almighty and SoundFactory.

=== Charts ===
Chart (2004)	Peak position
Sweden (Sverigetopplistan)	11
UK Singles (Official Charts)	34
