= Sondra (album) =

Studio album by The Sports
- Released: May 1981
- Studio: Armstrong Studios, Melbourne, Australia
- Genre: Rock; pop
- Label: Mushroom
- Producer: Cameron Allan

The Sports chronology
Suddenly (1980)	Sondra (1981)	The Sports Play Dylan (and Donovan) (1981)

Singles from Sondra
- 1. "How Come" Released: March 1981; 2. "When We Go Out Tonight" Released: July 1981

Sondra is the fourth and final studio album by Australian rock and pop band The Sports, released in May 1981. The album peaked at number 20 on the Australian Kent Music Report.

== Reception ==
Professional ratings
Review scores
Source	Rating
AllMusic	2/5 stars

Steve Schnee from AllMusic questioned the decision to have Cameron Allan produce the album, believing his skills to be "muddy and lifeless at best," adding that "the production not only reined in the band's considerable talent, it stifled any energy and excitement that they may have had." Schnee said "Stephen Cummings still sounded confident, but ultimately seemed detached from the material, as if he was already going through the motions." Perhaps he was already planning his escape to a solo career, which came to fruition when the band split up shortly after this album was released.

== Track listing ==
Vinyl/cassette (L 37552) Side one
No.	Title	Writer(s)	Length
1.	"Against The Dance"	Martin Armiger	2:39
2.	"How Come"	Stephen Cummings, Andrew Pendlebury	3:11
3.	"When We Go Out Tonight"	Armiger, Cummings	2:57
4.	"Black Stockings (For Chelsea)"	Armiger, Cummings	3:28
5.	"Clint 1"	Pendlebury, Armiger, Cummings	0:29
6.	"This Is Really Something"	Armiger, Cummings	2:47
7.	"Softly, Softly"	Pendlebury, Cummings	2:52

Side two
No.	Title	Writer(s)	Length
1.	"Passionette"	Armiger, Cummings	2:13
2.	"Stop the Baby Talking"	Pendlebury, Cummings	3:05
3.	"Lucky Shop"	Cummings, Armiger	2:16
4.	"Clint 2"	Pendlebury, Armiger, Cummings	1:05
5.	"Face the Tiger"	Pendlebury, Cummings	2:50
6.	"Happy Feet"	Armiger, Cummings	2:05
7.	"The Last House on the Left"	Pendlebury, Cummings	3:33

== Personnel ==
The Sports

- Steve Cummings - vocals
- Martin Armiger - guitar, backing vocals
- Andrew Pendlebury - guitar, backing vocals
- Robert Glover - bass
- Freddie Strauks - drums

== Charts ==
Chart (1981)	Peak position
Australian Kent Music Report	20
