= Reckless (The Sports album) =

Studio album by The Sports
- Released: May 1978
- Studio: Armstrong Studios, Melbourne
- Genre: New wave; pop rock
- Label: Mushroom
- Producer: Joe Camilleri

The Sports chronology
Fair Game (1977)	Reckless (1978)	Don't Throw Stones (1979)

Singles from Reckless
- 1. "Boys! (What Did the Detective Say?)" Released: March 1978; 2. "When You Walk in the Room" Released: 18 July 1978

Reckless is the debut studio album by Australian pop rock band The Sports, released in May 1978. The album peaked at number 43 on the Australian Kent Music Report.

== Reception ==
Professional ratings
Review scores
Source	Rating
AllMusic	3/5 stars

John Magian from Woroni said "Reckless is one of the finest debut albums ever, to emerge from Australia; passionate, alive, and in its own way, unique." adding "Their music represents a perfect synthesis of archetypal 50s romance and the cutting edge neurotic edge of life in the 70s.Ian McFarlane thought it "displayed plenty of charm". Jim Worbois from AllMusic said; 'On first listen, The Sports sound a bit like early Joe Jackson. To leave it at that would be unfair to The Sports, who show they feel equally comfortable doing rockabilly ("Rockabilly Billy") or Van Morrison-style ballads like "You Ain't Home Yet".'

== 2014 Remaster ==
In 2014 an expanded 2-CD version was released by Warner on the Festival Label. The original album was remastered and extra tracks include live performances and demos, as well as all four tracks from their debut EP Fair Game.

== Track listing ==
Vinyl/cassette (L 36571) Side one
No.	Title	Writer(s)	Length
1.	"Boys! (What Did the Detective Say?)"	Stephen Cummings, Ed Bates	2:25
2.	"Amazon"	Cummings, David Fleet	3:01
3.	"Modern Don Juan"	Don Guess, Jack Neil	2:51
4.	"You Ain't Home Yet"	Bates, Joe Camilleri, Cummings	2:15
5.	"Mailed It to Your Sister"	Cummings, Bates	3:32
6.	"Reckless"	Andrew Pendlebury, Cummings, Bates	3:47

Side two
No.	Title	Writer(s)	Length
1.	"When You Walk in the Room"	Jackie DeShannon	2:29
2.	"Rockabilly Billy"	Cummings, Bates	3:03
3.	"Down in Chinatown"	Cummings, Bates, Camilleri	3:20
4.	"Moon on a String"	Cummings, Bates	2:33
5.	"I Put the Light On"	Cummings, Bates	4:12

== Personnel ==
The Sports

- Steve Cummings - vocals
- Ed Bates - guitar, backing vocals
- Andrew Pendlebury - guitar, backing vocals
- Jim Niven - piano, backing vocals
- Robert Glover - bass
- Paul Hitchins - drums

with:

- Joe Camilleri (as "The Camel") - saxophone

== Charts ==
Chart (1978)	Peak position
Australian Kent Music Report	43
