= Don't Throw Stones =

Studio album by The Sports
- Released: February 1979
- Studio: Armstrong Studios, Melbourne
- Genre: New wave; rock; pop
- Label: Mushroom
- Producer: Peter Solley

The Sports chronology
| Reckless (1978) | Don't Throw Stones (1979) | O.K, U.K! (1979) |

Singles from Don't Throw Stones
- 1. "Who Listens to the Radio" Released: October 1978; 2. "Don't Throw Stones" Released: February 1979; 3. "Suspicious Minds" Released: April 1979

Don't Throw Stones is the second studio album by Australian rock and pop band The Sports, released in February 1979; a limited edition with a bonus 7" promotional single of "Reckless". The album peaked at number 9 on the Australian Kent Music Report and was certified gold.

In 2010, the album was listed at number 51 on the 100 Best Australian Albums.

== Reception ==
Professional ratings
Review scores
| Source | Rating |
|---|---|
| AllMusic | 3.5/5 stars |

Luis Feliu from The Canberra Times felt "plenty of admiration for their punchy and melodic rockabilly sound, [he] found the change to the more diverse, bigger-breath songs of new a wee strange but acceptable."

== Track listing ==
Vinyl/cassette (L 36844) Side one
| No. | Title | Writer(s) | Length |
|---|---|---|---|
| 1. | "Suspicious Minds" | Martin Armiger | 3:29 |
| 2. | "Live Work & Play" | Stephen Cummings, Andrew Pendlebury | 2:54 |
| 3. | "Don't Throw Stones" | Cummings, Pendlebury | 3:40 |
| 4. | "Thru the Window" | Cummings, Pendlebury | 2:48 |
| 5. | "Who Listens to the Radio" | Cummings, Pendlebury | 3:13 |
| 6. | "Tired of Me" | Cummings, Pendlebury | 5:53 |

Side two
| No. | Title | Writer(s) | Length |
|---|---|---|---|
| 1. | "Step By Step" | Cummings, Bates | 3:39 |
| 2. | "Worst Kind" | Cummings, Pendlebury, Joe Camilleri | 2:46 |
| 3. | "So Obvious" | Cummings, Pendlebury | 3:02 |
| 4. | "Hit Single" | Armiger | 3:14 |
| 5. | "Terror Hits" | Armiger | 3:34 |
| 6. | "Big Sleep" | Cummings, Pendlebury | 2:42 |

=== Bonus 7" Single ===
Side three
| No. | Title | Writer(s) | Length |
|---|---|---|---|
| 1. | "Reckless" | Cummings, Bates, Pendlebury | 4:13 |

Side four
| No. | Title | Writer(s) | Length |
|---|---|---|---|
| 1. | "Mailed It to Your Sister" | Cummings, Bates | 2:48 |

== Personnel ==
The Sports

- Steve Cummings - vocals
- Martin Armiger - guitar, backing vocals
- Andrew Pendlebury - guitar, backing vocals
- Jim Niven - keyboards, backing vocals
- Robert Glover - bass
- Paul Hitchins - drums

with:

- Wilbur Wilde - saxophone
- Peter Solley - additional keyboards
- M. Burns - synthesiser
- G. Hyde - percussion

== Charts ==
| Chart (1979) | Peak position |
|---|---|
| Australian Kent Music Report | 9 |
| United States Billboard Hot 200 | 194 |
