= Suddenly (The Sports album) =

Studio album by the Sports
- Released: March 1980
- Recorded: 1979
- Studio: Eden Studios, Chiswick, London
- Genre: New wave; rock
- Label: Mushroom
- Producer: Peter Solley

The Sports chronology
O.K, U.K! (1979)	Suddenly (1980)	Sondra (1981)

Singles from Suddenly
- 1. "Strangers on a Train" Released: January 1980; 2. "Perhaps" Released: April 1980; 3. "No Mama No" Released: October 1980

Suddenly is the third studio album by Australian rock and pop band the Sports, released in March 1980. The album peaked at number 13 on the Australian Kent Music Report.

== Reception ==
Professional ratings
Review scores
Source	Rating
AllMusic	3/5 stars

Steve Schnee from AllMusic wrote: "Although they are fully formed three-minute slices of Aussie pop/rock, the melodies aren't as immediate and engaging as before. There are moments that are equal to the previous album, including 'Strangers on a Train', 'Never Catch Her', 'Oh Mama No', and the title track, but those high points don't occur quite as often," adding "through it all, Stephen Cummings' 'angry young man' vocals are energetic and spirited and the band is tight and inspiring."

Luis Feliu from The Canberra Times opined that it showed "trimmed up reggae-favoured tunes and souped-up straight, melodic rockers... [and] has its fair share of goodies" while he "had reservations about the overall slickness, and excesses in production for the sake of commercial acceptance" by Solley.

Ian McFarlane noticed that it "featured an even slicker, more commercial pop sound."

== Track listing ==
Vinyl/cassette (L 37131) Side one
No.	Title	Writer(s)	Length
1.	"Suddenly"	Stephen Cummings, Andrew Pendlebury	2:33
2.	"No Mama No"	Martin Armiger	3:16
3.	"Between Us"	Cummings, Pendlebury	3:13
4.	"Go"	Cummings, Pendlebury	3:27
5.	"Strangers on a Train"	Armiger	2:39
6.	"It Hurts"	Cummings, Pendlebury, Wilson	2:58

Side two
No.	Title	Writer(s)	Length
1.	"Murmurs"	Cummings, Pendlebury	2:31
2.	"I Tried To Love Her"	Armiger	2:26
3.	"Blue Hearts"	Cummings, Armiger	4:05
4.	"Perhaps"	Cummings, Wilson	4:18
5.	"The Lost and the Lonely"	Cummings, Armiger	3:10
6.	"Never Catch Her"	Cummings, Pendlebury	2:23

== Personnel ==
The Sports

- Steve Cummings - vocals
- Martin Armiger - guitar, backing vocals
- Andrew Pendlebury - guitar, backing vocals
- Jim Niven - keyboards, backing vocals
- Robert Glover - bass
- Paul Hitchins - drums

with:

- Herbie Flowers - string bass on "The Lost and the Lonely"
- The Chanter Sisters - backing vocals on "Blue Hearts" and "Perhaps"

== Charts ==
Chart (1980)	Peak position
Australian Kent Music Report	13
