= Fair Game (EP) =

EP by The Sports
- Released: 1977
- Genre: Indie pop; indie rock; pop rock
- Label: Zak
- Producer: Joe Camilleri

The Sports chronology
Fair Game (1977)	Reckless (1978)

Fair Game is the debut extended play (EP) by Australian rock band The Sports, released independently in 1977 and limited to 500 copies. It was produced by Joe Camilleri.

A copy of the EP made it to the UK rock publication New Musical Express who wasted no time in pronouncing it their "Record of the Week", which led to the group being signed to Mushroom Records in Australia.

All four tracks were included on the 2014 remastered and expanded 2-CD reissue of Reckless.

== Track listing ==
Side A
No.	Title	Writer(s)	Length
1.	"(Right) Thru Her Heart"	Steve Cummings	3:37
2.	"Twist Senorita"	Cummings, Ed Bates	2:25

Side B
No.	Title	Writer(s)	Length
1.	"In Trouble With the Girls"	Cummings	3:07
2.	"Red Cadillac & a Black Moustache"	Willie Bea Thompson	2:51

== Personnel ==
The Sports

- Steve Cummings – vocals
- Ed Bates – guitar
- Jim Niven – piano
- Robert Glover – bass
- Paul Hitchins – drums

with:

- Joe Camilleri – saxophone
