= Who Listens to the Radio =

- North American cover

Single by The Sports

from the album Don't Throw Stones
- Released: October 1978
- Recorded: T.C.S. Studios, Melbourne.
- Genre: Pop rock; new wave
- Length: 3:17
- Label: Mushroom Records
- Songwriter(s): Stephen Cummings; Andrew Pendlebury
- Producer(s): Pete Solley

The Sports singles chronology
"When You Walk in the Room" (1978)	"Who Listens to the Radio" (1978)	"Don't Throw Stones" (1979)

"Who Listens to the Radio" is a song recorded by Australian rock band The Sports. The song was written by band members Stephen Cummings and Andrew Pendlebury. The original single version was released in October 1978. In 1979, it was reworked and re-recorded as a new lead single from the band's second studio album, Don't Throw Stones (1979), the song peaked at number 35 on the Australian Kent Music Report.

The song was released in the United States and peaked at number 45 on the Billboard Hot 100 in November 1979, as well as appearing in an episode of WKRP in Cincinnati during that time.

== Track listing ==
Australian 7" single (K 7300)

- Side A "Who Listens to the Radio" - 3:17
- Side B "So Obvious" - 2:53

North American 7" single (Arista – AS 0468)

- Side A "Who Listens to the Radio" - 3:17
- Side B "Hit Single" - 3:14

United Kingdom 12" single (Stiff – LAST 5)

- Side A1 "Who Listens to the Radio" - 3:17
- Side A2 "Step By Step"
- Side B1 "So Obvious" - 2:53
- Side B2 "Suspicious Minds"

== Charts ==
Chart (1978/79)	peak position
Australian Kent Music Report	35
US Billboard Hot 100	45
