= How Come (The Sports song) =

- Australian cover

Single by The Sports

from the album Sondra
- Released: March 1981
- Recorded: AAV Studios, Melbourne
- Genre: Pop rock; new wave
- Length: 3:10
- Label: Mushroom Records
- Songwriter(s): Stephen Cummings; Andrew Pendlebury
- Producer(s): Cameron Allan

The Sports singles chronology
"No Mama No" (1980)	"How Come" (1981)	"When We Go Out Tonight" (1981)

"How Come" is a song recorded by Australian rock band The Sports. The song was written by band members Stephen Cummings and Andrew Pendlebury. Released in March 1981 as the lead single from the band's fourth studio album, Sondra (1981), the song peaked at number 21 on the Australian Kent Music Report, becoming the band's highest charting single.

== Track listing ==
Australian 7" single (K 8237)

- Side A "How Come" - 3:10
- Side B "Drug Sluts" - 3:39

== Charts ==
Chart (1981)	Position
Australian Kent Music Report	21
