= Strangers on a Train (song) =

- Australian cover

Single by The Sports

from the album Suddenly
- Released: January 1980
- Genre: Pop rock; new wave
- Length: 2:38
- Label: Mushroom Records
- Songwriter(s): Martin Armiger
- Producer(s): Peter Solley

The Sports singles chronology
"Wedding Ring" (1979)	"Strangers on a Train" (1980)	"Perhaps" (1980)

"Strangers on a Train" is a song recorded by Australian rock band The Sports. The song was written by band member Martin Armiger. Released in January 1980 as the lead single from the band's third studio album, Suddenly (1980), the song peaked at number 22 on the Australian Kent Music Report.

== Track listing ==
Australian 7" single (K 7767)

- Side A "Strangers on a Train" - 2:38
- Side B "Can't Ever Decide" (live at Bombay Rock) - 3:38

== Charts ==
Chart (1980)	Position
Australian Kent Music Report	22
