= Boys! (What Did the Detective Say?) =

Single by The Sports

from the album Reckless
- Released: March 1978
- Recorded: Armstrong Studios, Melbourne.
- Genre: Pop rock
- Length: 2:25
- Label: Mushroom Records
- Songwriter(s): Stephen Cummings; Ed Bates
- Producer(s): Joe Camilleri

The Sports singles chronology
"Boys! (What Did the Detective Say?)" (1978)	"When You Walk in the Room" (1978)

"Boys! (What Did the Detective Say?)" is the debut single by Australian rock band the Sports. The song was written by band members Stephen Cummings and Ed Bates and produced by Joe Camilleri. Released in March 1978 as the lead single from the band's debut studio album Reckless (1978), the song peaked at number 55 on the Australian Kent Music Report.

John Magowan of Woroni described the song as "adolescent bravado".

== Track listing ==
Australian 7" single (K 7089)

- Side A "Boys! (What Did the Detective Say?)" - 2:25
- Side B "Modern Don Juan"

== Charts ==
Chart (1978)	Position
Australian Kent Music Report	55
