= Don't Throw Stones (song) =

- United Kingdom cover

Single by The Sports

from the album Don't Throw Stones
- Released: February 1979
- Recorded: Armstrong Studios, Melbourne.
- Genre: Pop rock; new wave
- Length: 3:23
- Label: Mushroom Records
- Songwriter(s): Stephen Cummings; Andrew Pendlebury
- Producer(s): Peter Solley

The Sports singles chronology
"Who Listens to the Radio" (1978)	"Don't Throw Stones" (1979)	"Suspicious Minds" (1979)

"Don't Throw Stones" is a song recorded by Australian rock band The Sports. The song was written by band members Stephen Cummings and Andrew Pendlebury. Released in February 1979 as the second single from the band's second studio album, Don't Throw Stones (1979), the song peaked at number 26 on the Australian Kent Music Report.

In January 2018, as part of Triple M's "Ozzest 100", the 'most Australian' songs of all time, "Don't Throw Stones" was ranked number 86.

== Reception ==
Cash Box magazine said "Lead singer Steve Cummings' forceful vocals should sell AOR, pop programmers on this track."

== Track listing ==
Australian 7" single (K 7383)

- Side A "Don't Throw Stones" - 3:23
- Side B "Terror Hits" - 3:41

North American 7" single (Arista – AS 0482)

- Side A "Don't Throw Stones" - 2:58
- Side B "Mailed It to Your Sister" - 2:47

United Kingdom 7" single (Sire – SIR 6002)

- Side A "Don't Throw Stones" - 2:58
- Side B "The Worst Kind"

== Charts ==
Chart (1979)	Peak position
Australian Kent Music Report	36
