= Andrew Pendlebury =

Australian guitarist-songwriter (born 1952)

- Born: Andrew Scott Pendlebury; 1952 (age 73–74); Melbourne, Victoria, Australia
- Genres: R&B, country, post-punk, Southern gospel
- Occupation: Musician
- Instruments: Guitar, backing vocals
- Years active: 1975–present
- Labels: Cleopatra, WEA, East West

Andrew Scott Pendlebury (born 1952) is an Australian guitarist-songwriter. From 1977 to 1981 was a member of The Sports and from 1986 to 1988 he joined Slaughtermen. He has undertaken other projects and issued four solo albums. At the ARIA Music Awards of 1993, Pendlebury's solo work, Don't Hold Back That Feeling, won the ARIA Award for Best Adult Contemporary Album. From 2003 he has been a member of The Mercurials.

== Early life ==
Pendlebury was born in Melbourne, Victoria in 1952 and grew up there. His father, Laurence "Scott" Pendlebury (1914–1986); and mother, Eleanor Constance "Nornie" Gude (8 December 1915 – 24 January 2002); were both visual artists. His older sister, Anne Lorraine Pendlebury (born 21 August 1946), became a stage, film and TV actress. In May 1953 Scott won the Dunlop Art Contest, with a first prize of A£300, ahead of Arthur Boyd.

From the age of four years Pendlebury studied classical violin learning Bach and Vivaldi. After completing secondary education, Pendlebury followed his parents into visual arts and exhibited art works, which were "mainly impressionistic-style landscapes". Inspired by Django Reinhardt and Jimi Hendrix, Pendlebury taught himself guitar and began a career in music. By 1979 Anne appeared in the ABC-TV drama series, Twenty Good Years. Scott's portrait of his two children, Anne and Drew Pendlebury (actress and musician respectively), was a finalist for the 1979 Archibald Prize.

In the mid-1970s Pendlebury was a member of The Sharks with Peter Crosbie on keyboards. In 1976 he joined an R&B, country outfit, The Myriad Band, with Carrl Myriad on guitar and vocals, Mark Ferrie on bass guitar, Phil Smith on drums, and Chris Wilson on organ. This line-up provided three live tracks, "Ballad of the Station Hotel", "Rock 'n' Roll Highway" and "Glenrowan", for a Various Artists album, Live at the Station (1977).

== Career ==
=== 1977–1987: The Sports, The Dugites, Slaughtermen ===
In August 1977 Andrew Pendlebury left Myriad to join an R&B, rockabilly group, The Sports. The Sports had formed a year earlier with Stephen Cummings on lead vocals, Ed Bates on guitar, Paul Hitchins on drums, Robert Glover (ex-Myriad) on bass guitar and Jim Niven on piano. Upon joining Pendlebury also assisted Cummings with songwriting. The band released their first album, Reckless, in 1978 on Mushroom Records, which peaked at No. 43 on the Australian Kent Music Report Albums Chart. It provided four charting singles. "Who Listens to the Radio", co-written by Cummings and Pendlebury, peaked at No. 45 on the United States Billboard Pop Singles chart in November 1979.

Their second album, Don't Throw Stones, consolidated their Australian chart success, peaking at No. 9, Their third album, Suddenly, featured a slicker, more pop sound, and charted at No. 74. During his time with The Sports, Pendlebury worked on side projects, including The Gentlemen with Bates, Wayne Duncan (Daddy Cool) on bass guitar, and Freddie Strauks (Skyhooks) on drums. The Sports fourth album, Sondra (No. 20), was released in 1981. By the end of 1981 The Sports had disbanded.

Pendlebury spent a year with The Dugites alongside The Sharks' bandmate, Crosbie on keyboards and backing vocals, and Lynda Nutter on lead vocals. During his brief tenure they issued the related mini-album, No Money (August 1982). In 1983 he joined the Stephen Cummings Band reuniting with Cummings and Ferrie. Pendlebury played on Cummings' first solo album Senso (released August 1984) and subsequent three albums, This Wonderful Life (September 1986), Lovetown (January 1988) and A New Kind of Blue (March 1989). Pendlebury also toured Australia with Stephen Cummings' Lovetown.

From 1986 Andrew Pendlebury joined a post-punk, Southern gospel group, Slaughtermen, with Ferrie, Ian Stephen on vocals, piano and organ; and Des Hefner on drums. The group released two albums, Still Lovin' You (1986) and Melbourne, Memphis and a Mansion in the Sky (1988), before Pendlebury began to focus on his solo career.

=== 1987–2000: Solo albums ===
In July 1987 Pendlebury released his debut solo album, Between the Horizon and the Dockyard, on Cleopatra Records which was co-produced by Pendlebury with Mark Woods. For the album he was backed by Ferrie and drummer Peter Jones, with Cummings guesting on lead vocals for "She Set Fire to the House", which was issued as a single in September. According to Australian rock music historian, Ian McFarlane, the album showcased "an eclectic mix of styles from country swing, Spanish, Bluegrass, jazz and rock".

In 1988 Pendlebury released his second solo album, Tigerland, which was followed in 1990 by Zing Went the Strings on WEA Records. On both albums Pendlebury worked with Pete Linden (pedal steel), Paul Grabowsky (piano), Stephen Hadley (bass), J. J. Hacket (drums), Shane O'Mara, Nick Smith, Cummings, Doug de Vries and Michael Williams.

For his fourth solo album, Don't Hold Back That Feeling (1992), Pendlebury enlisted guest vocalists including Chris Wilson, Deborah Conway, Kate Ceberano and Dave Steel. The album was critically acclaimed and, the following year, won the ARIA Award for Best Adult Contemporary Album at the ARIA Music Awards of 1993.

In 1993 he collaborated with De Vries on an album Karate and again in 1995 to record Trouble and Desire for ABC Music.

In 1999 McFarlane had described Pendlebury as having "pursued a career that garnered him much critical acclaim, but little in the way of mainstream success. Although occasionally compared with Tommy Emmanuel, Pendlebury has preferred to follow a more low-key, highly specialised path away from the limelight".

=== 2002–present: The Mercurials ===
In 2002 Pendlebury reunited with Ferrie and formed a twin guitar duo; the following year they released an album, Late Night at the Nicholas Building. When they added a third member, Adi Sappir, an Israeli cellist, they were named, The Mercurials. Their first performance was at the Ian Potter Gallery in the National Gallery of Victoria in December 2003.

In March 2004 they appeared at the Adelaide Fringe Festival, which was followed by appearances at the 2006 Port Fairy Folk Festival and Mt Beauty Music Muster. In July 2005 The Mercurials released their debut self-titled album. This was followed by a second one, Tangents in 2008, and a third album, Silver and Gold in 2009.

== Discography ==
=== Albums ===
Title	Details
Between the Horizon and the Dockyard	Released: July 1987; Label: Cleopatra (CLP 233); Format: LP, cassette
Tigerland	Released: 1988; Label: Cleopatra (CLP253); Format: LP, cassette
Zing Went the Strings	Released: 1990; Label: WEA (903171684-1); Format: LP, cassette
Don't Hold Back That Feeling	Released: 1992; Label: EastWest (903176295-2); Format: LP, cassette
Karate (with Doug De Vries)	Released: 1993; Label: ABC Music (518537-2); Format: CD
Trouble and Desire (with Doug De Vries)	Released: 1995; Label: ABC Music (479811-2); Format: CD
Late Night at the Nicholas Building (with Mark Ferrie)	Released: 2003; Label: Greasy Pole (479811-2); Format: CD

=== Singles ===
List of singles, with selected chart positions
Title	Year	Peak chart positions	Album
Title	Year	AUS	Album
"She Set Fire to the House" (with Stephen Cummings)	1987	—	Between the Horizon and the Dockyard
"Calling You" (with Kate Ceberano)	1992	97	Between the Horizon and the Dockyard

== Awards and nominations ==
=== ARIA Music Awards ===
The ARIA Music Awards is an annual awards ceremony held by the Australian Recording Industry Association. Pendlebury has won one award from two nominations.

Year	Nominee / work	Award	Result
1991	Zing... Went the Strings	Best Adult Contemporary Album	Nominated
1993	Don't Hold Back that Feeling	Best Adult Contemporary Album	Won
