= The Sports =

Australian rock band

- Origin: Melbourne, Victoria, Australia
- Genres: Rock; new wave
- Years active: 1976–1981
- Labels: Zac; Mushroom; Stiff; Arista; Sire; Raven; Festival
- Past members: see members list below

The Sports were an Australian rock band which performed and recorded between 1976 and 1981. Mainstay members were Stephen Cummings on lead vocals and Robert Glover on bass guitar, with long-term members such as Paul Hitchins on drums, Andrew Pendlebury on lead guitar and vocals, and Martin Armiger on guitar. Their style was similar to both 1970s British pub rock bands (such as Brinsley Schwarz) and British new wave (such as Elvis Costello). The Sports' top forty singles are "Who Listens to the Radio", "Don't Throw Stones", "Strangers on a Train" and "How Come" . Their top 20 releases on the Australian Kent Music Report Albums Chart are Don't Throw Stones (February 1979), Suddenly (March 1980) and Sondra (May 1981).

In October 2010 Don't Throw Stones was listed in the book, 100 Best Australian Albums.

== History ==
The Sports were formed in 1976 by Stephen Cummings who had been the lead singer of Melbourne rockabilly group, The Pelaco Brothers, (which also comprised Joe Camilleri, Peter Lillie and Johnny Topper). The original line-up was Cummings and ex-The Pelaco Brothers bandmate, Ed Bates, on guitar, Robert Glover (ex-Myriad) on bass guitar, Jim Niven (ex-The Captain Matchbox Whoopee Band) on piano and Paul Hitchins on drums. Their early sets contained covers of Chuck Berry, Billy Emerson, Don Covay, Company Caine and Graham Parker material. Original songs, mostly written by Cummings and Bates, completed their sets. The Sports' debut recording was a four-track extended play, Fair Game, which was released in early 1977 on the independent label, Zac Records. A friend in London posted the record to the New Musical Express (aka NME) which declared it 'Record of the Week'.

The Sports were in tune with music trends dominating London rock and had provided song-based rock as an antidote to punk, which was dubbed new wave. Cummings was compared favourably with Mick Jagger and Bates was praised for his slide guitar style: being similar to Little Feat. "We were totally surprised", Cummings said in 1997 of the NME review; he continued, "It was the last thing you'd expect. It was my making and my undoing in some ways. When you have everything go right so quickly you expect that everything after that is going to be good and that easy. It meant that I probably didn't put myself out as much as I should have."

Andrew Pendlebury (ex-Myriad) joined on guitar in August 1977 and assisted Cummings with song writing. Cummings recalled, "I just vaguely met people and dragged them into it. I always wanted Andrew in the group as a guitarist and I had an idea for a rockabilly country sound. But I always wanted to change it because I really liked the MC5 and wanted to make it more like that as well." In May 1978 The Sports issued their debut studio album, Reckless, on Mushroom Records with ex-The Pelaco Brothers bandmate, Camilieri, as their producer. John Magowan of Woroni enthused about the "passionate, alive, and in its own way, unique" album, which showed "a perfect synthesis of archetypal 50's romance and the cutting neurotic edge of life in the 70's." Australian musicologist, Ian McFarlane, felt it "displayed plenty of charm, but failed to capture the atmosphere of the band's sweaty live shows."

The lead track, "Boys! (What Did the Detective Say?)", was released in March 1978 and peaked at 55 on the Australian Kent Music Report Singles Chart. In England it provided some confusion with the similarly titled, "Watching the Detectives", by Elvis Costello, which had been released in the previous October.

In August 1978 Cummings brought in Martin Armiger (ex-Toads, Bleeding Hearts, High Rise Bombers) on guitar, vocals and for song writing, to replace Bates. According to McFarlane, Bates had been "ousted" as Armiger "had a more commercial outlook". On the strength of Reckless, The Sports were chosen to support Graham Parker & the Rumour's Australian tour later that year. Luis Feliu of The Canberra Times described The Sports in September that year, "[their] roots lie in the fifties or early rock 'n' roll, rhythm and blues ... [Cummings and Bates] pen short and sharp songs ... [while Armiger] brings with him a more electric sound." Parker arranged for The Sports to support their United Kingdom tour in February of the following year. Fellow Australian musician Keith Shadwick accompanied the band on the tour and wrote an extensive account for the Australian music magazine Roadrunner.

They supported Thin Lizzy at the iconic concert in front of an estimated 100,000 people at Sydney Opera House in October 1978.

In November, they started work on their second album, Don't Throw Stones, with Pete Solley and Dave Robinson producing. It was released in February 1979 ahead of their joining Graham Parker & the Rumour's UK tour. Feliu felt "plenty of admiration for their punchy and melodic rockabilly sound, [he] found the change to the more diverse, bigger-breath songs of new a wee strange but acceptable." While in the UK they recorded another four-track EP, O.K, U.K!, which appeared in August that year.

Don't Throw Stones reached No. 9 on the Kent Music Report Albums Chart, which provided two top 40 singles, "Who Listens to the Radio" (November 1978) and the title track (March 1979). "Who Listens to the Radio?", was their only hit on the United States Billboard Pop Singles chart, peaking at No. 45 in November 1979. Stiff issued material from the first two Australian albums under the name, Don't Throw Stones, in October 1979; while Arista Records released it in the US and continental Europe.

The group's third album, Suddenly, was released in March 1980 and was also produced by Solley. Feliu opined that it showed "trimmed up reggae-favoured tunes and souped-up straight, melodic rockers... [and] has its fair share of goodies" while he "had reservations about the overall slickness, and excesses in production for the sake of commercial acceptance" by Solley. McFarlane noticed that it "featured an even slicker, more commercial pop sound." In Australia, the album reached No. 13 and its lead single, "Strangers on a Train", peaked at No. 22. Before the album had appeared Hitchins was replaced by Iain McLennan (ex-Ariel, Mondo Rock) on drums and Niven was replaced by Red Symons (ex-Skyhooks) on keyboards. To promote the album, in March and April 1980, The Sports undertook a national tour with Mushroom label mates, Split Enz. Symons left after the tour and McLennan, who had hepatitis in May, was then replaced by Freddie Strauks (Symons' bandmate from Skyhooks) on drums.

In 1981, the Sports had another top 30 hit on the Australian singles chart with "How Come"; and a top 20 album with Sondra. The Sports broke up late in 1981 with Cummings going on a solo singing career; Armiger became a composer for film and TV after moving to Sydney; Pendlebury joined The Dugites; Strauks joined Jo Jo Zep & The Falcons; and Glover was in Wilbur Wilde's backing band. In October 2010, their 1979 album, Don't Throw Stones, was listed in the book, 100 Best Australian Albums.

On 14 November 1998, the band reformed for a one-off performance at the Mushroom 25 concert, held to celebrate the 25th anniversary of Mushroom Records.

Jim Niven died of cancer on 9 April 2012.

== Members ==
- Stephen Cummings – lead vocals (1976–1981)
- Andrew Pendlebury – guitars, backing vocals (1976–1981)
- Ed Bates – guitars (1976–1978)
- Jim Niven – keyboards, backing vocals (1976–1980; died 2012)
- Robert Glover – bass (1976–1981)
- Paul Hitchins – drums (1976–1980)
- Martin Armiger – guitars, backing vocals (1978–1981; died 2019)
- Red Symons – keyboards (1980)
- Iain McLennan – drums (1980)
- Freddie Strauks – drums (1980–1981)

== Discography ==
=== Studio albums ===
- Reckless (1978)
- Don't Throw Stones (1979)
- Suddenly (1980)
- Sondra (1981)

=== Live albums ===
- Missin' Your Kissing (1987)

== Awards and nominations ==
=== King of Pop Awards ===
The King of Pop Awards were voted by the readers of TV Week. The King of Pop award started in 1967 and ran through to 1978.

Year	Nominee / work	Award	Result
1978	themselves	Most Popular New Group	Won

=== TV Week / Countdown Awards ===
Countdown was an Australian pop music TV series on national broadcaster ABC-TV from 1974 to 1987, it presented music awards from 1979 to 1987, initially in conjunction with magazine TV Week. The TV Week / Countdown Awards were a combination of popular-voted and peer-voted awards.

Year	Nominee / work	Award	Result
1979	themselves	Most Outstanding Achievement	Nominated
