= What the World Needs Now =

What the World Needs Now may refer to:

- "What the World Needs Now Is Love", a 1965 popular song with lyrics by Hal David and music composed by Burt Bacharach
- What the World Needs Now Is Love (Wynonna Judd album), 2003
- What the World Needs Now Is Love (Sweet Inspirations album), 1968
- What the World Needs Now: The Music of Burt Bacharach, a 1997 McCoy Tyner album
- What the World Needs Now..., 2015 album by Public Image Ltd
- "What the World Needs Now" (Glee), an episode of the American musical television series Glee
- What the World Needs Now, a 2025 album by Smokey Robinson

== See also ==
- What the World Needs Now Is ...: The Definitive Collection, 1994 album by Jackie DeShannon
- What the World Needs Now: Stan Getz Plays Burt Bacharach and Hal David, 1968 album by saxophonist Stan Getz
