= Put a Little Love in Your Heart =

1969 song by Jackie DeShannon

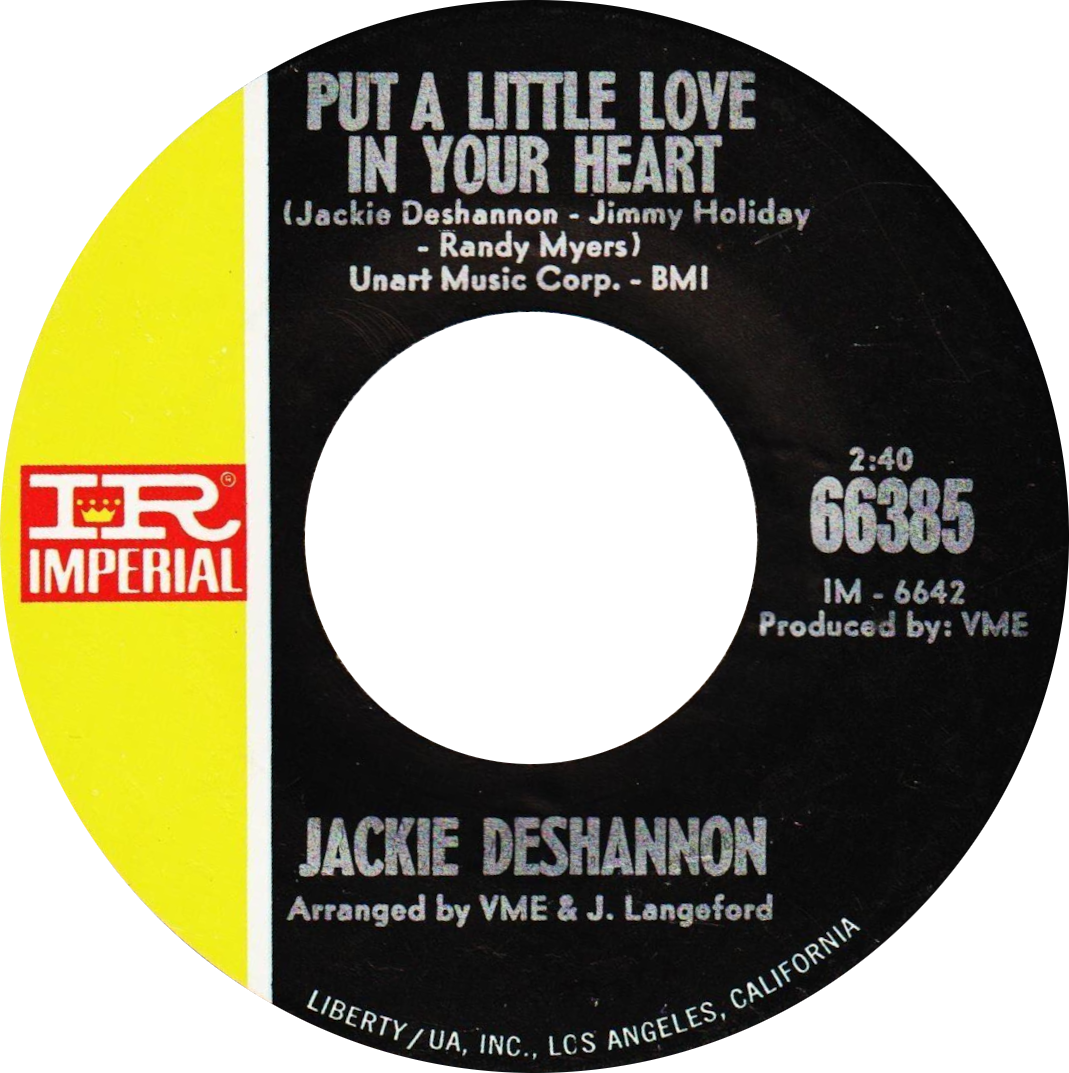
- One of side-A labels of the US single

Single by Jackie DeShannon

from the album Put a Little Love in Your Heart
- B-side: "Always Together"
- Released: June 1969
- Recorded: 1969
- Genre: Pop
- Length: 2:39
- Label: Imperial Records
- Songwriters: Jackie DeShannon, Jimmy Holiday, Randy Myers
- Producer: VME

Jackie DeShannon singles chronology
"Trust in Me" (1969)	"Put a Little Love in Your Heart" (1969)	"Love Will Find a Way" (1969)

Audio video
- "Put a Little Love in Your Heart" on YouTube

"Put a Little Love in Your Heart" is a song originally performed in 1969 by Jackie DeShannon, who composed it with her brother Randy Myers and Jimmy Holiday. In the U.S., it was DeShannon's highest-charting hit, reaching number 4 on the Hot 100 in August 1969 and number 2 on the Adult Contemporary chart. In late 1969, the song reached number 1 on South Africa's hit parade. The song rivalled the success of her signature song, "What the World Needs Now Is Love".

In 1988, Annie Lennox and Al Green released a cover version of "Put a Little Love in Your Heart" which reached number 9 on the US Billboard Hot 100.

== Charts ==
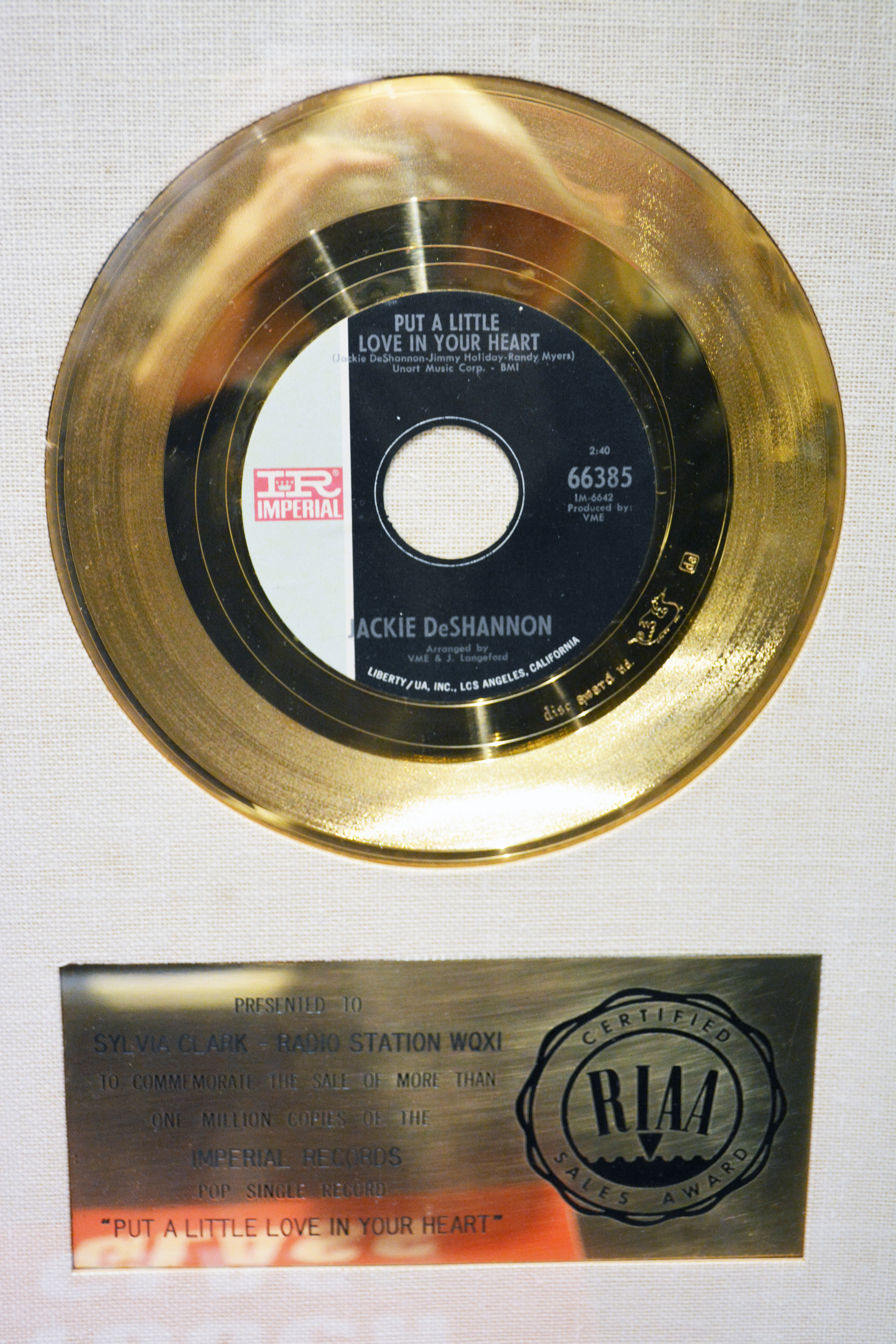
RIAA gold record for "Put a Little Love in Your Heart", by Jackie DeShannon

Chart (1969)	Peak position
Australia Kent Music Report	15
Canada RPM Top Singles	12
Canada Adult Contemporary (RPM)	2
South African Singles Chart	1
US Billboard Hot 100	4
US Adult Contemporary (Billboard)	2

== Annie Lennox and Al Green version ==
"Put a Little Love in Your Heart"
- Picture sleeve for US vinyl edition

Single by Annie Lennox and Al Green

from the album Scrooged soundtrack
- B-side: "A Great Big Piece of Love" by The Spheres of Celestial Influence
- Released: 1988
- Recorded: 1988
- Genre: Pop
- Length: 3:48
- Label: A&M
- Songwriters: Jackie DeShannon, Jimmy Holiday, Randy Myers
- Producer: David A. Stewart

Annie Lennox singles chronology
"Put a Little Love in Your Heart" (1988)	"Why" (1992)

Al Green singles chronology
"Everything's Gonna Be Alright" (1987)	"Put a Little Love in Your Heart" (1988)	"As Long as We're Together" (1989)

Audio video
- "Put a Little Love in Your Heart" on YouTube

In 1988, Annie Lennox and Al Green recorded a version that was released as the ending theme song to the 1988 film Scrooged. The song reached number 9 in the US on the Hot 100 in January 1989, and climbed all the way to number 2 on both the US Adult Contemporary and Canadian Singles charts, as well as becoming a top 40 hit in several countries worldwide, including number 28 in the UK for the festive season of 1988–1989. Although credited to Lennox, the song was produced by her Eurythmics partner David A. Stewart. The b-side "A Great Big Piece of Love" is an experimental track by Eurythmics, credited under the alias 'The Spheres of Celestial Influence'.

The video was directed by Sophie Muller.

=== Personnel ===
- Annie Lennox – vocals
- Al Green – vocals
- David A. Stewart (uncredited) – background vocals, guitar, bass guitar, keyboards, drums

=== Charts ===
==== Weekly charts ====
Chart (1988–89)	Peak position
Australian Singles Chart	6
Austrian Singles Chart	4
Canadian Singles Chart	2
German Singles Chart	20
Irish Singles Chart	30
Italy Airplay (Music & Media)	2
New Zealand Singles Chart	7
UK Singles Chart	28
US Billboard Hot 100	9

==== Year-end charts ====
Chart (1989)	Position
Canada Top Singles (RPM)	51

== Other well-known versions ==
- Susan Raye, on her debut 1969 album, One Night Stand. It was released as a single and peaked at number 30 on the Billboard Hot Country Songs chart.
- The Dave Clark Five, in 1969. Issued as a single in the UK, it spent four weeks in the top 75, reaching number 31.
- At the end of Richard Donner's film Scrooged (1988), Bill Murray breaks the fourth wall to lead a sing-along of the Annie Lennox and Al Green version of the song.
