= Mama's Song (disambiguation) =

"Mama's Song" is a song by Carrie Underwood, composed by Kara DioGuardi / Luke Laird / Marti Frederiksen.

Mama's Song may also refer to

- "Mama's Song" by Lynyrd Skynyrd, composed by Rossington Thomasson Van Zant Medlocke from Christmas Time Again
- "Mama's Song" by Kirk Franklin & the Family, composed Franklin from Whatcha Lookin' 4
- "Mama's Song" by The Heptones and Nicky Thomas 1974
- "Mama's Song" by Jackie DeShannon, composed by Buddy Buie / James Cobb from Put a Little Love in Your Heart
- "Mama's Song", song by Billy Joe Royal from Cherry Hill Park 1970
- "Mama's Song", by John Cale from Music for a New Society
- "Be Thankful (Mama's Song)", by Loose Ends from Zagora
