= You Won't Forget Me =

You Won't Forget Me may refer to:

- You Won't Forget Me (album), a 1991 album by Shirley Horn
- "You Won't Forget Me" (song), a 1997 song by La Bouche
- "You Won't Forget Me", a 1953 song by Kermit Goell and Fred Spielman, first introduced in the film Torch Song, the title track of the Shirley Horn album
- "You Won't Forget Me", a 1962 song written by Sharon Sheeley and Jackie DeShannon, recorded by DeShannon and the title track of her compilation albums You Won't Forget Me (1965) and You Won't Forget Me: The Complete Liberty Singles (Volume 1) (2009)
