= This Is Jackie DeShannon =

Studio album by Jackie DeShannon
- Released: 1965
- Label: Imperial
- Producer: Burt Bacharach; with Hal David on "What the World Needs Now Is Love" and "A Lifetime of Loneliness"

Jackie DeShannon chronology
Breakin' It Up on The Beatles Tour! (1964)	This Is Jackie DeShannon (1965)	In the Wind (1965)

Singles from This Is Jackie DeShannon
- 1. "What The World Needs Now Is Love" Released: 1965

Professional ratings
Review scores
Source	Rating
Record Mirror	5/5 stars

This Is Jackie DeShannon is an LP album by Jackie DeShannon, released by Imperial Records under catalog number LP-9286 as a monophonic recording in 1965, and later in stereo under catalog number LP-12286 the same year. The cover was credited to Woody Woodward and the photography to Ivan Nagy.

== Track listing ==
Track	Song	Writer(s)	Time
1	"What the World Needs Now Is Love"	Burt Bacharach, Hal David	3:10
2	"Take Me Away"	Randy Newman	3:00
3	"Summertime"	George Gershwin, DuBose Heyward	2:01
4	"Am I Making It Hard On You?"	DeShannon, Sharon Sheeley	2:31
5	"Go On Your Way"	Dick Glasser	2:44
6	"After Last Night"	Jimmy Smith	2:24
7	"A Lifetime of Loneliness"	Burt Bacharach, Hal David	2:34
8	"Take Me Tonight"	Aaron Schroeder, Roy Alfred, Wally Gold	2:50
9	"Hellos and Goodbyes"	DeShannon, Sharon Sheeley	2:07
10	"I'm Gonna Be Strong"	Barry Mann, Cynthia Weil	2:07
11	"Don't Let the Sun Catch You Crying"	Joe Greene	3:52
12	"I Remember the Boy"	DeShannon	2:55
