= Michael J. Moritz Jr. =

American theatrical producer

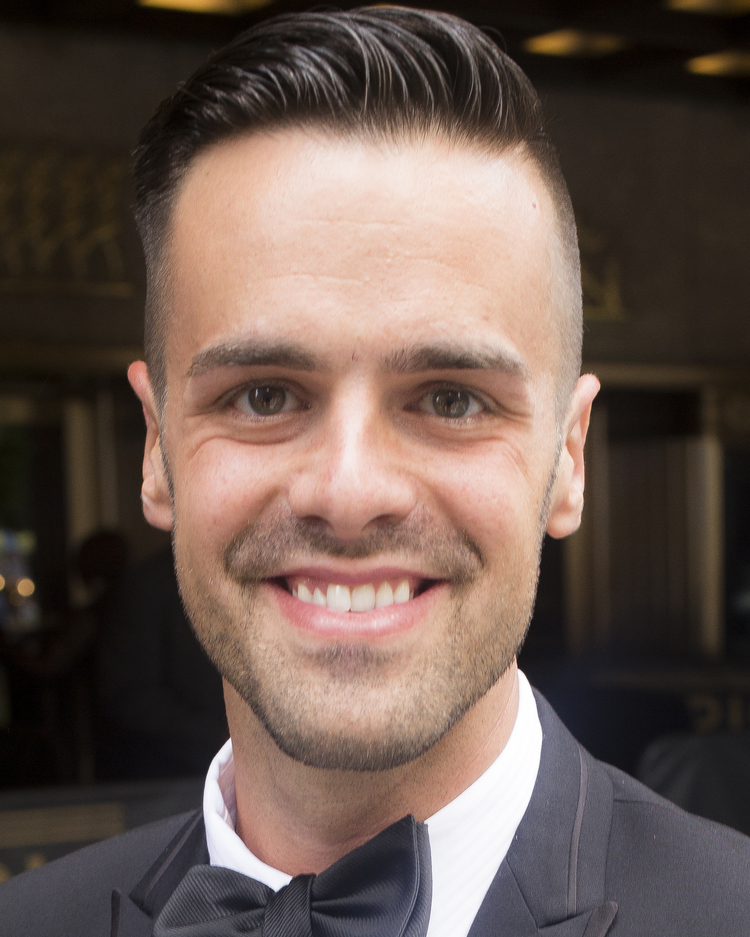
- Occupations: Theatrical Producer, Music Producer, Music Director, Pianist, Entertainment Entrepreneur
- Website: www.michaelmoritz.com

Michael J. Moritz Jr. is a Grammy Award nominee, Tony Award winner, an Emmy Award winner, American theatrical producer, record producer, music supervisor, music director, arranger, Broadway music supervisor, performer and pianist. Michael's work as a pianist, music director and arranger is featured on many recordings in the pop and musical theatre genres. Michael is on the Board of Directors for The Angel Band Project.

== Early life ==
Michael is originally from Youngstown, Ohio.

== Career ==
Most recently, Michael received the 2019 Tony Award for Best Musical as a co-producer for Broadway's Hadestown and the 2017 Emmy Award for Audio for his work on From Broadway with Love: A Benefit Concert for Orlando. He also received both TONY and Olivier award nominations as a co producer for Broadway/West End's Beautiful: The Carole King Musical. Other notable Broadway producing credits include Big Fish, A Night With Janis Joplin, On The Town, and The Velocity of Autumn. Michael has musically directed 200+ theatrical productions throughout the US and UK. Known as the ‘Musical Director to the Stars,’ Michael has received high praise for his music direction and performance piano work in both Broadway and Pop arenas. Michael was seen on the Broadway stage as on-stage piano and vocals in A Night With Janis Joplin. In 2017, Michael was nominated for an Emmy Award for his work as audio engineer for the DVD release of the show. Michael has music directed, produced and performed with notable performers including Stephen Schwartz, Sara Bareilles, Carole King, Bernadette Peters, Audra McDonald, Sean Hayes, Lin-Manuel Miranda, Matthew Broderick, Andrea Martin, Rosie O'Donnell, Marissa Jaret Winokur, Alice Ripley, Sarah Jessica Parker, Whoopi Goldberg, Billy Porter, Len Cariou, Tommy Tune, Renée Elise Goldsberry, Jessie Mueller, Kimiko Glenn, Orfeh, Rosie Perez, Kelli O'Hara, Lillias White, Carmen Cusack, Andréa Burns, Keala Settle, Marc Shaiman, Frank Wildhorn, Micky Dolenz, Tituss Burgess, Ace Young, Diana DeGarmo, Michael Cerveris, Norbert Leo Butz, James Monroe Iglehart, Aaron Tveit, Tiffany, Brandi Carlile, Richard Kind, Lena Hall, Robin DeJesus, Andrea McArdle, Chip Zien, Billy Magnussen, MacKenzie Mauzy, Lilla Crawford, Jeff Goldblum, Brian Stokes Mitchell, Laura Osnes, Lesli Margherita, Michael Cerveris, Christopher Sieber, The Muppets, Sesame Street, Ahrens and Flaherty, Linda Eder, Mary Testa, Julia Murney, Nikki Blonsky, Claybourne Elder, Melissa van der Shyff, Bobby Steggert, Capathia Jenkins, Christine Ebersole, Mimi Bessette, Phillip Boykin, Vince Oddo, Ben Hope, Randy Rainbow and Krystal Joy Brown.

== Broadway productions ==
- Big Fish, 2013 - 2013 Producer
- A Night With Janis Joplin, 2013 - 2014 Producer
- Beautiful the Carole King Musical, 2013 - Producer
- The Velocity of Autumn, 2014 - 2014 Producer
- On the Town, 2014 - 2015 Producer
- Hadestown, 2019 - Producer

== West End productions ==
- Beautiful the Carole King Musical, 2015 - 2017 Producer

== Australian productions ==
- Beautiful the Carole King Musical, 2017 - Producer

== Touring productions ==
- Evita North American Tour, 2013 Producer
- Beautiful the Carole King Musical First National Tour, 2015 Producer
- A Night With Janis Joplin, 2016 Music Supervisor

== Awards and nominations ==
- Stephen Schwartz's Snapshots: 2022 Grammy Award Nomination for Best Musical Theater Album
- Hadestown: 2019 Tony Award for Best Musical
- Hadestown: 2019 Outer Critics Circle Award for Outstanding New Broadway Musical
- From Broadway With Love: A Benefit Concert for Orlando: 2017 Emmy Award for Audio
- Beautiful the Carole King Musical (Broadway): 2014 Tony Nomination for Best Musical
- Beautiful the Carole King Musical (Broadway): 2014 Drama Desk Nomination for Outstanding Musical
- Beautiful the Carole King Musical Original Broadway Cast Recording: Won Grammy for Best Musical Theater Album
- Beautiful the Carole King Musical (West End): Olivier Nomination for Best New Musical
- On the Town: 2015 Tony Nomination for Best Revival of a Musical
- On the Town: 2015 Drama Desk Nomination for Outstanding Revival of a Musical or Revue

== Discography ==
Release date	Title	Role
January 15, 2013	Norbert Leo Butz - "Memory and Mayhem: Live at 54 Below"	Music Director, Pianist, Vocalist, Producer, Arranger
July 26, 2013	"When I Grow Up Broadway's Next Generation: Live at 54 Below"	Music Director, Pianist, Producer
September 5, 2013	Aaron Tveit - "The Radio In My Head: Live at 54 Below"	Producer, Mixer
September 26, 2013	"Matilda the Musical" Original Broadway Cast Recording	Associate Producer
November 15, 2013	Bebe Neuwirth - "Stories In NYC...: Live at 54 Below"	Producer, Mixer
December 6, 2013	Sierra Boggess - "Awakening Live at 54 Below"	Producer, Mixer
February 7, 2014	"From Broadway with Love: A Benefit Concert for Sandy Hook"	Pianist
March 25, 2014	Jarrod Spector - "A Little Help From My Friends: Live at 54 Below"	Producer, Mixer
June 3, 2014	Ahrens & Flaherty - "Nice Fighting You: Live at 54 Below"	Producer, Mixer
September 9, 2014	Shapiro Sisters - "Live Out Loud: Live at 54 Below"	Music Director, Pianist, Producer
October 19, 2014	"The Angel Band Project: An Evening With Norbert Leo Butz"	Music Director, Pianist, Vocalist
December 15, 2014	"Peter Pan Live!"	Executive Producer
March 3, 2015	"On the Town" New Broadway Cast Recording	Producer, Mixer
May 5, 2015	"Liberty: A Monumental New Musical" Original Off Broadway Cast Recording	Producer, Mixer
May 19, 2015	"Side Show Added Attractions: Live at 54 Below"	Producer
June 23, 2015	Danielle Hope - "Bring the Future Faster: Live at 54 Below"	Producer, Mixer
September 18, 2015	Isabela Moner - "Stopping Time"	Music Director, Pianist, Arrangements, Producer
September 25, 2015	Micky Dolenz - "A Little Bit Broadway A Little Bit Rock and Roll Live at 54 Below"	Producer, Arranger, Piano, Musical Direction, Vocalist
October 23, 2015	Melissa Errico - "What About Today: Live at 54 Below"	Producer, Mixer
January 13, 2016	"The Wiz Live!"	Executive Producer
June 3, 2016	"Bonnie and Clyde and a Whole Lot of Jazz" - Frank Wildhorn and Friends Live at 54 Below	Producer, Mixer
June 17, 2016	"Arlington" Original Cast Recording	Producer
June 17, 2016	Broadway for Orlando, "What The World Needs Now Is Love"	Producer
June 17, 2016	Emily Skinner & Alice Ripley - "Unattached: Live at 54 Below"	Producer
September 9, 2016	Norbert Leo Butz - "Girls Girls Girls Live at 54 Below"	Music Director, Pianist, Vocalist, Arrangements
November 18, 2016	"You’re A Good Man Charlie Brown" 2016 Off Broadway Cast Recording	Producer, Mixer
December 2, 2016	Carmen Cusack - "If You Knew My Story: Live at Feinstein's/54 Below"	Producer, Mixer
December 2, 2016	Charles Busch - "Live at Feinstein's/54 Below"	Producer, Mixer
December 16, 2016	"From Broadway With Love: A Benefit Concert for Orlando" (CD/DVD/Blu-Ray)	Producer, Music Director, Conductor, Mixer, Editor
December 6, 2016	"I Have A Voice: Broadway Kids Against Bullying" - Charity Single	Producer, Music Director, Mixer
January 20, 2017	"A Dog Story" Original Off-Broadway Cast Recording	Producer
January 27, 2017	Shapiro Sisters - "Time Reveals" (EP)	Producer, Mixer
March 23, 2017	Artists for the Arts - "With A Little Help From My Friends" (Single)	Producer, Mixer, Choral Arrangements, Pianist
August 18, 2017	Orfeh & Andy Karl - "Legally Bound: Live at 54 Below"	Producer, Mixer
September 29, 2017	Patti LuPone - "Don't Monkey With Broadway"	Producer, Mixer
May 11, 2018	Lesli Margherita - "Rule Your Kingdom"	Producer, Mixer
September 28, 2018	"Tonya & Nancy: The Rock Opera" Concert Cast Recording	Producer, Mixer
September 28, 2018	"Session Girls" Concert Cast Recording	Music Director, Producer, Mixer
March 1, 2019	Mimi Bessette - "Lullabies of Broadway: Act II"	Piano
Aug 20, 2021	My Marcello - concept recording	Producer

== Philanthropy ==
Michael is active with The Angel Band Project, a non-profit organization that supports victims of sexual assault through music therapy and outreach, both as a music director and board member. He is also active with the No Bully Organization. Michael also produced the track "What the World Needs Now Is Love" for Broadway for Orlando. He played the piano during the live performance of the song on "Maya and Marty" on June 21, 2016. In 2018, Michael served as music director and conductor for "From Broadway with Love: A Benefit Concert for Parkland," a benefit concert following the shooting at Marjory Stoneman Douglas High School.
