= A Night with Janis Joplin =

- Original Broadway Playbill
- Music: Janis Joplin
- Book: Randy Johnson
- Premiere: 10 October 2013: Lyceum Theatre. New York City
- Productions: Original Run; 2013 Broadway; North America Tour; Japanese Tour; 2024 West End

A Night with Janis Joplin is a musical that includes works of singer-songwriter Janis Joplin (1943–1970). Written and directed by Randy Johnson, the show has toured consistently since 2011, with a forthcoming stint at the Peacock Theatre in London beginning on August 20, 2024.

The show mounted at Portland Center Stage from May 24 through June 26, 2011 with Cat Stephani in the lead role, before it traveled for stints at The Allen Theatre at the Cleveland Playhouse, the Mead Center for American Theater, Milkwaukee Repertory Theater, and the Arena Stage in Washington, DC in 2012 with Mary Bridget Davies. One review wrote of the opening night that “Davies not only filled in, she transcended, delivering a performance so raw, real and in-the-moment that it brought people to their feet again and again.”

A Night with Janis Joplin officially opened at the Lyceum Theatre on Broadway on October 10, 2013 and closed in February, after 140 performances. The show was produced by Todd Gershwin and Daniel Chilewich, in association with The Estate of Janis Joplin and Jeffrey Jampol for JAM, Inc.

The Broadway version garnered a Tony Award Nomination for the lead actress Mary Bridget Davies. Davies, who was born in Cleveland, Ohio, has previously played Joplin in the 2005 production of Love, Janis. She has also toured in Europe with Joplin’s original band, Big Brother and the Holding Company.

Post-Broadway, the show traveled through North America beginning in 2015, touring for seven years and making over 130 stops at cities including Toronto, Ontario, Los Angeles, California, Detroit, Michigan, St. Louis, Missouri, Austin, Texas, Atlanta, Georgia and more.

On August 23, 25 and 26 of 2022, the show traveled to Japan for three days of performances at the Tokyo International Forum Hall for an all-Japanese cast helmed by singer Aina the End playing the lead role of Janis Joplin.

In 2023, it was announced that the hit show would move to the West End for a limited-run at the Peacock Theatre in London from August 20 – September 28, 2024 with Mary Bridget Davies returning to star in the lead role.

== Productions ==
Pre-Broadway
Date	City	Venue
May 24 – June 26, 2011	Portland, OR	Portland Center Stage
July 27 – August 19, 2012	Cleveland, OH	The Allen Theatre at the Cleveland Playhouse
September 28 – November 4, 2012	Washington DC	Arena Stage
March 15 – April 21, 2013	Los Angeles, CA	Pasadena Playhouse
May 3 – June 2, 2013	Milwaukee, WI	Milwaukee Repertory Theater
June 21 – August 11, 2013	Washington DC	Arena Stage (second run in DC)
July 10 – August 25, 2013	Austin, TX	Zach’s Topfer Theatre
September 5 – October 6, 2013	San Jose, CA	San Jose Repertory Theater

Broadway
Date	City	Venue
September 20, 2013 – February 9, 2014	New York, NY	Lyceum Theater (140 shows)

North America Tour
Date	City	Venue
July 21 – August 23, 2015	Los Angeles, CA	Pasadena Playhouse (second run)
February 9 - February 21, 2016	Toronto, ON	Panasonic Theatre
February 23, 2016	Hampton, VA	The American Theatre
February 24, 2016	Ridgefield, CT	The Ridgefield Playhouse
February 25, 2016	Morristown, NJ	Mayo PAC
February 26, 2016	New Bedford, MA	Zeiterion PAC
February 27, 2016	Lynn, MA	The Lynn Auditorium
February 28, 2016	Red Bank, NJ	Count Basie Theatre
March 1, 2016	Reading, PA	Santander PAC
March 2, 2016	Cleveland, OH	Palace Theatre
March 3 - March 4th, 2016	Dayton, OH	Victoria Theatre
March 5, 2016	Detroit, MI	Fox Theatre
March 6, 2016	Milwaukee, WI	Pabst Theatre
March 7, 2016	Cedar Rapids, IA	Paramount Theatre
March 9, 2016	Beaver Creek	Vilar PAC
March 10 - March 12, 2016	Fort Collins, CO	Lincoln Center
March 13, 2016	Rapid City, SD	Rushmore Plaza
March 15, 2016	Des Moines, IA	Hoyt Sherman
March 16, 2016	Wichita, KS	Orpheum Arena
March 17 - March 18, 2016	Fayetteville, AR	Riverside Theatre
March 19 - March 20, 2016	St. Louis, MO	Peabody
March 22 - March 27, 2016	Kansas City, MO	Arvest Bank Theatre at The Midland
March 25 – April 17, 2016	Seattle, WA	5th Avenue Theatre (Second company)*
March 29 - April 3, 2016	St. Paul, MN	Ordway Center
April 5 - April 10, 2016	Winnipeg, MB	Burton Cummings
April 11, 2016	Thunder Bay, ON	Thunder Bay Community Aud.
April 13, 2016	Cincinnati, OH	Aronoff Center
April 14, 2016	Durham, NC	DPAC
April 15 - April 16, 2016	Nashville, TN	James K. Polk Theatre
April 17, 2016	Atlanta, GA	Fox Theatre
April 18, 2016	New Orleans, LA	Saenger Theatre
April 20, 2016	Daytona Beach, FL	Peabody Auditorium
April 21, 2016	Jacksonville, FL	Florida Theatre
April 22, 2016	St. Petersburg, FL	Mahaffey Theatre
April 23, 2016	West Palm Beach, FL	Dreyfoos Hall
April 24 , 2016	Charleston, SC	Gillard Center
July 8 - August 7, 2016	Albany, NY	Capital Repertory Theatre (The rep)
August 18 - September 10, 2016	Abingdon, VA	Barter Theatre
August 19 - September 18, 2016	Houston, TX	Alley Theatre
June 7 - July 16, 2017	San Francisco, CA	American Conservatory Theatre
August 16 - September 10, 2017	Laguna Beach, CA	Laguna Playhouse
October 10 - October 29, 2017	Princeton, NJ	McCarter Theatre Center
November 3, 2017	Orillia, ON	Casinorama
November 4, 2017	Windsor, ON	Casino
November 7, 2017	Columbus, OH	Palace Theatre
November 8, 2017	Louisville, KY	Brown Theatre
November 9, 2017	Cleveland, OH	Conor Palace
November 10, 2017	Rosemont, IL	Rosemont Theatre
November 11, 2017	Dixon, IL	Historic Dixon Theatre
November 12, 2017	Madison, WI	Overture Center
November 14, 2017	Huntington, WV	Keith Albee
November 15, 2017	York, PA	Strand-Capitol Performing Arts Theatre
November 16, 2017	Easton, PA	State Theatre
November 17, 2017	Derry, NH	Stockbridge Theatre
November 18, 2017	Springfield, MA	Symphony Hall
November 19, 2017	North Bethesda, MD	Strathmore Theater
January 8, 2018	Sarasota, FL	Van Wezel Performing Arts Hall
January 9, 2018	The Villages, FL	Sharon Morse PAC
January 10, 2018	St. Petersburg, FL	The Mahaffey
January 13, 2018	Ft. Pierce, FL	Sunrise Theatre
January 14, 2018	Ft. Lauderdale, FL	Parker Playhouse
January 17, 2018	Red Bank, NJ	Count Basie Theatre
January 18, 2018	Williamsport, PA	Community Theatre
January 19 - January 20, 2018	Boston, MA	Boch Center
January 23, 2018	Fort Worth, TX	Bass Hall
January 24, 2018	San Antonio, TX	Tobin Center for the Performing Arts
January 25, 2018	Orange, TX	Lutcher Theatre
January 26, 2018	Richardson, TX	Eisemann Center for Performing Arts
January 27, 2018	Midland, TX	Wagner Noel
January 28, 2018	Amarillo, TX	Globe News Center
January 30, 2018	Mankato, MN	Verizon Wireless Center
January 31, 2018	Fairfield, IA	Sondheim Center
February 1, 2018	Wichita, KS	Orpheum
February 2, 2018	Colorado Springs, CO	Pikes Peak Center
February 3, 2018	Denver, CO	Paramount Theatre
February 6, 2018	Tucson, AZ	Fox Theatre
February 7 - February 8, 2018	San Diego, CA	Balboa Theatre
February 9, 2018	Indio, CA	Fantasy Springs Resort
February 11, 2018	Portland, OR	Keller Auditorium
February 13, 2018	Bremerton, WA	Admiral Theatre
February 14, 2018	Spokane, WA	INB Event Center
February 15, 2018	Bellingham, WA	Mt. Baker Theatre
February 17, 2018	Beverly Hills, CA	Saban Theatre
February 18, 2018	Redding, CA	Redding Civic Center
May 4 – May 20, 2018	Raleigh, NC	A.J. Fletcher Opera Theater (21 shows)*
May 3- June 24, 2018	Ivoryton, CT	Ivoryton Playhouse (20 shows)*
September 14 – October 7, 2018	La Mirada, CA	La Mirada Theatre for the Performing Arts*
October 9, 2018	Visalia, CA	Visalia Fox Theatre
October 10, 2018	Merced, CA	The Art Kamangar Center at the Merced Theatre
October 11, 2018	San Rafael, CA	Marin Center
October 16, 2018	Walnut Creek, CA	Lesher Center For the Arts Hofmann Theatre
October 17, 2018	Monterey, CA	Golden State Theatre
October 19, 2018	Redwood City, CA	Fox Theatre
October 20, 2018	Stockton, CA	Bob Hope Theatre
October 21, 2018	Santa Cruz, CA	Santa Cruz Civic Auditorium
October 23, 2018	San Francisco, CA	The Warfield
October 24, 2018	Yountville, CA	Napa Valley Performing Arts Center
October 25, 2018	Fresno, CA	Saroyan Theatre
October 26, 2018	Bakersfield, CA	The Bakersfield Fox Theatre
October 27, 2018	Santa Barbara, CA	Arlington Theater
October 28, 2018	Escondido, CA	California Center for the Arts
September 13, 2019	Beverly, MA	The Cabot
September 14, 2019	Beverly, MA	The Cabot
September 15, 2019	Worcester, MA	Hanover Theatre
September 17, 2019	Lebanon, NH	Lebanon Opera House
September 18, 2019	Red Bank, NJ	Count Basie Center for the Arts
September 19, 2019	Morristown, NJ	Mayo Performing Arts Center
September 20, 2019	New London, CT	Garde Arts Center
September 21, 2019	Kingston, NY	Ulster Performing Arts Center
September 22, 2019	Tarrytown, NY	Tarrytown Music Hall
September 24, 2019	Philadelphia, PA	Kimmel Center for the Performing Arts
September 25, 2019	Washington, DC	Warner Theatre
September 26, 2019	Greensburg, PA	The Palace Theatre
September 27, 2019	Lorain, OH	Lorain Palace
September 28, 2019	Van Wert, OH	Niswonger PAC
September 29, 2019	Detroit, MI	Fox Theatre
September 30, 2019	Pikeville, KY	East Kentucky Expo Center
October 1, 2019	Cincinnati, OH	Aronoff Center
October 3, 2019	Cedar Rapids, IA	Paramount Theatre
October 4, 2019	Champaign, IL	Virginia Theatre
October 5, 2019	Waukegan, IL (Chicago)	Genesee Theatre
October 6, 2019	Prior Lake, MN	Mystic Lake Casino
October 7, 2019	Joliet, IL	Rialto Square Theatre
October 8 - October 9, 2019	St. Louis, MO	Stifel Theatre
October 10, 2019	Richmond, KY	EKU Center for the Arts
October 12, 2019	Overland Park, KS	Yardley Hall
October 13, 2019	Sioux Falls, SD	Orpheum Theater Center
October 15, 2019	Santa Rosa, CA	Luther Burbank Center
October 16, 2019	San Jose, CA	Center for the Performing Arts
October 17, 2019	Pasadena, CA	The Rose
October 18, 2019	Beverly Hills, CA	The Saban
October 20, 2019	San Diego, CA	Balboa Theatre
January 29 – March 8, 2020	Austin, TX	Zach Theatre
May 13 – May 29, 2022	New Orleans, LA	Le Petit Theatre

- March 25 – April 17, 2016: Opening Night March 31st (Previews – March 25,26, 29 & 30)
- May 4 – May 20, 2018: Paige Mcnamara & Francesca Ferrari shared billing
- May 3- June 24, 2018: Paige Mcnamara & Francesca Ferrari shared billing
- September 14 – October 7, 2018: Marie Bridget Davies as lead
- Shows from October 9, 2018 - October 28, 2018: Marie Bridget Davies as lead

Japanese Tour
Date	City	Venue
August 23, 25 & 26, 2022	Tokyo, Japan	Tokyo International Forum Hall A

West End
Date	City	Venue
August 20 – September 28, 2024	London, UK	Peacock Theatre, London

== Critical Response ==
The original Broadway production was met with positive reviews from publications like The Washington Post, The Los Angeles Times, ABC World News Now and more.

Variety Magazine wrote: “It’s a stunning celebration of the blues and those beautiful bruises they leave on a singer’s soul,” while USA Today called it “A dynamic, powerful musical journey back through the late 1960s. Janis Joplin is alive and well in this electrifying Broadway musical. The show features 26 musical numbers precisely paced throughout the show, each building more and more momentum and energy along the incredible journey that is A Night With Janis Joplin.”

The New York Times wrote that A Night with Janis Joplin “Rocks the house with a fervor that is riveting.”

David C. Nichols of the Los Angeles Times wrote: “In a cosmic collusion of persona and perception, this electrifying concert musical resurrects the Queen of Rock ‘n’ Roll with the sort of seismically sensational results normally encountered at stadiums and pop festivals... the premise is basic, unvarnished and supremely effective. Neither venue nor attendees may ever be the same.”

== Characters ==
Included in the show are depictions of Janis Joplin as well as her musical influences: Chantel, Bessie Smith, Nina Simone, Odetta, Etta James and Aretha Franklin.

== Awards & Nominations ==
Association	Year	Category	Nominee	Result
Cleveland Critics Circle Awards	2012	Best Regional Touring Production	-	Nominated
Cleveland Critics Circle Awards	2012	Best Actress	Mary Bridget Davies	Nominated
Cleveland Critics Circle Awards	2012	Best Director	Randy Johnson	Nominated
Broadway World Awards - Cleveland	2012	Best Musical	-	Nominated
Broadway World Awards - Cleveland	2012	Best Director	Randy Johnson	Nominated
Broadway World Awards - Cleveland	2012	Best Actress	Mary Bridget Davies	Nominated
Broadway World Awards - Cleveland	2012	Best Supporting Actress	Sabrina Carten	Nominated
Broadway World Awards - Cleveland	2012	Best Costume Design	Jeff Cone	Nominated
Broadway World Awards - Cleveland	2012	Best Scenic Design	Justin Townsend	Nominated
Broadway World Awards – Washington DC	2012	Best Musical	-	Nominated
Broadway World Awards – Washington DC	2012	Best Director	Randy Johnson	Nominated
Broadway World Awards – Washington DC	2012	Best Actress	Mary Bridget Davies	Nominated
Broadway World Awards – Washington DC	2012	Best Supporting Actress	Sabrina Carten	Nominated
Broadway World Awards – Washington DC	2012	Best Costume Design	Jeff Cone	Nominated
Broadway World Awards – Washington DC	2012	Best Scenic Design	Justin Townsend	Nominated
Helen Hayes Awards	2012	Best Actress	Mary Bridget Davies	Nominated
Helen Hayes Awards	2012	Best Supporting Actress	Sabrina Carten	Nominated
B. Iden Payne Theatre Awards	2013	Best Musical	-	Nominated
B. Iden Payne Theatre Awards	2013	Best Director	Randy Johnson	Nominated
B. Iden Payne Theatre Awards	2013	Best Actress	Kacee Clanton	Nominated
B. Iden Payne Theatre Awards	2013	Best Supporting Actress	Tiffany Mann	Nominated
Austin Critics Table Awards	2013	Best Supporting Actress	Tiffany Mann	Won
Los Angeles Drama Critics Circle	2013	Best Actress	Mary Bridget Davies	Won
Los Angeles Drama Critics Circle	2013	Best Director	Randy Johnson	Won
Los Angeles Drama Critics Circle	2013	Best Supporting Actress	Sabrina Carten	Won
Los Angeles Drama Critics Circle	2013	Best Musical Director	Ross Selgiman	Won
FRED Awards – Pasadena Playhouse	2013	Best Musical	-	Won
FRED Awards – Pasadena Playhouse	2013	Best Director	Randy Johnson	Won
FRED Awards – Pasadena Playhouse	2013	Best Actress	Mary Bridget Davies	Won
NAACP Theatre Awards	2014	Best Supporting Actress	Sabrina Carten	Won
NAACP Theatre Awards	2014	Best Scenic Design	Justin Townsend	Won
NAACP Theatre Awards	2014	Best Musical	-	Won
NAACP Theatre Awards	2014	Best Director	Randy Johnson	Won
NAACP Theatre Awards	2014	Best Costume Design	Jeff Cone	Won
NAACP Theatre Awards	2014	Best Music Direction	Ross Seligman	Won
Broadway World – Best Original Cast Album 2014 New York Drama League	2014	Best Actress in a Musical	Mary Bridget Davies	Nominated
Tony Awards	2014	Best Actress in a Musical	Mary Bridget Davies	Nominated
Bay Area Theatre Awards	2017	Best Musical	-	Won
Bay Area Theatre Awards	2017	Best Ensemble in a Musical	-	Won
Bay Area Theatre Awards	2017	Best Musical Director	Todd Olson	Won
Bay Area Theatre Awards	2017	Best Director	Randy Johnson	Nominated
Bay Area Theatre Awards	2017	Best Leading Actress in a Musical	Kacee Clanton	Nominated
San Francisco Critics Circle	2018	Best Musical Production	-	Nominated
San Francisco Critics Circle	2018	Best Director	-	Nominated
San Francisco Critics Circle	2018	Best Director	-	Nominated
San Francisco Critics Circle	2018	Best Book of a Musical	-	Nominated
San Francisco Critics Circle	2018	Best Actress	-	Nominated
San Francisco Critics Circle	2018	Best Actress	-	Nominated
San Francisco Critics Circle	2018	Best Supporting Actress	-	Nominated
San Francisco Critics Circle	2018	Best Ensemble	-	Nominated
San Francisco Critics Circle	2018	Best Lighting Design	-	Nominated
San Francisco Critics Circle	2018	Best Costume Design	-	Nominated
Los Angeles Ovation Awards	2019	Best Presented Musical	LA Mirada Theatre	Nominated
B. Iden Payne Awards	2019/20	Best Musical	-	Nominated
B. Iden Payne Awards	2019/20	Best Director	-	Nominated
B. Iden Payne Awards	2019/20	Best Book of a Musical	-	Nominated
B. Iden Payne Awards	2019/20	Best Actress	-	Nominated
B. Iden Payne Awards	2019/20	Best Supporting Actress	-	Nominated
B. Iden Payne Awards	2019/20	Best Ensemble	-	Nominated
B. Iden Payne Awards	2019/20	Best Lighting Design	-	Nominated
B. Iden Payne Awards	2019/20	Best Costume Design	-	Nominated
B. Iden Payne Awards	2019/20	Best Musical Direction	-	Nominated

== Director ==
A Night with Janis Joplin was written and directed by Randy Johnson who said of the show: “The remarkable thing about this production is that it has never felt like work. Through Janis and her story so many of our dreams have come true and it truly has been a joyful experience."

== Producers ==
Producers of the original Broadway production include: Daniel Chilewich, Todd Gershwin, Michael Cohl, Jeffrey Jampol, TCG Entertainment LLC, Red Tail Entertainment, Stephen Tenenbaum, Richard Winkler, Michael J. Moritz Jr., Corey Brunish, Brisa Trinchero, Ginger Productions, Bill Ham, Claudio Loureiro, Keith Mardak, Ragovoy Entertainment LLC, Bob & Laurie Wolfe. Neil Kahanovitz, Mike Stoller, Corky Hale Stoller, Darren P. Deverna, Susan DuBow, Tanya Grubich, Jeremiah J. Harris, Jerry Rosenberg, AJ Michaels, Herb Spivak, Red Awning (Executive Producer), and Nicole Kastrinos (Executive Producer).
