= Jackie DeShannon =

American singer-songwriter (born 1941)

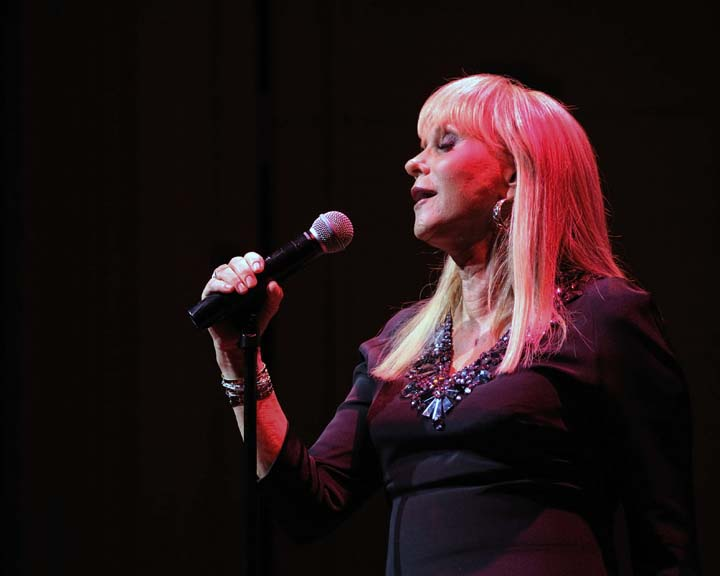
- DeShannon performing at the Library of Congress in Washington D.C., May 2011

Background information
- Born: Sharon Lee Myers; August 21, 1941 (age 85); Hazel, Kentucky, U.S.
- Genres: Pop rock; rock and roll; rockabilly; folk rock; country
- Occupations: Singer-songwriter; broadcaster; actress
- Instruments: Vocals; guitar
- Years active: 1955–present
- Labels: Liberty; Imperial; Atlantic
- Spouses: Irving V. Dain (m. 1966; ann. 1967); Randy Edelman (m. 1976)
- Known for: What the World Needs Now Is Love; Put a Little Love in Your Heart; When You Walk in the Room; Bette Davis Eyes
- Website: jackiedeshannon.com

Jackie DeShannon (born Sharon Lee Myers; August 21, 1941) is an American singer-songwriter, radio broadcaster and actress who has had many hit song credits beginning in the 1960s, as both a singer and composer. She was one of the first female singer-songwriters of the rock and roll period. She is most notable as the singer of "What the World Needs Now Is Love" and "Put a Little Love in Your Heart". She is the writer of "When You Walk in the Room" and "Bette Davis Eyes", which became hits for The Searchers and Kim Carnes, respectively.

Since 2009, DeShannon has been an entertainment broadcast correspondent reporting Beatles band members' news for the radio program Breakfast with the Beatles.

== Early life and education ==
Sharon Lee Myers was born in Hazel south of Murray, Kentucky, the daughter of parents who were farmers and musically inclined, James Erwin Myers and Sandra Jeanne LaMonte. By age six, Sharon was singing country tunes on a local radio show. By the age of 11, she was hosting her own radio program. After life on the farm became too difficult, the family moved from Murray, to the Fox River Valley in Illinois in the early 1950s, first to her mother's hometown of Aurora, Illinois, where her father continued his career as a barber, and then (in 1952) to nearby Batavia, Illinois, to the north, where Sherry Lee (as she called herself) attended high school.

In May 1955 while in 8th grade, Sharon Myers, then 13 years old, was featured in the local newspaper for her vocal talents and personal appearances at community gatherings, the local hospitals, and for assorted organizations. According to the Batavia Herald, she had her own Saturday morning radio show Breakfast Melodies on radio station WMRO in Aurora. Further:

Though only 13, the youngster can boast almost 11 years of voice training and experience and in the past she has toured most of the south making personal appearances. Also she has sung on radio with a rhythm band for 2 years and has appeared on television 3 times.

In March 1956, "Sherry Lee Myers" made "another guest appearance on Pee Wee King's popular Country and Western Television Show" on Saturday evening, March 3, on Channel 2—the CBS network affiliate in Chicago. The Batavia Herald wrote:

Sherry Lee is a busy young lady. Each Saturday morning at 9:30 she is on the WMRO radio show. She had made appearances with the Pee Wee King Show at Ottawa, Rockford and La Salle in recent weeks. Following her television appearance this Saturday night, the young Batavia artist will appear at the West Aurora Junior High School auditorium on Sunday, March 4th for three shows, 2, 4, and 8 pm.

She attended Batavia High School in Batavia for two years (1955–1957), leaving school after her second year.

== Early career ==
She began to record under various names such as Sherry Lee, Jackie Dee, and Jackie Shannon with mixed success. Billboard noted (June 10, 1957) that Sherry Lee Myers, "16-year-old C&W singer of Batavia, Illinois," had recently signed to George Goldner's Gone label in New York as a rockabilly artist, and that her "handlers" (Irving Schacht and Paul Kallett) had changed her name to Jackie Dee.

Her only release on Gone included "I'll Be True" (A) and "How Wrong I Was" (B), which appeared in both 78 rpm and 45 rpm versions. Myers almost certainly sang these songs at the Uptown Theater in Philadelphia on July 3, 1957, and at the Paramount Theater in New York, two weeks later, with Alan Freed's Big Rock 'n' Roll Show. However, her interpretations of country songs "Buddy" (as Jackie Dee) and "Trouble" (as Jackie Shannon) gained the attention of rock and roll star Eddie Cochran, who arranged for her to travel to California to meet his girlfriend, singer-songwriter Sharon Sheeley, who formed a writing partnership with DeShannon in 1960. Their partnership produced Brenda Lee's hits "Dum Dum" and "Heart in Hand".

In 1960, DeShannon signed with Liberty Records, adopting the name Jackie DeShannon, believed to be the name of an Irish ancestor, after executives at Liberty thought the name Sharon Myers would not help sell records. In a Fresh Air interview (June 14, 2010), DeShannon said that she chose "Jackie" since she had a low singing voice and could be heard as either male or female. When she found that "Jackie Dee" was too similar to Brenda Lee, Sandra Dee, et al., she changed it to Jackie Dee Shannon, which people heard as DeShannon. The name stuck.

Using her new name as a performer, she made the WLS Chicago radio survey with the single "Lonely Girl" in late 1960. A string of mostly flop singles followed, although "The Prince" bubbled under at No. 108 in the United States in early 1962, and "Faded Love" became her first US Billboard Top 100 entry, squeaking in at No. 97 in February 1963. She fared better with the Sonny Bono-Jack Nitzsche song "Needles and Pins" and the self-penned "When You Walk in the Room" later in 1963. Both reached the lower rungs of the US pop chart, but were Top 40 hits in Canada, where "Needles and Pins" made it all the way to No. 1. "Needles and Pins" and "When You Walk in the Room" later became US and UK hits for The Searchers. A version of "When You Walk in the Room" by Pam Tillis topped the country chart in 1994, and the song was also recorded by ex-Byrds member Chris Hillman in 1998 and by ex-ABBA vocalist Agnetha Fältskog in 2004.

DeShannon recorded many other singles that encompassed teen pop, country ballads, rockabilly, gospel, and Ray Charles-style soul that did not fare as well on the charts. During these years it was her songwriting and public profile rather than her recording career that kept her contracted to Liberty. DeShannon dated Elvis Presley and formed friendships with The Everly Brothers and Ricky Nelson. She also co-starred and sang with Bobby Vinton in the 1964 teen surf movie Surf Party.

DeShannon's biggest break came in 1964 when she supported The Beatles on their first US tour, and formed a touring band with guitarist Ry Cooder. DeShannon co-wrote "Breakaway" with Sharon Sheeley, which was recorded by Irma Thomas in 1964, and by Tracey Ullman in 1983. She also wrote "Don't Doubt Yourself Babe" for Mr. Tambourine Man, the 1965 debut album of The Byrds. Her music at this stage was heavily influenced by the American West Coast sounds and folk music. Staying briefly in England in 1965, DeShannon formed a songwriting partnership with Jimmy Page, which resulted in the songs "Dream Boy" and "Don't Turn Your Back on Me" (covered, among others, by the British band Mike Sheridan's Lot in 1965). DeShannon also wrote material for singer Marianne Faithfull, including her Top Ten UK and US hit "Come and Stay With Me", which became Faithfull's biggest UK hit, peaking at No. 4 in 1965. In the same year, Cher recorded the song on her solo debut album All I Really Want to Do. Three years later DeShannon recorded the song for herself, on her Laurel Canyon album in 1968. She also appeared on the British television show Ready Steady Go!

== Hit love songs ==
Moving to New York City, DeShannon co-wrote with Randy Newman, producing such songs as "She Don't Understand Him Like I Do" and "Did He Call Today Mama?", as well as writing "You Have No Choice" for Delaney Bramlett. In March 1965, DeShannon recorded Burt Bacharach and Hal David's "What the World Needs Now Is Love", which led to club tours and regular appearances on television and went to No. 7 on the US chart and No. 1 in Canada. (DeShannon's recording of the song was later used in the 1969 film Bob & Carol & Ted & Alice). She appeared in the 1967 film C'mon, Let's Live a Little, with Bobby Vee, as a folk singer.

In 1969, she scored her next smash single and album, both entitled "Put a Little Love in Your Heart". The self-penned single (co-written with her brother, Randy Myers and Jimmy Holiday) sold over one million copies, and was awarded a gold disc. "Put a Little Love in Your Heart" was performed as the closing number at the Music for UNICEF Concert, broadcast worldwide from the United Nations General Assembly in 1979, and was covered in 1988 as a duet by Annie Lennox and Al Green (reaching No. 9 in the Billboard Hot 100), and by Dolly Parton in 1993. The single "Love Will Find a Way" from the same album was also a moderate hit.

== Later career ==
Switching to Atlantic Records in 1970 and moving to Los Angeles, DeShannon recorded the critically acclaimed albums Jackie (1972) and Your Baby Is a Lady (1974), but they failed to produce the same commercial success as her previous releases. In 1973, she was invited by Van Morrison to sing on his album Hard Nose the Highway, singing backup on both the title track and "Warm Love". (DeShannon and Morrison co-wrote the song "Santa Fe," which appeared on Morrison's 1978 album Wavelength.)

In 1974, DeShannon released New Arrangement for Columbia Records. She co-wrote four songs on the album with Donna Weiss, including "Queen of the Rodeo" and "Bette Davis Eyes". The latter became a worldwide No. 1 single for Kim Carnes in 1981, earning Weiss and DeShannon the 1982 Grammy Award for Song of the Year. DeShannon released You're the Only Dancer in 1977 and a single from that album, "Don't Let The Flame Burn Out", was a minor hit, reaching No. 65 in the Billboard Hot 100.

DeShannon continued to record. She released You Know Me, an album of original songs, for Varèse Sarabande in 2000, and When You Walk in the Room, a new recording of her best-known songs, in 2011. She was portrayed by singer Liz Phair in an episode of American Dreams. On June 17, 2010, DeShannon was inducted into the Songwriters Hall of Fame.

In 2012 she wrote and recorded "For Africa, In Africa", a song inspired by the urgent need for action to provide clean water for the African Continent. Using her continuing access and friendship with Paul McCartney and Ringo Starr, DeShannon has appeared as a contributing entertainment broadcast correspondent reporting historical anecdotes and current touring and personal news and publicity pertaining to the two surviving Beatles for Breakfast with the Beatles on Sirius XM Satellite Radio on the weekends since October 2009.

== Personal life ==
In the mid-1960s, DeShannon was a companion of Jimmy Page and dated Love guitarist Bryan MacLean. It is likely that Page wrote the song "Tangerine" (which appeared on the third Led Zeppelin album) after the breakup of his relationship with DeShannon in early 1965.

Her first husband was Liberty Records executive Irving V. "Bud" Dain, whom she married on January 29, 1966 (it was annulled in 1967). DeShannon has been married to singer-songwriter and film composer Randy Edelman since 1976. They have a son.

She had a brother, Randy James Myers (1947–2021) and sometimes wrote songs with him.

== Discography ==
=== Albums ===
- Jackie DeShannon (1963)
- Breakin' It Up on the Beatles Tour (1964)
- Don't Turn Your Back on Me (1964)
- This Is Jackie DeShannon (1965)
- In the Wind (1965)
- Are You Ready for This? (1966)
- New Image (1967)
- For You (1967)
- Me About You (1968)
- Laurel Canyon (1968)
- Put a Little Love in Your Heart (1969) US Billboard No. 81
- To Be Free (1970)
- Songs (1971)
- Jackie (1972) US Billboard No. 196
- Your Baby Is a Lady (1974)
- New Arrangement (1975)
- You're the Only Dancer (1977) US Billboard No. 203
- Quick Touches (1978)
- You Know Me (2000)
- When You Walk in the Room (2011, songs newly recorded)

=== Soundtrack appearances ===
- Surf Party (1964, 2 songs)
- C'mon, Let's Live a Little (1966, 3 songs)
- Together? (1979, 3 songs)

=== Compilations ===
- You Won't Forget Me (1965, compilation)
- What the World Needs Now Is Love (1968, compilation)
- Lonely Girl (1968, compilation)
- Great Performances (1968, compilation)
- The Very Best of Jackie DeShannon (1975, compilation)
- Pop Princess (1981, compilation)
- Jackie DeShannon (1985, compilation)
- What the World Needs Now Is ...: The Definitive Collection (1994, compilation)
- Good as Gold! (1990, compilation)
- The Best of Jackie DeShannon (1991, compilation)
- Trouble with Jackie Dee (1991)
- The Early Years (1998, compilation)
- Come and Get Me: Best of... 1958–1980 (2000, compilation)
- High Coinage: The Songwriters Collection 1960–1984 (2007, compilation)
- You Won't Forget Me: The Complete Liberty Singles (Volume 1) (2009, UK compilation)
- Come and Get Me: The Complete Liberty and Imperial Singles (Volume 2) (2011, UK compilation)
- Keep Me in Mind: The Complete Imperial and Liberty Singles, Volume 3 (2012, UK compilation)
- All the Love: The Lost Atlantic Recordings (2015, previously unreleased 1971 album)
- Stone Cold Soul: The Complete Capitol Recordings (2018, compilation)

=== Singles ===
Images of each record from 1956 to 1960, including additional liner notes, are found at "Sweet Sherry: The Early Recording Career of Jackie DeShannon" by Pete Lerner.

Year	Single (A-side, B-side) Both sides from same album except where indicated	Peak chart positions					Album
Year	Single (A-side, B-side) Both sides from same album except where indicated	US BB Hot 100	US CB	US AC	CAN	CAN AC	Album
1956	"I'm Crazy Darling" b/w "Baby Honey"	—	—	—	—	—	Non-album tracks (as Sherry Lee)
1957	"I'll Be True" b/w "How Wrong I Was"	—	—	—	—	—	Non-album tracks (as Jackie Dee)
1958	"Buddy" b/w "Strolypso Dance"	—	—	—	—	—	Non-album tracks (as Jackie Dee)
1958	"Just Another Lie" b/w "Cajun Blues"	—	—	—	—	—	Non-album tracks (as Jackie Shannon)
1959	"Lies" b/w "Trouble"	—	—	—	—	—	Non-album tracks (as Jackie Shannon)
1960	"So Warm (This Is How I Feel)" b/w "Young Girl's Prayer" (first pressings) "I Wanna Go Home" (later pressings)	—	—	—	—	—	Non-album tracks
1960	"Put My Baby Down" b/w "The Foolish One"	—	—	—	—	—	Non-album tracks
1960	"Teach Me" b/w "Lonely Girl" (from Lonely Girl)	—	—	—	—	—	Non-album tracks
1961	"Think About You" b/w "Heaven Is Being with You" (non-album track)	—	—	—	—	—	Lonely Girl
1961	"Wish I Could Find a Boy (Just Like You)" b/w "I Won't Turn You Down"	—	—	—	—	—	Non-album tracks
1961	"Baby (When Ya Kiss Me)" b/w "Ain't That Love"	—	—	—	—	—	Non-album tracks
1962	"The Prince" b/w "I'll Drown in My Own Tears" (non-album track)	108	—	—	—	—	Breakin' It Up on the Beatles Tour!
1962	"Just Like in the Movies" b/w "Guess Who"	—	—	—	—	—	Non-album tracks
1962	"You Won't Forget Me" b/w "I Don't Think So Much of Myself Now" (non-album track)	—	104	—	—	—	Breakin' It Up on the Beatles Tour!
1962	"Faded Love" b/w "Dancing Silhouettes"	97	144	—	—	—	Non-album tracks
1963	"Needles and Pins" b/w "Did He Call Today, Mama?"	84	58	—	1	—	Breakin' It Up on the Beatles Tour!
1963	"Little Yellow Roses" b/w "Oh Sweet Chariot"	110	108	—	32	—	Jackie DeShannon
1963	"When You Walk in the Room" b/w "Till You Say You'll Be Mine" (non-album track)	99	81	—	26	—	Breakin' It Up on the Beatles Tour!
1964	"Should I Cry" b/w "I'm Gonna Be Strong" (from This Is Jackie DeShannon) cancelled single	—	—	—	—	—	Breakin' It Up on the Beatles Tour!
1964	"Oh Boy" b/w "I'm Looking for Someone to Love" (non-album track)	112	133	—	—	—	Breakin' It Up on the Beatles Tour!
1964	"Hold Your Head High" b/w "She Don't Understand Him Like I Do"	—	—	—	—	—	Breakin' It Up on the Beatles Tour!
1964	"He's Got the Whole World in His Hands" b/w "It's Love Baby (24 Hours a Day)"	—	—	—	—	—	Breakin' It Up on the Beatles Tour!
1965	"What the World Needs Now Is Love" b/w "I Remember the Boy"	7	8	—	1	—	This Is Jackie DeShannon
1965	"A Lifetime of Loneliness" b/w "Don't Turn Your Back on Me" (from In the Wind)	66	72	—	—	—	This Is Jackie DeShannon
1966	"Come and Get Me" b/w "Splendor in the Grass" (from Me About You)	83	99	—	82	—	Non-album track
1966	"Are You Ready for This" b/w "Will You Love Me Tomorrow" cancelled single	—	—	—	—	—	Are You Ready for This
1966	"Windows and Doors" b/w "So Long Johnny"	108	147	—	—	—	Are You Ready for This
1966	"I Can Make It with You" b/w "To Be Myself"	68	87	—	—	—	Are You Ready for This
1967	"Come On Down (From the Top of That Hill)" b/w "Find Me Love" (from Are You Ready for This)	121	147	—	—	—	New Image
1967	"The Wishing Doll" b/w "Where Does the Sun Go"	—	—	—	—	—	New Image
1967	"I Haven't Got Anything Better to Do" both sides, promotional single only	—	—	—	—	—	New Image
1967	"It's All in the Game" b/w "Changin' My Mind"	110	—	—	—	—	For You
1968	"Me About You" b/w "I Keep Wanting You"	119	113	—	—	—	Me About You
1968	"Nobody's Home to Go Home to" b/w "Nicole"	—	—	—	—	—	Me About You
1968	"Didn't Want to Have to Do It" b/w "Splendor in the Grass" cancelled single	—	—	—	—	—	Me About You
1968	"The Weight" b/w "Splendor in the Grass" (first pressings, from Me About You) "Effervescent Blue" (later pressings, non-album track)	55	35	—	35	—	Laurel Canyon
1968	"Laurel Canyon" b/w "Holly Would"	—	—	—	—	—	Laurel Canyon
1969	"Trust Me" b/w "What Is This"	—	—	—	—	—	Non-album tracks
1969	"Put a Little Love in Your Heart" b/w "Always Together"	4	4	2	12	2	Put a Little Love in Your Heart
1969	"Love Will Find a Way" b/w "I Let Go Completely"	40	33	11	17	16	Put a Little Love in Your Heart
1969	"Do You Know How Christmas Trees Are Grown" b/w "Christmas"	—	—	—	—	—	Non-album tracks
1970	"Brighton Hill" b/w "You Can Come to Me" (from Put a Little Love in Your Heart)	82	52	9	47	7	To Be Free
1970	"You Keep Me Hangin' On"/"Hurt So Bad" b/w "What Was Your Day Like"	96	101	—	—	—	To Be Free
1970	"It's So Nice" b/w "Mediterranean Sky"	84	92	—	—	—	To Be Free
1971	"Keep Me Warm" b/w "Salinas"	—	—	—	—	—	Songs
1971	"Stone-Cold Soul" b/w "West Virginia Mine" (from Songs)	—	—	—	—	—	Non-album track
1972	"Vanilla Olay" / "Only Love Can Break Your Heart"	76 —	95; 96	21; 38	54; 90	12 —	Jackie
1972	"Paradise" b/w "I Wanna Roo You"	110	—	33	—	—	Jackie
1972	"Chains on My Soul (I Won't Try to Put Chains on Your Soul)" b/w "Peaceful in My Soul"	—	—	—	—	—	Jackie
1973	"Sweet Sixteen" b/w "Speak Out to Me"	—	—	—	—	—	Non-album tracks
1973	"Your Baby Is a Lady" b/w "(If You Never Have a Big Hit Record); You're Still Gonna Be My Star"	—	—	—	—	—	Your Baby Is a Lady
1974	"Jimmie, Just Sing Me One More Song" b/w "You've Changed"	—	—	—	—	—	Your Baby Is a Lady
1975	"Let the Sailors Dance" b/w "Boat to Sail"	—	—	—	—	—	New Arrangement
1976	"All Night Desire" b/w "Fire in the City"	—	—	—	—	—	Non-album tracks
1977	"Don't Let the Flame Burn Out" b/w "I Don't Think I Can Wait"	68	70	20	81	4	You're the Only Dancer
1978	"To Love Somebody" b/w "Just to Feel This Love from You"	—	—	44	94	—	You're the Only Dancer
1978	"You're the Only Dancer" b/w "Tonight You're Doin' It Right"	—	—	—	—	—	You're the Only Dancer
1978	"Things We Said Today" b/w "Way Above the Angels"	—	—	35	—	—	Quick Touches
1980	"I Don't Need You Anymore" b/w "Find Love"	86	—	—	—	—	Together? (soundtrack)
"—" denotes releases that did not chart

== Film appearances ==
- Surf Party (1963)
- Intimacy (1966)
- C'mon Let's Live a Little (1967)

== TV appearances ==
- Hollywood a Go Go (1965)
- Hullabaloo (1965)
- My Three Sons (1967)
- Playboy After Dark (1969)
- The Wild Wild West (1969) (The Night of the Janus)
- The Ed Sullivan Show (1969)
- The Johnny Cash Show (1970)
- Flip Wilson Show (1970)
- The Virginian (1970)
- The Catcher (1972)
- The Midnight Special (1976)
- Later... with Jools Holland, Series 41, Episode 6, BBC TWO (2012)
