= Broadway for Orlando =

Charitable initiative for the Orlando nightclub shooting survivors

Broadway for Orlando is a charitable initiative to provide support to the victims of the Orlando nightclub shooting.

== History ==
Founded in June 2016 by Broadway Records, it sponsored a re-recording of Hal David's and Burt Bacharach's 1965 song, What the World Needs Now, sung by an all-star cast of Broadway artists. The organization is committing to donate 100% of the proceeds from the sale of this recording to the GLBT Community Center of Central Florida.

The idea was conceived by James Wesley. Seth Rudetsky served as music director. Michael J. Moritz Jr. and Michael Croiter produced the track. The track was released by Broadway Records.

== List of artists ==
According to the Broadway for Orlando website, artists participating in the recording included:

- Sara Bareilles
- Kristen Bell
- Wayne Brady
- Matthew Broderick
- Andréa Burns
- Ann Hampton Callaway
- Liz Callaway
- Len Cariou
- Paul Castree
- Michael Cerveris
- Joshua Colley
- Lilla Crawford
- Carmen Cusack
- Darius de Haas
- Fran Drescher
- Gloria Estefan
- Kimiko Glenn
- Whoopi Goldberg
- Renée Elise Goldsberry
- Joel Grey
- Sean Hayes
- Nina Hennessy
- James Monroe Iglehart
- Julie James
- Carole King
- Judy Kuhn
- Nathan Lane
- Anika Larsen
- Zachary Levi
- Jose Llana
- Rebecca Luker
- Andrea Martin
- Audra McDonald
- Idina Menzel
- Janet Metz
- Lin-Manuel Miranda
- Brian Stokes Mitchell
- Jessie Mueller
- Donna Murphy
- Rosie O’Donnell
- Kelli O’Hara
- Rory O’Malley
- Orfeh
- Sarah Jessica Parker
- Christine Pedi
- Rosie Perez
- Bernadette Peters
- Billy Porter
- Alice Ripley
- Chita Rivera
- Seth Rudetsky
- Keala Settle
- Kate Shindle
- Jennifer Simard
- Will Swenson
- Rachel Tucker
- Tommy Tune
- Jonah Verdon
- James Wesley
- Juli Wesley
- Lillias White
- Edith Windsor
- Marissa Jaret Winokur
- BD Wong
- Tony Yazbeck

The recording was made available on iTunes as well as on the Broadway Records website.

The group subsequently performed the single on the June 21, 2016 episode of Maya & Marty with slight changes in the cast. The ensemble on the broadcast included:

- Roger Bart
- Steven Boyer
- Charles Busch
- Ann Hampton Callaway
- Liz Callaway
- Len Cariou
- Paul Castree
- Michael Cerveris
- Kevin Chamberlin
- Josh Colley
- Lilla Crawford
- Carmen Cusack
- Darius de Haas
- Carole Demas
- Fran Drescher
- Cynthia Erivo
- Brian G. Gallagher
- Victor Garber
- Frankie Grande
- Joel Grey
- Sean Hayes
- Megan Hilty
- Christopher Scott Icenogle
- Bill Irwin
- Julie James
- Judy Kuhn
- Anika Larsen
- Liz Larsen
- Norm Lewis
- Jose Llana
- Lorna Luft
- Beth Malone
- Andrea Martin
- Janet Metz
- Brian Stokes Mitchell
- Debra Monk
- Jessie Mueller
- Lacretta Nicole
- Kelli O'Hara
- Rory O'Malley
- Orfeh
- Laura Osnes
- Christine Pedi
- Rosie Perez
- Billy Porter
- Alice Ripley
- Chita Rivera
- Seth Rudetsky
- Maya Rudolph
- Keala Settle
- Marc Shaiman
- Kate Shindle
- Martin Short
- Jennifer Simard
- Kenan Thompson
- Rachel Tucker
- Jonah Verdon
- Max Von Essen
- James Wesley
- Juli Wesley
- Lillias White
- Marissa Jaret Winokur
- BD Wong
- Tony Yazbeck

The group performed on July 27, 2016 at the 2016 Democratic National Convention with the following cast:

- Kristen Bell
- Stephanie J. Block
- Ann Hampton Callaway
- Liz Callaway
- Len Cariou
- Michelle Collins
- Jon Viktor Corpuz
- Darren Criss
- Wilson Cruz
- Carmen Cusack
- Tyne Daly
- Van Dean
- Darius de Haas
- Lena Hall
- Melissa Errico
- Nicholas Callaway Foster
- Sharon Gless
- Montego Glover
- Mary Ann Hu
- Richard Kind
- Anika Larsen
- Michael Longoria
- Audra McDonald
- Idina Menzel
- Olga Merediz
- Debra Messing
- Janet Metz
- Brian Stokes Mitchell
- Rosie Perez
- Eve Plumb
- Alice Ripley
- Seth Rudetsky
- Roz Ryan
- Margaret Stallings
- Michael Urie
- Ben Vereen
- Adrienne Warren
- James Wesley
- Juli Wesley
- Tom Wopat
