= You Won't Forget Me: The Complete Liberty Singles (Volume 1) =

Compilation album by Jackie DeShannon
- Released: 2009
- Label: Ace

You Won't Forget Me: The Complete Liberty Singles (Volume 1) is a compilation CD by Jackie DeShannon, released in the UK by Ace Records as catalog number CDCHD-1243 in 2009. This release is a comprehensive collection of the A and B sides of all DeShannon's singles released in the United States on Liberty Records from 1960 through 1965.

Note: "When You Walk In the Room" was also issued in 1964 as the A-side on the Liberty Records single #55735. The B-side was "Over You." Liberty Records also planned to release DeShannon's next single as #55787 pairing two Burt Bacharach compositions, "What the World Needs Now Is Love" and "A Lifetime of Loneliness". This single was cancelled and DeShannon was moved to the company's Imperial Records label. These two tracks were then split and released as two separate single releases.

Record Collector assigned it a rating of three stars.

== Track listing ==
No.	Title	Length
1.	"Teach Me"	2:43
2.	"Lonely Girl"	2:12
3.	"Heaven Is Being With You"	2:13
4.	"Think About You"	1:52
5.	"Wish I Could Find a Boy (Just Like You)"	2:13
6.	"I Won't Turn You Down"	2:16
7.	"Ain't That Love"	2:14
8.	"Baby (When Ya Kiss Me)"	2:17
9.	"The Prince"	2:34
10.	"That's What Boys Are Made Of" (cancelled)	2:04
11.	"I'll Drown In My Own Tears"	2:24
12.	"Just Like In the Movies"	2:30
13.	"Guess Who"	2:26
14.	"You Won't Forget Me"	2:15
15.	"I Don't Think So Much Of Myself Now"	2:01
16.	"Faded Love"	3:03
17.	"Dancing Silhouettes"	2:28
18.	"Needles and Pins"	2:32
19.	"Did He Call Today, Mama?"	2:15
20.	"Little Yellow Roses"	2:00
21.	"Oh, Sweet Chariot"	2:33
22.	"500 Miles" (cancelled)	2:47
23.	"Till You Say You'll Be Mine"	2:31
24.	"When You Walk In the Room"	2:39
25.	"Should I Cry" (cancelled)	2:33
26.	"I'm Gonna Be Strong" (cancelled)	2:08
Total length:		63:38
