= Breakin' It Up on the Beatles Tour! =

Breakin' It Up On the Beatles Tour!

Compilation album by Jackie DeShannon
- Released: 1964
- Genre: Pop rock
- Label: Liberty
- Producer: Dick Glasser, Jackie DeShannon

Jackie DeShannon chronology
Jackie DeShannon (1963)	Breakin' It Up On the Beatles Tour! (1964)	This Is Jackie DeShannon (1965)

Professional ratings
Review scores
Source	Rating
AllMusic	4/5 stars
Record Collector	4/5 stars

Breakin' It Up On the Beatles Tour is an LP album by Jackie DeShannon, released by Liberty Records under catalog number LRP-3390 as a monophonic recording in 1964, and later in stereo under catalog number LST-7390 the same year. Contrary to what the title says, this LP was not recorded during a Beatles tour. DeShannon was an opening act on their 1964 North American tour, but the LP is a collection of a dozen tracks that had already been released on Liberty singles between 1962 and 1964.

In 2005 RPM Records rereleased the album with eight bonus tracks.

== Track listing ==
No.	Title	Writer(s)	Length
1.	"Needles and Pins"	Jack Nitzsche, Sonny Bono	2:40
2.	"She Don't Understand Him Like I Do"	DeShannon, Randy Newman	3:12
3.	"Should I Cry"	Jack Nitzsche, DeShannon	2:28
4.	"Did He Call Today, Mama?"	Randy Newman	2:13
5.	"You Won't Forget Me"	DeShannon, Sharon Sheeley	2:12
6.	"Hold Your Head High"	DeShannon, Randy Newman	2:42
7.	"When You Walk in the Room"	DeShannon	2:39
8.	"The Prince"	DeShannon, Sharon Sheeley	2:36
9.	"Oh, Boy"	Bill Tilghman, Sonny West	1:50
10.	"He's Got the Whole World in His Hands"	Traditional; adapted by Dick Glasser	2:21
11.	"It's Love Baby (24 Hours a Day)"	Ted Jarrett	2:29
12.	"Over You"	Allen Julian Orange, Clarence Toussaint	2:01

Bonus tracks (2005 CD reissue)
No.	Title	Writer(s)	Length
13.	"Til You Say You'll Be Mine"	Jackie DeShannon
14.	"I'm Looking For Someone To Love"	Buddy Holly, Norman Petty
15.	"Mean Old Frisco"	Arthur Crudup
16.	"Today Will Have No Night"	Jackie DeShannon, Sharon Sheeley
17.	"Give Me A Break"	Jackie DeShannon
18.	"Maybe Baby"	Buddy Holly, Norman Petty
19.	"Try To Forget Him"	Jackie DeShannon
20.	"Breakaway"	Jackie DeShannon, Sharon Sheeley
