= In the Wind (Jackie DeShannon album) =

Studio album by Jackie DeShannon
- Released: 1965
- Genre: Pop
- Length: 31:59
- Label: Imperial

Jackie DeShannon chronology
This Is Jackie DeShannon (1965)	In the Wind (1965)	You Won't Forget Me (1966)

In the Wind is the fifth studio album by American singer-songwriter Jackie DeShannon, released by Imperial Records under catalog number LP-9296 as a monophonic recording in 1965, and later in stereo under catalog number LP-12296 the same year. It was arranged by Jack Nitzsche.

== Track listing ==
Track	Song	Writer(s)	Time
1	"Blowin' in the Wind"	Bob Dylan	3:08
2	"Walkin' Down the Line"	Bob Dylan	2:45
3	"Don't Think Twice, It's Alright"	Bob Dylan	3:28
4	"If I Had a Hammer"	Lee Hays, Pete Seeger	2:21
5	"Jailer, Bring Me Water"	Bobby Darin	2:30
6	"Baby, Let Me Follow You Down"	Eric Von Schmidt	1:55
7	"Needles and Pins"	Jack Nitzsche, Sonny Bono	2:39
8	"Little Yellow Roses"	Trevor Peacock	2:03
9	"500 Miles"	Hedy West	2:50
10	"Oh Sweet Chariot"	Arranged by DeShannon	2:37
11	"Puff the Magic Dragon"	Leonard Lipton, Peter Yarrow	3:26
12	"Don't Turn Your Back On Me"	DeShannon	2:17
