= What the World Needs Now Is ...: The Definitive Collection =

What the World Needs Now is...

Compilation album by Jackie DeShannon
- Released: 1994
- Label: Capitol

What the World Needs Now is...Jackie DeShannon is a compilation CD by Jackie DeShannon, released by Capitol Records as catalog number 829786 in 1994. These tracks are culled from the vaults of her tenure at Liberty Records. It was rated 4.5 stars by AllMusic.

== Track listing ==
Track	Song	Time
1	"Buddy"	1:55
2	"Heaven Is Being With You"	2:20
3	"You Won't Forget Me"	2:18
4	"Needles and Pins" (unedited)	3:00
5	"Hellos and Goodbyes"	2:17
6	"When You Walk in the Room" (unedited)	3:06
7	"Till You Say You'll Be Mine"	2:41
8	"Breakaway" (previously unreleased)	2:15
9	"Should I Cry" (alternate take)	2:19
10	"I Remember the Boy"	3:34
11	"Dream Boy" (previously unreleased)	2:17
12	"Don't Turn Your Back On Me"	2:14
13	"What the World Needs Now is Love"	3:14
14	"A Lifetime of Loneliness"	2:35
15	"Come and Get Me"	2:40
16	"Splendor In the Grass" (version 1)	2:23
17	"For Granted" (from the film 'C'Mon, Let's Live a Little')	2:52
18	"Windows and Doors"	2:47
19	"I Can Make It With You"	3:01
20	"500 Miles from Yesterday"	3:25
21	"Where Does the Sun Go?"	3:16
22	"It Shines On You" (previously unreleased)	2:42
23	"Reason to Believe" (previously unreleased)	3:00
24	"The Weight"	3:00
25	"Come and Stay With Me"	3:09
26	"Put a Little Love in Your Heart"	2:35
27	"Love Will Find a Way"	2:36
28	"Brighton Hill"	2:27
29	"Laurel Canyon" (album advertisement)	0:59
30	"Put a Little Love in Your Heart" (album advertisement)	1:03
