= Put a Little Love in Your Heart (album) =

Studio album by Jackie DeShannon
- Released: 1969
- Studio: Sunwest (Hollywood, California)
- Genre: Pop
- Length: 32:13
- Label: Imperial
- Producer: VME Productions (George Vitale, Sam Russell, and Dargin McWhorter)

Jackie DeShannon chronology
Laurel Canyon (1969)	Put a Little Love in Your Heart (1969)	To Be Free (1970)

Singles from Put a Little Love in Your Heart
- 1. "Put a Little Love in Your Heart" Released: June 1969

Put a Little Love in Your Heart is an LP album by Jackie DeShannon, released by Imperial Records under catalog number LP-12442 as a stereo recording in 1969.

== Chart performance ==
The album debuted on Billboard magazine's Top LP's chart in the issue dated November 1, 1969, peaking at No. 85 during a fifteen-week run on the chart.

== Track listing ==
Put a Little Love in Your Heart track listing
No.	Title	Length
1.	"Put a Little Love in Your Heart"	2:40
2.	"You Are the Real Thing"	1:55
3.	"River of Love"	2:50
4.	"Keep Me in Mind"	2:00
5.	"Mama's Song"	3:17
6.	"Movin'"	3:12
7.	"You Can Come to Me"	2:17
8.	"You Have a Way with Me"	2:10
9.	"I Let Go Completely"	2:46
10.	"Always Together"	2:43
11.	"Love Will Find a Way"	2:38
12.	"Live"	3:45
Total length:		32:13

== Production ==
- James Langford, René Hall - arrangements
- Bud Dalin - executive producer
- Don Landee - engineer
- Ivan Nagy - photography
- Ron Wolin - art direction, design

== Charts ==
Chart (1969)	Peak position
US Billboard Top LPs	85
