= What the World Needs Now Is Love =

1965 single written by Bacharach & David

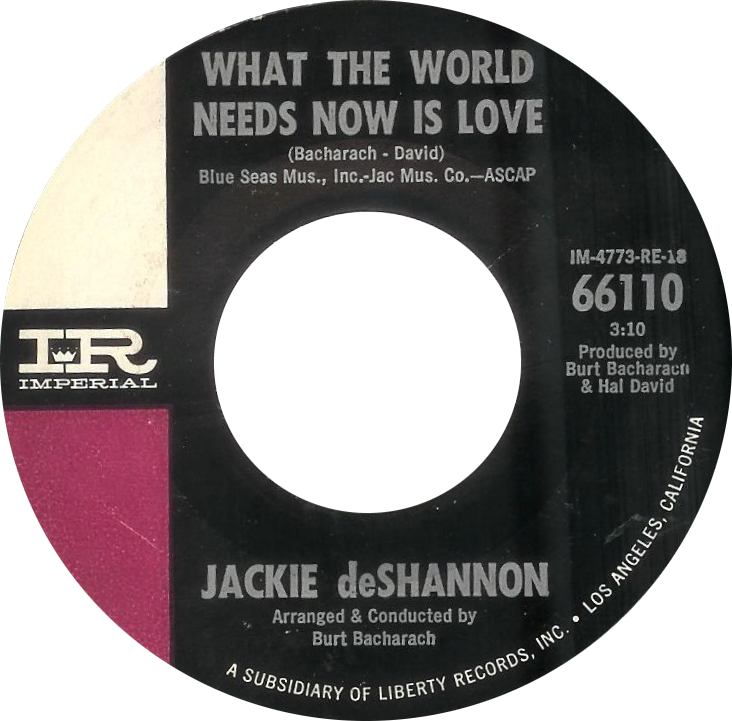
- A-side label of the 1965 US single

Single by Jackie DeShannon

from the album This Is Jackie DeShannon
- B-side: "I Remember the Boy"
- Released: April 15, 1965
- Recorded: March 23, 1965
- Studio: Bell Sound (New York City)
- Genre: Easy listening
- Length: 3:10
- Label: Imperial
- Songwriters: Burt Bacharach, Hal David
- Producers: Burt Bacharach, Hal David

Jackie DeShannon singles chronology
"When You Walk in the Room" (1964)	"What the World Needs Now Is Love" (1965)	"A Lifetime of Loneliness" (1965)

"What the World Needs Now Is Love" is a 1965 song with lyrics by Hal David and music composed by Burt Bacharach. First recorded and made popular by Jackie DeShannon, it was released on April 15, 1965, on the Imperial label after a release on sister label Liberty Records the previous month was canceled. It peaked at number seven on the US Hot 100 in July of that year. In Canada, the song reached number one.

In 2008, the 1965 recording by DeShannon on Imperial Records was inducted into the Grammy Hall of Fame.

== Songwriting ==
Co-songwriter Burt Bacharach revealed in his 2014 autobiography that this song had among the most difficult lyrics Hal David ever wrote, despite being deceptively simple as a pop hit. He explained that they had the main melody and chorus written back in 1962, centering on a waltz tempo, but it took another two years for David to finally come up with the lyric, "Lord, we don't need another mountain." Once David worked out the verses, Bacharach said the song essentially "wrote itself" and they finished it in a day or two.

The song's success caught the two songwriters completely by surprise, since they were very aware of the controversy and disagreements among Americans about the Vietnam War, which was the subtext for David's lyrics. Bacharach continuously used the song as the intro and finale for most of his live concert appearances well into the 2000s.

== Recording history ==
The song was originally offered to singer Dionne Warwick, who turned it down at the time, saying she felt it was "too country" for her tastes and "too preachy" though she later recorded it for her album Here Where There Is Love. (Warwick also recorded a second version in 1996, which scraped the lower reaches of the US Hot 100.) Bacharach initially did not believe in the song, and was reluctant to play it for DeShannon. The song was also rejected by Gene Pitney, reportedly over a financial dispute.

DeShannon's version was recorded on March 23, 1965, at New York's Bell Sound Studios. Bacharach arranged, conducted and produced the session. In 1967, the Chambers Brothers recorded a soul version of "What the World Needs Now Is Love" using gospel harmonies and 4/4 metric, on their album "The Time Has Come".

Glenn Yarbrough recorded a version on his 1965 album It's Gonna Be Fine.

An instrumental version of the song was featured regularly on the Jerry Lewis MDA Telethon for many years, most frequently heard when pledge amounts were announced on the broadcast.

R&B singer Luther Vandross recorded a version of the song on his 1994 album Songs.

Burt Bacharach performs a version of the song in the 1997 American film Austin Powers: International Man of Mystery, with the film's director describing Bacharach's performance as "the heart of our film".

DeShannon's version of the song was selected by the U.S. Library of Congress for preservation in the National Recording Registry in 2023.

In 2016, Broadway for Orlando recorded the song for sales to benefit the victims of the Orlando nightclub shooting.

== Tom Clay version ==
"What the World Needs Now Is Love/Abraham, Martin and John"

Single by Tom Clay

from the album What the World Needs Now Is Love
- B-side: "The Victors"
- Released: June 22, 1971
- Recorded: Early 1971
- Genre: Pop; medley; spoken word; sound collage
- Length: 6:10
- Label: Motown (MoWest MW5002F)
- Songwriters: Hal David, Burt Bacharach, Dick Holler
- Producer: Tom Clay

Tom Clay singles chronology
"What the World Needs Now Is Love/Abraham, Martin and John" (1971)	"Whatever Happened to Love" (1971)

In addition to the DeShannon hit recording and the numerous cover versions, "What the World Needs Now is Love" served as the basis for a distinctive 1971 remix. Disc jockey Tom Clay was working at radio station KGBS in Los Angeles, California, when he created the single "What the World Needs Now is Love/Abraham, Martin and John" (combining with the top 5 hit, in 1968, by Dion), a social commentary that became a surprise hit record that summer.

The song begins with a man asking a young girl to define such words as bigotry, segregation, and hatred (to which the girl says she does not know); she says that prejudice is "when someone's sick". Following that is a soundbite of a drill sergeant leading a platoon into training, along with gunfire sound effects, after which are snippets of the two songs – both as recorded by the Blackberries, a session recording group. Interspersed are excerpts of speeches by John F. Kennedy, Robert F. Kennedy, the eulogy given (by Ted Kennedy) after Robert's assassination, and Martin Luther King Jr., and soundbites of news coverage of each assassination. The ending of the song is a reprise of the introduction.

"What the World Needs Now is Love/Abraham, Martin and John" rose to No. 8 on the Billboard Hot 100 in August 1971, and was Clay's only top 40 hit. Reviewing Tom Clay's track for AllMusic, Andrew Hamilton called it an "inspirational sound collage" but felt that, after ten songs have been recited by Clay, "the concept wears thin and gets downright irritating." In 2019, Billboard writer Morgan Enos included the "obscure medley" in his list of songs that sample King Jr. Oliver Wang of NPR noted that the song, "a collage of found-sound snippets set to a syrupy arrangement of the Burt Bacharach tune", was the first single on Motown's Hollywood-based subsidiary label MoWest. He added that the song "became a surprising Top 10 hit and also helped set the tone for what would be a short and often strange history for the label."

== Chart history ==
=== Weekly charts ===
Jackie DeShannon

Chart (1965)	Peak position
Canada RPM Top Singles	1
U.S. Billboard Hot 100	7
U.S. Cash Box Top 100	9

Sweet Inspirations

Chart (1968)	Peak position
U.S. Billboard Bubbling Under the Hot 100	128

Tom Clay (medley)

Chart (1971)	Peak position
Australia Kent Music Report	3
Canada RPM Top Singles	11
New Zealand (Listener)	6
U.S. Billboard Hot 100	8
U.S. Cash Box Top 100	7

Dionne Warwick

Chart (1998)	Peak position
U.S. Billboard Hot 100	87

=== Year-end charts ===
Chart (1965)	Rank
U.S. Billboard Hot 100	63
U.S. Cash Box	27

== In popular culture ==
The Jackie DeShannon version was used in the final scene of the 1969 film Bob & Carol & Ted & Alice.

The song was used in 1997 film My Best Friend's Wedding.

The song (and a cameo from Burt Bacharach himself) also appears in the 1997 film, Austin Powers: International Man of Mystery, starring Mike Myers and Elizabeth Hurley.

Ania Karwan performed a version for the 2017 film Letters to Santa.

Missi Hale performed a version for the 2017 film The Boss Baby.

In April 2024, the song was used in the teaser trailer of Joker: Folie à Deux, which used Sammy Davis Jr. and Tom Jones' cover. Despite the film receiving negative reviews, the trailer was heavily praised.

In a 2024 Amazon ad titled "Midnight Opus," a former singer turned movie theater janitor sings the song at a surprise concert coordinated by his colleagues.

In 2026, the song is the theme of "The Farmer's Dog" pet food ads, "For Everyone's Dog."

In September 2026, the song was featured in the ending to the Oasis documentary “Oasis: Don’t look back in anger”

== See also ==
- List of anti-war songs

== Bibliography ==
- Platts, Robin (2003) Burt Bacharach & Hal David: What the World Needs Now, Collector's Guide Publishing, ISBN 1-896522-77-7
