= Max Caulfield =

Character in the Life Is Strange video game series

- Life Is Strange character
- Promotional art of Max Caulfield for Life is Strange: Remastered Collection (2022)
- First appearance: Life Is Strange (2015)
- Created by: Jean-Luc Cano; Michel Koch; Raoul Barbet; (Don't Nod)
- Portrayed by: Hannah Telle (video games); Tatum Grace Hopkins (TV series)

In-universe information
- Full name: Maxine Caulfield
- Occupation: High school student; Hobbyist photographer; University artist-in-residence
- Origin: Arcadia Bay, Oregon, U.S.

Maxine "Max" Caulfield is a character in the Life Is Strange video game series, published by Square Enix. Created by the French developer Dontnod Entertainment and portrayed by Hannah Telle, she is the main protagonist of the original Life Is Strange (2015), as well as Life Is Strange: Double Exposure (2024) and Life Is Strange: Reunion (2026), both developed by Deck Nine.

Introduced in Life Is Strange, Max is an introverted student with a passion for photography who attends Blackwell Academy. Upon witnessing the death of her childhood best friend, Chloe Price, she discovers her ability to rewind time and uses it to prevent her demise. The two reunite in their hometown of Arcadia Bay, Oregon, after five years apart and begin investigating the disappearance of Chloe's friend, Rachel Amber. As the player character, Max determines the course of events and confronts the consequences of her powers, including a recurring vision of an enormous tornado threatening to destroy Arcadia Bay.

Max has been well-received by critics for her relatability and character development. Additionally, Telle's performance has been acclaimed, receiving particular praise and award nominations for her role in Life Is Strange: Double Exposure. Alongside Chloe Price, Max was named one of the best video game characters of the 2010s by Polygon.

Tatum Grace Hopkins is set to portray Max in the upcoming television adaptation for Amazon Prime Video.

== Concept and creation ==
In Life Is Strange (2015), Max Caulfield is portrayed with the ability to rewind time, which supplements the game's core gameplay mechanics. As the player rewinds time, visual effects such as post-processing, double exposure, and overlapping screen-space particles are used as an artistic device; pertinent to Max's photography. Writing Max as an introverted yet principled teenager, the creators wanted her to resonate with contemporary youth, allowing players to connect with her experiences and provide an accessible entry point; with the intention of later subverting expectations via forcing her to make difficult and life-altering decisions. Additionally, Max must grapple with being "stuck in between time", a metaphorical limbo where past and present intersect. Christian Divine, one of the game's writers, crafted Max's dialogue with occasional older expressions. Her surname references Holden Caulfield from The Catcher in the Rye by J. D. Salinger, whose personality as an "iconic rebel" is echoed in Max's spirit of defiance and her characterization as an outsider in her community. The game's supernatural elements were written to be a metaphor for Max's inner turmoil, while her old-fashioned instant camera was intended to symbolise nostalgia.

=== Character design ===
Key art for Episode 5 of Life Is Strange, showing the character's progression from rough concept to final design.

Max was the second female protagonist in a Dontnod Entertainment title. According to a developer journal from the studio, many prospective publishers were unwilling to support a game with a female lead. Similar objections had been raised during the development of Remember Me, Dontnod Entertainment's first project featuring a female protagonist. Oskar Guilbert, the company's CEO, was also initially skeptical. Square Enix was the only publisher that did not request changes to the protagonist's gender.

Dontnod co-founder Jean-Maxime Moris stated that while gender equality in video games was "a great debate to have", the studio was "not pretending to address the issue or use the issue to stand out from the rest".

=== Portrayal ===
It was decided that the majority of the funding would be allocated to character writing and voice acting. Christian Divine and Cano were then entrusted with refining the English script. In July 2014, Hannah Telle auditioned for the role of Max Caulfield and was cast, while Ashly Burch auditioned for both Max and her eventual role, Chloe Price. Recording sessions took place in Los Angeles, California, with the French development team participating remotely via Skype.

== Appearances ==
=== Life Is Strange ===
Max Caulfield is the sole playable character and protagonist of Life Is Strange. She is introduced as an introverted twelfth-grade student attending Blackwell Academy in October 2013, with a particular interest in photography. During a photography class with her teacher Mark Jefferson, she experiences a vision of a lighthouse being destroyed by a huge tornado. Leaving for the restroom to regain her composure, she witnesses classmate Nathan Prescott (Nik Shriner) kill a young woman in a fit of rage. In a sudden effort, she develops the ability to rewind time and rescues the woman, later revealed to be her childhood best friend, Chloe Price. In shock from the day's events, Max hopes to confide in her friend Warren Graham before happening upon Chloe. The two reunite and Max reveals both her ability to travel back in time and that she had saved Chloe's life. Max's reoccurring vision is revealed to be a real-life, catastrophic storm approaching Arcadia Bay. The next day, Max observes fellow student Kate Marsh being bullied as a result of a viral video, depicting her uncharacteristically intoxicated and kissing several students at a Vortex Club party; Kate later denies that she had drank alcohol, leading Max to believe she had been drugged against her will.

Max using her time travel ability. The timer display is visible at the top left of the screen.

Meeting Chloe at the town's Two Whales diner, they decide to experiment with Max's power at Chloe's scrapyard hideout. However, the strain of her ability causes Max to have a nosebleed and faint. Chloe takes her back to Blackwell, but class is halted when Kate commits suicide by jumping from the roof of the girls' dormitory. Max manages to rewind time far enough to reach Kate before she jumps, allowing her an attempt to talk Kate down. (Note: Max can either save Kate or fail to talk her out of suicide.) Max, believing there to be a conspiracy in the town involving Nathan Prescott, aims to discover what prompted Kate's suicide attempt and the disappearance of Chloe's missing friend, Rachel Amber.

Later that night, Max and Chloe break into the principal's office to investigate further. The next morning, they sneak into the motorhome of Frank Bowers, a drug dealer and friend of Rachel. They learn that the two were in a relationship and that Rachel had lied to Chloe about it, leaving Chloe depressed. Max, back in her dorm, examines a childhood photo of herself and Chloe and is suddenly transported to the day the picture was taken; the same day Chloe's father William died in a traffic collision. Max prevents William's death, inadvertently creating an alternate reality where William is alive but Chloe has been paralysed from the neck down as a result of a car collision.

Max uses the photo to undo her decision and returns to the present day, restoring Chloe's health. Continuing their investigation, Max and Chloe obtain clues leading them to an abandoned barn owned by the influential Prescott family. They discover a hidden bunker containing pictures of Kate and Rachel tied up, intoxicated and posed for photos; Rachel is revealed to be buried at the scrapyard. Arriving there, the two uncover Rachel's body, to Chloe's despair.

Chloe intends to confront Nathan at the Vortex Club's "End of the World" party, believing him to be responsible for Rachel's death. Max, meanwhile, attempts to warn Victoria Chase of her potential kidnap by Nathan. They receive a text from Nathan threatening to destroy the evidence, returning them to the scrapyard. The two are then ambushed by Jefferson, who anaesthetises Max and kills Chloe. Max is kidnapped and held captive in the "Dark Room" (the same bunker she and Chloe had discovered earlier) where Jefferson has been drugging and photographing young girls.

Jefferson reveals that he had taken Nathan on as a protégé, but had recently killed him after he had given Rachel a fatal overdose while trying to mimic Jefferson's work. The latter intends to kill Max after he is satisfied with his photos of her. Max escapes into a photograph and emerges back at the beginning in Jefferson's class; she quickly alerts David, getting Jefferson and Nathan arrested.

In an alternate reality, Max is given the opportunity to go to San Francisco and have her work displayed in an art gallery. She calls Chloe from the event but realizes, despite all her effort, that the tornado has reached Arcadia Bay. Max travels back in time again, this time to the moment she took her entry photo. This eventually leads her to experience multiple collapsing realities as they devolve into a dreamscape nightmare, witnessing corrupted versions of her experiences, including a segment of many characters insulting Max while she is held captive in the Dark Room. Eventually, she makes her way to an alternate version of the Two Whales Diner, filled with immobile apparitions of all the people in Max's life begging her not to kill them. She encounters a more jaded, ruder version of herself who gaslights the real Max; trying to convince her that her relationship with Chloe is toxic. The latter soon appears and dismisses the alternate Max, asserting that their experiences together are real and genuine. Eventually, Max wakes up, and she and Chloe finally reach the lighthouse.

The two confront the possibility that Max brought the storm to fruition by saving Chloe from her death and rewinding time too often, thus creating too many alternate realities. Chloe, willing to accept her fate, implores Max to sacrifice her in favour of the town. Handing Max her butterfly photo from minutes before her death, Max is presented with the option to go back in time once more. Max must then make a choice: sacrifice Chloe's life and undo the previous week's events, saving Arcadia Bay; or sacrifice the town to the storm to spare Chloe.

- If Max sacrifices Chloe, the duo exchange tearful goodbyes. (Note: If the player had romantically pursued Chloe, the two share a parting kiss.) Max then uses the photo of the butterfly to return to the moment before Chloe's death, silently crying as she overhears the event unfold, unable to intervene. After a montage of subsequent events, Max is seen at the lighthouse and attending Chloe's funeral alongside many of the town's residents. She smiles as a butterfly lands on Chloe's coffin.
- If Max sacrifices Arcadia Bay, she rips the butterfly photo. The duo declare that they will be together forever, then hold hands as they watch the storm destroy Arcadia Bay. Max and Chloe leave the ruined town the following day, ready to start a new life.

Max reappears in the 2022 remaster of Life Is Strange. (Note: As part of the Life Is Strange: Remastered Collection.)

=== Life Is Strange: Before the Storm – "Farewell" ===
In the bonus chapter of Life Is Strange: Before the Storm, "Farewell", set in 2008, a 13-year-old Max Caulfield struggles to break the news to Chloe that her family is moving to Seattle in three days. The two find a recording of their 8-year-old selves speaking of a buried treasure. After finding the map and an amulet in the attic, Max and Chloe discover the treasure's spot, only to find that Chloe's dad, William, had put their time capsule in a keg, along with his own recording, for safekeeping. Max can choose to either tell Chloe the truth or hide it; regardless of her decision, their plans for the rest of the day are cut short when Chloe's mother, Joyce, returns home with the news of William's death. Max attends William's funeral days later and leaves for Seattle with her parents immediately after, leaving Chloe in grief.

Max reappears in the remastered Life Is Strange: Before the Storm "Farewell" chapter as part of the Life Is Strange Remastered Collection (2022).

=== Life Is Strange 2 ===
In Life Is Strange 2, Max is mentioned by David while talking to the game's protagonist Sean Diaz. If Arcadia Bay was sacrificed in the first game, Max is seen in a photograph kept in David's trailer, which shows both her and Chloe sometime after 2013. During David's phone call with Chloe, it hints that she and Chloe either live in or visited New York and had a bad experience with a local, as David reminds Chloe that "New Yorkers are assholes". It is also implied that she and Chloe had visited him sometime ago.

=== Life Is Strange: True Colors – "Wavelengths" ===
In the bonus chapter of Life Is Strange: True Colors, "Wavelengths", Max is mentioned by Steph Gingrich, the story's main character, during a tabletop game with Mikey if Arcadia Bay was sacrificed in the first game. Steph only states that Chloe was gone without any contact with her and the only thing she heard about Chloe is that she's wandering around with another "weirdo" (referring to Max).

=== Life Is Strange: Double Exposure ===
Max returns in Life Is Strange: Double Exposure, which is set years after the events of the first game. Max is now an adult and the photographer-in-residence at Caledon University. She had sworn never to use her time-rewinding powers again, as a result of the past consequences that occurred in Arcadia Bay. Should Chloe not be sacrificed in the first game, it is revealed that she and Max parted ways. One night, she discovers that her friend Safi has been murdered. Max attempts to rewind time to save her, but instead travels to a parallel timeline where Safi is alive. Max realizes the killer will soon strike again in both realities and attempts to both solve and prevent the same murder. She soon discovers that the killer is her future self, who did it to end a chaotic time vortex and also learns that Safi possesses the ability to shapeshift. Eventually, Max and Safi's powers create a storm similar to the one from Arcadia Bay, leading Max to journey through a transformed Caledon University and past visions of her time in Arcadia Bay inside the tornado, before eventually reuniting with Safi and returning to the real world, merging both timelines together in the process. In the aftermath, Safi leaves to search for others who have supernatural powers like her and Max, while Max herself reveals her powers to her peers.

=== Life Is Strange: Reunion ===
In Life Is Strange: Reunion, Max returns home from a gallery trip in New York to find Caledon on fire and signs of a massive protest. She finds Moses trapped on the roof of the observatory, but is unable to save him. She then travels back in time to the day she left to try and stop the fire. After investigating Abraxas House and saving Loretta from an illegal demolition, she reunites with Chloe, who is trying to get answers from Max about her visions from the consequences of the events in Arcadia Bay and of Safi. It is revealed later in Max's conversation with Safi, that while stopping the storm at Caledon and saving Safi, Max also merged the timelines where Chloe lived and died, saving both Chloe and Arcadia Bay. This weaved Safi and Chloe's fates in a break in time and space called "The Overlight" which they both experience in moments. Regardless of whether Max and Chloe find the people who are to set the fire or not, the fire at the observatory always happens. Max rescues Chloe, Moses, and possibly Safi (depending on Chloe in "The Overlight") from the rooftop of the observatory. Max then leaves Caledon with Chloe while it recovers from the fire. During the tour of a band Chloe manages, Chloe receives the photo from Moses that Max took to travel back in time, giving Chloe the option to destroy it or give it to her. If the photo is destroyed, Max and Chloe look forward to the future. If the photo is given to Max, she will use it to go back in time to try in save everyone if people died in the fire, or she will burn it if everyone survived.

=== Life Is Strange comic series ===
The Life Is Strange comic series follows Max and Chloe in the timeline where Max chooses to save Chloe and sacrifice Arcadia Bay. Max and Chloe are living in Seattle and befriend a band for whom Chloe does artwork. Max and Chloe find themselves returning to Arcadia Bay after it becomes apparent that Max can no longer control her time powers. The two return to Arcadia Bay and Max realizes that she is drifting in and out of different realities, a phenomenon that she refers to as "flickers". After a conversation with Chloe about their romantic feelings towards each other and multiple experiences in different realities, Max decides to fully jump into a different timeline and abandon her original one in order to stop the chaos of the flickers. Doing so puts her in a timeline where Rachel Amber is still alive and in a relationship with Chloe.

Max then lives in that timeline for years and becomes close with Rachel and Chloe, who are unaware of her time traveling capabilities. Eventually, Max meets Tristan, a man who possesses the ability to become invisible. This prompts her to begin to make efforts to return to her original timeline with Tristan's help after revealing to Chloe and Rachel the truth about who she is. Tristan is able to jump to Max's original timeline and communicate with Chloe there that Max is attempting to return. Max then accompanies Rachel and the Chloe in her current timeline on a cross country road trip that coincides with a cross country road trip the Chloe in her original timeline is taking. Through Tristan, Max and her original Chloe are able to communicate with each other and Max begins to prepare herself to make the jump back to her original timeline. In Miami, Max is able to go back into her own timeline with the help of Tristan, who also comes into Max's timeline. Max and Chloe then return to a rebuilding Arcadia Bay, where she discovers Chloe has rebuilt the Two Whales. With Max coming to terms with the tragedy and loss caused by the storm, she is able to speak at Victoria's memorial exhibition, honoring the resilience of the town.

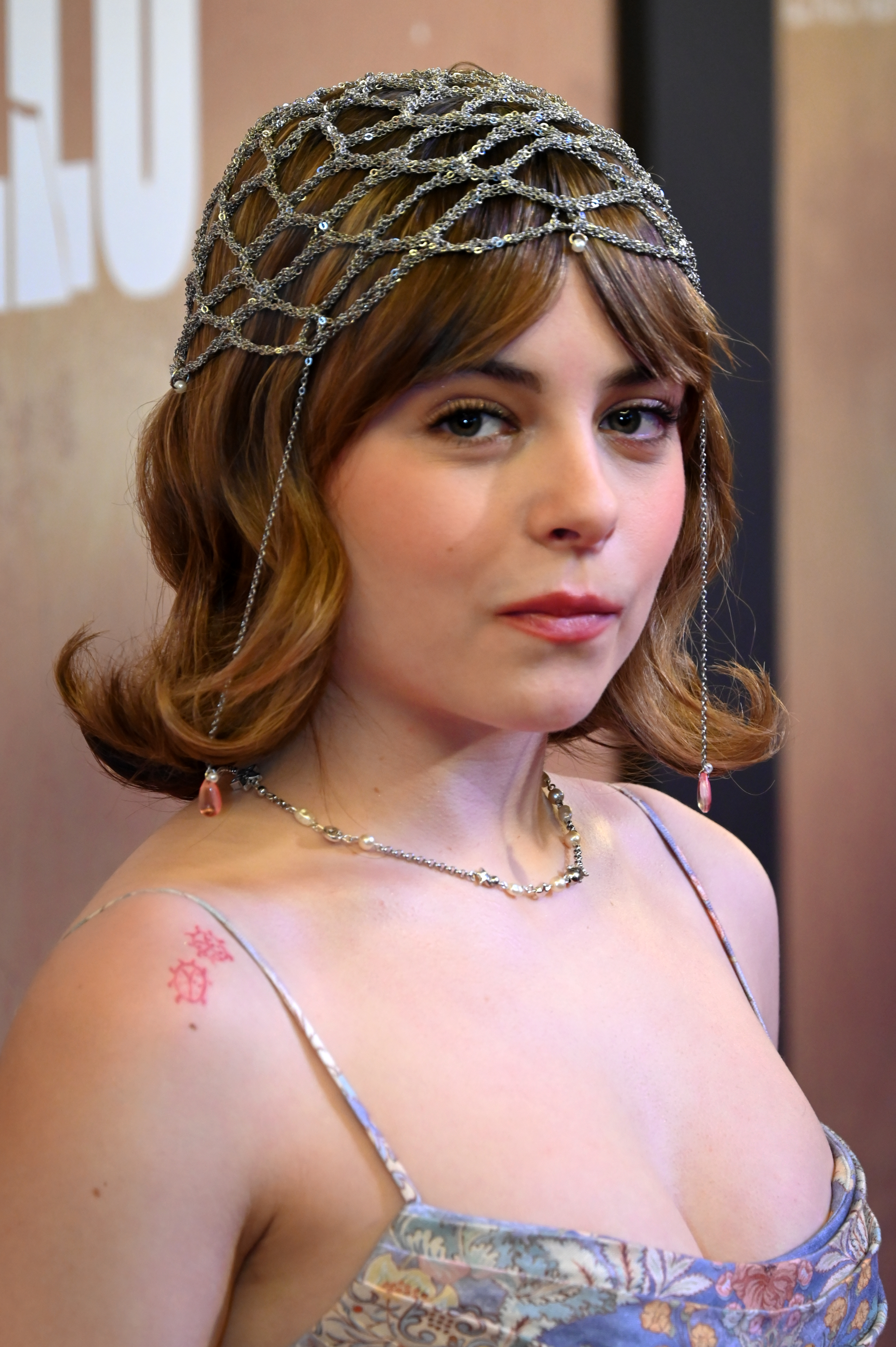
Tatum Grace Hopkins will portray Max Caulfield in the upcoming television series.

=== Television series ===
In March 2026, Tatum Grace Hopkins was cast as Max in the upcoming television adaptation of the 2015 video game for Amazon Prime Video; opposite Maisy Stella as Chloe Price. The series will be Hopkins' television debut.

== Reception ==
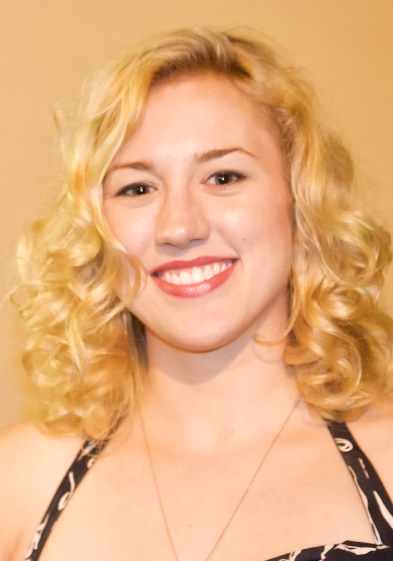
Hannah Telle's performance as Max received praise and awards nominations.

Life Is Strange reached both commercial and critical success and was highly praised for its character development in particular. For their work with Max Caulfield, Dontnod received an award nomination from the Academy of Interactive Arts & Sciences for Outstanding Achievement in Character at the 19th Annual D.I.C.E. Awards. In 2018, IGN published an article by Seamus Mullins where he lauded Max as the most complex video game protagonist he has ever experienced. Max was ranked by PC Gamer staff as among the most iconic characters in PC gaming. Peter Paras of Game Revolution complimented Max's character beats, who he said "really comes into her own as [a] fully-formed character." Metro commented that Max Caulfield has it all, claiming that "She's witty, intelligent and her outlook on life is perfectly characterised via her music taste." Game Informer ranked Max among the best female characters from the year 2015, with Elise Favis calling Max a "rarity, and not only because she's a teenage female lead."

Along with Chloe Price, Polygon staff named Max as one of the best video game characters of the 2010s. Though Chloe is often considered the more pivotal character for the story arc, there is interest in seeing more of Max's story.

Some critics have argued that Max's character and development felt generic and inauthentic, perhaps because she is a female character created by male writers. Jean-Maxine Moris, a creative lead in Life is Strange, argued against this criticism by stating that extensive research was done before creating the characters in the game and that it is backed by Square Enix because it was the only publishing partner that did not try and change critical aspects of the game such as the gender of the main characters.

Telle's performance as Max in Double Exposure received praise, and she was nominated for Best Performance at the Game Awards 2024 and the 14th New York Game Awards.
