= Life Is Strange (TV series) =

Upcoming American television series

- Genre: Science fiction; Mystery; Drama; Coming-of-age
- Created by: Charlie Covell
- Based on: Life Is Strange by Don't Nod
- Showrunner: Charlie Covell
- Starring: Tatum Grace Hopkins; Maisy Stella; Tom Cullen; Leisha Hailey; Raúl Castillo; Owen Teague; Billy Barratt; Emily Carey; Esther McGregor; Faly Rakotohavana; Mia Isaac
- Country of origin: United States
- Original language: English

Production
- Executive producers: Charlie Covell; Dmitri M. Johnson; Michael Lawrence Goldberg; Timothy I. Stevenson; Karyn Kusama; Jen Roskind; Mackenzie Dohr; Dani Gorin; Natalie Berkus
- Production location: Vancouver
- Cinematography: Vincent De Paula
- Production companies: Square Enix; Story Kitchen; LuckyChap Entertainment; Familystyle; Amazon MGM Studios

Original release
- Network: Amazon Prime Video

Life Is Strange is an upcoming American science fiction mystery drama television series created by Charlie Covell for Amazon Prime Video. Based on the 2015 video game developed by Don't Nod, the series follows photography student Max Caulfield, who gains the ability to rewind time while saving the life of her best friend, Chloe Price. Max and Chloe then work together to explore the dark side of the town of Arcadia Bay and solve the disappearance of Chloe's friend, Rachel Amber.

A co-production between Square Enix, Story Kitchen, LuckyChap Entertainment, and Amazon MGM Studios, the series was ordered by the latter in September 2025, with Covell serving as showrunner, and writing alongside Mackenzie Dohr. Hopkins and Stella were cast in the lead roles in March 2026, with casting for supporting roles occurring throughout May and June. Principal photography began in late June in Vancouver, with Karyn Kusama, Lauren Wolkstein, Silas Howard, and Daisy von Scherler Mayer serving as directors, and wrapped in mid-October.

Life Is Strange is expected to consist of eight episodes and is set to be released on Amazon Prime Video.

== Premise ==
Photography student Max Caulfield discovers she can rewind time while saving the life of her childhood best friend Chloe Price. While struggling with her power, Max and Chloe work together to explore the dark side of the town of Arcadia Bay and solve the disappearance of Chloe's friend, Rachel Amber.

== Cast and characters ==
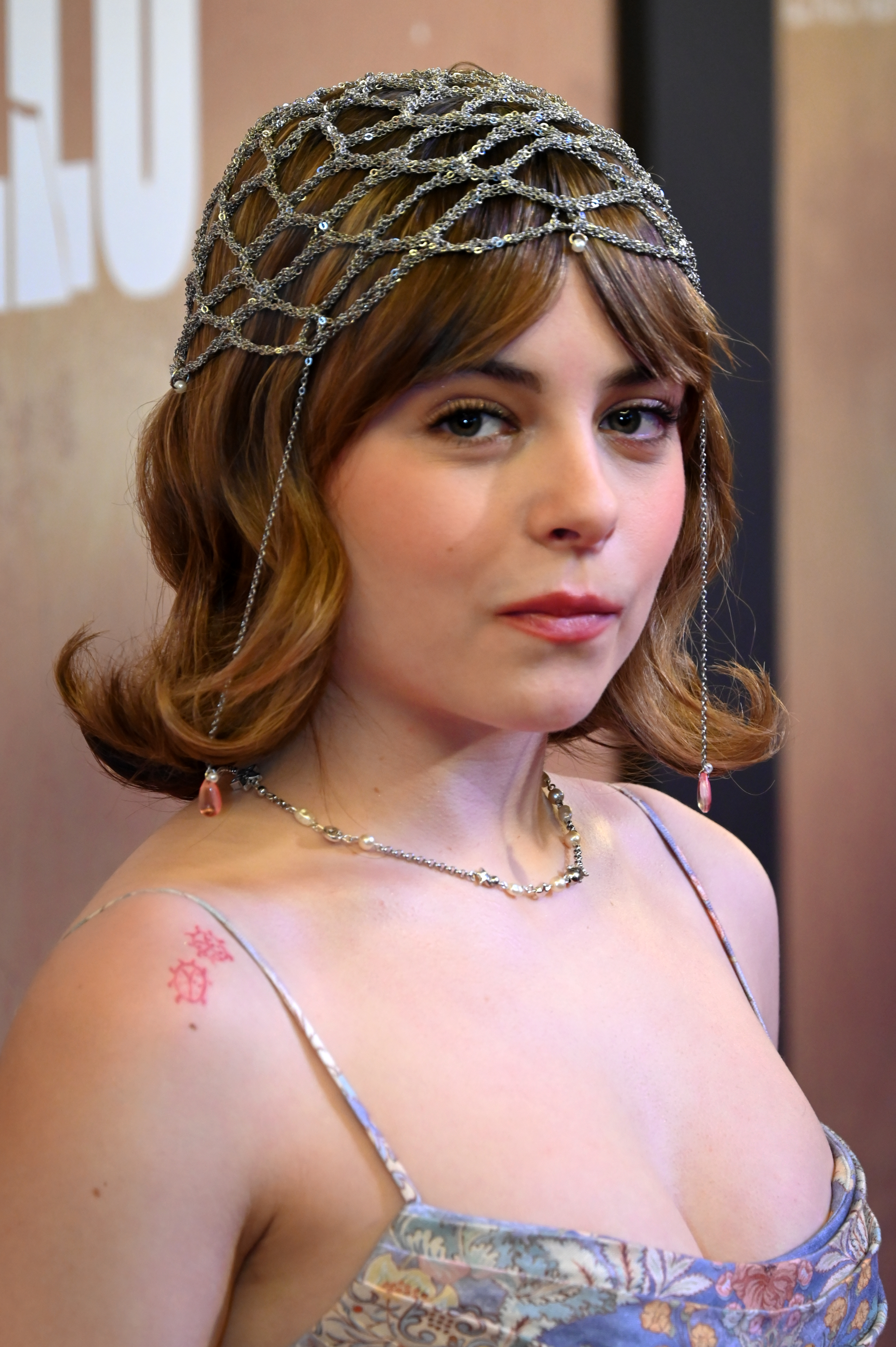
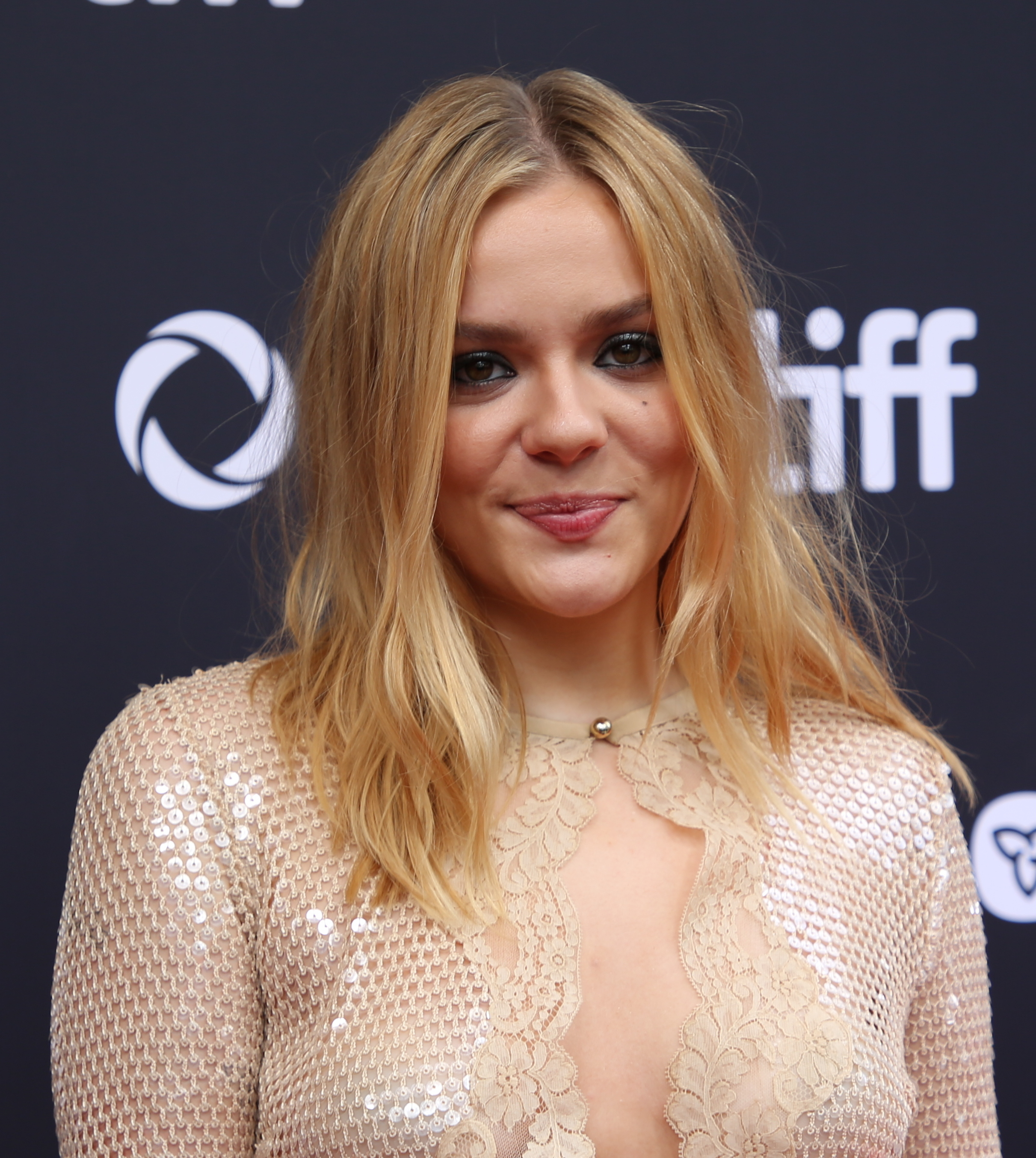
Tatum Grace Hopkins (left) and Maisy Stella (right) portray the lead characters, Max Caulfield and Chloe Price.
- Tatum Grace Hopkins as Max Caulfield, a photography student at Blackwell Academy who discovers she has the ability to rewind time
- Maisy Stella as Chloe Price, a rebellious but troubled girl and Max's childhood best friend
- Tom Cullen as Mark Jefferson, the photography lecturer at Blackwell Academy
- Leisha Hailey as Joyce Price, Chloe's widowed mother
- Raúl Castillo as David Madsen, Chloe's stepfather who works as the head of security for Blackwell Academy
- Owen Teague as Frank Bowers, a local drug dealer
- Billy Barratt as Nathan Prescott, a student and the son of the wealthy Prescott family
- Emily Carey as Victoria Chase, a photography student, Nathan's friend, and Jefferson's protege
- Esther McGregor as Rachel Amber, Chloe's friend who has mysteriously disappeared from Arcadia Bay
- Faly Rakotohavana as Warren Graham, a student and Max's friend
- Mia Isaac as Kate Marsh, a devoutly Christian student and Max's friend

== Production ==
=== Development ===
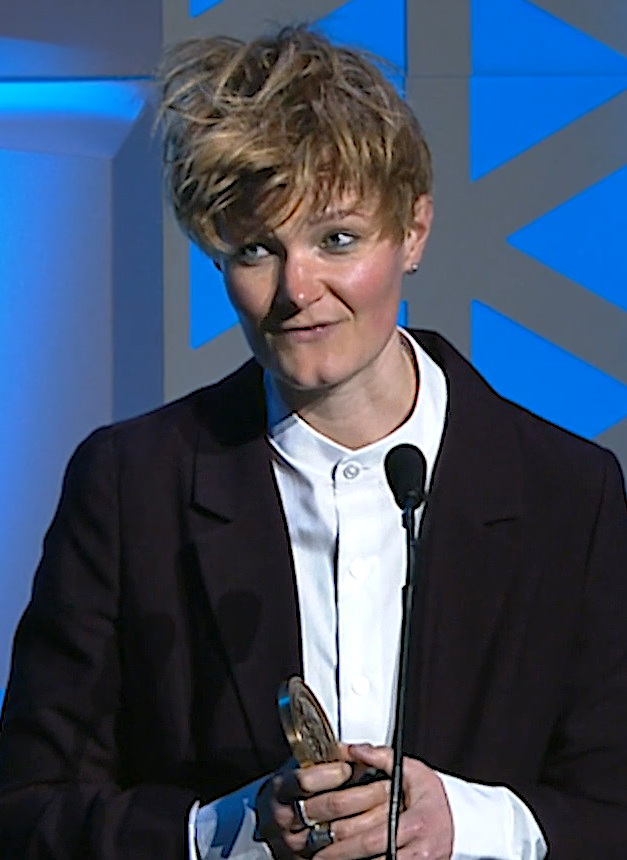
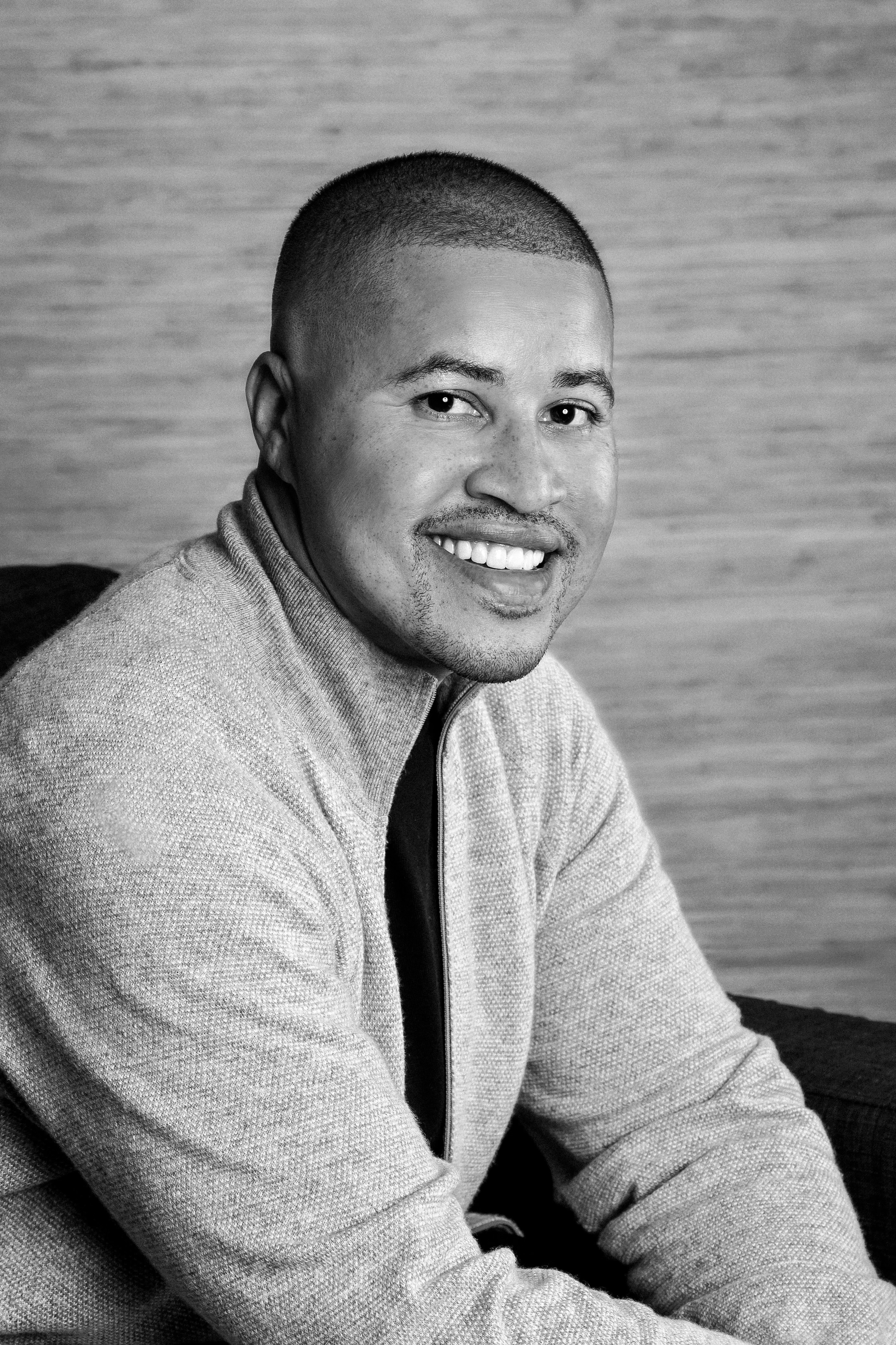
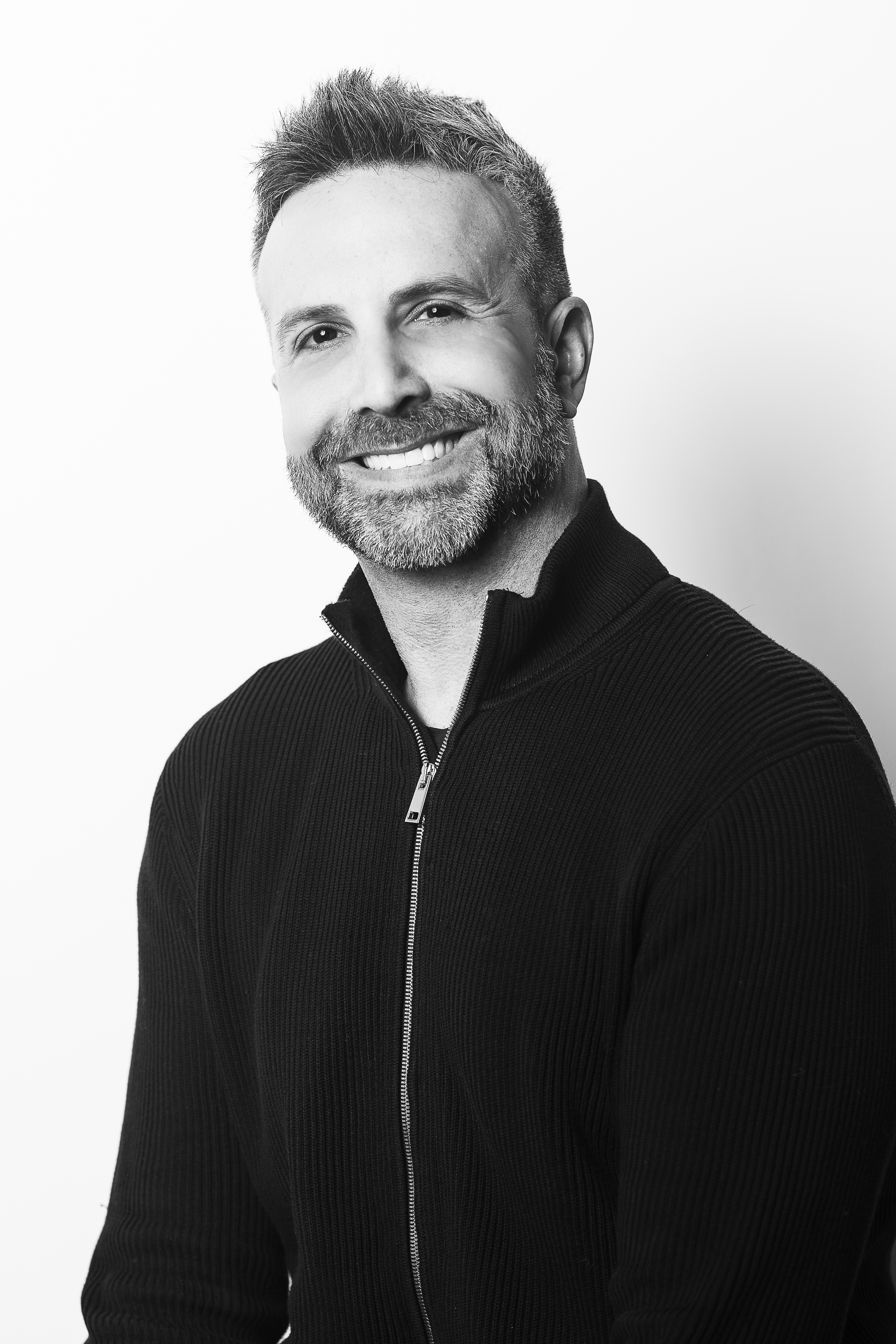
Charlie Covell (left) serves as the creator and showrunner of the series, while Dmitri M. Johnson and Michael Lawrence Goldberg produce for Story Kitchen.

In July 2016, Square Enix, Legendary Digital Studios, and dj2 Entertainment announced that they would be adapting Life Is Strange as a digital series. At the time of the announcement, they were meeting with potential writers for the series adaptation. In 2017, dj2 Entertainment sold the rights to the series to the streaming service Hulu. In August 2021, it was announced that Shawn Mendes would serve as an executive producer, in addition to overseeing the music for the series. It was also announced that Anonymous Content would be joining as a production company for the series.

In September 2025, the series was greenlit at Amazon Prime Video, with Charlie Covell serving as the showrunner, writer, and executive producer. Square Enix, Story Kitchen, LuckyChap Entertainment, and Amazon MGM Studios are set to produce with Dmitri M. Johnson, Michael Lawrence Goldberg, and Timothy I. Stevenson serving as executive producers through Story Kitchen. Dani Gorin and Natalie Berkus executive produce through LuckyChap Entertainment, and director Karyn Kusama executive produces through Familystyle. Other executive producers include Jen Roskind and Mackenzie Dohr.

=== Writing ===
In mid-2025, LuckyChap Entertainment was preparing the writers' room for the series in London. Showrunner Charlie Covell writes alongside Mackenzie Dohr. Goldberg discussed adapting a heavily choice-based, engaged, and interactive game, explaining that since they could not satisfy each player choice and had to commit to certain events, it was a challenge to adapt the story in a passive medium and still make it "rewarding and fresh" for players of the game. Covell played the entirety of the game series, and worked with Square Enix on the adaptation. Executive producer Natalie Berkus wrote that the series stemmed from being "a big and operatic idea" in the games, and that Covell rooted the storytelling "in the emotional truths of the characters".

=== Casting ===
In March 2026, Maisy Stella and Tatum Grace Hopkins were confirmed to have been cast as protagonists Chloe Price and Max Caulfield, respectively. The series will be Hopkins' television debut. Stella had contributed to the soundtrack of LuckyChap's television series Sterling Point (2026) by creator Megan Park, who also cast her in the film My Old Ass (2024), and Stella's casting in Life Is Strange represented a "repeat business" relationship for LuckyChap. In May and June 2026, Tom Cullen, Leisha Hailey, Raúl Castillo, Owen Teague, Billy Barratt, Emily Carey, Esther McGregor, Faly Rakotohavana, and Mia Isaac joined the cast.

=== Filming ===
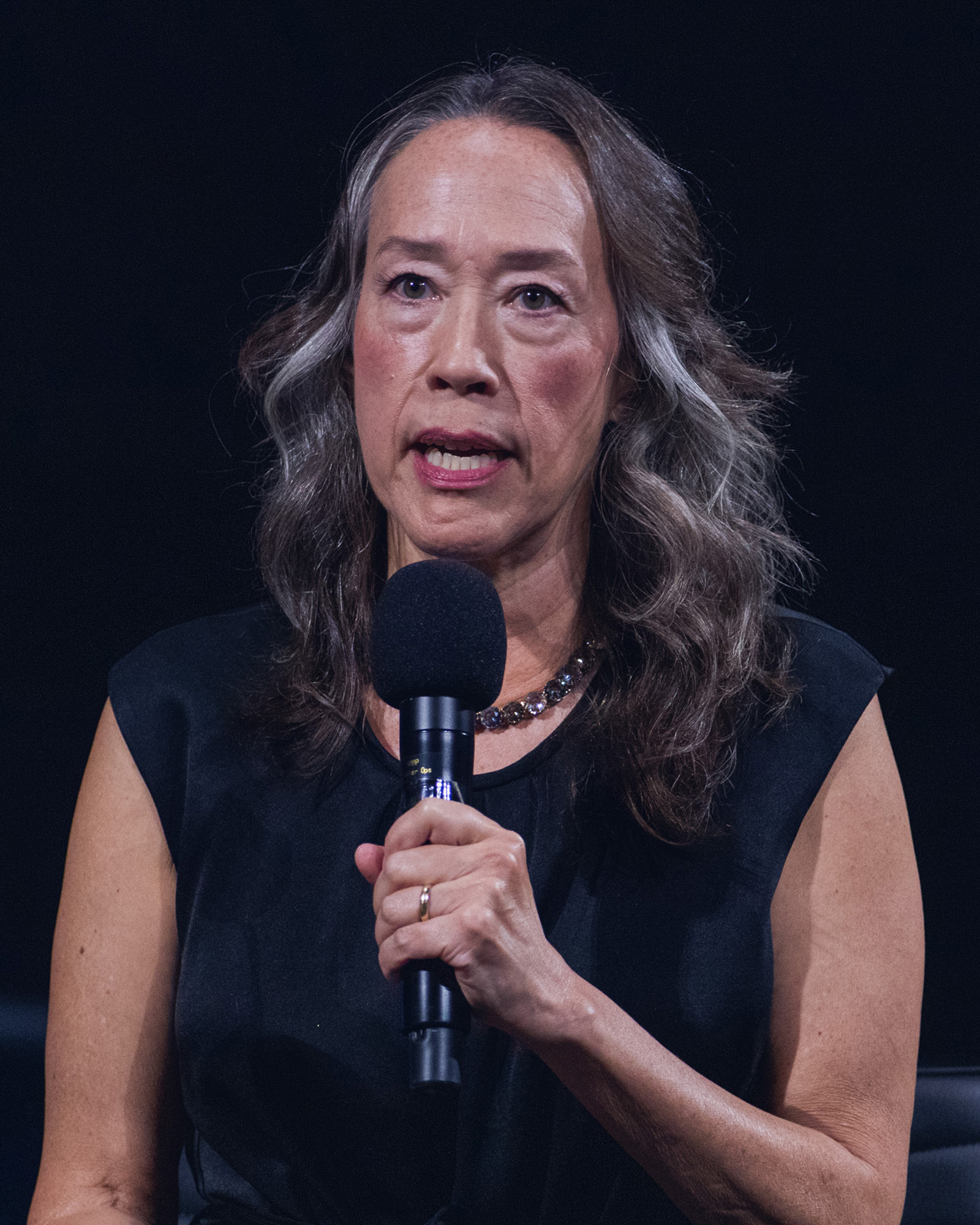
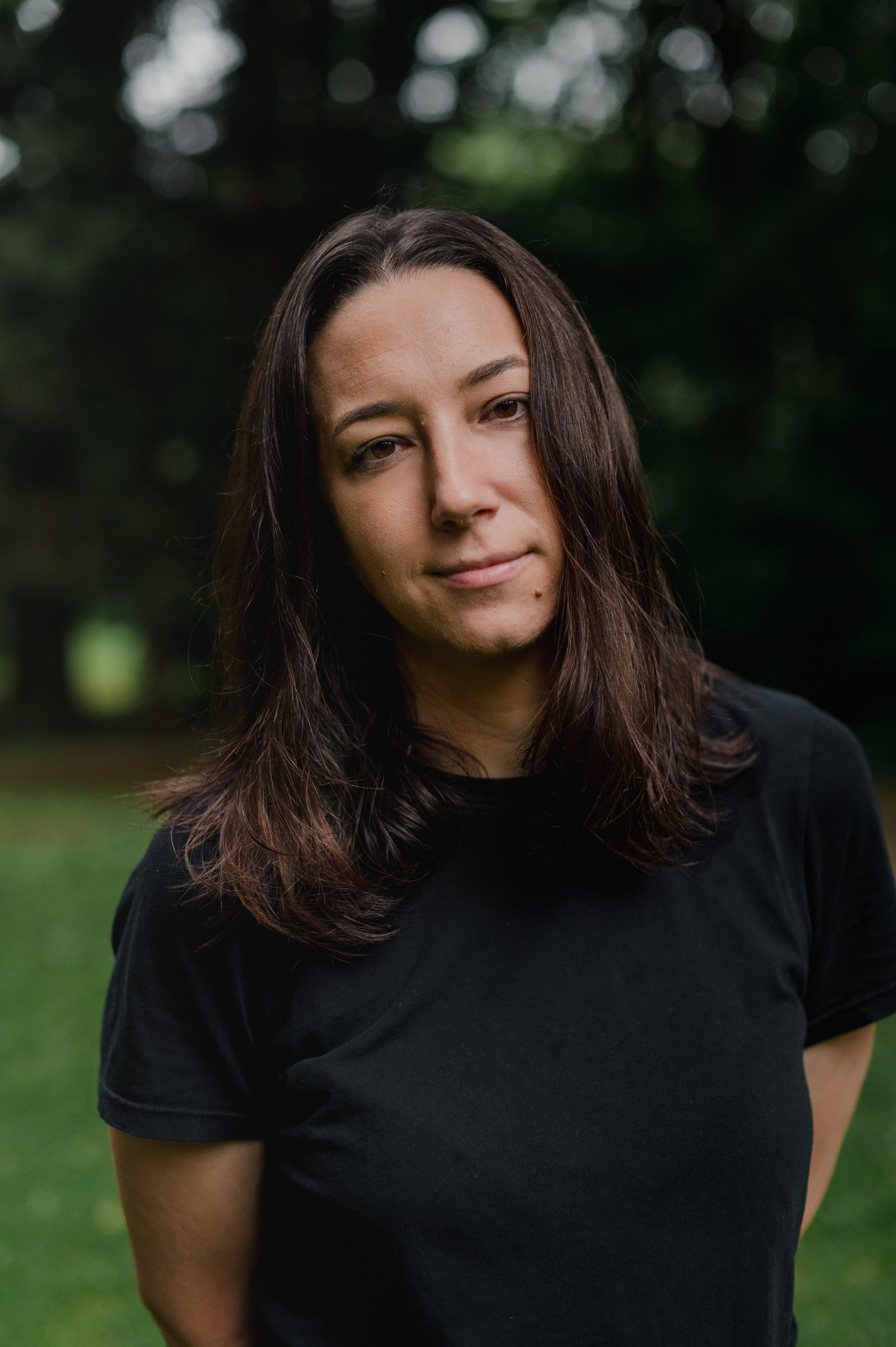
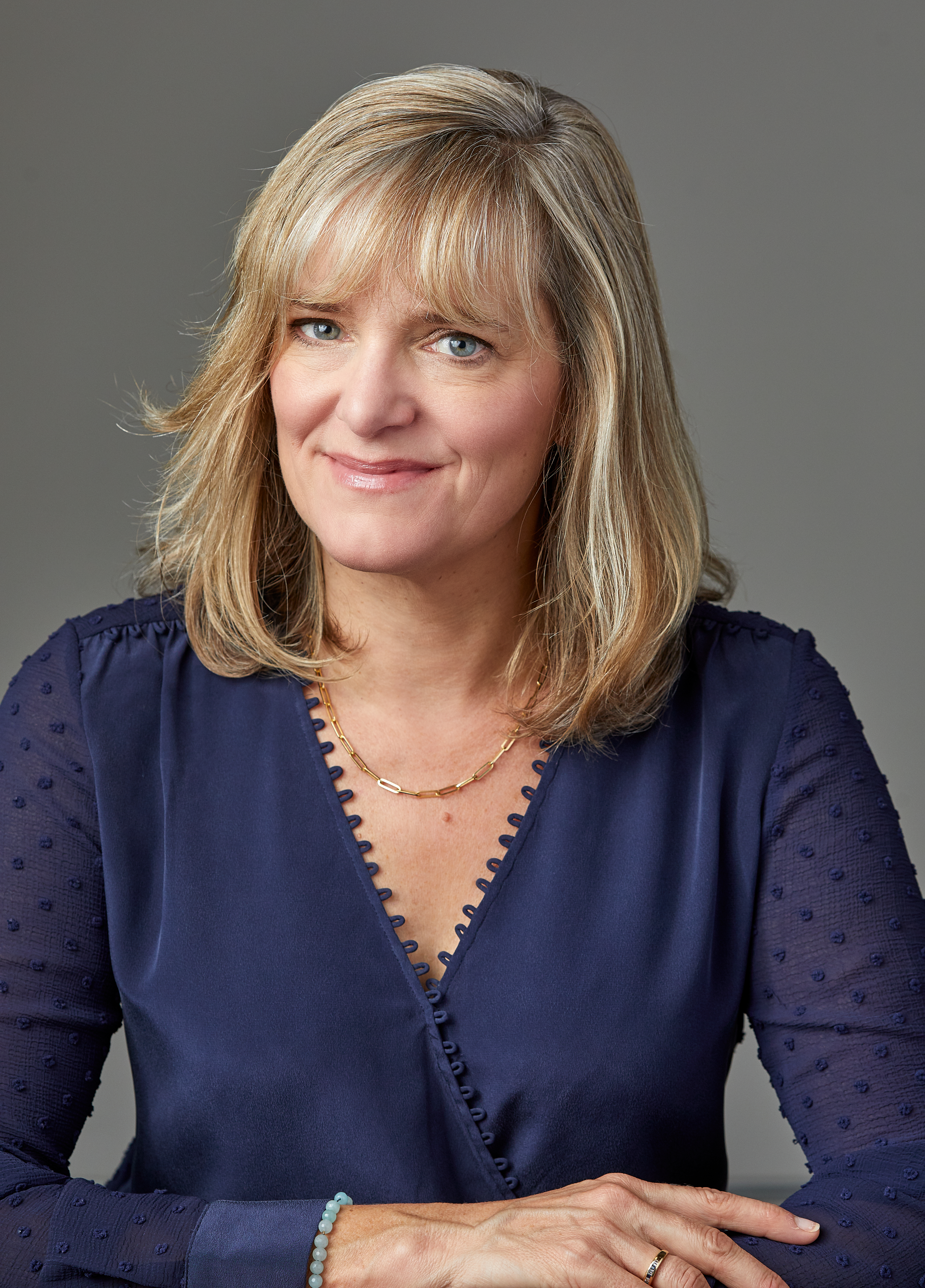
Karyn Kusama, Lauren Wolkstein, Silas Howard, and Daisy von Scherler Mayer direct on the series.

Principal photography began on June 29, 2026, in Vancouver, under the working title Fender. Karyn Kusama was confirmed to direct the first two episodes, and other directors include Lauren Wolkstein, Silas Howard, and Daisy von Scherler Mayer. Vincent De Paula served as cinematographer. De Paula announced on October 10 that filming had wrapped. That month, co-creators Michel Koch, Jean-Luc Cano, Luc Baghadoust of Don't Nod visited the set, with Koch giving his approval of the series and praising Hopkins and Stella.

== Release ==
Life Is Strange will be released on Amazon Prime Video, and is set to consist of eight episodes.
