= Esther McGregor =

British actress and model (born 2001)

- Born: Esther Rose McGregor; 22 October 2001 (age 25); London, England
- Education: New York University
- Occupations: Actress; model; musician
- Years active: 2018–present
- Height: 5 ft 4 in (163 cm)
- Father: Ewan McGregor
- Relatives: Clara McGregor (sister); Denis Lawson (great-uncle); Mary Elizabeth Winstead (stepmother)

Esther Rose McGregor (born 22 October 2001) is a British actress, model, and musician.

== Early life ==
McGregor was born in London to Scottish actor Ewan McGregor and French-Greek Jewish production designer Eve Mavrakis. She has three sisters, Clara, Jamyan, and Anouk. She also has a half-brother, Laurie, through her father's second marriage to actress Mary Elizabeth Winstead. Her great-uncle, Denis Lawson, is also an actor.

McGregor is bilingual, speaking both English and French, and was raised Jewish. She attended North Bridge House School in North London. At 11, she and her family moved to Los Angeles. She later attended New York University.

== Career ==
McGregor began modeling at the age of 16. Her first modeling job was alongside her older sister, Clara. She has modeled for Fendi, Stella McCartney, Miu Miu, and Celine. Miucci Prada herself handpicked her to open a spring/summer show in Milan. During the COVID-19 pandemic, she started a band named French Thyme. They released their first EP in 2020. She also became a licensed tattoo artist and opened a tattoo shop named Pink Ether in New York City.

In 2022, she made a cameo in the second episode of the Disney+ miniseries Obi-Wan Kenobi. She told Vanity Fair, "My parents never let me do anything onscreen until I was old enough to executively make the decision, and also old enough to be a human on set." That year, she also played Natalie in the coming-of-age drama series High School, based on the 2019 memoir of the same name by Sara and Tegan Quin. In May 2024, she was cast in the Amazon Prime Video original series We Were Liars, based on the 2014 novel of the same name by E. Lockhart. In June 2026, she was cast as Rachel Amber in the television adaptation of Life Is Strange. She starred opposite Zach Braff in the 2026 film Clean Hands, written and directed by Jake Allyn. In October 2026, she was cast as Violet Sorrengail in Fourth Wing, based on the 2023 romantic fantasy novel by Rebecca Yarros.

== Filmography ==
=== Film ===
Key
†	Denotes films that have not yet been released

Year	Title	Role	Ref.
2023	Bleeding Love	Teenage girl	
2024	Babygirl	Isabel Mathis	
2024	The Room Next Door	Young Martha	
2026	Clean Hands	Brooke Simmers	
2027	A Place in Hell †	TBA	
TBA	Alma †	TBA	
TBA	Becoming Capa †	Gerda Taro	
TBA	The Cackling of the Dodos †	TBA	

=== Television ===
Key
†	Denotes television productions that have not yet been released

Year	Title	Role	Notes	Ref.
2018	Resting Pitch Face	Nicky	Episode: "Gender Parody"	
2022	Obi-Wan Kenobi	Tetha Grig	Episode: "Part II"	
2022	High School	Natalie	7 episodes	
2025	We Were Liars	Mirren Sinclair Sheffield	Main role	
TBA	Life Is Strange †	Rachel Amber	Main role	
TBA	Fourth Wing †	Violet Sorrengail	Main role	
