= Chloe Price =

Fictional character from Life Is Strange

- Life Is Strange character
- Promotional art of Chloe Price for Life Is Strange: Remastered Collection (2022)
- First appearance: Life Is Strange (2015)
- Created by: Jean-Luc Cano; Michel Koch; Raoul Barbet; (Don't Nod)
- Portrayed by: Ashly Burch (video games) (Note: Burch portrays the character in Life Is Strange and Farewell); Rhianna DeVries (video games) (Note: DeVries portrays the character in Life Is Strange: Before the Storm and Life Is Strange: Reunion); Maisy Stella (TV series)

In-universe information
- Full name: Chloe Elizabeth Price
- Occupation: High school student; Band manager
- Family: William Price (father, deceased); Joyce Price (mother); David Madsen (step-father)
- Origin: Arcadia Bay, Oregon, U.S.

Chloe Elizabeth Price is a character in the Life Is Strange video game series, published by Square Enix. Created by the French developer Dontnod Entertainment, she is voiced by Ashly Burch in the original Life Is Strange (2015). Rhianna DeVries voices the character in the prequel Life Is Strange: Before the Storm (2017) (Note: Burch voices Chloe in the Before The Storm bonus episode Farewell.) and Life Is Strange: Reunion (2026), both developed by Deck Nine.

Chloe is introduced in Life Is Strange as the fiercely rebellious yet troubled childhood best friend of the protagonist, Max Caulfield. After five years apart, the two reunite in the coastal town of Arcadia Bay, Oregon. Chloe becomes central to the narrative when Max discovers her ability to rewind time after witnessing Chloe's death at the hands of fellow student Nathan Prescott. The pair subsequently begin investigating the disappearance of Rachel Amber. In Before the Storm, a prequel set three years prior to the first game, players control a 16-year-old Chloe, exploring her grief following her father's death and her developing relationship with Rachel.

Chloe has been well received by critics, who praised her complexity, emotional depth, and the performances of her voice actors; many publications have cited her as one of the best video game characters of all time. Alongside Max Caulfield, Chloe was named one of the best video game characters of the 2010s by Polygon.

Maisy Stella is set to portray Chloe in the upcoming television adaptation for Amazon Prime Video.

== Development ==
In Before the Storm, Rhianna DeVries provided performance capture for Chloe and voiced the character in the prequel's main episodes. Ashly Burch, who voiced the character Life is Strange, did not reprise her role due to the 2016 SAG-AFTRA video game voice actors' strike. She instead served as a writing consultant on the project and later returned to voice Chloe in the bonus episode Farewell.

The game's soundtrack was developed with a strong emphasis on thematic Instrumentation to reflect aspects of Chloe's personality and emotional state. Piano was used to convey isolation and vulnerability, electric guitar for her rebellious traits, and layered vocals represented friendship and emotional connection. Composer Daughter took the script and concept artwork as inspiration.

The narrative design incorporated research into memoir literature and psychological studies relating to adolescent grief, trauma, and identity formation. This research informed the portrayal of Chloe's emotional responses and interpersonal relationships.

Symbolism is a recurring element in the Life is Strange series, and Chloe is frequently associated with transformative imagery. A prominent example is the blue butterfly (and confirmed by the directors of the game (Note: In "Life is Strange - Directors' Commentary")) that appears shortly before her initial death in the original game. Butterflies are widely interpreted in various cultures as symbols of transformation and rebirth, which has been connected to Chloe's narrative arc and the game's exploration of altered timelines. This can be connected with Chloe due to her emotional journey with Max as the storm approaches. Her many deaths in the game could also be interpreted as a form of rebirth, as Max witnesses Chloe's death and alters time to bring her back.

Following the announcement of Reunion, Burch stated that she had not been asked to reprise her role as Chloe and that she learned about the game only when it was publicly announced, though she expressed appreciation for the character.

== Appearances ==
=== Life Is Strange ===
In the fictional town of Arcadia Bay in 2013, photography student Max Caulfield discovers the ability to rewind time and uses her power to save a young woman from being killed by her classmate Nathan Prescott at Blackwell Academy. Max later learns that the woman she saved was her childhood friend Chloe, and the two reunite and spend the day together before going for a walk near a local lighthouse. Max learns that Chloe's friend Rachel Amber has been missing for several months. Max reveals to Chloe her capacity to travel back in time, and that she has seen visions of a catastrophic tornado destroying the town.

The following day, the two meet at the diner where Chloe's mother Joyce works and decide to experiment with Max's power at Chloe's secret scrapyard hideout. However, strain from using her powers causes Max to have a nosebleed and faint. Chloe catches her and waits for her to wake up at the junkyard. Upon waking up, Frank Bowers, a drug dealer and friend of Rachel, shows up and starts trouble. Chloe takes Max back to Blackwell after Frank leaves.

Max agrees to help Chloe find out what happened to Rachel after the suicide attempt of fellow student Kate Marsh and theorizes that their situations are connected. They break into the principal's office that night to investigate and enter the school's pool for a swim before evading Blackwell's security and fleeing back to Chloe's place. The next morning, they sneak into Frank's motorhome and learn that Rachel was in a relationship with Frank and lied to Chloe about it, causing Chloe to storm off feeling betrayed. Max returns to her dormitory and examines a childhood photo of her and Chloe, but is suddenly transported to the day the picture was taken. Max prevents Chloe's father William from dying in a traffic collision, which inadvertently creates an alternative reality where William is alive but Chloe has been paralyzed from the neck down.

Max uses the photo to undo her decision and return to the present day, restoring Chloe's health. Continuing their investigation, Max and Chloe obtain clues leading them to an abandoned barn owned by Nathan's wealthy and influential family. They discover a hidden bunker containing pictures of Rachel and Max's classmate Kate tied up and intoxicated, with Rachel being buried at Chloe's secret hideout. They hurry back to the scrapyard and find Rachel's grave, much to Chloe's despair. Max follows Chloe to a school party to confront Nathan, believing he will target fellow student Victoria Chase next. They receive a text from Nathan threatening to destroy the evidence and rush back to the scrapyard.

They return to Rachel's grave, where the two are suddenly ambushed by Max's teacher Mark Jefferson, who anaesthetizes Max and kills Chloe with a gunshot to the head. Max is kidnapped and held captive in the bunker's "Dark Room", where Jefferson has been drugging and photographing young girls to capture their innocence. Jefferson also reveals that he took Nathan on as a personal student, but killed him before abducting Max. Max escapes into a photograph and emerges back in time several days, resetting the timeline. She alerts David, getting Jefferson (and Nathan) arrested.

Between this period of time, the Dark Room is found, where they find evidence of what happened to Kate and Rachel (which leads to the discovery of her body). Max and Chloe meet at the lighthouse on Tuesday where the latter comforts the former about Rachel, and due to David's part in bringing Rachel's killers to justice, their relationship has significantly improved. She also becomes hopeful of life again, applying to Bay City College, wanting to repair her life.

Max is given the opportunity to go to San Francisco and have one of her photos displayed in an art gallery. She calls Chloe from the event and discovers that the storm has reached Arcadia Bay. Max travels back to the time at which she took the gallery photo, which eventually leads her to various alternative realities. Max travels back to Episode 4, before they head to the party, where Max reveals that Jefferson is the true mastermind. Chloe, still blinded by rage, refuses to let go of her bloodlust towards Nathan. This leads to Max finally revealing she could use photos to travel further through time, and the trauma she had endured through the alternate timelines. This shifts Chloe's fury to pure horror hearing what Max had gone through. Max then tells her that she will not remember anything, and instructs Chloe to relay everything to her, warn David about the Dark Room, and stay at Chloe's fortified house and do nothing.

Max then wakes up at the beach with Chloe, alive and healthy. She quickly embraces her, where Chloe expresses her gratitude to Max for saving her so many times, and says she doesn't blame her if she wants her out of her life, but Max says otherwise and calls herself nobody, to which Chloe reassures her, telling her that she said they would be the most safest at the beach. Chloe stares at the storm, shocked by its power, even calling it Rachel's revenge on the injustice she faced. With the storm growing more aggressive, she urges to head to the lighthouse, but Max begins to fall unconscious, to which Chloe says she has her back. During Max's unconsciousness, Chloe carried her to the lighthouse, whilst Max had a nightmare, combining her insecurities and her traumas, a segment being characters' badmouthing Max in front of her, one of which is Chloe. Hearing these words deeply hurt Max, which causes her to think about their connection, if Max supported her throughout the game, she will realise she has feelings for Chloe. By the time Max wakes up, they will reach the cliff, where they confront their belief that Max brought the storm into existence by saving Chloe from being shot by Nathan earlier in the week. Chloe, knowing what Max has to do, hands her the butterfly photo she took on Monday, to use it to travel back and let her die. Max refuses, not wanting to see Chloe die again, but the latter urges her to do so, saying the former is the only one who can make the choice.

If Max chooses to sacrifice Chloe, they exchange emotional farewells and if you romantically pursued Chloe, share a kiss to affirm their relationship, if not they hug. Before Max uses the photo, Chloe urges Max never to forget their time together, which Max confirms she will never forget. She then travels back to Episode 1 where Chloe gets shot, but Max discards the photo so she doesn't get back to her current position, and no intervention happens, sealing Chloe's fate forever. She is then buried in the Arcadia Bay cemetery.

If Max chooses to sacrifice Arcadia Bay, she takes the photo and rips it up. Chloe and Max then tell each other they will be together forever. The duo proceed to watch Arcadia Bay destroyed holding hands, Max, unwilling to see the destruction, falls into Chloe's arm and sobs as the latter distraughtly watch the town get destroyed. A day later, the two drive through the ruins, and after cheering each other up, leave to start a new life.

Chloe reappears in the remastered Life Is Strange as part of the Life Is Strange Remastered Collection (2022).

=== Life Is Strange: Before the Storm ===
In May 2010, three years before the events of Life Is Strange, sixteen-year-old Chloe Price sneaks into a concert at an old mill. Conflict arises with two men inside, but she escapes with the help of schoolmate Rachel Amber. The next day, Chloe and Rachel reunite at Blackwell Academy and decide to ditch class, hitching a ride on a passing train before getting off at a lookout point. They watch through a viewfinder and see a man and a woman kiss in the park below, which upsets Rachel. They take a walk to a local scrapyard. Chloe confronts Rachel about her change in mood, but she refuses to answer. When Chloe meets Rachel later, Rachel explains that the man the two saw was her father, James, a District Attorney, and that the woman he was kissing was not her mother. Rachel burns a photo of herself and her father, inadvertently causing a wildfire.

The next day, Chloe and Rachel are reprimanded by Principal Wells for ditching school. Chloe hides out at the scrapyard where she finds an old truck in need of repair. She then receives a call from local drug dealer Frank Bowers, who arranges a meeting to discuss settling her debt with him. Chloe agrees to repay him by helping him steal money from her classmate Drew, who owes Frank a large sum. However, Chloe learns that Drew is being violently extorted by another drug dealer, Damon Merrick, and she must decide whether to pay off the dealer with the stolen money to protect Drew or keep it. Later, when a student is unable to participate in the school's theater production of The Tempest due to road closures caused by the wildfire, Chloe reluctantly takes on the role opposite Rachel. After the play, they decide to leave Arcadia Bay with the truck from the scrapyard and return to Rachel's house to pack. Following a confrontation there, James reveals that the woman they saw him kissing was Rachel's biological mother.

Rachel is told that her biological mother, Sera, is a drug addict and that on the day her father kissed her, he rejected Sera's plea to be reunited with Rachel. Chloe vows to find Sera. Chloe contacts Frank, who agrees to meet her at the scrapyard. She repairs the truck there before Rachel arrives. They are ambushed by Frank and Damon, who stabs Rachel after he realizes she is the district attorney's daughter. Surviving the wound, Rachel recovers at the hospital. Chloe continues the search by investigating James' office for clues about Sera. Chloe learns that James is crooked and has been in contact with Damon, she then finds out that Damon has kidnapped Sera. She races to Damon and Sera's location and learns that James wanted him to kill Sera. Frank appears and confronts Damon, presumably killing him. Sera is saved and begs Chloe to never tell Rachel about James' actions, not wanting her relationship with her father to suffer. Back at the hospital, Chloe is faced with a choice: take matters into her own hands by telling Rachel everything or protect her from the truth.

Chloe reappears in the remastered Life Is Strange: Before the Storm as part of the Life Is Strange Remastered Collection (2022).

==== "Farewell" ====
In the bonus chapter of Before the Storm, set in 2008, 13-year-old Max Caulfield struggles to break the news to Chloe that her family is moving to Seattle in three days. The two find a recording of their 8-year-old selves speaking of a "buried treasure"- a time capsule they had made five years prior. After finding a "treasure map" and an "amulet" in the attic, Max and Chloe discover the treasure's spot, only to find that Chloe's dad, William, had put their time capsule in a keg, along with a recording of his voice, for safekeeping. Max can choose to either tell Chloe the truth or hide it; regardless of her decision, their plans for the rest of the day are cut short when Chloe's mother, Joyce, returns home with the news of William's death. Max attends William's funeral days later and leaves for Seattle with her parents immediately after, leaving Chloe in grief.

=== Life Is Strange 2 ===
In July 2017, Chloe is mentioned by David while talking to Sean Diaz. If she was sacrificed in the first game, David explains how his stepdaughter was killed by Nathan, which caused him and Joyce to break up some time ago. If Arcadia Bay was sacrificed instead, Chloe (who left town with Max) eventually got back in touch with David and set aside their differences, as alluded to when Chloe finally acknowledged him as her stepfather instead of a derogatory variation of it. She is also seen in two photographs kept in David's trailer; the photo of him, Joyce, and her in front of their house, and one with her and Max sometime after 2013. After his conversation with Sean, David gets a call from Chloe and takes it in the privacy of his trailer. She and Max either live in or visit New York and had a bad experience with a local, as David reminds her that "New Yorkers are assholes". David also refers to her as "sweetie", and it is inferred she and Max had visited him sometime ago.

=== Life Is Strange: True Colors – "Wavelengths" ===
In the bonus chapter of Life Is Strange: True Colors, "Wavelengths", she is mentioned by Steph Gingrich, the story's main character, who will remember conversations involving her. If the player chose to save Chloe in the first game, while Steph and Mikey are playing a tabletop game, Steph reminiscence their conversations with Chloe, Rachel Amber, Drew North, and Mikey during their days in Arcadia Bay playing tabletop. Later, Steph commented that she was always jealous of Chloe and Rachel's relationship. When she asks if she ever talked with Chloe, Steph responds that she's "off the radar" like her and she was wandering with her other "weirdo" (who is Max). If the player chooses to save Arcadia Bay instead, Steph will reminisce about Mark Jefferson's arrest, police sirens, and the discovery of Rachel's body. While playing tabletop with Mikey, Steph will mention Rachel and Chloe's relationship, how she's jealous of them, and later says that the two don't deserve what happened to them. Mikey also shares his thoughts on both of them.

=== Life Is Strange: Double Exposure ===
Chloe is mentioned by Max throughout the game, either reflecting on her death if sacrificed in Life is Strange or them having since separated if spared. Max also keeps a picture of Chloe from their time together that she considers precious and keeps it in her wallet, with Chloe being referred to by other characters as the "blue-haired girl". Max hears Chloe's voice during specific moments of reflection that compare the traumatic events in Arcadia Bay to Max's situation at Caledon University. Should Arcadia Bay have been sacrificed, Max and Chloe traveled the country together for several years, either remaining best friends or becoming a romantic couple. They eventually parted ways as Chloe had moved on from their time in Arcadia Bay and wanted to keep traveling, while Max couldn't let go of the past and wanted to settle down. Part of their history together is shown through Max's journal entries and text messages, and Chloe periodically posts on the in-game social media "Crosstalk" but remains estranged from Max. At the end of the game, Chloe texts Max and expresses concern after hearing about the storm at Caledon but understands that she may be the last person Max wants to hear from. In the game's closing moments, after choosing to reveal her powers to her friends, Max plans to stop running from her problems and wishes to eventually reconcile with Chloe.

=== Life Is Strange: Reunion ===
Life Is Strange: Reunion follows a 30-year-old Chloe, now the touring manager for the band Drugstore Makeup, reflecting a significant shift in her adult life toward the music industry and a departure from her earlier life in Arcadia Bay. Chloe decides to reunite with Max at Caledon University after being "haunted by nightmares and impossible memories" hoping Max can help her figure out what's going on.

=== Life Is Strange comic series ===
Chloe Price is one of the lead characters in the Life Is Strange comic series, published by Titan Comics. The comic book serves as a sequel to the video game, taking place after the "Sacrifice Arcadia Bay" ending of the original game. Originally conceived as a four-issue limited series, the comic has become an ongoing series, exploring Chloe's relationship with Max.

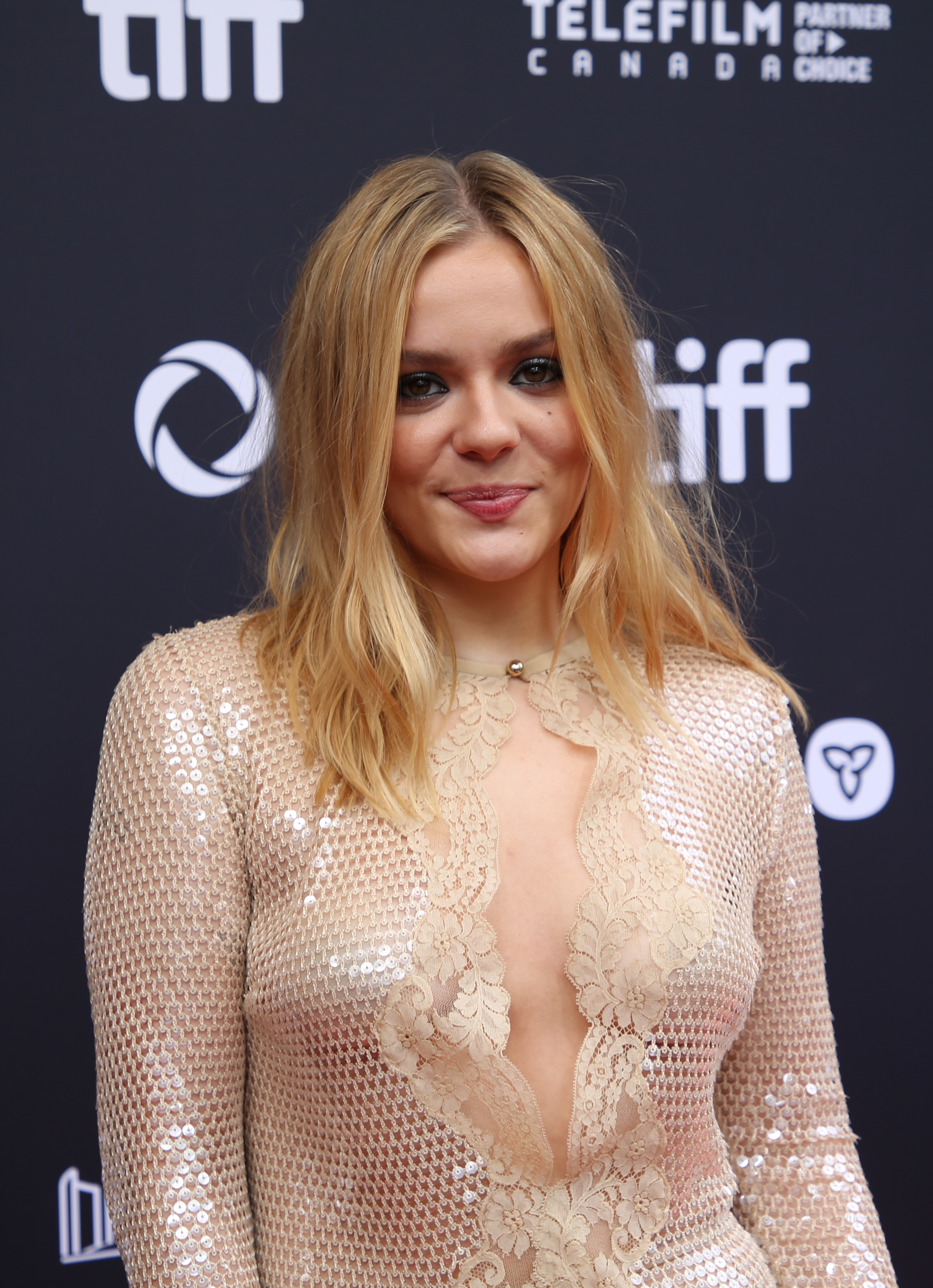
Maisy Stella will portray Chloe Price in the upcoming television series.

=== Television series ===
In March 2026, Maisy Stella was cast as Chloe in the upcoming television adaptation of the 2015 video game for Amazon Prime Video; opposite Tatum Grace Hopkins as Max Caulfield.

== Reception ==
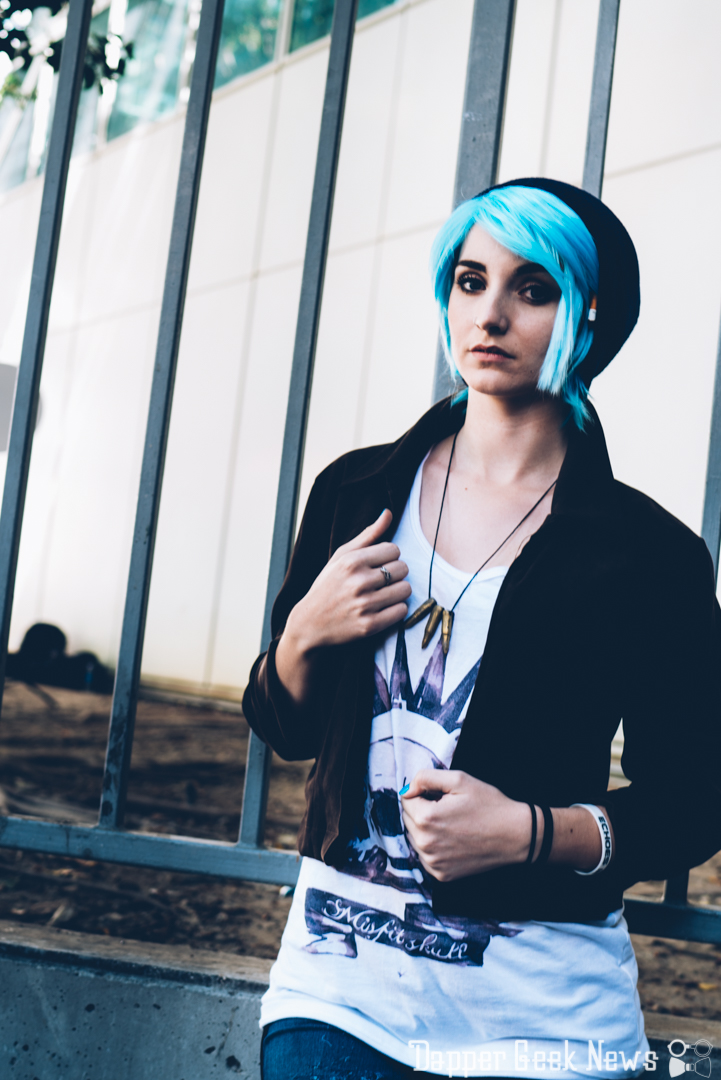
A cosplayer dressed as Chloe from the original Life is Strange.

The character Chloe Price was generally well received by gaming critics. Some gaming reviewers stated that the final episode of Life Is Strange, Polarized, had a "fitting conclusion" to the coming of age story of Chloe Price and that the relationship between the two leads was carried out successfully. Peter Paras of Game Revolution complimented the character beats, particularly the development of Chloe Price, who he said "really comes into her own as [a] fully-formed character." Jeremy Peeples of Hardcore Gamer found Chloe's behaviour as "endearing", claiming that her personality was portrayed with multiple layers. Despite dismissing Chloe early on for being "her same tiresomely combative self," Metro thought Rachel and Chloe's relationship was "the least compelling" aspect of the episode, Wallace thought their "tender moments" were the best parts, and Makedonski said "their struggles, mutual escapism, and sacrifices" provided more than enough investment. Ozzie Mejia of Shacknews relished in Chloe's "genuine growth" contrasting her "fiery spirit". "I'm happy to see a game constructed around a lively young woman who can get a junkyard vehicle functioning, act as an emergency stand-in for Ariel in the "Tempest," and solve a mystery, all while growing up," said The Washington Post, praising the character. Destructoid writer Brett Makedonski said the character characterization was done "to great effect." Metro's Juba, on the other hand, was irritated by Wallace's contemptuous remarks regarding Chloe and Rachel's "forced" friendship.

Chloe was ranked as one of the best video game characters of the 2010s by Polygon staff alongside Max Caulfield; writer Colin Campbell praised their relationship, particularly their differences and how they "bring the best out of each other." TheGamer included Chloe Price on their list of "Iconic Video Game Characters", stating that "there are many characters in the Life Is Strange franchise who are memorable, but the most iconic of them is definitely Chloe Price," while Rachel Weber of GamesRadar ranked Chloe 41st on their list of "50 Iconic Video Game Characters", writing "the sensitive handling of Chloe's mental health and addiction issues makes her not only one of the most iconic characters of the 2010s, but one of the most truly three-dimensional to ever appear in a video game."

Burch was nominated for a BAFTA Award for Best Performance in a Video Game for her role as Chloe.

Chloe was named one of the "Top 100 Greatest Gaming Characters" in the Guinness World Records: Gamer's Edition 2026, ranking at number 40. She is the only character from the Life Is Strange series to appear in the list.
