= Life Is Strange (video game) =

2015 episodic video game

- Cover art featuring the game's protagonist Max Caulfield
- Developer: Dontnod Entertainment (Note: Black Wing Foundation developed the iOS and Android versions. Deck Nine and Black Tower Studios developed the remastered version.)
- Publisher: Square Enix (Note: Feral Interactive developed and published the Linux and OS X version.)
- Directors: Raoul Barbet; Michel Koch
- Producer: Luc Baghadoust
- Designers: Baptiste Moisan; Sebastien Judit; Sebastien Gaillard
- Artists: Michel Koch; Kenny Laurent; Amaury Balandier
- Writers: Christian Divine; Jean-Luc Cano
- Composer: Jonathan Morali
- Series: Life Is Strange
- Engine: Unreal Engine 3 (Note: The iOS, Android and remastered versions use Unreal Engine 4.)
- Platforms: PlayStation 3; PlayStation 4; Windows; Xbox 360; Xbox One; OS X; Linux; iOS; Android; Google Stadia; Nintendo Switch
- Release: Episode 1: Chrysalis; 30 January 2015; Episode 2: Out of Time; 24 March 2015; Episode 3: Chaos Theory; 19 May 2015; Episode 4: Dark Room; 28 July 2015; Episode 5: Polarized; 20 October 2015
- Genre: Adventure
- Mode: Single-player

Life Is Strange is an episodic adventure game developed by Dontnod Entertainment and published by Square Enix. The first installment of the Life Is Strange series, the game was released in five episodes periodically throughout 2015 for PlayStation 3, PlayStation 4, Windows, Xbox 360, and Xbox One. It was ported to OS X and Linux in 2016, and iOS and Android in 2017 and 2018 respectively.

The plot focuses on Max Caulfield, an 18-year-old photography student who discovers that she has the ability to rewind time at any moment, leading her every choice to enact the butterfly effect. She uses this ability to solve the disappearance of a girl named Rachel Amber, and the bizarre tragedies that fall upon the women in her academy. The player's actions can alter the narrative as it unfolds, and the player can in many cases rewind time to choose a different option and thus reshape the story. Fetch quests and making environmental changes represent the forms of puzzle solving in addition to using branching choices for conversation.

Development of the game began in April 2013. It was formed with an episodic structure in mind, for reasons both financial and creative. The developers conducted field research on the setting by traveling to the Pacific Northwest, and subverted known archetypes to make the characters. Player feedback influenced the adjustments made to the episodes. Story and character arc serve as the central point in the game.

Life Is Strange received critical acclaim and was commended for its character development, soundtrack, story, rewind game mechanic, emotional depth, and tackling of taboo subjects. Criticisms included the slang that was used, poor lip-syncing, and tonal inconsistencies in the story. It is considered to be one of the greatest video games of all time, as well an example of video games as an art form. The game garnered over 75 Game of the Year awards and listings, and has reached 20 million players as of November 2023.

A prequel, Life Is Strange: Before the Storm, was released in August 2017, while a remastered version of the game was released as part of the Life Is Strange Remastered Collection in February 2022. A direct sequel, Life Is Strange: Double Exposure, was released in October 2024, with all three titles developed by Deck Nine rather than original developer Dontnod Entertainment.

== Gameplay ==
Players are able to rewind an event within a certain window of time.

Life Is Strange is a graphic adventure played from a third-person view. The player takes control of protagonist Max Caulfield, whose time rewinding ability allows the player to redo almost any action that has been taken. The player can examine and interact with objects, which enables puzzle solving in the form of fetch quests and making changes to the environment. Items that are collected before time travelling are kept in the inventory after the fact.

The player can explore various locations in the fictional setting of Arcadia Bay and communicate with non-playable characters. Dialogue exchanges can be rewound while branching options are used for conversation. Once an event is reset, the details provided earlier are permitted to avail themselves in the future. In some instances, choices in dialogue alter and affect the story through short or long-term consequences. For each one of the choices, something good in the short term could turn out worse later.

== Plot ==
In October 2013, 18-year-old Maxine "Max" Caulfield (Hannah Telle) returns to Arcadia Bay, Oregon, to attend Blackwell Academy. During her photography class with teacher Mark Jefferson (Derek Phillips), Max experiences a vivid and catastrophic precognition of a tornado destroying a lighthouse and approaching the town. Leaving for the restroom to regain her composure, she takes a photograph of a butterfly on her camera, and then witnesses classmate Nathan Prescott (Nik Shriner) shoot and kill a young woman in a fit of rage. In a sudden effort, Max develops the ability to rewind time and saves the woman, revealed to be her childhood friend Chloe Price (Ashly Burch). The two reunite and visit the lighthouse, where Max reveals her powers to Chloe. Strange weather patterns and other anomalies begin occurring throughout Arcadia Bay.

The next day, Max's class is disrupted when Kate Marsh (Dayeanne Hutton), a fellow student who has been bullied over a viral video depicting her kissing several students at a party, attempts suicide by jumping from the roof of the girls’ dormitory. After rewinding time and reaching the roof, Max either saves Kate or fails to convince her not to jump. Following the incident, Max resolves to uncover what happened to Kate and to Chloe's missing friend Rachel Amber. That night, Max and Chloe break into the principal's office, discovering evidence that implicates Nathan. The following morning, they sneak into the motorhome of drug dealer Frank Bowers (Daniel Bonjour), learning that Rachel had been romantically involved with him, a fact she kept from Chloe. Max later examines a childhood photo of herself and Chloe and is unexpectedly transported back to the day it was taken. She prevents Chloe's father, William (Joe Ochman), from dying in a traffic accident, inadvertently creating an alternate reality in which William is alive but Chloe is paralysed from the neck down due to a separate accident. Heartbroken, Max uses the photo to undo her actions and return to the present timeline.

Continuing their investigation, Max and Chloe discover a bunker beneath a derelict barn owned by the Prescotts, where they find binders containing photos of restrained young women. Among the images are photos of Kate and, to their horror, photographs depicting Rachel's corpse being buried. The pair rush to a scrapyard, where they discover Rachel's remains, devastating Chloe. They later attend a school party to confront Nathan, who sends a text message threatening to destroy the evidence. Returning to the scrapyard, they are ambushed by Jefferson, who anaesthetises Max and kills Chloe with a gunshot to the head. Max awakens in the bunker, where Jefferson reveals himself to be a psychopathic serial killer obsessed with abducting and photographing young women, explaining his desire to "capture the moment innocence turns into corruption." He reveals that Nathan had been acting under his influence and had accidentally killed Rachel by overdosing her. Having murdered Nathan himself, Jefferson plans to kill Max once he has completed photographing her.

Max escapes by entering a photo and returns to the beginning of the week during Jefferson's class. She alerts David Madsen (Don McManus), Chloe's stepfather and Blackwell Academy's head of security, preventing Chloe's death and leading to the arrest of both Jefferson and Nathan. Max travels to San Francisco with Principal Wells in Jefferson’s place, where one of her photographs is displayed in an art gallery. While there, she calls Chloe and realizes that the storm has still reached Arcadia Bay. Max returns to the moment she took the winning photo, leading her through multiple collapsing timelines that manifest as a dream-like nightmare.

Reuniting with Chloe at the lighthouse, Max blames her own decision to save Chloe earlier in the week for causing the storm. Having kept Max's butterfly photo, Chloe then offers Max a final choice: use the photo to rewind time and allow Chloe to be killed to save Arcadia Bay, or remain in the current timeline and allow the town's destruction to save Chloe. Chloe believes that there are people in the town who deserve to live rather than die for her own survival, including her mother Joyce, and implores Max to sacrifice her. Max protests, not wanting to lose her, but Chloe urges her to make the choice.

- If Max chooses to sacrifice Chloe, she reluctantly returns to the Blackwell restroom at the beginning of the week where she listens as Nathan shoots Chloe dead. Nathan and Jefferson are arrested, the storm never occurs, and Max attends Chloe's funeral with Joyce, David and the rest of the town.
- If Max chooses to sacrifice Arcadia Bay, she destroys the photo, and she and Chloe watch as the storm devastates the town before dissipating. The next morning, Max and Chloe leave the ruined town together.

== Development ==
Barbet and Koch describe the game and discuss the role of protagonist Max Caulfield.

Development of Life Is Strange began in April 2013 with a team of 15, and more people were added when the collaboration with Square Enix began. The episodes were originally aimed to release about 6 weeks apart. Dontnod co-founder Jean-Maxime Moris was originally the game's Creative Director. Dontnod told Square Enix London about Life Is Strange only after they had turned down a pitch for a larger game. Before signing with Square Enix, Life Is Strange was imagined as a full-length video game that Dontnod would self-publish. However, the publisher surmised that it would be more successful as an episodic title. The game was originally codenamed What If but the name was not used because of the film with the same name.

A developer diary was published before release that said most prospective publishers were unwilling to publish a game unless it had a male protagonist. They said most publishers had the same objection to Dontnod's first project, Remember Me, which also had a female protagonist. Dontnod CEO Oskar Guilbert also challenged the idea at the start. The developers said Square Enix was the only publisher with no intention of changing this.

Life Is Strange was born from the rewind mechanic idea, which the developer had already experimented on with their last game Remember Me. The lead character Max was created with the ability to rewind time to supplement this mechanism. The episodic format was decided upon by the studio for creative reasons, financial restrictions and marketing purposes, allowing them to tell the story in its preferred slow pace. The Pacific Northwest was picked as the setting for the purpose of conveying a nostalgic and autumnal feel. The development team visited the region, took photographs, looked at local newspapers and used Google Street View to make sure the environment was accurately portrayed. It was decided early on that most of the budget be spent on the writing and voice actors. The original story was written in French by Jean-Luc Cano, and converted into a game script by the co-directors and design team. It was subsequently handed over to Christian Divine and Cano to be fine tuned in English. Story and character development were highlighted over point-and-click puzzles, making choice and consequence integral to how the narrative unfolds. Hannah Telle auditioned for Max Caulfield in July 2014 and was offered the part; Ashly Burch auditioned for both Max and her given role Chloe Price. The recording sessions were done in Los Angeles, California, with the French developer brought in via Skype.

The game has been compared to Remember Me, which holds significant differences but addresses similar themes of memory and identity. Life Is Strange was specified as an analogue look at human identity in contrast to Remember Me, the digital view of the same theme. Running on an improved version of Unreal Engine 3, it makes use of the tools and special effects like lighting and depth of field engineered for Remember Me as well as subsequent advances. Visual effects like post-processes, double exposure and overlapping screen space particles were used as an artistic approach to be displayed while the lead character rewinds time. The textures seen in the game were entirely hand painted, adapted to achieve what art director Michel Koch called "impressionistic rendering". Elements were adjusted based on player feedback, with influences like The Walking Dead, Gone Home (Note: Dontnod started working on the game before Gone Home was released.) and Heavy Rain in mind. Additional sources of inspiration include the visual novel Danganronpa, in terms of balancing gameplay and story, and the novel The Catcher in the Rye, whose protagonist Holden Caulfield shares a surname with Max, the game's lead. The characters were created using known archetypes, at first to establish an entry point for the player, and then to subvert them. For the sake of serving the realism, the supernatural elements were designed as a metaphor for the characters' inner conflict, and experts were consulted to tackle the subject of teen suicide. The score was composed by Jonathan Morali of the band Syd Matters. Inspired by modern indie folk music, the soundtrack was intended to inform the mood. The music contains a blend of licensed tracks and composed pieces. Featured artists include José González, Mogwai, Breton, Amanda Palmer, Brian Viglione, Bright Eyes, Message to Bears, Local Natives, Syd Matters, Sparklehorse, Angus & Julia Stone, alt-J, Mud Flow and Foals.

== Release ==
Square Enix announced Life Is Strange at Gamescom on 11 August 2014. The episodes were released digitally on PC via Steam, PlayStation 3 and PlayStation 4 via PlayStation Network, and Xbox 360 and Xbox One via Xbox Live between 30 January 2015 and 20 October 2015. Two season pass options were available for reduced prices, one with episode 1-5 and one with episode 2-5. A demo of the first 20 minutes was released simultaneously with episode 1 for consoles and later for PC. In November 2014, the publisher said they were interested in releasing physical copies of the game, but said that at that time they were "100 per cent focused on the digital release". One year later, the retail edition was set to be released for the PC, PS4 and Xbox One in North America on 19 January 2016 and in Europe on 22 January 2016; the limited edition had an artbook, the soundtrack, score, and a director's commentary. The director's commentary was also released as a free DLC. A Japanese dubbed version was released for Microsoft Windows, PlayStation 3 and PlayStation 4 on 3 March 2016. Feral Interactive ported Life Is Strange for OS X, released on 16 June 2016, and Linux, released on 21 July 2016. That same day, the first episode was made indefinitely available for free on Linux, Windows, OS X, PS3, PS4, Xbox 360 and Xbox One. Life Is Strange was included on PlayStation Plus (for America and PAL regions) the month of June 2017. It was released for iOS between 14 December 2017 and 29 March 2018, and launched on Android on 18 July 2018, both ported by Black Wing Foundation.

== Reception ==
Aggregate review scores
Game	Metacritic
Complete Season	(PC) 83/100 (PS4) 85/100 (XONE) 85/100 (iOS) 83/100
Episode 1: Chrysalis	(PC) 77/100 (PS4) 75/100 (XONE) 77/100
Episode 2: Out of Time	(PC) 77/100 (PS4) 78/100 (XONE) 73/100
Episode 3: Chaos Theory	(PC) 80/100 (PS4) 81/100 (XONE) 80/100
Episode 4: Dark Room	(PC) 76/100 (PS4) 81/100 (XONE) 74/100
Episode 5: Polarized	(PC) 83/100 (PS4) 81/100 (XONE) 80/100

Life Is Strange received critical acclaim. (Note: Attributed to multiple references:) Metacritic reported that critical reception consisted of "generally favorable reviews". While some reviewers criticised the games's lip-syncing and use of dated slang, they lauded the character development and time travel component, suggesting that there should be more games like it. Eurogamer said it was "one of the best interactive story games of this generation" and Hardcore Gamer said it was the sleeper hit of 2015. Legendary Entertainment stated it received over 75 Game of the Year awards and listings. In April 2017, Xbox One UK ranked it first in its list of Xbox One games priced under £20. Game director Yoko Taro listed it as one of his favourite PlayStation 4 games.

Kevin VanOrd of GameSpot said Episode 1: Chrysalis (Note: The subtitle Chrysalis alludes to the transitional stage of butterflies as pupae, before they emerge into adulthood.) is "an involving slice of life that works because its situations eloquently capture a peculiar early-college state of mind", while Game Informer's Kimberley Wallace said the game's tackling of "subjects that are usually taboo for video games" was impressive. Destructoid's Brett Makedonski said the episode's strongest characteristic was exploration—both "self- and worldly". Mitch Dyer of IGN said the story was ultimately obstructed by its "laughable" script and "worse performances". In response to Episode 2: Out of Time, Polygon's Megan Farokhmanesh also said that the emphasis on self-exploration had considerable impact on the enjoyment of the game. Other critics said the ending was an "emotional high point" and that it brought meaning to the choices from both the first and second episodes. Mike Williams said in USgamer that the pacing of Episode 2: Out of Time was "slower and less exciting" than that of episode one. PopMatters' Eric Swain described the episode as generally sincere but containing moments that strained credibility.

Adnan Riaz of Hardcore Gamer said Episode 3: Chaos Theory was a dramatic improvement that presented a "thrilling, poignant, fascinating and ... enticing" narrative whose outcome from past decisions also added a sense of realism. Peter Paras of Game Revolution complimented the character beats, particularly the development of Chloe Price, who he said "really comes into her own as [a] fully-formed character". Though GameSpot's Alexa Ray Corriea said that the fetch quests interfered with its emotional quality, the episode built up to a "killer cliffhanger" according to Farokhmanesh. GameZone's Matt Liebl said Episode 4: Dark Room was "easily the most emotional episode" and that the mystery of Rachel Amber had done a "tremendous job in keeping us hooked". Tom Hoggins of The Telegraph said the developer's venture into subjects like social division, online bullying, parental conflict and suicide were "bold". Critics said there were tonal problems, caused by the game's "cheap ways" of progressing the plot, such as character inconsistency and superfluous shock value. Critics were more favourable towards the episode's puzzles and relationships. They said the final episode, Polarized, had a "fitting conclusion" to the coming of age story of Max Caulfield and the relationship between the two leads was carried out successfully. One stealth sequence was described as "tedious" and "out-of-place" while other aspects inhabiting the same course of events were favoured. Reviewers were divided on the ending.

=== Sales ===
Life Is Strange reached one million sales in July 2015, having accumulated over 1.2 million unique players worldwide; the attach rate to units between the complete season and season pass proved to be "extremely strong", divulged Square Enix. The retail edition made seventh place in the top ten UK game sales chart for the week ending 23 January 2016. As of May 2017, it was purchased by 3 million unique players. By November 2023, the game had garnered "20 million total players".

=== Awards ===
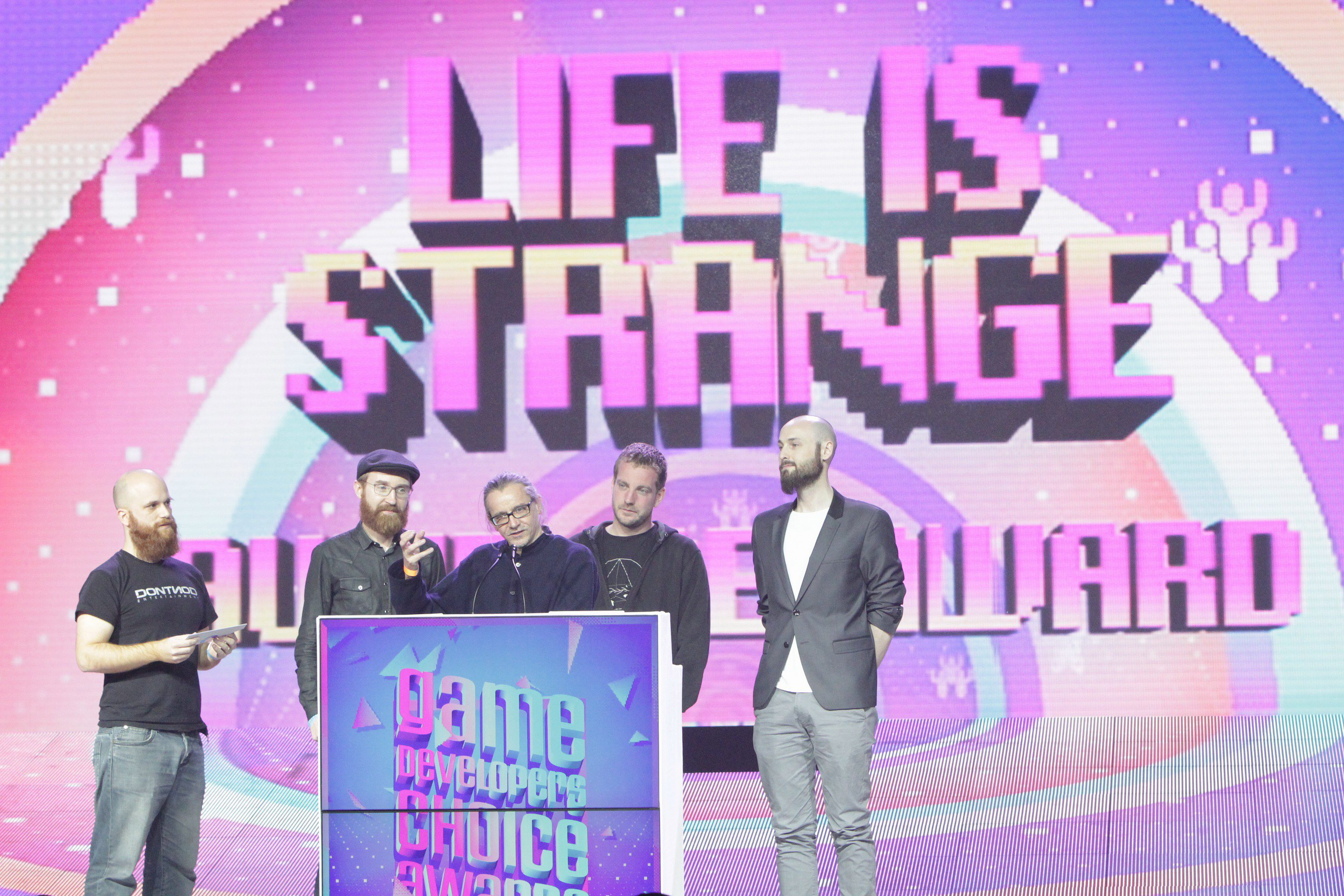
The developers accept the audience award at the 2016 GDC Awards.

In 2015, PlayStation Official Magazine recognized Life Is Strange in its Best Episodic Adventure category and Episode 2's conclusion in the Best Moment category. The end of Episode 2 was also runner-up for Best Moment or Sequence in Giant Bomb's 2015 Game of the Year Awards. The game ranked first on Vulture's Top 10 video games of 2015, second on Red Bull Games' Top 10 video games of 2015, fourth on Vice Canada's Top 20 video games of 2015, seventh on Polygon's Games of the Year 2015, eighth on Ars Technica's best video games of 2015, and tenth on Eurogamer's Top 10 video games of 2015 lists. New Statesman also named it Best Game on their Top 10 video games of 2015 list, while Apple labeled it Game of the Year at its Best of 2016 awards. At Destructoid's Best of 2015 Awards, Life Is Strange was nominated for Best Xbox One Game. It was runner-up for Best Adventure Game at Hardcore Gamer's Best of 2015 Awards. PlayStation Blog's Best of 2015 nominated the game for Best PS4 Game, and chose it as runner-up in the Best Story, Best Soundtrack, and Best Digital-Only Release classifications. It won New Games IP – PC/console and Use of Narrative at the Develop Industry Excellence Awards in 2015. At the Global Game Awards, Episode 1 won Best Adventure and Best Original Game, and came in second place for Best Story and Game of the Year.

Year	Award	Category	Recipient(s) and nominee(s)	Result	Ref.
2015	Golden Joystick Awards	Best Original Game	Life Is Strange	Runner-up	
2015	Golden Joystick Awards	Best Storytelling	Life Is Strange	Runner-up	
2015	Golden Joystick Awards	Best Audio	Life Is Strange	Runner-up	
2015	Golden Joystick Awards	Best Gaming Moment	Saving Kate	Third	
2015	Golden Joystick Awards	Performance of the Year	Ashly Burch as Chloe	Won	
2015	Golden Joystick Awards	Game of the Year	Life Is Strange	Third	
2015	The Game Awards	Best Narrative	Life Is Strange	Nominated	
2015	The Game Awards	Best Performance	Ashly Burch as Chloe	Nominated	
2015	The Game Awards	Games for Impact	Life Is Strange	Won	
2016	D.I.C.E. Awards	Adventure Game of the Year	Life Is Strange	Nominated	
2016	D.I.C.E. Awards	Outstanding Achievement in Character	Max Caulfield	Nominated	
2016	D.I.C.E. Awards	Outstanding Achievement in Game Direction	Life is Strange	Nominated	
2016	Game Developers Choice Awards	Audience Award	Life is Strange	Won	
2016	SXSW Gaming Awards	Excellence in Narrative	Life is Strange	Nominated	
2016	SXSW Gaming Awards	Most Promising New Intellectual Property	Life is Strange	Nominated	
2016	SXSW Gaming Awards	Matthew Crump Cultural Innovation Award	Life is Strange	Nominated	
2016	National Academy of Video Game Trade Reviewers	Art Direction, Contemporary	Life is Strange	Nominated	
2016	National Academy of Video Game Trade Reviewers	Character Design	Life is Strange	Won	
2016	National Academy of Video Game Trade Reviewers	Direction in a Game Cinema	Life is Strange	Nominated	
2016	National Academy of Video Game Trade Reviewers	Game Design, New IP	Life is Strange	Nominated	
2016	National Academy of Video Game Trade Reviewers	Original Light Mix Score, New IP	Life is Strange	Won	
2016	National Academy of Video Game Trade Reviewers	Song, Original or Adapted	Life Is Strange – "To All of You"	Won	
2016	National Academy of Video Game Trade Reviewers	Song Collection	Life Is Strange	Nominated	
2016	National Academy of Video Game Trade Reviewers	Writing in a Drama	Life Is Strange	Nominated	
2016	National Academy of Video Game Trade Reviewers	Game, Original Adventure	Life Is Strange	Nominated	
2016	British Academy Games Awards	Best Game	Life Is Strange	Nominated	
2016	British Academy Games Awards	Game Innovation	Life Is Strange	Nominated	
2016	British Academy Games Awards	Original Property	Life Is Strange	Nominated	
2016	British Academy Games Awards	Performer	Ashly Burch	Nominated	
2016	British Academy Games Awards	Story	Life Is Strange	Won	
2016	Peabody-Facebook Futures of Media Awards	Excellence and Innovation in Digital Storytelling	Life Is Strange	Won	
2016	The Games for Change Awards	Game of the Year	Life Is Strange	Won	
2016	The Games for Change Awards	Most Significant Impact	Life Is Strange	Won	
2016	The Games for Change Awards	Best Gameplay	Life Is Strange	Nominated	
2016	The Games for Change Awards	Most Innovative	Life Is Strange	Nominated	
2016	Japan Game Awards	Game Designers Award	Life Is Strange	Won	
2016	Steam Awards	"I'm Not Crying, There's Something In My Eye"	Life Is Strange	Nominated	

== Legacy and impact ==
Retropectively, Life Is Strange is considered to be one of the greatest video games of all time. After the game achieved critical and commercial success, Dontnod Entertainment started to become more prominent in the video game industry; publishers pursued the studio for the first time, whereas they previously had to pursue publishers themselves. CEO Oskar Guilbert said that the game saved his company financially after the mediocre sales of Remember Me. The Washington Post noted it as passing the "Steven Spielberg test" for video games as an art form – that "video games will prove their worth as a potent storytelling art form 'when somebody confesses that they cried at level 17.'" – in their review. Fans speculated and made theories about the plot, as well as predicting part of a possible ending. Some publications have ranked this game as one of the best video games of all time.

In 2016, Square Enix sponsored its own "Everyday Heroes" photography contest, inspired by the game, offering a US$10,000 scholarship for the winning entry. Square Enix also coordinated with Parent Advocacy Coalition for Educational Rights (PACER) to support an anti-bullying initiative based on themes within the game and donated a total amount of $25,000.

Life Is Strange: Before the Storm, a prequel developed by Deck Nine, launched on 31 August 2017. Other games in the series featuring new locations and characters include Life Is Strange 2, released in September 2018, three months after the launch of its free spin-off The Awesome Adventures of Captain Spirit, (Note: Attributed to multiple references:) and Life Is Strange: True Colors, released in September 2021.

A comic book series of the same name, set after the "Sacrifice Arcadia Bay" ending of the game, was released by Titan Comics beginning November 2018. The comic is written by Emma Vieceli, with interior and cover art by Claudia Leonardi and colours by Andrea Izzo. Square Enix also partnered with Titan Comics to produce Life Is Strange: Welcome to Blackwell Academy, a tie-in book about Blackwell Academy and the town of Arcadia Bay, written by Matt Forbeck.

Remastered versions of Life Is Strange and Before the Storm were released in February 2022 as Life Is Strange Remastered Collection on PlayStation 4, Xbox One, Microsoft Windows, Google Stadia and at a later date on Nintendo Switch. The remaster includes previously released content with updated visuals and gameplay puzzles, improved character animation, engine and lighting upgrades, and full facial motion capture.

Developed by Deck Nine, Life Is Strange: Double Exposure features an older Max Caulfield who discovers the ability to experience two parallel timelines simultaneously as she tries to prevent the murder of her friend Safi. It was released on 29 October 2024, for Xbox Series X/S, PlayStation 5, and PC.

== Television series ==
In July 2016, Legendary Digital Studios and Square Enix announced that they would be adapting Life Is Strange as a digital series. At the time of the announcement, they were meeting with potential writers for the series adaptation, which would be set in Arcadia Bay. In 2017, dj2 Entertainment sold the rights to the series to streaming service Hulu.

In September 2025, it was announced that Amazon Prime Video had acquired the rights to adapt the game and greenlit the series for production. Charlie Covell is set to serve as showrunner and executive produce alongside Dmitri M. Johnson, Michael Lawrence Goldberg, and Timothy I. Stevenson, with Square Enix, Story Kitchen, LuckyChap, and Amazon MGM Studios producing the series. In March 2026, Maisy Stella and Tatum Grace Hopkins were cast as Chloe and Max, respectively. Filming for the series wrapped up in October 2026; Koch, Cano, and Baghadoust visited the set.
