= Rachel Amber =

Video game character

- Life Is Strange character
- Rachel Amber as shown in Before the Storm
- First appearance: Life Is Strange (2015)
- Created by: Jean-Luc Cano; Michel Koch; Raoul Barbet; (Don't Nod)
- Portrayed by: Kylie Brown (Before the Storm); Esther McGregor (TV series)

In-universe information
- Full name: Rachel Dawn Amber
- Occupation: High school student
- Family: James Amber (father); Sera Gearhardt (biological mother); Rose Amber (step-mother)
- Origin: Arcadia Bay, Oregon, US

Rachel Dawn Amber is a character in the Life Is Strange video game series, published by Square Enix. Created by French developer Dontnod Entertainment for the original 2015 game, her character was expanded upon by Deck Nine in the prequel Life Is Strange: Before the Storm (2017), in which she is voiced by Kylie Brown.

Rachel is introduced in Life Is Strange as a popular and enigmatic student, and the former best friend of Chloe Price. Like Max Caulfield, she attended Blackwell Academy but has disappeared prior to Max's enrollment; this mystery serves as one of the game's central plot elements. In Life Is Strange: Before the Storm, Rachel serves as a supporting character to Chloe as the two form a close bond, which can be played as romantic.

Rachel's character was regarded as an important thematic element in the original Life Is Strange, and her portrayal in Before the Storm was generally well received by critics, attracting a significant fan following. However, some were dissatisfied with the original game's reveal that she had been kidnapped and murdered, describing it as an LGBT variation of the "women in refrigerators" trope.

Esther McGregor is set to portray Rachel in the upcoming television adaptation for Amazon Prime Video.

== Concept and development ==
Michel Koch, the co-director and art director, stated in a January 2016 interview with Shacknews: "We really wanted to push [Rachel Amber as] this mysterious character that you never see. We really tried to create her and have characters talk about her to the point that she was in the game, even if you never see her. We really have her be one of the main characters, but one that's never seen." Koch also stated that DontNod wanted her character arc to subvert favored plot directions by audiences, since the game was "about real life" and "not a fantasy game".

After publisher Square Enix chose Deck Nine to develop a Life Is Strange game, the developers chose a prequel expanding upon the plot threads established within the original game. Within Before the Storm, they wanted to focus upon and establish Rachel Amber's relationship with Chloe Price, with Kylie Brown voicing the character. In a November 2017 interview with Engadget, Deck Nine's game director Chris Floyd stated that the team wanted to establish "that she was lovable. Extremely lovable, especially as we're seeing her through Chloe's eyes. And yet, we also know a lot of troubling things about her from season one. So we had to include a touch of that as well."

In a March 2018 interview with Game Informer, Deck Nine lead writer Zak Garriss stated that the development of Rachel was "one of the biggest challenges in Before the Storm as a whole. We had instruction from the first game in that her absence from the story and characters' lives was felt. You could talk to every character, especially in the first episode, and someone would have something to say about Rachel." He noted that it was a challenge to build her "as a compelling character. We just did our best with it. But it was fun. I think we all thought and wrote about people we've met in our lives that defined chapters for whatever reason. Your first love, the person who breaks your heart, someone who says something at just the right time and place to change the way you think about a fundamental facet of your life. We all have these people and we really focused on that and drew on that in building and creating Rachel." Garris stated that the team wanted to leave it deliberately ambiguous on whether Rachel possessed some form of powers similar to that of other characters within the series. Saying that they wanted the story to primarily focus on "her ability to light Chloe up and change the spaces that she's in... [that] is really her gift".

== Appearances ==
Rachel is introduced in Life Is Strange as an affluent and popular yet enigmatic student of Blackwell Academy and the best friend of Chloe Price. Prior to the story's beginning, she mysteriously disappeared and has been so for six months. Her disappearance, which Price and Max Caulfield endeavour to solve, acts as a major plot element. Throughout the town of Arcadia Bay, missing persons posters depicting Rachel, including those put up by Price, are seen. Although many within the town initially dismiss concern about her situation, believing that she ran away from her parents to Los Angeles, it is gradually revealed through Caulfield and Price's investigation that her disappearance was the result of malicious activity. Eventually, her body is discovered by the two at the Arcadia Bay junkyard. It is revealed that she had been kidnapped by Jefferson and student Nathan Prescott, dying of a drug overdose. It is considered by some, that it's left ambiguous as to who killed Rachel and whether her death was intentional, However, Jefferson clearly states that Nathan wanted to impress him, drugged Rachel for a photo session and "accidentally" killing her. Additionally, Jefferson is implied to have had an illicit romantic or sexual relationship with Rachel.

Rachel is developed further in the prequel Life Is Strange: Before The Storm, set three years before the original game, where she forms a relationship with Chloe, which is optionally romantic. A post-credit scene shows Chloe calling Rachel's phone seventeen times without a response, while multiple camera clicks are heard in the background.

=== Comic series ===
Rachel is one of the main characters in the Life Is Strange comic series, published by Titan Comics. The comic-book serves as a sequel to the video game, taking place after the "Sacrifice Arcadia Bay" ending of the original game.

=== Television series ===
In June 2026, Esther McGregor was cast as Rachel in the upcoming television adaptation of the 2015 video game for Amazon Prime Video.

== Reception and analysis ==
The portrayal of Chloe and Rachel's relationship in Before the Storm has been cited by several publications, including Gayming Magazine, as a positive example of LGBT relationships in gaming.

Critics including Kotaku noted her character as an intentional allusion or subversion of the manic pixie dream girl archetype. Paste named her one of the best video game characters of 2017 for her portrayal in Before the Storm, calling it a strange but sentimental experience, and stating that "beautiful moments spent with her feel all the more precious, almost solemn, for the knowledge of what's to come."

Scholar of English Renee Ann Drouin notes the devotion of numerous characters in Life is Strange to missing queer Rachel Amber. When it becomes clear that she "has been kidnapped, murdered, and potentially raped", Rachel appears as "the subject of a queer trauma archive [an in-game collection of notes and artefacts], possesses a dual role of spectre and centrepiece. Haunting the archive, she is voiceless; details about her come second hand, and there are limited artefacts to compose her history. Players cannot fully understand her sexuality without the biased influence of Chloe, who is in love with her, or the prequel game, Life Is Strange: Before the Storm."

Reviewer Tim McDonald found that the series' strength of allowing "for alternative character interpretations" by showing different sides of the characters is realised for Rachel Amber only in Before the Storm: There she appears as "a free spirit who has a legitimate love for and kinship with Chloe, but maybe doesn't entirely think things through", but a darker manipulative streak with "sudden outbursts and irrational behaviour" is also shown. Emily Brown from PC Gamer remarked that while Rachel was more a plot device in Life is Strange, the prequel presents her as "a fully fleshed out and complex character, making the later events of Life is Strange even more tragic".

Arts scholar Mark Kaethler points out that the root of the devastating storm in Life is Strange lies in "Rachel's fury at her father's supposed infidelity", as transported by her performance of Prospero in The Tempest depicted in Before the Storm. When Rachel's deviation from the play's text serves to advance her relationship with Chloe, Kaethler sees two developments in play: "the romantic union between Rachel and Chloe" is "a chrono-normative bond that develops through heteronormative conventions: their love story's arc could be said to mirror teenage heteronormative fantasies. On the other hand, however, this can only be accomplished through queering the Shakespearean text."

Dramatics researcher Jonathan Partecke characterizes Rachel Amber as "confident, exciting, tantalizing", a "charismatic allrounder", and assigns her the type of fille fatale. He calls her a "hyper ideal" of rebellious "independent young women, who "truly life their live"", which may be designed to instill a last-minute panic of "never having rebelled as "well"" in the viewer. In Life Is Strange Rachel seems a perfect person exactly because she is not present. Before the Storm transforms this "mythos to a character", the "cold ideal" becomes a human with faults, and it is this humanity that makes her a likeable figure.

The conclusion of Rachel's storyline in Life Is Strange, which it is revealed that she had been kidnapped and subsequently murdered, received negative response from critics and scholars; with Rock Paper Shotgun's Jessica Castello citing it as an LGBT variation of the "women in refrigerators" trope. Criticisms of Rachel's narrative include it was exploitative, simplistic, sensational, and cliché. Drouin countered that "Chloe's attachment of Rachel" is one of the elements showing that "the Life Is Strange universe equally hinges upon female devotion". Castello argued that it undercut the emotional impact of Life Is Strange: Before the Storm, saying that while "Deck Nine did an admirable job in telling Chloe and Rachel's story" it ultimately rendered a story in which... "When bad things happen to them, it just feels unfair because we already know that they suffer enough. When they're happy, it's only a reminder that it will be all too fleeting."
