= Tatum Grace Hopkins =

American actress (born 2005)

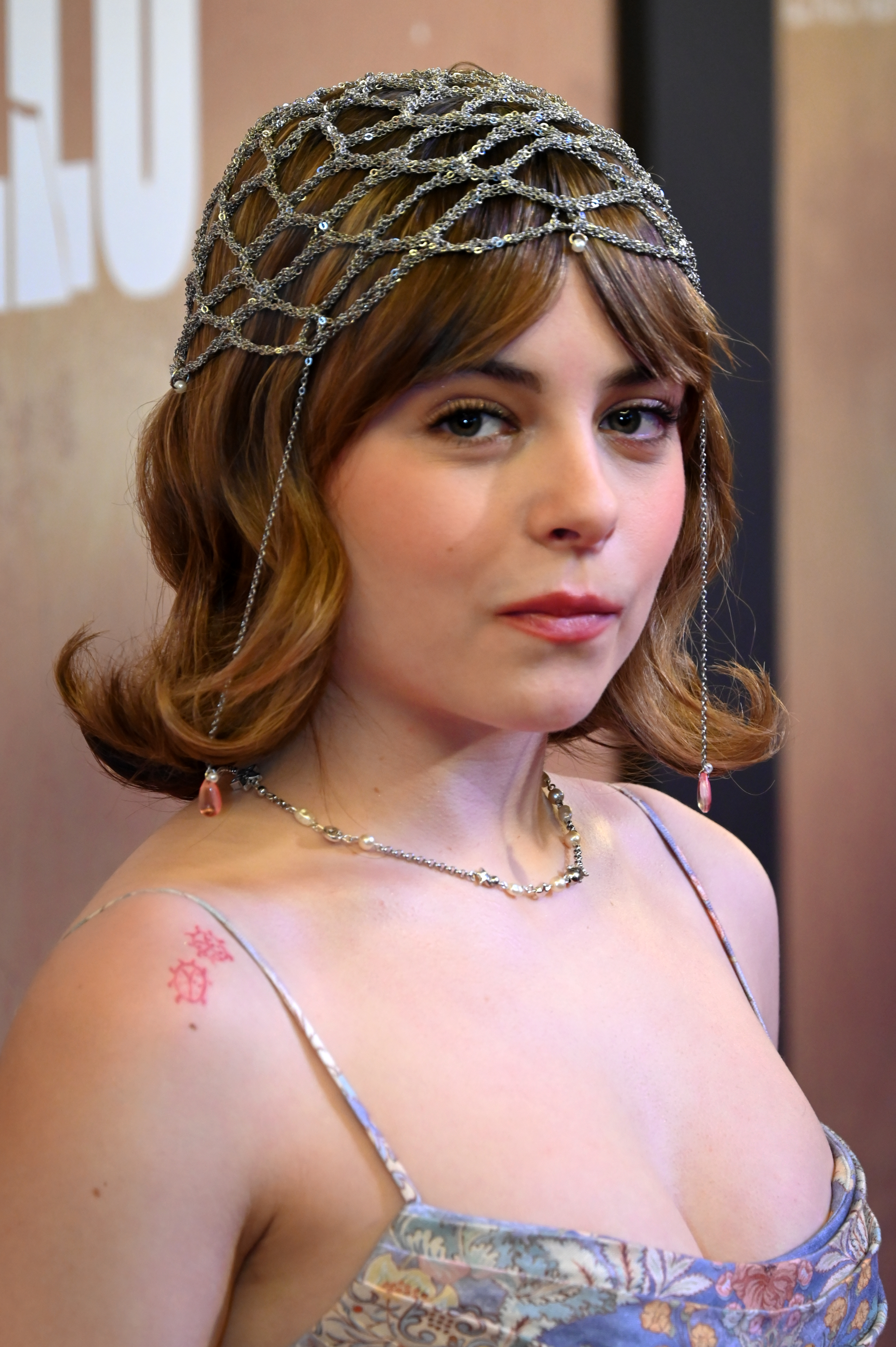
- Hopkins at the Broadway premiere of The Queen of Versailles, 2025
- Born: January 28, 2005 (age 21); Shawnee, Oklahoma, U.S.
- Occupation: Actress
- Years active: 2024–present

Tatum Grace Hopkins (born January 28, 2005) is an American actress.

== Early life ==
Hopkins is the daughter of Matt and Shelli Hopkins and grew up in Shawnee, Oklahoma. The summer before starting high school, she attended Broadway Bootcamp, a theater camp in Oklahoma, where she impressed the program's director, Broadway star Kristin Chenoweth. Also encouraged by the camp's vocal coach, she and her mother moved to Nyack, New York, so she could access a higher level of training closer to New York City. She played several leading roles at Nyack High School, including Little Sally in Urinetown, Sophie in Mamma Mia!, and Audrey in Little Shop of Horrors. In 2023, she won the Roger Rees and Metropolitan High School Theater Awards for her performance in Little Shop.

== Career ==
In July 2024, Hopkins originated the role of Jonquil in Stephen Schwartz's The Queen of Versailles alongside Kristin Chenoweth and F. Murray Abraham at the Emerson Colonial Theatre in Boston. Schwartz thought she would be a good choice for the role after seeing her perform in concert with Chenoweth, and director Michael Arden agreed after she auditioned while the play was being workshopped. In November 2025, Hopkins made her Broadway debut when Versailles moved to the St. James Theatre.

In March 2026, Hopkins was cast as Max Caulfield in the upcoming TV series Life Is Strange, based on the 2015 video game of the same name.

== Filmography ==
=== Film ===
Year	Title	Role	Notes
2024	Meek	Hailey	Short film

=== Television ===
Year	Title	Role	Notes
TBA	Life Is Strange	Max Caulfield	Lead role

=== Stage ===
Year	Title	Role	Notes	Ref.
2024–2025	The Queen of Versailles	Jonquil Peed	Emerson Colonial Theatre; St. James Theatre	
