= Dmitri M. Johnson =

American film producer (born 1980)

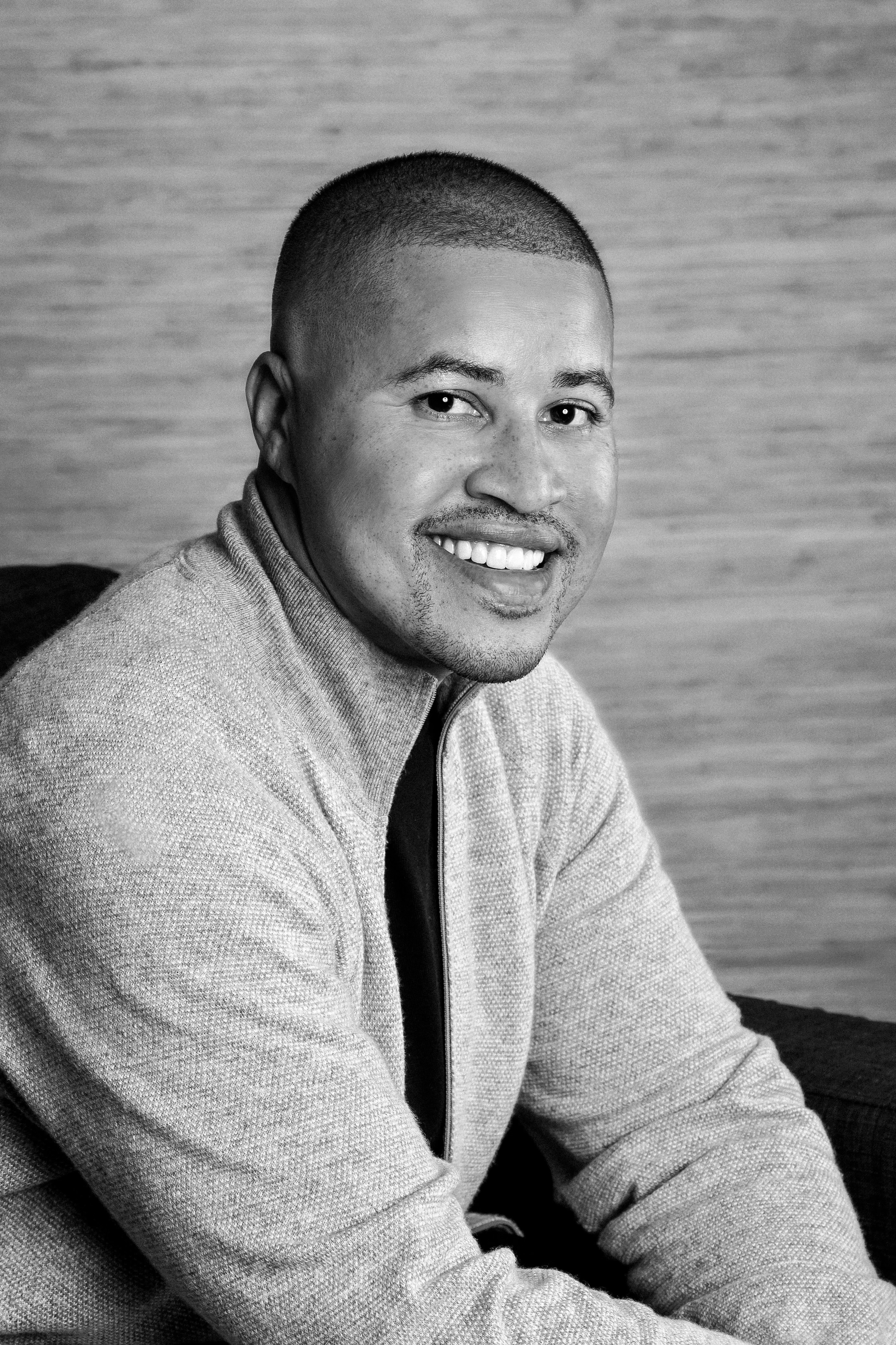
- Born: December 11, 1980 (age 45); San Diego, California, U.S.
- Education: Chapman University; The Bishop's School
- Occupations: Film production; Television production
- Employer: Story Kitchen
- Agent: WME
- Board member of: BAFTA
- Website: story-kitchen.com

Dmitri M. Johnson is an American film producer. He is a co-founder of Story Kitchen (formerly dj2 Entertainment), alongside Michael Lawrence Goldberg.

== History ==
Dmitri M. Johnson (born in San Diego, California) graduated from Chapman University with a Bachelor of Fine Arts in Film Production, in 2003.

In the 2000s Johnson started his entertainment career at Gotham Group. In 2011, Johnson pivoted to full-time producing by co-founding dj2 Entertainment (alongside Dan Jevons).

=== Story Kitchen ===
Story Kitchen Logo

In 2022, Johnson co-launched Story Kitchen, an American independent production company focused on adapting videogames, and other 'non-traditional' IPs, into film and television. Story Kitchen currently has a television first-look deal with Amazon MGM Studios as well as an animated film first-look deal with DreamWorks Animation.

In 2025, Story Kitchen renewed their first-look television deal with Amazon MGM Studios until 2028.

== Filmography ==
=== Films ===
==== As producer ====
- Sonic the Hedgehog (2020)
- Sonic the Hedgehog 2 (2022)
- Sonic the Hedgehog 3 (2024)

=== Television ===
==== As executive producer ====
- Rival Peak (2020)
- Tomb Raider: The Legend of Lara Croft (2024–25)
- Life Is Strange (TBA)
- Tomb Raider (TBA)

== Panels ==
- Games for Change: "Games, Hollywood, and Impact"
- Global Tech Weekend Tbilisi: "Shaping the New Era"
- Screen Play / London Games
- SXSW: "Transmedia is Back – But What Comes Next?"
- XDS External Development Summit: "BAFTA Presents "Franchise Farming" with Story Kitchen — When, How, and with Whom to Grow a Game IP into Film/TV, Animation, and Beyond"
