= Maisy Stella =

Canadian singer and actress (born 2003)

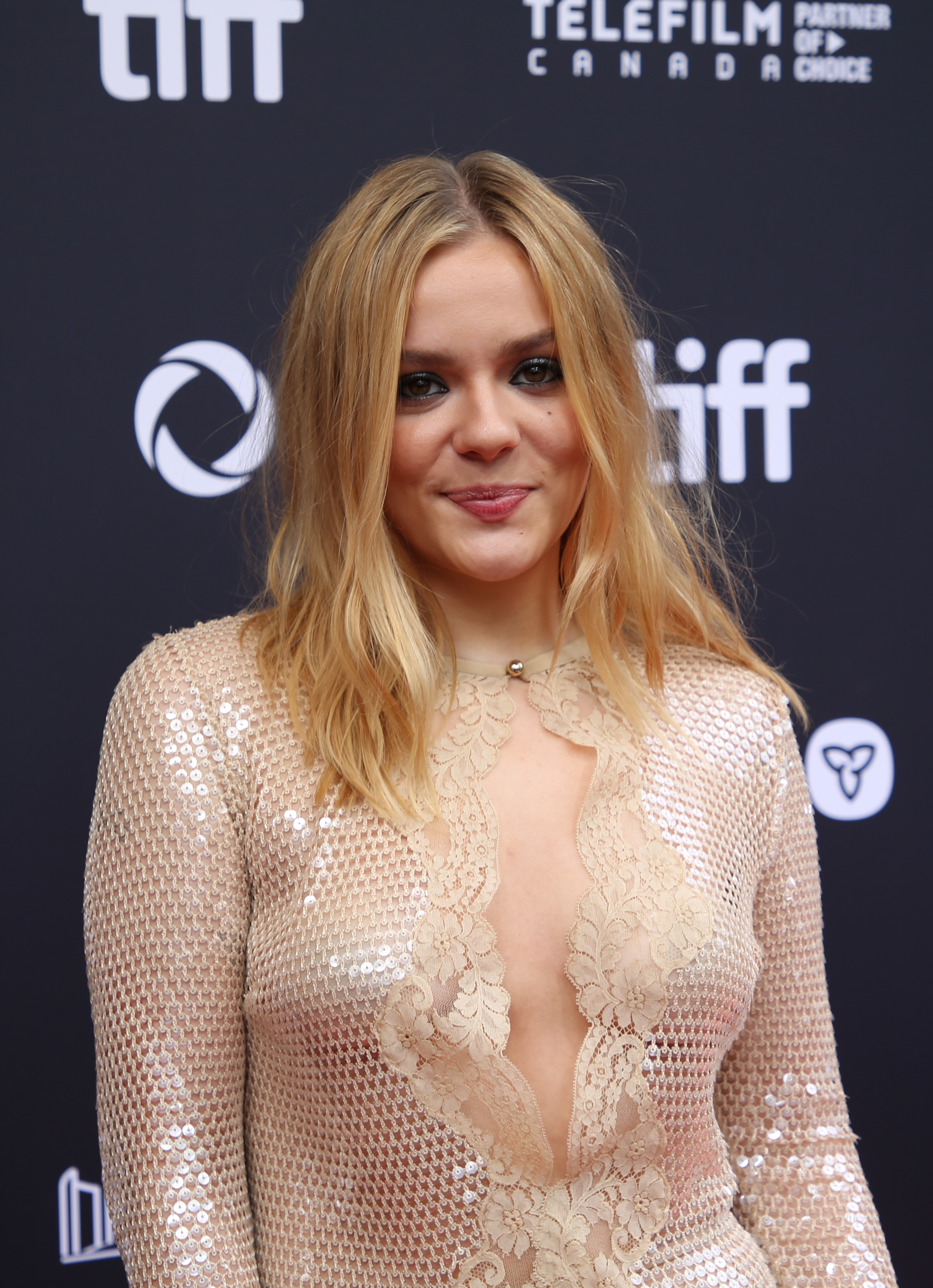
- Stella at the 2025 Toronto International Film Festival
- Born: December 13, 2003 (age 22); Oshawa, Ontario, Canada
- Occupations: Singer; actress
- Years active: 2012–present
- Parents: Brad Stella (father); MaryLynne Stella (mother)
- Relatives: Lennon Stella (sister)
- Musical career
- Genres: Pop; indie pop; country
- Instrument: Vocals
- Formerly of: Lennon & Maisy

Maisy Stella (born December 13, 2003) is a Canadian singer and actress. Her accolades include a Critics' Choice Movie Award and an Independent Spirit Award.

Stella started her career in 2009 and gained early attention as half of the country music cover band Lennon & Maisy, alongside her elder sister Lennon. From 2012 to 2018, they starred together as sisters on the musical television series Nashville, for which they also contributed to the soundtrack discography.

In 2017, Stella released her debut solo song, "Riding Free", for the soundtrack of the animated series Spirit Riding Free. In 2024, she returned to acting and received greater recognition for her leading role in Megan Park's coming-of-age film My Old Ass (2024), for which she won the Critics' Choice Movie Award for Best Young Performer. She then acted in Maude Apatow's comedy drama Poetic License (2025) and had her biggest box office success to date with the science fiction film The End of Oak Street (2026).

== Early and personal life ==
Maisy was born on December 13, 2003, in Oshawa, Ontario. Her parents are MaryLynne and Brad Stella, who are members of the country duo the Stellas, and she has an older sister, Lennon Stella. Stella is queer.

== Career ==
=== 2012–2018: Nashville and Lennon & Maisy ===
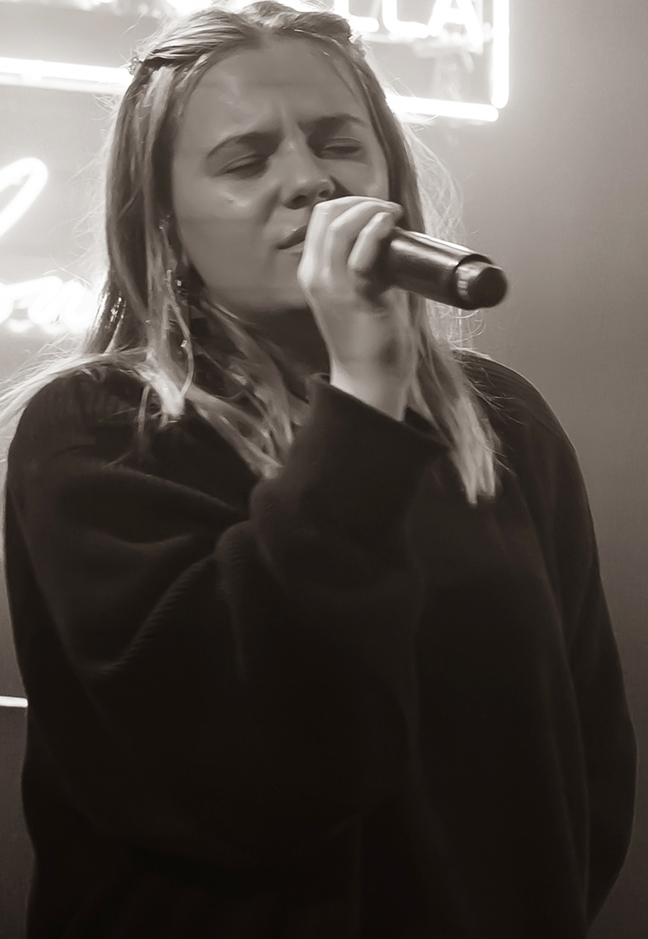
Stella performing in 2018

Stella had her breakthrough role starring as Daphne Conrad on the ABC/CMT musical drama television series Nashville (2012–2018), where she starred alongside her sister Lennon Stella. The series premiered on October 10, 2012 and aired its final episode on July 26, 2018.

During her time on Nashville, she also performed alongside her older sister Lennon Stella as the country music duo Lennon & Maisy, performing mostly covers of songs.

=== 2018–present: Solo work and return to acting ===
In 2016, Stella appeared on the YouTube web series We Are Savvy. The following year, Stella released her debut solo single, "Riding Free", for the soundtrack of the DreamWorks Animation series Spirit Riding Free. In 2017, Stella appeared as a guest judge in an episode of Top Chef Jr.

Stella returned to acting in 2024 with a lead role in Megan Park's coming-of-age comedy film My Old Ass, which premiered at the 2024 Sundance Film Festival to positive reviews from critics and proved to be a breakthrough for the actress. Co-starring Aubrey Plaza, Percy Hynes White, Maddie Ziegler and Maria Dizzia, the film followed Stella's character Elliot, a queer teenager who, upon turning 18, grapples with her sexuality and hopes for the future after being visited by her elder self (Plaza) during a psychedelic experience while on mushrooms. Christy Lemire of RogerEbert.com awarded the film 3½ out of 4 stars, praising the performances, direction, and cinematography, writing that Stella "has incredible screen presence and a great sense of comic timing, but she's equally convincing playing the more dramatic moments required of her character. It's an exciting feature film debut." Richard Lawson of Vanity Fair also praised Stella, saying she "makes Elliott a just-shy-of-annoying good-times gal, rude and rowdy but ultimately kind and decent. It's a charming, high-energy performance that is finely attuned to the emotional undulations of the film." Lawson noted the choice of setting—"the shores and islands of Lake Muskoka in Ontario, [make] My Old Ass a proudly, distinctly Canadian film. It's as alluring as a pleasant dream, sun dappled and teeming with possibility." He concluded, "What Park creates from the tension between this joyful, exciting present and a seemingly ominous future is rather marvelous, a big and sincere sentiment about the risk and reward of life, a message that is just as worthy for a middle-ager as it is for a kid." The film even received recognition from other filmmakers, including Chris Columbus, who named it one of his favorite films of 2024, saying "Over the past decade, I've witnessed a handful of young filmmakers with this kind of extraordinary promise. Megan, along with directors like Ryan Coogler and Robert Eggers, is a crucial component of our cinematic future. Yet she expertly acknowledges the inspiration of our celluloid past, proudly walking in the footsteps of Billy Wilder, Elaine May and John Hughes." Kelly Fremon Craig, William Goldenberg, Drew Hancock and Don Hertzfeldt also praised the film. For her critically acclaimed breakthrough performance, Stella earned numerous accolades including the Critics' Choice Movie Award for Best Young Performer and Independent Spirit Award for Best Breakthrough Performance, as well as a nomination for the Gotham Independent Film Award for Breakthrough Performer.

In the next year, she acted in Maude Apatow's directorial debut Poetic License, a comedy drama that premiered at the 2025 Toronto International Film Festival and received critical acclaim. In the film, which stars Leslie Mann as a former therapist who befriends two college seniors portrayed by Andrew Barth Feldman and Cooper Hoffman, Stella played the girlfriend of Feldman's character in a supporting role. Gregory Ellwood of The Playlist praised the film’s humor and natural performances, particularly the chemistry between the three leads, while also noting that the film was longer than necessary. It is scheduled for a theatrical release in 2027.

In 2026, Stella starred with Anne Hathaway in the science fiction survival film The End of Oak Street, which was a critical and box office success (Stella's first major commercial success), grossing over $122 million. That same year, she was cast as Chloe Price in the Amazon Prime Video television adaptation Life Is Strange, based on the 2015 video game.

== Stalking incident ==
In November 2018, Joshua Andrew Stephen Fox, age 41, was arrested by the Metro Nashville Police after having stalked Stella for over a year. According to police, the contact started when he reached out to the Stella family through its website, stating that he had relocated to Nashville from Miami to "be with the family".

On November 8, 2018, the FBI met with Fox at a Panera Bread café near Vanderbilt University after Fox allegedly sent Stella a "sexual invitation", ordering him to stop all contact with Stella and her family. After temporarily deactivating all his social media accounts, Fox reactivated them, and according to police, sent Stella 85 messages and videos, including ones of a sexual nature.

Within the next few days, Fox sent Stella a picture of a woman he had kidnapped and raped at gunpoint. The woman reported the incident the following day, and Fox was arrested in Asheville, North Carolina. He was then transferred to Smith County, Tennessee to face charges of rape and kidnapping. He was released from custody on an $80,000 bond.

== Filmography ==
=== Film ===
Year	Title	Role	Notes
2024	My Old Ass	Elliott Labrant	
2024	Standing on the Shoulders of Kitties	Herself	Cameo
2025	Poetic License	Grace Wilson	
2026	The Man I Love	Leslie	
2026	The End of Oak Street	Audrey Platt	
TBA	Ibelin †	Mia Steen	Post-production
TBA	Tumor †	Evelyn	Post-production

=== Television ===
Year	Title	Role	Notes
2012–2018	Nashville	Daphne Conrad	Recurring role (season 1); main role (Season 2–6)
2016	We Are Savvy	Herself	Web series
2017	Top Chef Jr	Herself	Guest judge
2017–2018	Spirit Riding Free	Voices	3 episodes (2 uncredited)
TBA	Life Is Strange †	Chloe Price	Main role

== Awards and nominations ==
Organizations	Year (Note: Indicates the year of the ceremony.)	Category	Work	Result	Ref.
Gotham Awards	2024	Breakthrough Performer	My Old Ass	Nominated	
Michigan Movie Critics Guild	2024	Breakthrough Award	My Old Ass	Nominated	
Las Vegas Film Critics Society	2024	Best Youth Performance – Female (under 21)	My Old Ass	Won	
Indiana Film Journalists Association	2024	Breakout of the Year	My Old Ass	Nominated	
Alliance of Women Film Journalists	2025	Best Breakthrough Performance	My Old Ass	Nominated	
Music City Film Critics Association	2025	Best Young Actress	My Old Ass	Nominated	
Critics' Choice Movie Awards	2025	Best Young Actor or Actress	My Old Ass	Won	
London Film Critics' Circle	2025	Breakthrough Performer	My Old Ass	Nominated	
Independent Spirit Awards	2025	Best Breakthrough Performance	My Old Ass	Won	
