= Michael Lawrence Goldberg =

American Film & TV producer

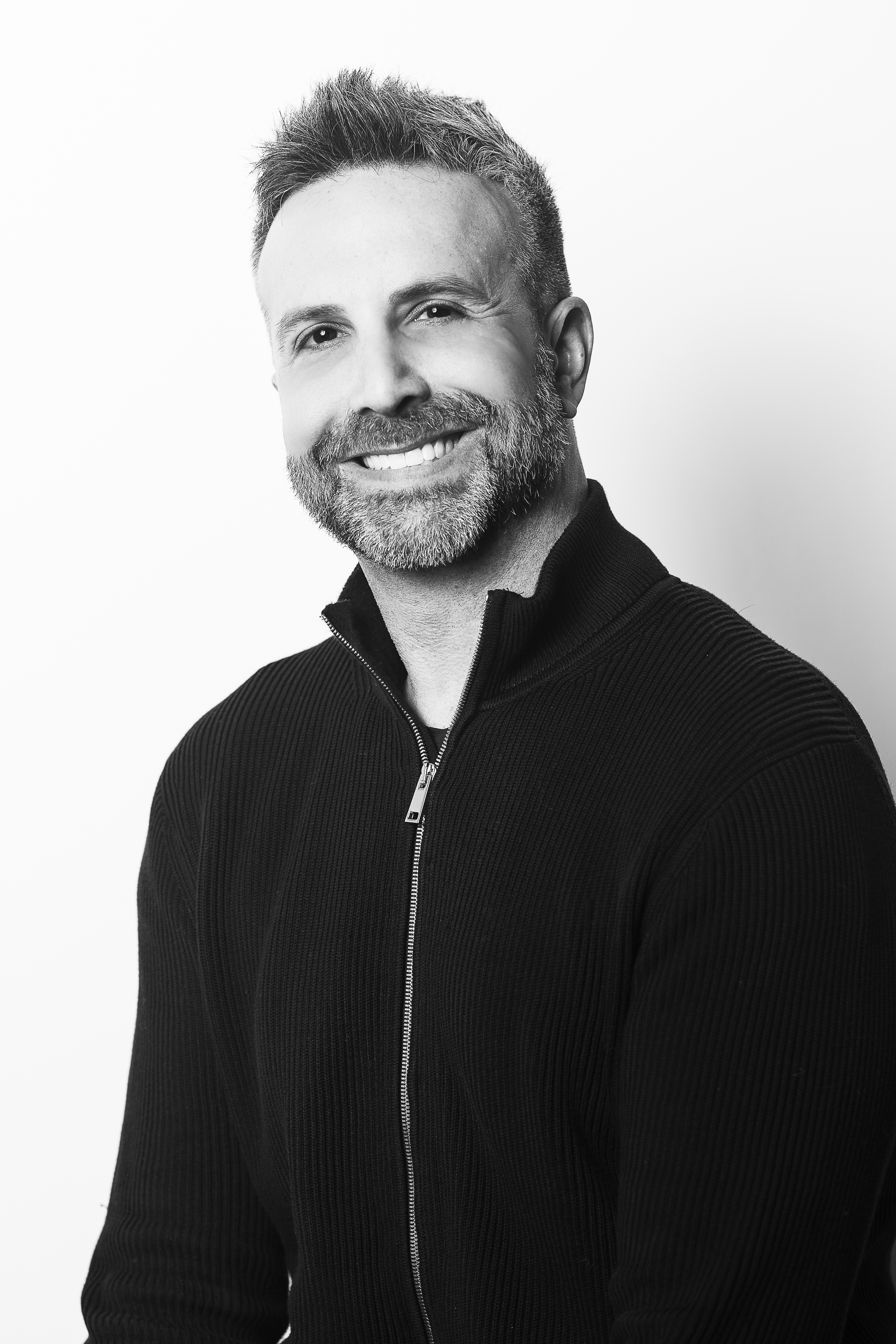
- Born: January 27, 1981 (age 45); Miami, Florida, U.S.
- Other name: Mike Goldberg
- Education: University of Florida; Miami Killian Senior High School
- Occupations: Film production; Television production
- Employer: Story Kitchen
- Organization: BAFTA
- Agent: WME
- Children: 2
- Website: story-kitchen.com

Michael Lawrence Goldberg is an American film producer. He is a co-founder of Story Kitchen (formerly dj2 Entertainment), alongside Dmitri M. Johnson.

== History ==
Michael Lawrence Goldberg (born in Miami, Florida), graduated from University of Florida in 2003, and is married with twin sons, currently residing in Los Angeles, California.

In the 2000s, Goldberg began his entertainment career as a Development Assistant for Silver Pictures, pivoting to literary management by launching Abstract Entertainment in 2008. In 2010, Goldberg dissolved Abstract Entertainment to co-run ROAR'S film literary management department, exiting for a similar role with New Wave Entertainment. In 2013, Goldberg pivoted to becoming a film and television literary agent for APA (now called IAG), promoted to agency partner in 2020 as well as featured in Variety's 'Hollywood's New Leaders'.

=== Story Kitchen ===
In 2022, Goldberg co-launched Story Kitchen, an American independent production company focused on adapting videogames, and other 'non-traditional' IPs, into film and television. Story Kitchen currently has a television first-look deal with Amazon MGM Studios as well as an animated film first-look deal with DreamWorks Animation.

In 2025, Story Kitchen renewed their first-look television deal with Amazon MGM Studios (until 2028).

In May 2025, Variety's Luminate Film & TV report published "The State of the Video Game & Toy IP Landscape", naming Story Kitchen 3rd in Hollywood (with 11 active adaptations at time of publishing), seated behind Mattel, and LEGO, for the most "Notable Transmedia Prodcos, by Game/Toy".

== Filmography ==
=== Television ===
==== As executive producer ====
- Tomb Raider: The Legend of Lara Croft (2024–25)
- Life Is Strange (TBA)
- Tomb Raider (TBA)

== Panels ==
- Games for Change: "Games, Hollywood, and Impact"
- Screen Play / London Games
- SXSW: "Transmedia is Back – But What Comes Next?"
- XDS External Development Summit: "BAFTA Presents "Franchise Farming" with Story Kitchen — When, How, and with Whom to Grow a Game IP into Film/TV, Animation, and Beyond"
