= Ane Brun discography =

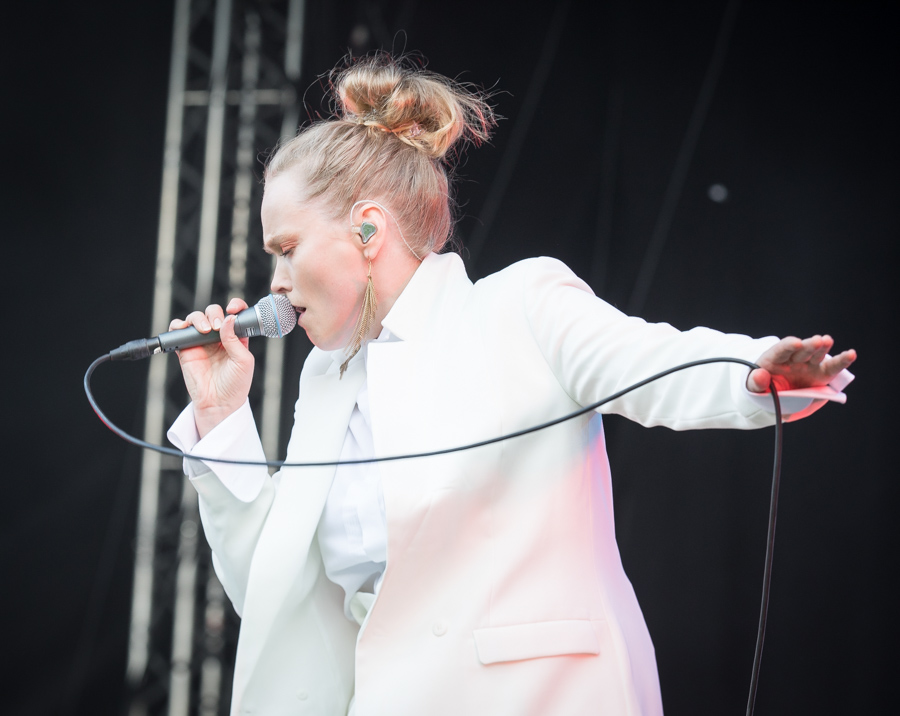
- Brun performing in 2017
- Studio albums: 11
- EPs: 7
- Live albums: 6
- Compilation albums: 5
- Video albums: 1

The discography of Norwegian singer-songwriter Ane Brun consists of 11 studio albums, 6 live albums, 6 compilations, 7 EPs, 64 singles as the main artist, and 16 as the featured artist.

== Albums ==
=== Studio albums ===
| Year | Album | Peak positions | | | | | | Certifications |
| Year | Album | NOR | BEL (Fl) | DEN | FR | NED | SWE | Certifications |
|---|---|---|---|---|---|---|---|---|
| 2003 | Spending Time with Morgan | 19 | – | – | – | – | – | |
| 2005 | A Temporary Dive | 1 | – | – | – | – | 12 | IFPI NOR: Platinum |
| 2005 | Duets | 2 | – | – | – | – | 40 | |
| 2008 | Changing of the Seasons | 1 | – | – | – | 48 | 2 | IFPI NOR: Gold |
| 2008 | Sketches | 15 | – | – | – | – | – | |
| 2011 | It All Starts with One | 1 | 67 | 36 | 159 | 13 | 1 | IFPI NOR: 2× Platinum; GLF: Gold |
| 2015 | When I'm Free | 4 | 72 | – | – | 12 | 3 | |
| 2017 | Leave Me Breathless | 3 | 75 | – | – | 76 | 5 | IFPI NOR: Gold |
| 2020 | After the Great Storm | 15 | – | – | – | – | 13 | |
| 2020 | How Beauty Holds the Hand of Sorrow | 17 | – | – | – | – | 30 | |
| 2026 | I Thought We Were the Same | 72 | – | – | – | – | 31 | |

=== Live albums ===
| Year | Album | Peak positions | |
| Year | Album | NOR | SWE |
|---|---|---|---|
| 2007 | Live in Scandinavia | 11 | 12 |
| 2009 | Live at Stockholm Concert Hall | 7 | 5 |
| 2014 | Songs Tour 2013 | – | – |
| 2018 | Live at Berwaldhallen (with the Swedish RSO and Hans Ek) | – | 54 |
| 2018 | Leave Me Breathless (Live) | – | – |
| 2024 | 20th Anniversary Tour | – | – |

=== Compilations ===
| Year | Album | Peak positions | | Certifications |
| Year | Album | NOR | SWE | Certifications |
|---|---|---|---|---|
| 2013 | Songs 2003–2013 | 2 | 6 | |
| 2013 | Rarities | 21 | – | IFPI NOR: Gold |
| 2022 | Nærmere | – | – | |
| 2023 | Songs 2013–2023 | – | – | |
| 2023 | Rarities 2 | – | – | |
| 2023 | Portrayals | – | – | |

== EPs ==
- 2001: What I Want
- 2001: Wooden Body
- 2002: Live at Zarathustra
- 2004: My Lover Will Go
- 2006: Connecting You to Me
- 2012: Do You Remember
- 2021: The RMV Sessions

== Singles ==
=== As main artist ===
| Year | Single | Peak positions | | | Certifications | Album |
| Year | Single | DEN | NOR | SWE | Certifications | Album |
|---|---|---|---|---|---|---|
| 2002 | "Sleeping by the Fyris River" | – | – | – | | Spending Time with Morgan |
| 2003 | "Are They Saying Goodbye?" | – | – | – | | Spending Time with Morgan |
| 2003 | "Humming One of Your Songs" | – | – | – | | Spending Time with Morgan |
| 2004 | "I Shot My Heart" | – | – | – | | Spending Time with Morgan |
| 2004 | "Song No. 6" feat. Ron Sexsmith | – | – | – | | A Temporary Dive |
| 2005 | "My Lover Will Go" | – | – | 39 | | A Temporary Dive |
| 2005 | "Lift Me" feat. Madrugada | – | 1 | 44 | | Duets |
| 2006 | "Rubber & Soul" feat. Teitur | – | – | – | | A Temporary Dive |
| 2006 | "Balloon Ranger" | – | – | – | | A Temporary Dive |
| 2007 | "The Dancer" | – | – | – | | Non-album single |
| 2008 | "Big in Japan" | – | – | 3 | GLF: Gold | Changing of the Seasons |
| 2008 | "True Colors" | – | – | 5 | GLF: Platinum | Changing of the Seasons |
| 2008 | "The Treehouse Song" | – | – | – | | Changing of the Seasons |
| 2008 | "The Puzzle" | – | – | – | | Changing of the Seasons |
| 2008 | "Headphone Silence" (Henrik Schwarz/DF Remix) | – | – | – | | Spending Time with Morgan |
| 2011 | "Do You Remember" | – | – | – | | It All Starts with One |
| 2011 | "One" | – | – | – | | It All Starts with One |
| 2012 | "Worship" feat. José González | – | – | – | | It All Starts with One |
| 2012 | "Virvelvind" | – | – | – | | Non-album single |
| 2012 | "Fly on the Windscreen" feat. Vince Clarke | – | – | – | | Rarities |
| 2013 | "Oh Love" | 23 | – | – | | It All Starts with One |
| 2013 | "This Voice" | – | – | – | | Non-album singles |
| 2013 | "She Belongs to Me" | – | – | – | | Non-album singles |
| 2014 | "To Let Myself Go" | – | – | – | | Non-album singles |
| 2014 | "One Last Try" | – | – | – | | Do You Remember |
| 2015 | "Directions" | – | – | – | | When I'm Free |
| 2015 | "Shape of a Heart" | – | – | – | | When I'm Free |
| 2016 | "You Lit My Fire" | – | – | – | | When I'm Free |
| 2016 | "When My Love Swears That He Is Made of Truth" | – | – | – | | Non-album single |
| 2016 | "Make You Feel My Love" | – | – | – | | Leave Me Breathless |
| 2017 | "Hero" | – | – | – | | Leave Me Breathless |
| 2017 | "Into My Arms" | – | – | – | | Leave Me Breathless |
| 2018 | "Horizons" with Dustin O'Halloran | – | – | – | | Puzzle (Original Motion Picture Soundtrack) |
| 2018 | "Springa" | – | – | – | | Becoming Astrid (Original Motion Picture Soundtrack) |
| 2018 | "Vanlig Vardag" | – | – | – | | Hocus Pocus Alfie Atkins (Original Motion Picture Soundtrack) |
| 2019 | "Into a Dream" | – | – | – | | Non-album singles |
| 2019 | "You'll Never Walk Alone" | – | – | – | | Non-album singles |
| 2019 | "Mellom bakkar og berg" | – | – | – | | Non-album singles |
| 2019 | "At Last" | – | – | – | | Non-album singles |
| 2019 | "Silent Night Before the First Day of Christmas" | – | – | – | | Non-album singles |
| 2019 | "All Is Soft Inside (From NRK HAIK for AURORA, 2019)" | – | – | – | | Non-album singles |
| 2020 | "Don't Run and Hide" | – | – | – | | After the Great Storm |
| 2020 | "Feeling Like I Wanna Cry" | – | – | – | | After the Great Storm |
| 2020 | "Honey" | – | – | – | | After the Great Storm |
| 2020 | "Take Hold of Me" | – | – | – | | After the Great Storm |
| 2020 | "We Need a Mother" | – | – | – | | After the Great Storm |
| 2020 | "Crumbs" | – | – | – | | After the Great Storm |
| 2020 | "Trust" | – | – | – | | How Beauty Holds the Hand of Sorrow |
| 2020 | "Song for Thrill and Tom" | – | – | – | | How Beauty Holds the Hand of Sorrow |
| 2020 | "Lose My Way" with Dustin O'Halloran | – | – | – | | How Beauty Holds the Hand of Sorrow |
| 2020 | "Closer" | – | – | – | | How Beauty Holds the Hand of Sorrow |
| 2021 | "Visa Vid Midsommartid" | – | – | – | | Non-album single |
| 2021 | "Lille Venn" | – | – | – | | Nærmere |
| 2021 | "Ta Tak i Me" | – | – | – | | Nærmere |
| 2021 | "Lo, How a Rose E'er Blooming" | – | – | – | | Non-album single |
| 2021 | "Nærmere" | – | – | – | | Nærmere |
| 2021 | "Understrøm" | – | – | – | | Nærmere |
| 2022 | "Våge Å Elske" | – | – | – | | Nærmere |
| 2022 | "Fingeravtrykk" | – | – | – | | Nærmere |
| 2022 | "Stormens Øye" | – | – | – | | Nærmere |
| 2022 | "Vi Møttes I En Soloppgang" | – | – | – | | Nærmere |
| 2023 | "Hand in the Fire" | – | – | – | | 20th Anniversary Tour |
| 2023 | "Månens elev" | – | – | – | | Non-album single |
| 2024 | "Balloon Ranger Anthem" | – | – | – | | 20th Anniversary Tour |

=== As featured artist ===
| Year | Single | Peak positions | | | Certifications | Album |
| Year | Single | NOR | SWE | UK | Certifications | Album |
|---|---|---|---|---|---|---|
| 2005 | "This Road" (Lars Bygdén feat. Ane Brun) | – | – | – | | This Road |
| 2009 | "Koop Island Blues" (Koop feat. Ane Brun) | – | – | – | | Koop Islands |
| 2013 | "Lose Sight" (Andrew Bayer feat. Ane Brun) | – | – | – | | If It Were You, We'd Never Leave |
| 2015 | "Can't Stop Playing (Makes Me High)" (Dr. Kucho! & Gregor Salto feat. Ane Brun) | – | – | 4 | BPI: Platinum | Non-album single |
| 2015 | "To Let Myself Go" (The Avener feat. Ane Brun) | – | – | – | | The Wanderings of the Avener |
| 2018 | "Your Eyes" (Andrew Bayer feat. Ane Brun) | – | – | – | | In My Last Life |
| 2018 | "Love You More" (Andrew Bayer feat. Ane Brun) | – | – | – | | In My Last Life |
| 2018 | "A Snowflake Fell (and It Felt Like a Kiss)" (Weeping Willows feat. Ane Brun) | – | – | – | | Snowflakes |
| 2019 | "Hold on to You" (Andrew Bayer feat. Ane Brun) | – | – | – | | In My Last Life |
| 2020 | "When I Let Go (Live in Oslo)" (Fay Wildhagen feat. Ane Brun) | – | – | – | | Leave Me to the Moon |
| 2020 | "Nesten Hjemme" (Turab and Ane Brun) | – | – | – | | Non-album singles |
| 2020 | "Directions" (Ralph Myerz feat. Ane Brun) | – | – | – | | Non-album singles |
| 2021 | "Shapes of Dreams"(April Snow feat. Ane Brun) | – | – | – | | Non-album singles |
| 2022 | "Så blåögd är jag"(Moa Lignell and Ane Brun) | – | – | – | | Non-album singles |
| 2022 | "Sun, Moon, Stars"(Siv Jakobsen feat. Ane Brun) | – | – | – | | Gardening |
| 2024 | "My Name" (AURORA feat. Ane Brun) | – | – | – | | What Happened to the Heart? |

=== Also appears on ===
- "Don't Give Up" New Blood (Peter Gabriel, 2011)
- "Don't Give Up" Live Blood (Peter Gabriel, 2012)

== Other certified songs ==
| Year | Title | Certifications | Album |
|---|---|---|---|
| 2013 | "Halo" feat. Linnea Olsson | IFPI NOR: Gold; GLF: Gold | Rarities |

== Videography ==
=== DVDs ===
- 2009: Live at Stockholm Concert Hall (also released as an album in Sweden)
