= Jonathan Morali =

French musician (b. 1980)

- Born: 22 May 1980 (age 46); Paris, France
- Genres: Video game music, Indie, Folk, Pop, Rock
- Years active: 2002–present
- Website: jonathanmorali.com

Jonathan Morali (born 22 May 1980) is a French composer, songwriter, singer, founder and frontman of the band Syd Matters. He gained notoriety for his involvement on the soundtracks for Life is Strange video game series.

== Early life ==
=== Debut and Syd Matters ===
Jonathan Morali was born in Paris on 22 May 1980. He began his performing career playing at small bars until he was noticed by Third Side Records and signed to a recording contract. His first album, A Whisper and a Sigh, which was recorded during the summer of 2002 and released 28 June 2004. Developing an atmospheric folk-pop style that featured acoustic settings combined with electronica-influenced touches that sounded a bit like a hybrid between Nick Drake and Radiohead.

Since Syd Matters’ debut, their experimental genre has been continuously reviewed by critics. Their second album, "Someday We Will Foresee Obstacles", brought the band mainstream attention with a review in the 32nd issue of Music Week. The unique sound they produce has been said to draw inspiration from genres such as prog rock, dub music, and Traditional pop, while also resembling that of singer-songwriter artists but at its core is often considered a mix between folk and electronic genres. In their reviews, they have also been compared to other artists such as Fleet Foxes, Fionn Regan, Grandaddy, The Flaming Lips, and Nick Drake.

=== Songs featured in media ===
His songs "To All of You" ("American Girls") and "Hello Sunshine", a Super Furry Animals cover, were featured in the television series The O.C. in season 3's The Party Favor and season 4's The Metamorphosis, respectively. Additionally, "Obstacles" and "To All of You" were featured in Dontnod Entertainment's 2015 video game Life Is Strange.

Featured Syd Matters songs :

- Newport Beach (The O.C.) (série télévisée), saison 3, épisode Le Barbecue coréen (The Party Favor) de Michael Lange (2006)
- Ma première fois by Marie-Castille Mention-Schaar (2012)
- Upside Down by Juan Solanas – songs River Sister and Obstacles (2012)
- Clara Sheller (TV series)
- Video game Life Is Strange – songs Obstacles and To All of You

=== Film score ===
In addition to his career with Syd Matters, Morali is a film composer. His most notable works are the soundtracks for Möbius, Les Adoptés (The Adopted), and La Question humaine, the latter of which was composed under the name Syd Matters. Morali also collaborated with director Rémi Chayé to create the score for the animated film Long Way North (2015), where he included two tracks by Syd Matters in the soundtrack.

=== Video games and Life Is Strange ===
Morali is also well-known for the creation of Life Is Strange and Life Is Strange 2 original scores. A gamer himself, he had been contacted by directors Raoul Barbet and Michel Koch to work on the first season of Life Is Strange at the very beginning of the development of the game. Director Raoul Barbet wanted to have some songs from his band in the game, and Morali agreed to compose the whole soundtrack in addition to allowing the use of "To All of You" and "Obstacles".

The soundtrack of Life Is Strange has won numerous awards including: Best Soundtrack at the 2015 PlayStation Universe awards, best soundtrack at the Game Informer Best of 2015 awards and best soundtrack at the Titanium Awards.

Morali also composed the Life Is Strange 2 original score.

=== Other projects ===
Jonathan has also composed music for plays, radio plays, opera and museums:

- 2016: Original creation around Dante's Inferno for France Culture radio, with Syd matters members. It will be played at Avignon festival.
- 2019–2020 : Soundtrack creation of Pas de deux play by Julien Favart.
- 2019–2020 : Original creation for Abu Dhabi's Louvre museum.
- 2020: Original creation around Franz Kafka's "La 'Métamorphose'", still with Syd matters, for France Culture radio.

== Video games ==
- Life Is Strange (2015)
- Life Is Strange 2 (2018)

== Film ==
=== As Jonathan Morali ===
- Avant qu'il ne soit trop tard by Laurent Dussaux (2004)
- Les Adoptés by Mélanie Laurent (2010)
- Mauvaise Fille by Patrick Mille (2012)
- Möbius by Éric Rochant (2013)
- Tout en haut du monde by Rémi Chayé (2015)
- L'Échappée belle by Émilie Cherpitel (2015)
- Le Nouveau by Rudi Rosenberg (2015)
- Druga strana svega (documentary film) by Mila Turajlić (2017)
- Au fil du monde by Jill Coulon and Isabelle Dupuy-Chavanat (Arte TV documentary series) (2017)
- A Real Job by Thomas Lilti (2023)

=== As Syd Matters ===
- Goodbye Mélodie (short) by David Barrouk (2005)
- La Question Humaine by Nicolas Klotz (2007)
- Les Grandes Grandes Vacances Animated series (2015)

== Albums (Syd Matters) ==
=== Studio albums ===
- A Whisper and A Sigh (2003)
- Someday We Will Foresee Obstacles (2005)
- Ghost Days (2008)
- Brotherocean (2010)
- A Gospel of Some Sort (2026)

=== Singles/EPs ===
- End & Start Again (2002)
- Fever In Winter, Shiver In June (2002)
- Everything Else (2007)
- Hi Life (2010)

=== Compilations ===
- Syd Matters (2006)

== Awards ==
Year	Nominee / work	Award	Result
2002	Syd Matters – A Whisper and a Sigh	CQFD Inrocks Mag	Won
2008	La Question humaine	Victoires de la musique, "Album de musique originale de cinéma ou de télévision"	Nominated
2015	Life Is Strange (video game)	Fun and Serious Game Festival – ES Titanium Awards – Best Soundtrack	Won
2015	Life Is Strange	US DarkCast: Games of the Year 2015 Archived 18 January 2018 at the Wayback Machine – Best Music	Won
2015	Life Is Strange	Quebec PlayStation Universe 2015 Awards – Best Musical Soundtrack	Won
2015	Life Is Strange	US Game Informer – Best Of 2015 Awards – Best Soundtrack	Won
2015	Life Is Strange	Golden Joystick Awards – Best Audio	Nominated
2015	Life Is Strange	Paste Magazine – Best Videogame Soundtracks	Nominated
2015	Life Is Strange	Hardcore Gamer – Best of 2015 – Best Licensed Soundtrack	Nominated
2015	Life Is Strange	Game Revolution – Best of 2015 Awards – Best Soundtrack	Nominated
2015	Life Is Strange	Playstation Blog – Game of the Year – Best Soundtrack	Nominated
2015	Life Is Strange	National Academy of Video Game Trade Reviewers – Original Light Mix Score, New IP	Won
2015	Life Is Strange	National Academy of Video Game Trade Reviewers – To All Of You – Song, Original or Adapted	Won
2015	Life Is Strange	National Academy of Video Game Trade Reviewers – Song Collection	Nominated
2015	Life Is Strange	Ping Awards – Meilleure Bande-son	Nominated
2016	Life Is Strange	Polygon – Emotional Game Awards – Best Emotional Music	Nominated
2017	Tout en haut du monde	European Animation Awards – Best Soundtrack in a Feature Film Production	Nominated
2018	Life Is Strange 2	Ping Awards – Meilleure Bande-son	Nominated
2019	Life Is Strange 2	Académie des Arts et Techniques du Jeu Vidéo – Pégases – Meilleure Univers Sonore	Nominated
