= House of History Baden-Württemberg =

Coordinates: 48°46′44″N 9°11′09″E

- Haus der Geschichte Baden-Württemberg
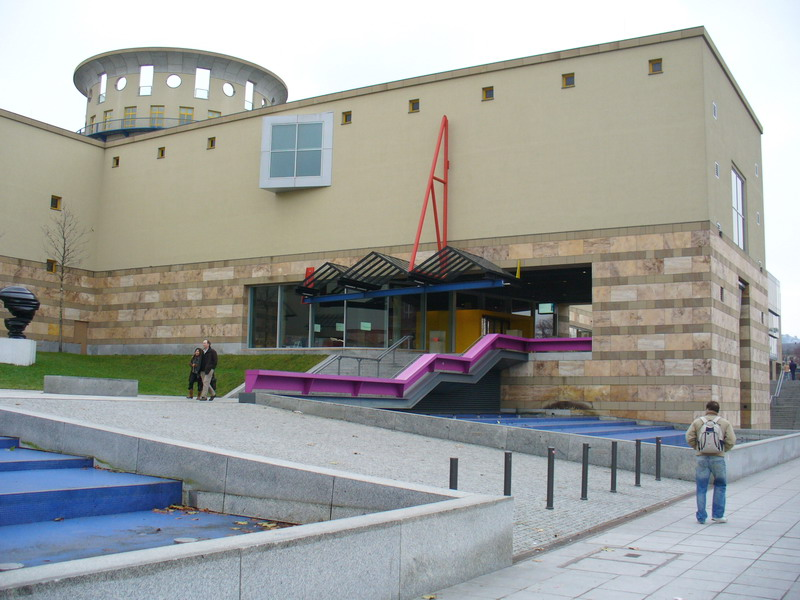
- Entrance of House of History
- Established: 1987, opened in 2002
- Location: Stuttgart, Germany
- Type: Museum of regional history
- Executive director: Cornelia Hecht-Zeiler
- Owner: State of Baden-Württemberg
- Website: https://www.hdgbw.de/history-museum-stuttgart/

The House of History Baden-Württemberg is a museum funded by the state of Baden-Württemberg in Stuttgart. It is located along the "Stuttgart Cultural Mile" on Konrad-Adenauer-Straße between the Staatsgalerie and the Musikhochschule.

The House of History Baden-Württemberg was founded on 1 October 1987. Beginning in 1992 a working group of state employees organized exhibitions about the state's history, which were displayed in decentralised locations. At the same time a project group which included the state historian Otto Borst, long-time museum director Thomas Schnabel, and exhibitions director Paula Lutrum-Lenger began to develop the museum's permanent exhibition. The building for the museum was an idea initiated by Erwin Teufel during his term as minister president and is one of the projects carried out by the Stirling-Wilford architectural group in Stuttgart. Final planning for the building was completed in 2002 by the architects Michael Wilford und Manuel Schupp. On 13 December 2002 the House of History Baden-Württemberg opened its permanent exhibition in the space of 2,000 m^{2} (22,000 sq ft) in its new quarters.

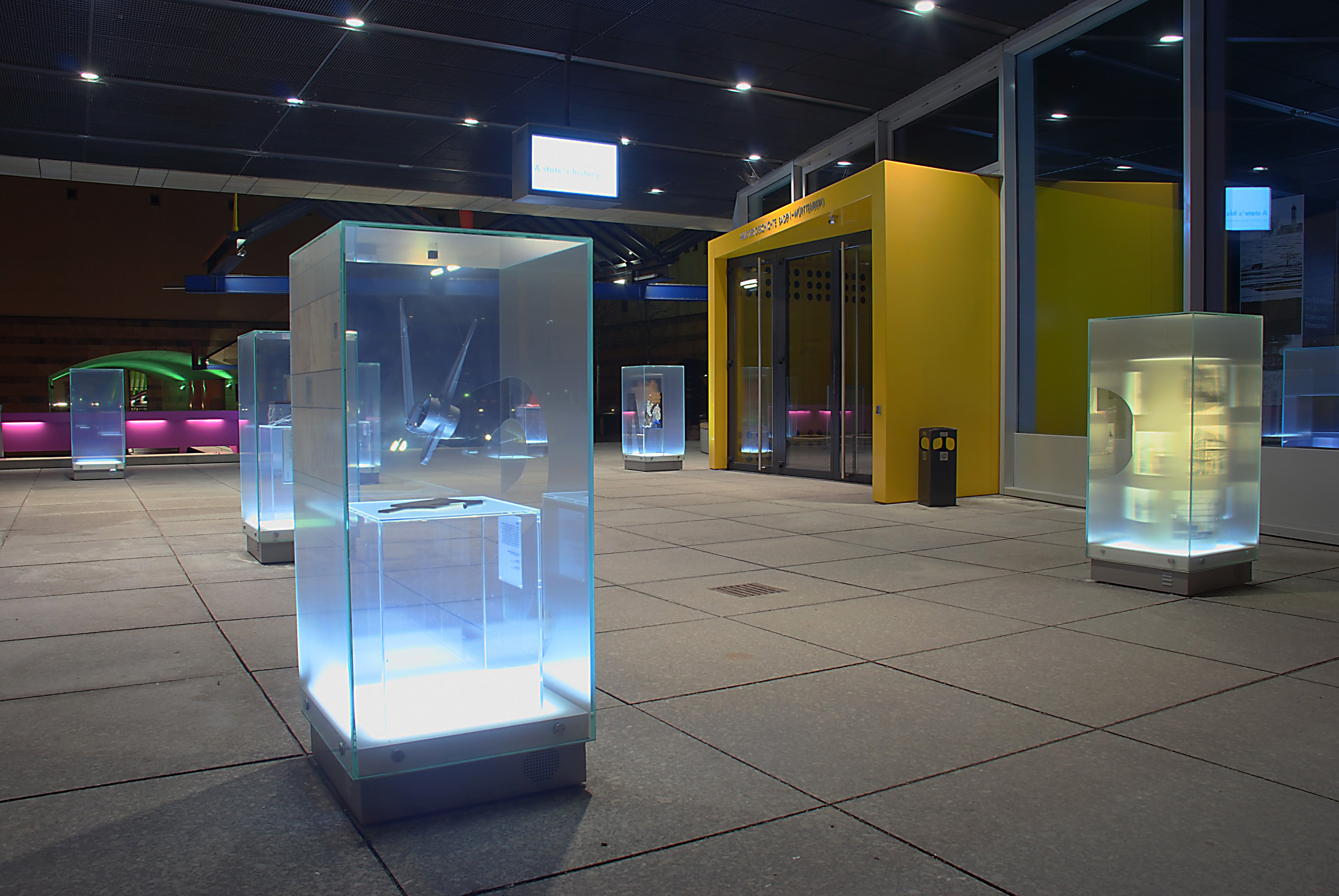
Showcases in the entry area (2011)

== Administration ==
The House of History has had three directors since 1989. Since 2024 the museum director is Cornelia Hecht-Zeiler. The museum's scientific advisory council consists of 13 members from different backgrounds.

== Exhibitions ==
The permanent exhibition is organised into three sections. In the entry area 26 objects are on display which are considered typical of Baden-Württemberg, with one object for each letter of the alphabet. In the second section, visitors transverse 200 years of the state's history in chronological order. On display are objects which tell the stories of the formerly separate states of Baden and Württemberg.

In these rooms there are no explanatory texts which would give visitors an interpretation of history or put events into a certain context. The chronological path begins with the Reichsdeputationshauptschluss of 1803, which paved the way for the secularization of ecclesiastical states and the abolishing of imperial cities, and continues to the present era, with a display of objects which are considered relevant for life today.

The displays highlight the following periods of history:

- 1790–1815: Territorial revolution
- 1815–1848: Vormärz
- 1848–1866: The revolution and its aftermath
- 1866–1914: Integration into the German nation state
- 1914–1945: Two world wars and the interwar years
- 1945–1972: Developments leading to the mergers of the separate states
- 1972–2002: Parliamentary democracy in the age of media
- A multimedia display aimed at evoking a response to the question as to what present-day Baden-Württemberg means to the individual visitor.

In the third part of the exhibition, a theme park presents current topics in an historical context: nature and the environment in connection with, for example, the Black Forest, economy, urbanization, religion, migration, family, marriage and relationships, science and research, and also the relationship to the neighboring country of France.

The permanent exhibition was conceptualized and developed by the international project team Atelier Brückner, headed by the architect Uwe R. Brückner.

=== How history is presented ===
The House of History offers an educational programme aimed primary at school classes and young people as well as individuals seeking to learn the German language and culture. Guided tours for various epochs and themes as well as workshops strive to develop historical literacy.

== Collections of regional history ==
The House of History maintains extensive holdings of historical items, including a large photo archive which includes the following special collections:

- Archive of the Tübingen publishing company Gebrüder Metz, which includes approx 270,000 glassplate-negatives.
- Bequest of Robert Holder (1908–1987), photographer and publisher in Bad Urach
- Bequest of Leif Geiges (1915–1990), photographer and reporter in Freiburg im Breisgau
- Bequest of Hannes Kilian (1909–1999), photographer in Stuttgart
- Bequest of Rupert Leser (1933–2017), photographer in Bad Waldsee

These collections are being successively inventoried and digitalized.

== External locations ==
The state museum is also responsible for the following branch locations:

- the Turenne Museum in Sasbach (established 2001)
- Stuttgart's memorial site dedicated to Claus von Stauffenberg (established 2006)
- the museum of the fortress prison Hohenasperg in Asperg (established 2010)

== Cooperative projects ==
The House of History is responsible for the maintenance of the permanent exhibition dealing with police persecution during the years of the Weimar Republic, in Nazi Germany and the post-war years in a former Stuttgart hotel that became the local headquarters for police and the Gestapo and an infamous jail where dissidents and persecuted minorities were held. The House of History cooperates with other educational and cultural institutions on the current projects undertaken here.

== Permanent exhibitions on external sites ==
- Memorial site dedicated to Matthias Erzberger in Münsingen (established 2004)
- The exhibit "Tracing Jewish Life in Hohenzollern" at the former synagoge of Haigerloch (established 2004)
- "With, Alongside, and Against One Another", an exhibition for the Museum of the History of Christians and Jews in Laupheim (established 2006)
- Exhibition "House at the Jewish Cemetery" at the Museum of the History of Christians and Jews in Laupheim (established 2014)
- "Forced Labour at the Kurz Barrel Factory. The Reich Labour Service (RAD) barracks" at theHohenloher Freilandmuseum in Wackershofen (established 2016)
- An exhibit about the German-American film producer Carl Laemmle at the Museum of the History of Christians and Jews in Laupheim (established 2018)
- An exhibit about Egon Eiermann, a leading architect of the 20th century, at the Eiermann-Magnani Dokumentationsstätte in Hettingen (established 2018)
- An exhibit about the judiciary during the years of National Socialism in Stuttgart for the Court of Appeals (Oberlandesgericht) at the District Court (Landgericht) in Stuttgart (established 2019)

== Bibliography ==
- Zu schön, um wahr zu sein = Too Good to be True : Photographien aus der Sammlung Metz. Ed. by Albrecht Krause. Trans. by Ann Potter Schadt. Arnold, Stuttgart, 1997 ISBN 978-3-925369-71-1
- Landesgeschichten. Der deutsche Südwesten von 1790 bis heute. Das Buch zur Dauerausstellung im Haus der Geschichte Baden-Württemberg. Stuttgart 2002, ISBN 3-933726-16-6
- Love thy neighbour : a history of relations in the "Dreiländereck." Haus der Geschichte Baden-Württemberg, Stuttgart, 2012
- Stauffenberg - the magazine about the exhibition. Haus der Geschichte Baden-Württemberg, Stuttgart, 2023 ISBN 978-3-933726-68-1
- Gestapo on trial : the prosecution of the Nazi crimes and criminals : magazine of the special exhibition by the Haus der Geschichte Baden-Württemberg at the "Hotel Silber" place of remembrance, 12/7/23 - 2/2/2025. Haus der Geschichte Baden-Württemberg. Stuttgart 2024, ISBN 978-3-933726-71-1
