= If It Were You, We'd Never Leave =

Studio album by Andrew Bayer
- Released: April 22, 2013
- Length: 60:08
- Label: Anjunabeats

Andrew Bayer chronology
It's Artificial (2011)	If It Were You, We'd Never Leave (2013)	Do Androids Dream (2015)

If It Were You, We'd Never Leave is the second studio album by American DJ Andrew Bayer, released on April 22, 2013 on Anjunabeats. Bayer described the album as a concept album, centered around the premise of being the soundtrack for a person's day, as opposed to his other work at that point, which was recorded more for play in dance clubs.

== Critical reception ==
Professional ratings
Review scores
Source	Rating
Mojo	4/5 stars
Q	3/5 stars

Stephen Worthy of Mojo said that the album "doesn't lack for ambition. If It Were You, We'd Never Leave bats back and forth from homespun laptop beats to full orchestral productions, glitch-hop to opulent Sigur Rósesque wall of sound." Worthy noted that "Gold Panda's folktronic transmissions are an obvious parallel" and concluded by calling the album "a warm-hearted record that splices modern romantic classicisms to cut'n'paste MacBook pyrotechnics". Joe Muggs of Q noted that "if it occasionally veers into high-class holiday programme soundtrack territory, it is just as often take-your-breath-away beautiful". Consequence of Sound's Derek Staples noted the change in sound for Bayer, describing it as "an album you repeatedly pull to ease personal hardship not spark dancefloor undulations", while still conceding that it was still built on some of the similar approach of his prior work, such as "utiliz[ing] simple tools to create complex, emotionally powerful movements." In the Mix stated "there’s a gob-smacking amount of sonic experimentation...though Bayer’s real achievement is how he’s managed to weave all this stuttering, jittery white sound into something that carries so much musicality."

== Track listing ==
No.	Title	Length
1.	"Opening Act"	3:34
2.	"Doomsday"	3:43
3.	"It's Going to Be Fine"	3:55
4.	"Let's Hear That B Section Again!"	4:24
5.	"Lose Sight" (featuring Ane Brun)	3:58
6.	"You Are" (featuring Deb Talan)	3:40
7.	"All This Will Happen Again"	4:21
8.	"Echo" (featuring Alison May)	3:05
9.	"A Brief Interlude"	3:00
10.	"Gaff's Eulogy"	5:09
11.	"Need Your Love"	3:56
12.	"Farnsworth Court"	4:04
13.	"Make No Sound" (featuring Alison May)	3:18
14.	"Counting Down"	3:09
15.	"Soul Cry"	3:32
16.	"Closing Act"	6:55
17.	"Dedicated to Boston's Waste Management System" (Keyworth Remix) (bonus track)	5:09
Total length:		60:08

== Charts ==
Chart (2013)	Peak position
US Top Dance Albums (Billboard)	19
US Heatseekers Albums (Billboard)	21
