= It All Starts with One =

2011 studio album by Ane Brun

Studio album by Ane Brun
- Released: 6 September 2011 (Scandinavia); 13 September 2011 (Benelux); 16 September 2011 (Germany, Austria & Switzerland); 27 September 2011 (France); 24 October 2011 (UK); 1 November 2011 (US)
- Genre: Folk
- Label: Balloon Ranger Recordings
- Producer: Tobias Fröberg

Ane Brun chronology
| Live at Stockholm Concert Hall (2009) | It All Starts with One (00000001) | When I'm Free (2015) |

Singles from It All Starts with One
- 1. "Do You Remember" Released: 23 May 2011

Professional ratings
Review scores
| Source | Rating |
|---|---|
| Allmusic | 3.5/5 stars |
| BBC | (very favourable) |
| The Independent | 4/5 stars |
| Mojo | 4/5 stars |
| musicOMH | 4/5 stars |
| PopMatters | 5/10 stars |

It All Starts with One is the sixth studio album by Norwegian singer-songwriter Ane Brun, released in the UK on 24 October 2011 and in the US on 1 November 2011. The album was released as a standard single CD with ten tracks, or as a two-disc "deluxe edition" on both CD and vinyl, which includes an additional eight tracks on the second CD and five tracks on the second vinyl disc. The track "Worship" features guest vocals from José González.

Although the album was initially intended to be completed and released in 2010, recording was delayed for a year when Brun was asked to be a backing singer on Peter Gabriel's New Blood tour, contributing to the re-recording of "Don't Give Up" on the accompanying album.

The album was first released in the Scandinavian countries on 6 September 2011. It debuted at No. 1 in both Brun's native Norway and in her adopted homeland of Sweden, making it the first album by a Norwegian artist to top the Swedish album charts. The album was subsequently released throughout Europe in September, before its release in the UK and US.

The music videos for "Words," "One," "Worship," and "Do You Remember" were taken from a short film titled ONE, directed by Brun's regular directorial partner, Magnus Renfors.

It All Starts with One was certified 2× platinum by the International Federation of the Phonographic Industry of Norway, for 40,000 sales.

== Track listings ==
From Balloon Ranger Recordings.

=== Standard edition ===
All tracks are written by Ane Brun.

| No. | Title | Length |
|---|---|---|
| 1. | "These Days" | 4:38 |
| 2. | "Words" | 4:24 |
| 3. | "Worship" (featuring José González) | 6:00 |
| 4. | "Do You Remember" | 3:12 |
| 5. | "What's Happening with You and Him" | 4:36 |
| 6. | "Lifeline" | 3:03 |
| 7. | "One" | 3:18 |
| 8. | "The Light from One" | 5:21 |
| 9. | "Oh Love" | 4:18 |
| 10. | "Undertow" | 6:31 |

=== CD deluxe edition (second disc) ===
| No. | Title | Writer(s) | Length |
|---|---|---|---|
| 1. | "Dirty Windshield" | | 3:34 |
| 2. | "Take It Slow" | | 3:03 |
| 3. | "One Last Try" | | 2:57 |
| 4. | "Queen and King" | | 4:12 |
| 5. | "Du Gråter Så Store Tåra" (English version) | | 3:19 |
| 6. | "I Would Hurt a Fly" | Doug Martsch | 5:49 |
| 7. | "Another World" | Antony Hegarty | 4:16 |
| 8. | "Alfonsina y el mar" | Ariel Ramírez, Félix Luna | 4:23 |

=== Vinyl deluxe edition (second disc) ===
| No. | Title | Length |
|---|---|---|
| 1. | "Dirty Windshield" | 3:34 |
| 2. | "Take It Slow" | 3:03 |
| 3. | "One Last Try" | 2:57 |
| 4. | "Du Gråter Så Store Tåra" (English version) | 3:19 |
| 5. | "I Would Hurt a Fly" | 5:49 |

== Certifications ==
| Region | Certification | Certified units/sales |
|---|---|---|
| Norway (IFPI Norway) | 2× Platinum | 40,000^{‡} |
| Sweden (GLF) | Gold | 15,000^{‡} |
^{‡} Sales+streaming figures based on certification alone.
