= Duets (Ane Brun album) =

Studio album by Ane Brun
- Released: 21 November 2005
- Length: 37:32

Ane Brun chronology
A Temporary Dive (2005)	Duets (2005)	Live in Scandinavia (2007)

Duets is the third studio album by Ane Brun, released 21 November 2005.

== Track listing ==
1. "Little Lights" (featuring Syd Matters) – 4:11
2. "Lift Me" (featuring Madrugada) – 4:04
3. "Rubber & Soul" (featuring Teitur) – 3:11
4. "This Road" (featuring Lars Bygdén) – 3:56
5. "Stop" (featuring Liv Widell) – 3:41
6. "Across the Bridge" (featuring Ellekari Larsson (The Tiny)) – 3:32
7. "Easier" (featuring Tingsek) – 3:36
8. "Love & Misery" (featuring Tobias Fröberg) – 3:39
9. "Such a Common Bird" (featuring Wendy McNeill) – 3:44
10. "Song No. 6" (featuring Ron Sexsmith) – 3:58
