= A Temporary Dive =

Studio album by Ane Brun
- Released: 7 February 2005; April 2006 (UK & US); 28 March 2007 (Japan)
- Recorded: Autumn 2004
- Studio: Bonsai Studios, Stockholm
- Genre: Pop
- Length: 38:01
- Label: DetErMine Records (Europe); V2 Records (US); Side Out Records (Japan)
- Producer: Katharina Nuttall and Ane Brun

Ane Brun chronology
Spending Time with Morgan (2003)	A Temporary Dive (2005)	Duets (2005)

2006 US and 2010 European reissue album cover

Singles from A Temporary Dive
- 1. "My Lover Will Go" Released: 2004; 2. "Song No. 6" Released: 2005; 3. "Balloon Ranger" Released: 2005

Professional ratings
Review scores
Source	Rating
Pitchfork	7.7/10
Slant Magazine	4.5/5 stars
Tiny Mix Tapes	3.5/5 stars

A Temporary Dive is the second studio album by the Norwegian singer-songwriter Ane Brun, initially released in Norway and Sweden on 7 February 2005. The album debuted at No. 1 in her native Norway.

The track "Song No. 6" features the Canadian singer-songwriter Ron Sexsmith and also appears on her Duets album. It was recorded at an after-show party following their performances at the Storsjöyran festival in Östersund, Sweden. The track "Balloon Ranger" was said by Ane to be analogous to her troubles learning the English language, or rather how she sometimes comes up with nonsense words that have no inherent meaning. She later used the song's title for the name of her record label.

Versions of the album were released in the UK and US in 2006, and in Japan in 2007, each with different track listings and different artwork. The original album was re-released on CD for the European market in spring 2010, featuring new artwork (the same as that used for the 2006 US release) and a bonus track, "Half Open Door".

== Track listing ==
All tracks are written by Ane Brun, except where noted

No.	Title	Writer(s)	Length
1.	"To Let Myself Go"		3:19
2.	"Rubber & Soul"		3:13
3.	"Balloon Ranger"		3:16
4.	"My Lover Will Go"		4:41
5.	"Temporary Dive"		4:25
6.	"Laid in Earth"	Henry Purcell	4:08
7.	"This Voice"		2:49
8.	"Where Friend Rhymes with End"		3:33
9.	"Song No. 6" (featuring Ron Sexsmith)		4:00
10.	"The Fight Song"		4:30

=== 2010 European reissue bonus track ===
No.	Title	Length
11.	"Half Open Door"	3:53

=== 2006 UK version ===
No.	Title	Length
1.	"To Let Myself Go"	3:19
2.	"Rubber & Soul"	3:13
3.	"Balloon Ranger"	3:16
4.	"My Lover Will Go"	4:41
5.	"Temporary Dive"	4:25
6.	"Humming One of Your Songs" (originally on Spending Time with Morgan)	4:55
7.	"Are They Saying Goodbye" (originally on Spending Time with Morgan)	3:58
8.	"On Off" (originally on Spending Time with Morgan)	4:34
9.	"This Voice"	2:49
10.	"Where Friend Rhymes with End"	3:33
11.	"Song No. 6" (featuring Ron Sexsmith)	4:00
12.	"The Fight Song"	4:30

=== 2006 US version ===
No.	Title	Writer(s)	Length
1.	"To Let Myself Go"		3:19
2.	"Song No. 6" (featuring Ron Sexsmith)		4:00
3.	"Balloon Ranger"		3:16
4.	"My Lover Will Go"		4:41
5.	"Temporary Dive"		4:25
6.	"Laid in Earth"	Henry Purcell	4:08
7.	"This Voice"		2:49
8.	"Where Friend Rhymes with End"		3:33
9.	"Rubber & Soul" (featuring Teitur)		3:13
10.	"The Fight Song"		4:30
11.	"Little Lights" (featuring Syd Matters)	Syd Matters	4:14

=== 2007 Japan version ===
No.	Title	Writer(s)	Length
1.	"To Let Myself Go"		3:19
2.	"Song No. 6" (featuring Ron Sexsmith)		4:00
3.	"Where Friend Rhymes with End"		3:33
4.	"Balloon Ranger"		3:16
5.	"My Lover Will Go"		4:41
6.	"Temporary Dive"		4:25
7.	"Laid in Earth"	Henry Purcell	4:08
8.	"This Voice"		2:49
9.	"Rubber & Soul" (featuring Teitur)		3:13
10.	"The Fight Song"		4:30
11.	"Half Open Door"		3:53
12.	"The Dancer"	PJ Harvey

== Charts ==
Chart (2005)	Peak position
Norwegian Albums (VG-lista)	1
Swedish Albums (Sverigetopplistan)	12
