= Massproduktion =

Swedish record label

Massproduktion is a Swedish record company from Sundsvall started 1979 when it released records with local punk bands like Massmedia, Vacuum and Förbjudna ljud. Other bands published by Massproduktion include Lars Bygdén, The Confusions, Garmarna, The Thousand Dollar Playboys and Left Hand Solution. Massmedia became a formal company in 1981 and a stock company in 2001. The punk band Massmedia started the label after seeing an ad for cheap pressings in Texas in NME.
