= The Confusions =

Swedish pop band

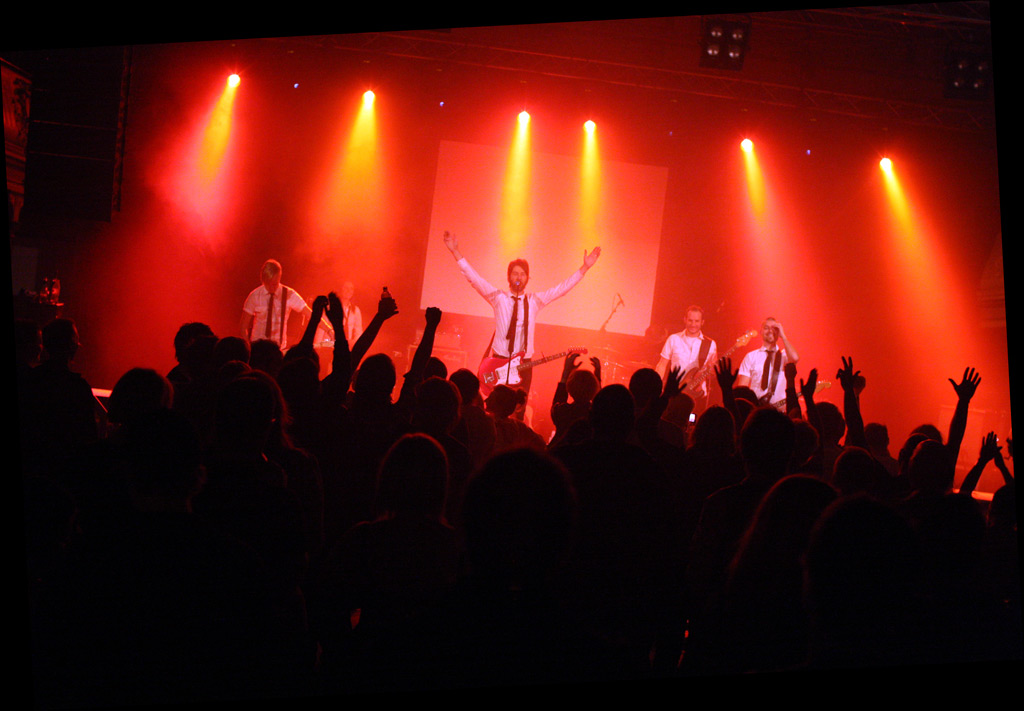

Background information
- Origin: Sundsvall, Sweden
- Genres: Indie pop, Indie rock, Post punk
- Label: Massproduktion
- Members: Mikael Andersson-Knut (vocalist, songwriter, guitarist); Zarah Andersson-Knut (keyboardist, backup vocalist); Mattias Lofstrom (percussionist); Magnus Thorsell (bassist)
- Website: http://www.theconfusions.com/

The Confusions is an indie pop band from Sundsvall, Sweden. The band was formed in the early 1990s. Their breakthrough album, Everyone's Invited, along with their following album Six-0-Seven, were produced by Peter Svensson of The Cardigans. In 1997, The Confusions and Massproduktion signed with Stockholm Records, but were quickly released after Stockholm Records was bought by Universal 10.

The Confusions was formed in 1991 by a gang of childhood friends in the suburb of Skönsberg in Sundsvall, an industrial town in the north known for its punk, post punk, and metal scene. Five years later, their second album Everyone’s Invited, smashed all the doors open to numerous releases and tours all over the world. It was crowned with the title of “one of this year’s five top album” by Record Collector.

Some years later a gig at SXSW would open the door for some touring of US and finally also a Nordic MTV no 1 for the video to The Pilot. The band survived the ups and downs of an indie band, still touring, developing and releasing records, building a bond between the members.

After a challenging period, the band built a studio in their rehearsal room and 2008 recorded the more than one hour long self-produced album “The Story Behind the Story” that by many was regarded as their finest work and also found a working method by recording and producing in their own studio.

In early 2020 the band played two hours show in hometown Sundsvall with tracks from all their 30 years and felt it was time to gather some of the latest releases and combine with the new stuff, the double vinyl album "Black Silhouettes."

The band won the SMA Award for Best Album for 5am at the Fourth Sundsvall Music Awards.

== Lineup ==
- Mikael Andersson-Knut: lead vocals, songwriter and guitar
- Zarah Andersson-Knut: keyboard and backup vocals
- Mattias Lofstrom: drums and percussion
- Magnus Thorsell: bass

== Discography ==
=== EPs ===
- Split (1993) (Massproduktion)
- Forever (1994)
- Cornflake King (1997)
- Window
- The Pilot
- Don't Let The World Catch You Crying
- Imagination
- Oh God I Think I'm In Love (2014)

=== Albums ===
- Being Young (1995)
- Being Young - Special Edition (1995)
- Everyone's Invited (1996)
- Six-0-Seven (1998) (Stockholm Records)
- Trampoline (2002)
- 5am (February 2006)
- It Sure Looks Like The Confusions But It Sounds More Acoustic (2007)
- The Story Behind the Story (March 2008)
- A Permanent Marker (November 2009)
- The Confusions (September 2014)
- Black Silhouettes (Double vinyl album) (April 2021)
- Black Silhouettes - The Nuclear Ghosts (August 2021)
- TOLV (November 2023)
- Sci-Fi Romance (November 2024)
- Songs For Films (November 2024)
- Sci-Fi Romance - the vinyl version (Mars 2025)

=== Singles ===
- "All Dressed Up" (Forever)
- "Steroid Hearts" (Everyone's Invited)
- "Raining Cigarettes" (Six-0-Seven)
- "The Pilot" (Trampoline)
- Tonight (Trampoline)
- "Painted People" ('The Trampoline)
- "Artificial" (5am)
- "Don't Let The World Catch You Crying"
- "Thin" (The Story Behind the Story)
- "The Logo" (The Story Behind the Story)
- "Strangers" (The Story Behind the Story)
- "I Won't Be Sober When This Is Over" ('A Permanent Marker)
- "Boys will be Boys" ('A Permanent Marker)
- "It's So Quiet, It's So Cold" (2014 - The Confusions)
- "Oh God I Think I´m in Love" (2014 - The Confusions)
- "Pavement" (2014 - The Confusions)
- "Det Är Här Vi Står Idag" (2015 - Officiell låt till GIF-Sundsvall)
- "You Spit When You Talk" (2015)
- "Varje Ögonblick Vårt Eget" (2016)
- "LIPS" (2018)
- "LIPS remix by Polygrim" (2018)
- "Don't You Fall In Love" (2018)
- "I'm Not Afraid / True" (2018)
- "So Long" (2018)
- "I Wish We Could Swim Now / Are You Breathing Under Water" (2018)
- "Sunday Mornings" (2019)
- "Close Your Eyes" (2019)
- "The Radio" (Cover for Massproduktion Christmas album) (2019)
- "Electric" (2020)
- "Like Science Fiction" (2020)
- "Suburbian Ghosts" (2020)
- "Tangerine Sky" (2021)
- "Arrow" (2021)
- "Into The Twilight" (2021)
- "Don't Say That True Love Waits For Everyone" (2021)
- "1664" (2022)
- "Fell Out Of Bed" (2022)
- "You Go! You Go! You Go!" (2022)
- "It's Only A Mistake" (2022)
- "Killer At The Airport" (2023)
- "Rain Rain Rain" (2023)
- "Lonely Souls" (2023)
- "The Fool" (2023)
- "Anybody Out There" (2024)
- "Waterfall" (2024)
- "Everybody's Running Away" (2024)
- Black Birds Of Berlin (2024)
- "The Kid" (2024)
