= The Long Long Holiday =

- Les Grandes Grandes Vacances
- Genre: History; Adventure
- Created by: Delphine Maury; Olivier Vinuesa
- Directed by: Paul Leluc
- Composer: Syd Matters
- Country of origin: France
- No. of seasons: 1
- No. of episodes: 10 (sometimes shown as 5)

Production
- Executive producers: Les Armateurs: Reginald de Guillebon
- Running time: 49 minutes (26 minutes for segment)
- Production companies: Les Armateurs; Blue Spirit Animation

Original release
- Network: France 3
- Release: April 20 – April 30, 2015

The Long Long Holiday (Les Grandes Grandes Vacances) is a French animated series broadcast in 2015 on France 3, which tells the story of the German occupation of France during the Second World War through the perspectives of children in Normandy.

In September 1939, Ernest and his little sister Colette are welcomed by their maternal grandparents in a fictional village named Grangeville (based on an actual village, Varangeville-sur-Mer), near Dieppe in Normandy. The short vacation becomes semi-permanent when their father goes off to fight, following the mobilization of France to fight the invading German Army, and the poor health of their mother, required to leave to be treated for tuberculosis in a sanatorium in Switzerland. The two little Parisians discover life in the countryside during wartime, including occupation, Resistance, deprivation, but also life with friends.

The ten-episode mini-series (sometimes shown as five episodes, including on Netflix and Amazon Prime Video) was created by Émile Bravo (graphic design), Paul Leluc (director), and Delphine Maury (author), and produced by Les Armateurs Cyber Group Studios. Olivier Vinuesa and Alain Serluppus assisted Delphine Maury at the beginning of the writing on the narrative arc, then Guillaume Mautalent and Sébastien Oursel became co-writers on the whole series, along with Timothée de Fombelle, who also lent a hand on the arc of the ten episodes. Syd Matters composed the music for the series.

In 2016 the show won Best Children's TV Program by the Paris Radio and Television Club.

== Characters ==
- Robinsons: The group formed by the main characters of the series. Ernest names their club after the story of Robinson Crusoe.
  - Colette and Ernest Bonhoure: Siblings who are left with their grandparents in Grangeville while their parents are away. An elderly, unseen Colette narrates the series. At the start of the series, Ernest is 10 years old while Colette is only 6. At the end of the series, Ernest is 15 and Colette is 11. Colette probably has a small crush on Gaston Morteau at the end of the series.
  - Lily (Muguette): A self-sufficient girl who starts as an outcast, nicknamed "Sea-scum" and considered a witch by Ernest and Jean before they get to know her. She has a (big) crush on Jean, probably since the beginning of the series. She is 13 years old at the start of the series and 18 at the end.
  - Jean Guibert: Son of the mayor. Over the course of the series, he develops a (big) crush on Lily. He is 12 years old at the start of the series and 17 at the end.
  - Fernand Geber: A Jewish Alsatian, he is at first accused of being a German spy due to his accent. He is later taken by the Nazis for refusing to wear a yellow badge and ultimately killed in the Auschwitz concentration camp. He is 14 years old.
  - Marcel Morteau: The middle brother of the Morteau siblings. At first, he is antagonistic toward Ernest, calling him "city-boy" and pulling mean-spirited pranks on him, but they eventually become friends. He also picks fights with Fernand until he learns that their grandfathers had been close friends. He is 12 years old at the start of the series and 17 at the end.
  - Gaston Morteau: Marcel's younger brother. At first antagonistic toward the Bonhoures, he quickly develops a crush on Colette. He befriends Lieutenant Douglas, an RAF pilot who was shot down and parachuted into the Robinsons clubhouse. Gaston reminds Douglas of his own son when the pilot shows him a photo. He is 8 years old at the start of the series and 13 at the end.
  - Paul Tissier: Though not an official member of the group, he's the kind son of a crooked shopowner who manages to warn the other Robinsons that the Nazi sympathizer Durand had found their hideout and was leading the Nazis to it. He has a small crush on Rosalie Apfelbaum, a Jewish girl and friend of Colette. He is 11 at the start of the series and 16 at the end. It is unknown if he was offered to become an official Robinson after the occupation, but if he was, he most likely declined to become part of the group since he was not seen with the other Robinsons at the end of the series.
- Robert Bonhoure: (voiced by:Cédric Dumond) Colette and Ernest's father, who was part of the French Army when the war started. He fought on the Maginot Line until he was captured. He joins the Resistance after spending time in the Stalag. He is 35 years old.
- Lucy Bonhoure: Nicknamed "Lulu" by her husband, and Ernest and Colette's mother, Lucy suffers from tuberculosis for most of the series, and had to go to Switzerland for treatment. She made a full recovery by the end of the invasion of Normandy. She is 32 years old.
- Grannily and Grandpalou: Also known as Emilie and René, they are Ernest and Colette's maternal grandparents. The children live with them until the German occupation of France ended. René was a dear friend of Robert's father, who was killed when the latter served with René in the French Army in World War I. They're 57 and 55 years old respectively.
- Mr. Herpin:(voiced by:Philippe Catoire) A veteran of World War I, he's the schoolteacher for most of the children in the series. He was also known by the alias "Sparrowhawk," as the leader of a local Resistance group. As the occupation progresses, he tasks the Robinsons with aiding the Resistance by distributing fliers and performing reconnaissance. Near the end of the invasion of Normandy, Mr. Herpin is injured and ultimately dies in a gunfight with German troops, buying the Robinsons time to escape.
- Mr. Tissier: Grangeville's crooked grocer, Paul's father. Although he’s not a Nazi sympathizer, he works with the corrupt German soldier, Hans by hoarding essential goods to sell them on the black market.
- Hans: A German soldier who abuses requisition to steal food to sell on the black market with Mr. Tissier. After Otto reports him about abusing requisition, he was sent to the Eastern Front in exchange for not being sent to military prison. He later steals Colette's pet pig Muddy and eats it and shoots the Morteaus' dog for barking at him. When he tried to take the Morteaus hostage and have them killed, he was shot and killed by Otto.
- Otto: A kind-hearted German soldier quartered at the Morteaus' household, he grows to love the children's mother, ultimately betraying the Nazis by saving the Morteau family and murdering Hans in the process. At the end of the occupation, he is arrested and almost executed by the Resistance, but was released due to intervention from the Robinsons and Robert. Thanks to Robert and Mr. Guibert, Otto was spared the prison camp and remained in Grangeville, working in the surrounding farms, and living there.
- Jeanne Morteau: Mother of the Morteau brothers. Over the course of the series, she falls in love with Otto.
- Pierre Morteau: (voiced by:Julien Crampon) The eldest son of Jeanne and brother of Marcel and Gaston. He joins the Resistance after learning he was about to be forced into compulsory work service.
- Jean-Baptiste: (voiced by:Benjamin Bollen) Grangeville's high-spirited postman and friend of Emilie and René.
- Colonel Von Krieger: The German garrison commander of Grangeville. Whenever an act of resistance was committed, he always put pressure on the village, from destroying the cafe's radio to threatening to bring the SS to Grangeville. He was wounded in the arm and fled the village with two other German soldiers after the Resistance attacked his headquarters (the Gilbert home) on the last night of the occupation of Grangeville. It is not known what happened to him afterwards. He could have been captured by the Resistance or escaped to Germany.
- Durand: (voiced by:Antoine Lelandais) A self-serving Frenchman who becomes a collaborator, always blatantly trying to get disloyal French folk in trouble with the Nazis. He was supposedly responsible for Fernand's death, being the one who turned him in for not wearing a yellow badge. During the course of the series, Durand works tirelessly to try and find the Robinsons' hideout. He is ultimately arrested and executed by the French Resistance for his misdeeds.
- Rosalie Apfelbaum: Nicknamed "Rosie", she is a young Jewish girl and a friend of Colette. At one point, she was forced to wear a yellow badge. During the Dieppe Raid, she escaped to England with Lieutenant Douglas, a British pilot the Robinsons nursed back to health, and the retreating Allied soldiers. Paul Tissier has a small crush on Rosie.
- Lieutenant Douglas: A Royal Air Force fighter pilot who was shot down and parachuted into the Robinson clubhouse. The Robinsons went on to nurse the wounded pilot. During Douglas' stay, he befriended Gaston and gave him his RAF pocket watch before leaving. Douglas is fond of Gaston as the boy reminds him of his own son when he shows Gaston a photo. He later briefly returned to the clubhouse during Operation Jubilee before he, Rosie, and the retreating Allied soldiers left for England.
- Antoine: A student of Mister Herpin that always had a habit of being in a daze, which nearly got him run over at least twice. This habit eventually causes him to wander into an off-limits beach, resulting in him being blown up by a land mine. The Robinsons created a memorial for him at the Robinson clubhouse.
- Violette Tissier: Nicknamed "Violette", is a woman in charge of the bar of Grangeville. She is seen in almost every episode and is the first one to comment on the French defeat in the exodus episode and is almost executed alongside other townsfolk in the last episode and attends the liberation party, she is believed to be engaged with Mr. Tissier.
- Henri: A side character that appears with Antoine (who is presumably his friend) in the first episode.
- Douglas, (Canadian Soldier): The assumed leader of the Canadians that come to liberate Grangeville in the final episode, almost shooting the Robinsons.
- Hetwald: A Canadian soldier who appears in the last episode, presumably being the one responsible for the army getting lost and taking long to get to Grangeville.

== Voice cast ==
=== English dub ===
- Niamh Clarke - Colette
- Joanna Ruiz - Ernest
- Joseph Taylor - Fernand
- Janet James - Gaston
- Jack Graham - Jean
- Mark Flanagan - Jean-Baptiste
- Fiona Clarke Gain - Jeanne
- Anna Wilson-Hall - Lily (Muguette)
- Melissa Sinden - Grannyli
- Ben Cusick - Marcel
- Julie Ann Dean - Mrs. Guibert
- Eric Meyers - Mr. Guibert
- Jonathan Keeble - Mr. Herpin, Mr. Tissier
- Keith Faulkner - Mr. Durand
- Christine Dawe - Old Colette
- Terence Mann - Grandpalou, Narrator Module M
- Lorenzo Rodriguez - Paul
- Michael Ledwich - Pierre
- Jimmy Hibbert - Priest, BBC Speaker
- Joe Mills - Robert
- Karen West - Violette Tissier
- Delia Corrie - Narrator Module F
- Rob Foster - Antoine

=== French dub ===
- Clara Quilichini - Colette
- Ian Marshall - Douglas, Canadian Soldier
- Julien Crampon - Ernest
- Milan Morotti - Fernand
- Dorothée Pousséo - Gaston
- Marion Game - Grannyli
- Alexandre Aubry - Grandpalou
- Rainer Sievert - Hans
- Benjamin Bollen - Jean
- Benoit du Pac - Jean-Baptiste
- Magali Rosenzweig - Jeanne
- Pauline Brunner - Lily (Muguette)
- Laurence Breheret - Lucy
- Sauvane Delanoe - Marcel
- Laura Blanc - Mrs. Guibert
- Antoine Lelandais - Mr. Durand
- Jean-Pascal Quilinchini - Mr. Guibert
- Philippe Catoire - Mr. Herpin, Chaulin
- Jérémy Prevost - Mr. Tissier
- Régine Blaess-Varon - Old Colette
- Johannes Oliver Hamm - Otto
- Marie Facundo - Paul, Rosie
- Julien Alluguette - Pierre
- Michael Dodane - Priest, Police Officer
- Cédric Dumond - Robert
- Anna Mathot - Violette Tissier
- Jochen Hägele - Von Krieger, Joquet
- Dominic Gould - Canadian Soldier

== Episode list ==
English Language episode titles when shown as five episodes

1. The Long, Long Holiday
2. The Exodus
3. Facing the Enemy
4. Resistant Youths
5. The End of the War

English Language episode titled when shown as ten episodes

1. The Long, Long Holiday
2. The Strange War
3. The Exodus
4. The Secret
5. Letters to My Father
6. Fell from the Sky
7. To Your Star
8. The Small Supporters
9. The Long Sobs
10. The Wind of Freedom
