= Tingsek =

Swedish musician and producer (born 1978)

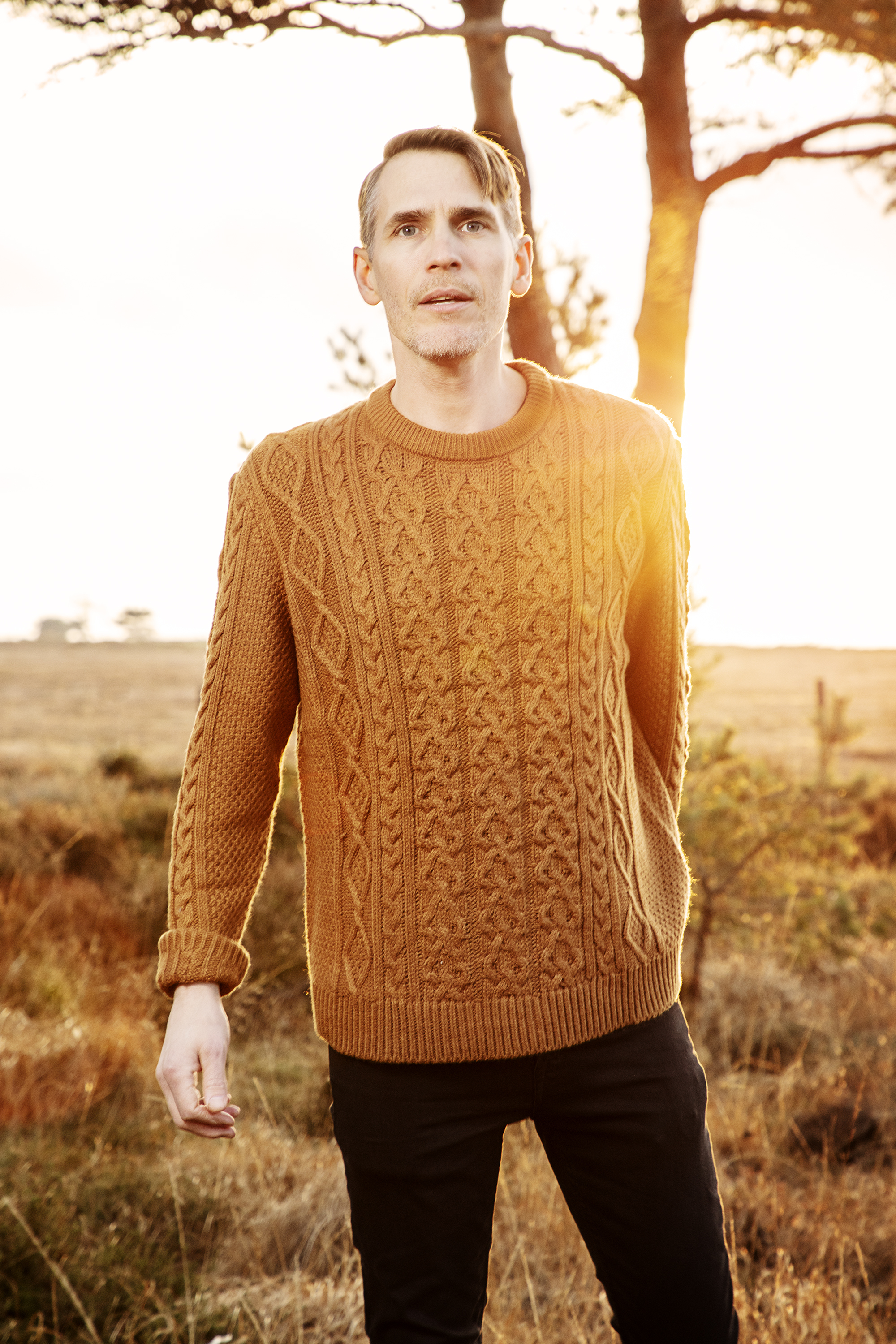

Background information
- Born: December 19, 1978 (age 47)
- Genres: Soul, alternative
- Occupations: Musician, songwriter, producer
- Instruments: Vocals, guitar, keyboards, drums, bass, pedal steel
- Years active: 2005 - present
- Labels: World Of Its Own Recordings, Universal Music Sweden
- Website: tingsek.com

Tingsek is a Swedish musician and producer from Södra Sandby, Sweden.

== Career ==
To date, Tingsek has released seven albums. “Tingsek” (2005),”World of Its Own” (2006) and “Too Many Feelings at the Same Time” (2008) were all released on Universal Music. This partnership came to an end in 2009 which prompted him to start World Of Its Own Recordings, and this is the label on which ”Restless Soul” (2009) and "Tingsek & Vindla String Quartet feat. Måns Mernsten" (2011) was released.

Originally only available in digital form, ”Tingsek & Vindla String Quartet feat. Måns Mernsten" was released after the completion of a tour where the aim had been to rearrange some of Tingsek's earlier releases and thus produce something new and fresh.

An exclusive vinyl edition of the album, a total of 300 numbered and signed copies, was released in April 2012.

Early that same year, Tingsek produced the Isak Strand vs. Toe album ”Theory of Everything”. Later in 2012 he went on tour in Europe & North America together with Allen Stone, and spent the remainder of 2013 playing live shows throughout Europe.

From 2014 and up until recently, Tingsek has co-written, engineered and produced the majority of Allen Stone's new album "Radius" (released in May 2015).

However, parallel to his musical collaborations and experiments Tingsek never stopped creating and working on his own music, and on October 14, 2016 his sixth studio album "Amygdala" was released.

The third album to be released on Tingsek's own label World Of Its Own Recordings, "Amygdala" is an album not unlike his earlier work but with a different musical direction, built on new premises in order to find a new sound. Working closely with Måns Mernsten, the end result is an album much darker, more retrospective than the albums that came before. Named after the section of the brain responsible for processing memories and feelings, "Amygdala" is heavily influenced by memories, nostalgia and a strong desire to create a coherent album with a consistent sound while simultaneously finding new ways of expressing himself; both musically and lyrically but also in regards to his vocals as well as the production of the album. Tingsek will initially promote the new album by touring Sweden and Norway during the last months of 2016 and the rest of Europe in 2017.

Tingsek's most recent album "Home" was released in May, 2021.

== Collaborations ==
Some of the artists and groups Tingsek has played and collaborated with over the years include Timbuktu, Damn!, Loosegoats, Sideshow Bob, Fjärde Världen, Adam Tensta, Slakah the Beatchild, Ane Brun, Allen Stone, Ebrahim, Svante Lodén, Chords, Pauline, Haley Reinhart, Sarah Dawn Finer, Isak Strand vs. Toe, Gaby and The Guns, Helt Off, Emily King and Bernhoft.

== Discography ==
Year	Albums
2005	Tingsek
2006	World Of Its Own
2008	Too Many Feelings At The Same Time
2008	Too Many Feelings At The Same Time (Bonus Version)
2009	Restless Soul
2011	Tingsek & Vindla String Quartet feat. Måns Mernsten
2016	Amygdala
2021	Home

Year	Singles & EP
2006	World Of Its Own
2007	Proud To Be Part Of These Days
2008	I Stand Here Still
2009	Six Years
2011	What a Difference a Day Makes
2016	Miss Brand New
2016	The Fiddlers
2017	The Change (Part2)
2017	Lie To Me
2017	Miss Brand New (Mountain Bird Remix)
2017	Live at Ljupet - Sessions 2016
2019	Miracle Of Love
2020	Our Song
2020	Family
2020	Genuine
2020	Live from home
2021	Resonate

=== Produced by Tingsek ===
==== Album ====
- Radius (Allen Stone, 2015)
- Theory of Everything (Isak Strand vs. Toe, 2012)

===== Songs =====
- Easier (Ane Brun, 2005)
- Stuck On (feat. Tingsek) (Shirin, 2018)

=== Appears On ===
- Easier (Ane Brun, Tingsek, 2005)
- Innocent Man (Chords, Tingsek, 2008)
- War Within (Beatchild, Ebrahim, Tingsek, 2010)
- Overload (Adam Tensta, Tingsek, Dave Exit, 2011)
- Perfect Summer Night (The Slakadeliqs, Tingsek, 2012)
- Love Judge (The Slakadeliqs, Tingsek, Ebrahim, 2012)
- Nine 2 Five (The Slakadeliqs, Tingsek, 2012)
- Stuck On (feat. Tingsek) (Shirin, 2018)

== Websites ==
- Tingsek Website
