= Junge Junge =

German producer duo

- Genres: Electronic music
- Years active: 2013–present
- Labels: Universal Music Sweden
- Members: Michael Noack; Rochus Grolle
- Website: jungejunge.net

Junge Junge is a German producer duo made up of DJs Michael Noack and Rochus Grolle. Mainly producing electronic dance music since 2006, they are signed to Universal Music Sweden and Island Records, releasing their EP Beautiful Girl on July 15, 2016.

== Discography ==
=== EPs ===
- 2016: Beautiful Girl

=== Singles ===
- 2013: "Why" (Rochus Grolle & Michael Noack feat. Alex Landon)
- 2015: "Beautiful Girl"
- 2016: "Run Run Run"
- 2017: "Postcard"(feat. Kyle Pearce)
- 2017: "I Don't Love You (I'm Just Lonely)"
- 2017: "I'm The One"
- 2018: "Catch 22" (feat. Valentijn)
- 2018: "Make You Feel Like"
- 2019: "Wicked Hearts" (feat. Jamie Hartman)
- 2019: "A Walk on the Beach" (feat. Redward Martin)
- 2020: "Innocence"
- 2020: "Drunk Talk"
- 2020: "Vallut Bass" (with AKA AKA)
- 2020: "This Summer" (with Will Church)
- 2021: "Call on me" (with Moguai)
- 2021: "Queen On A Throne" (with Joe Taylor)
- 2021: "Closer" (with Sonofsteve)
- 2021: "Ride or Die"
- 2021: "All Shook Up"
- 2022: "Again and Again"
- 2022: "Wild Things"
- 2023: "Paradise"
- 2023: "Still I Bleed"
- 2024: "Here"

Remixes

- 2015: Charlie Puth - "One Call Away"
- 2016: Aka Aka & Thalstroem feat. Chasing Kurt - "True"
- 2016: Charlie Puth feat. Selena Gomez - "We Don't Talk Anymore"
- 2017: Kyle Pierce - "Tick Tock"
- 2018: Vargas & Lagola - "Roads"
