= Nina Kinert =

Swedish musician

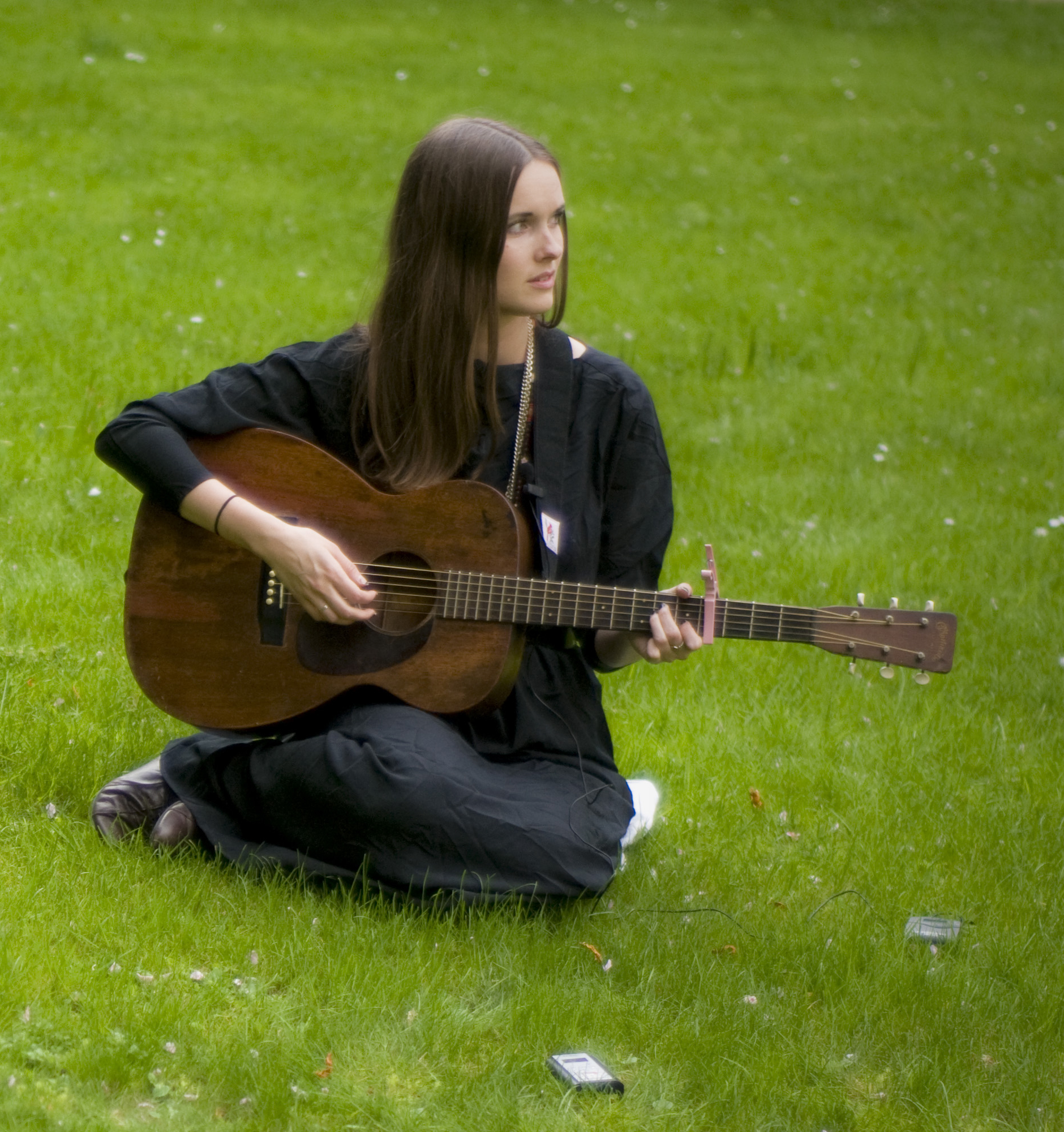

Background information
- Also known as: Nina K
- Born: Nina Micaela Kinert; 26 September 1983 (age 42); Stockholm, Sweden
- Instruments: piano, guitar
- Labels: Ninkina Recordings
- Website: http://www.ninakinert.com/

Nina Kinert Levahn (born Nina Micaela Kinert, 26 September 1983), is a Swedish musician/artist. Her musical style is a mix between pop, folk and electronic music.

== History ==
In 2004 she released her first album Heartbreaktown on her own label Another Records. The following EP Visitor and the album Let There Be Love were issued on the Swedish branch of V2 Records in 2005. In 2006-07 she was featured by Norwegian singer Ane Brun on her concert tours (Live in Scandinavia, 2007).

Beside the support of the already established Brun, Kinert rose to prominence in 2007 following the use of her song "Through Your Eyes" in a worldwide publicity campaign for the Swedish car company SAAB (a song she did not write, but lent her voice to). In October 2007, she was featured on the Steve Jansen album Slope, singing on "Playground Martyrs (Reprise)" (another version of that song on the album featured Jansen's brother David Sylvian).

In November 2010, she released Red Leader Dream, an album inspired by the Star Wars trilogy. It was issued by her new own label NinkinaRecordings.

== Discography ==
- Heartbreaktown (Another, 2004)
- Visitor (EP, V2 Sweden, 2005)
- Let There Be Love (V2, 2005. Re-released with bonus track "Through Your Eyes" in 2007)
- Pets & Friends (Another, 2008)
- Red Leader Dream (Ninkina, 2010)
- On Ice (Ninkina, 2015)
- Romantic (Ninkina, 2018)
- In Twos (EP, NinKina, 2018)
- Religious (NinKina, 2023)
- Chorals (NinKina, 2024)
