= Heartbeat Detector =

- Original French-language poster
- French: La Question humaine
- Directed by: Nicolas Klotz
- Written by: François Emmanuel; Elisabeth Perceval
- Produced by: Sophie Dulac
- Starring: Mathieu Amalric; Michael Lonsdale; Édith Scob
- Cinematography: Josée Deshaies
- Edited by: Rose-Marie Lausson
- Music by: Syd Matters
- Distributed by: Sophie Dulac Distribution
- Release date: 12 September 2007
- Running time: 143 minutes
- Country: France
- Language: French

Heartbeat Detector (French: La Question humaine) is a 2007 French film directed by Nicolas Klotz and starring Mathieu Amalric. The film is based on the 2000 novel by François Emmanuel.

== Plot ==
The film centers on Kessler, a psychologist in the human resources department of the French branch of a long-established German firm. The firm has recently dismissed 50% of its workforce on criteria devised by Kessler. Rose, the vice-president of the company, requests Kessler to look into whether Jüst, the CEO is fit to do his job. The CEO discovers Kessler is investigating him and tells him that Rose, whose previous name was Kraus, has a Nazi past.

Kessler then discovers that Jüst's father headed a Nazi extermination group on the Eastern Front during World War II. Jews placed in the back of a closed truck were killed with the truck's exhaust gas. A device called a 'heartbeat detector' was then applied to discover any who had survived. Tormented by this memory Jüst attempts suicide.

The action then shifts from the company's politics to The Holocaust. An analogy is drawn between the desubjectivized corporate language used in downsizing and that used in the Nazi chain of command.

== Cast ==
- Mathieu Amalric as Simon Kessler
- Michael Lonsdale as Mathias Jüst
- Laetitia Spigarelli as Louisa
- Delphine Chuillot as Isabelle
- Édith Scob as Lucy Jüst
- Jean-Pierre Kalfon as Karl Rose
- Rémy Carpentier as Jacques Paolini

== Reception ==
The film has been considered in Film Comment as "a response to and comment on the present—the era of neoliberal capitalism, industrial downsizing, and the displaced and disaffected who do, or don’t, manage to adjust." Other scholars pointed out how the film suggests a provocative parallel between neoliberal capitalism and the technical ideology that underpinned the Holocaust.

== Trivia ==
There are two consecutive performances that the main character watches, one by a flamenco singer, Miguel Poveda, the other by a Portuguese group.

== Awards and nominations ==
- Copenhagen Film Festival (Denmark)
  - Won: Golden Swan – Best Actor (Mathieu Amalric)
- César Awards (France)
  - Nominated: Best Actor – Supporting Role (Michael Lonsdale)
- Gijón Film Festival (Spain)
  - Won: Best Actor (Mathieu Amalric)
  - Won: Best Art Direction (Antoine Platteau)
  - Nominated: Grand Prix Asturias – Best Feature (Nicolas Klotz)
- São Paulo Film Festival (Brazil)
  - Won: Critics Award – International (Nicolas Klotz)

== Festivals ==
- Director's Fortnight
