= Long Way North =

- Film poster
- Directed by: Rémi Chayé
- Written by: Claire Paoletti; Patricia Valeix; Fabrice de Costil
- Produced by: Ron Dyens; Claus Toksvig Kjaer; Henri Magalon
- Starring: Christa Théret; Féodor Atkine; Thomas Sagois
- Edited by: Benjamin Massoubre
- Music by: Jonathan Morali
- Production companies: Sacrebleu Productions; Maybe Movies; France 3 Cinéma; 2 Minutes; Nørlum
- Distributed by: Diaphana Films (France)
- Release dates: 16 June 2015 (Annecy); 27 January 2016 (France)
- Running time: 80 minutes
- Countries: France; Denmark
- Languages: English; Danish; French
- Box office: $1.2 million

Long Way North (French: Tout en haut du monde, lit. 'At the very top of the world') is a 2015 animated film directed by Rémi Chayé. The film premiered at the Annecy International Animation Film Festival, where it won the Audience Award.

== Plot ==
In 19th-century Saint Petersburg, a young girl named Sasha watches as her beloved grandfather – a noted explorer named Oloukine – departs upon a voyage to reach the North Pole on board the Davaï, a specially designed icebreaker built to withstand the harsh arctic conditions and paid for by the Tsar of Russia. After years without word from the vessel, the Tsar declares a reward of 1 million rubles for proof of the Davaï's final resting place, effectively declaring the vessel sunk with all hands.

Sasha, now 15 and about to host her debutante ball, sneaks into a newly built library wing to be named for her grandfather in order to view the many artifacts he had donated, but while there, she overhears a conversation in which Prince Tomsky belittles her grandfather's achievements. Tomsky considers Oloukine's failure to return as a political humiliation to the Tsar, who had invested heavily in the expedition, and so Tomsky intends to see that Oloukine's name does not adorn the building. Attending Sasha's ball, he loudly feigns outrage when Sasha points out that her grandfather's notes detail how he took a different route than the one assumed by the Tsar's advisors, and after Tomsky storms from the building, the other guests follow him, keen to distance themselves from the family. Denied a position as the ambassador to Rome because of Tomsky's deception, Sasha's father blames his daughter for the family's fall from grace.

Sasha runs away from home, traveling by what means she can to the coast, where she locates a vessel – the Norge – with a reinforced hull, which indicates that it is built for travel to the icy Northern seas where Sasha wishes to go. After negotiating passage with Larson, a man falsely claiming to be the captain, the Norge departs without her and she is forced to wait for its return while working as a dogsbody in a tavern. When the Norge returns, Sasha uses her grandfather's notes to convince the real captain – Lund – that she can locate the Davaï, meaning Lund and his crew may claim the Tsar's 1 million ruble reward. Lund is bound by honor to grant Sasha passage, as Larson is both his first mate and brother, and Larson has gambled away the price of Sasha's passage during the unprofitable voyage from which the Norge and its crew have just returned.

The crew at first warm to Sasha over the long course of the voyage, but when the Norge is destroyed because of Larson's lack of experience, the crew turn upon Sasha as rations dwindle and they begin to blame her for their dire predicament. Days into their seemingly futile journey across the Arctic snows, Sasha flees the group into a raging blizzard, where she is found by a husky she befriended on the ship, but rather than lead her back to the crew, the dog leads her to the frozen corpse of Oloukine. After retrieving his logbook, the corpse is carried away by the disintegration of the ice shelf. Sasha reads the log and discovers Oloukine's journey played out much as Sasha's has, with his men abandoning him on the ice-locked Davaï because of his obsessive quest to reach the North Pole, forcing him to go forth alone across the ice, where he claims to have reached the North Pole, but, weakened by hunger, sat down in the snow to better appreciate the harsh beauty of his surroundings, where he is found two years later by Sasha. Sasha uses the coordinates in the logbook to find the Davaï, and the crew use the dynamite they brought with them to blast the ship free and take it back out to sea. Exploring the vessel, Sasha finds her grandfather's cabin, in which a picture of her as a child rests upon his desk, frozen in place.

As the credits roll, a montage of still images play out: the Davaï's return to St. Petersburg, Tomsky's humiliation as Sasha is proven correct, and Sasha's reunion with her father. A post-credits scene also plays, in which the flag planted by Oloukine at the North Pole is blown away by the Arctic wind.

== Voice cast ==
Character	French	English
Sasha	Christa Théret	Chloé Dunn
Oloukine	Féodor Atkine	Geoffrey Greenhill
Katch	Thomas Sagols	Tom Perkins
Larson	Rémi Caillebot	Antony Hickling
Nadya	Audrey Sablé	Claire Harrison-Bullett
Tomsky	Fabien Briche	Tom Morton
Father	Rémi Bichet	Martin Vaughan Lewis
Mother	Julienne Degenne	Bibi Jacob
Maloney	Bruno Magnes	Leslie Clack
Lund	Loïc Houdré	Peter Hudson
Mowson	Cyrille Monge	Tom Morton
Frenchy	Stéphane Pouplard	Martin Vaughan Lewis
Olga	Delphine Braillo	Vivienne Vermes
Chancellor	Gabriel Le Doze	Leslie Clack
Galway	Boris Rehlinger	Damian Corcoran
Navy	Marc Bretonnière	Martin Vaughan Lewis

== Release ==
Long Way North was released theatrically in the US by Shout! Factory on September 30, 2016, and on DVD and Blu-ray on January 17, 2017.

== Accolades ==
List of awards and nominations
Award	Date	Category	Recipient(s)	Result	Ref(s)
Annie Awards	February 4, 2017	Best Animated Feature – Independent	Long Way North	Nominated	
San Diego Film Critics Society	December 12, 2016	Best Animated Film	Long Way North	Nominated	
Tokyo Anime Award Festival	2016	Grand Prize	Long Way North	Won	
COLCOA French Film Festival	2016	Coming Soon Award	Long Way North	Won	
Chicago International Children's Film Festival	2016	Children's Jury Prize – Animated Feature Film	Long Way North	Won	
Chicago International Children's Film Festival	2016	Adult Jury Prize 2nd Prize – Animated Feature Film	Long Way North	Won	
Annecy International Animation Film Festival	2015	Audience Award	Long Way North	Won	
