= When I'm Free =

Studio album by Ane Brun
- Released: September 4, 2015
- Studio: Atlantis, Stockholm; Gig Studio, Stockholm, Sweden; The Bigger Pink, Viklau; Hammarby, Stockholm
- Genre: Folk
- Label: Balloon Ranger Recordings
- Producer: Ane Brun; Tobias Fröberg

Ane Brun chronology
Rarities (2013)	When I'm Free (2015)	Leave Me Breathless (2017)

When I'm Free is the seventh studio album by Norwegian singer-songwriter Ane Brun. The album was released in 2015 with both a Standard Edition (10 tracks) and a Deluxe Edition (12 tracks).

== Track listing ==
All songs written by Ane Brun, except where noted.

1. "Hanging" – 5:37
2. "Black Notebook" – 3:57
3. "You Lit My Fire" – 4:57
4. "Directions" – 3:15
5. "Shape of a Heart" – 3:40
6. "Miss You More" – 3:36
7. "All We Want Is Love" – 4:23
8. "Still Waters" – 5:25
9. "Better Than This" – 5:34
10. "Signing Off" – 5:29

Bonus tracks on digital deluxe version

11. "Let in Your Love" – 4:20
12. "Hunting High and Low" (Paul Waaktaar-Savoy) – 3:43

== Personnel ==
- Ane Brun – vocals, backing vocals, acoustic guitar
- Dan Berglund – double bass on tracks 1, 4 and 9
- Sabina Ddumba – guest vocals on track 3
- John Eriksson – mallets/sounds on track 2; synth pads and synth bass outro on track 9
- Tobias Fröberg – cymbals on track 4; drum programming on tracks 1, 3 and 9; hi-hat on track 9; percussion programming on track 5; string machine on track 6; strings on tracks 1 and 7
- Thobias Gabrielsson – bass on tracks 3, 5 and 6
- Mikael Häggström – percussion on track 3
- Martin Hederos – keyboards on tracks 1, 3, 4, 5, 6, 8, 9 and 10
- Ola Hultgren – drums on tracks 3, 5 and 6; percussion on tracks 4 and 5
- Nina Kinert – backing vocals on track 3
- Johan Lindström – electric guitars on track 10; pedal steel guitar on tracks 2, 6, 8 and 9
- Linnea Olsson – backing vocals on tracks 3 and 6
- Lars Skoglund – drums on tracks 1, 2, 8 and 9; hi-hat on track 3
- Andreas Werlin – drums on tracks 3, 4 and 5; percussion on track 5

Strings on tracks 1 and 7

- Joakim Milder – conductor and string arrangements
- Violins: Torbjörn Bernhardsson, Ulf Forsberg, Hanna Göran, Iskander Komilov, Annette Mannheimer, Veronika Novotna, Bo Söderström
- Violas: Elisabeth Arnberg, Ingegerd Kierkegaard, Svein H. Martinsen, Ann Christin Wingård Ward
- Cellos: Jana Boutani, Helena Nilsson

Production

- Ane Brun – producer
- Tobias Fröberg – producer
- Johannes Berglund – additional production

== Charts ==
Chart (2015)	Peak position
Belgian Albums (Ultratop Flanders)	72
Belgian Albums (Ultratop Wallonia)	195
Dutch Albums (Album Top 100)	12
Norwegian Albums (VG-lista)	4
Swedish Albums (Sverigetopplistan)	3
