= Syd Matters =

French music band

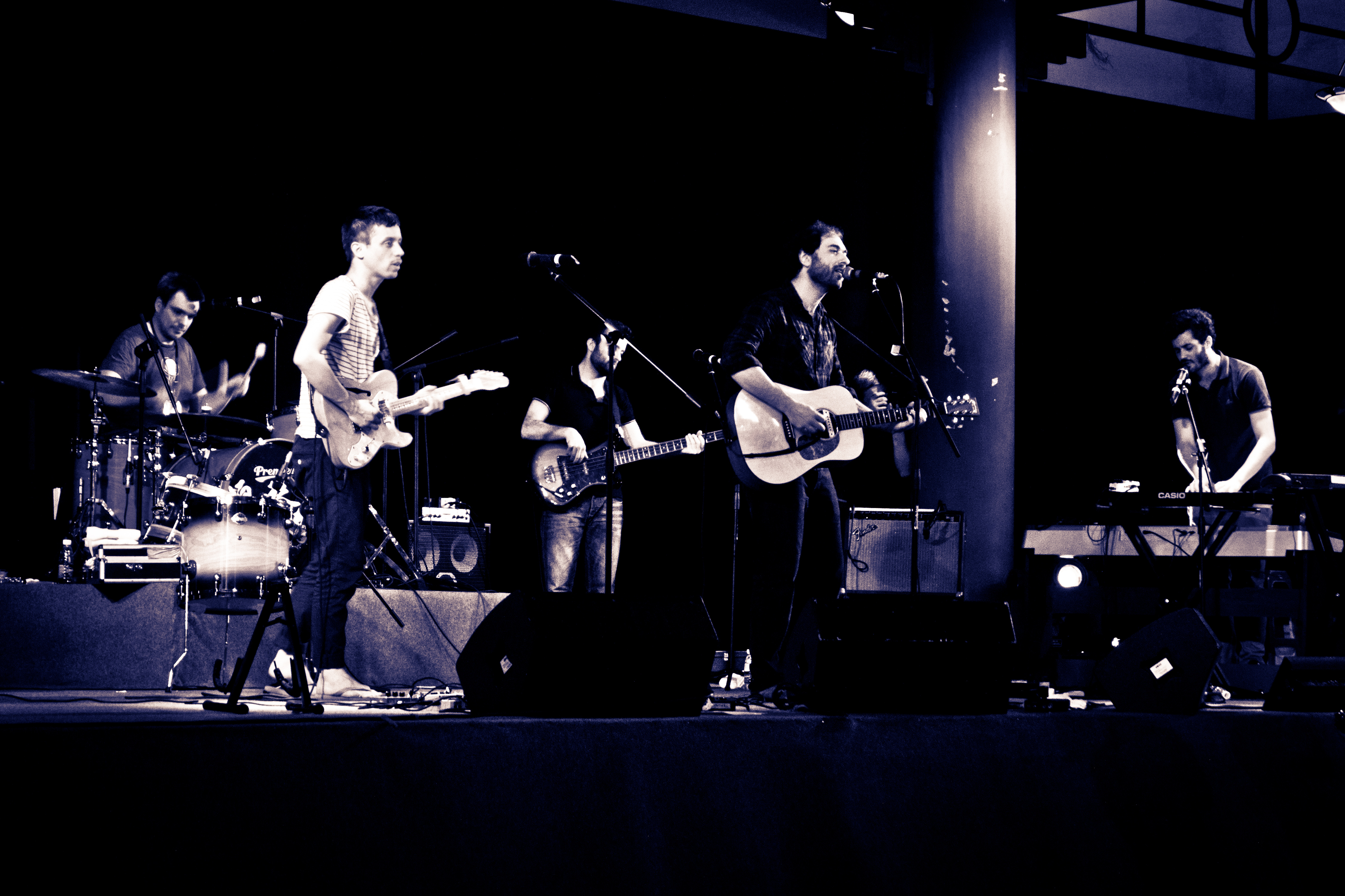
- Syd Matters performing in 2011

Background information
- Origin: Paris, France
- Genres: Indie pop, indie rock, psychedelic folk, post rock, folktronica
- Years active: 2001–2011, 2024–present
- Labels: Because Music, V2 Records, Third Side Records
- Members: Jonathan Morali; Olivier Marguerit; Rémi Alexandre; Jean-Yves Lozac'h; Clément Carle
- Website: Jonathan Morali

Syd Matters is a French indie band from Paris, France. The band was formed in 2002, and is fronted by composer Jonathan Morali. Other band members include Jean-Yves Lozac'h, Olivier Marguerit, Rémi Alexandre and Clément Carle.

== History ==
=== 2001–2002: Solo project beginnings and early career ===
Syd Matters originally started as a solo project by frontman Jonathan Morali, who started his performing career playing at small bars in 2001. The name Syd Matters comes from the slight modification of the names of two Pink Floyd members, Syd Barrett and Roger Waters. Morali won the inaugural CQFD contest in 2002, ran by French magazine Les Inrockuptibles, which earned him a recording contract with Third Side Records.

Morali's first release as Syd Matters was Fever In Winter, Shiver In June, an EP released in 2002.

=== 2003–2007: A Whisper and A Sigh and Someday We Will Foresee Obstacles ===
In 2003, Syd Matters released their debut album A Whisper and A Sigh. The album was mostly done by Morali solo with some help from others. After this album was released, Morali constructed a new quintet of bandmates, marking the band's official creation sometime in 2004. That same year, the band would record the second Syd Matters album, Someday We Will Foresee Obstacles, released in 2005. A mixture of folk and melancholic pop, the tracks combined slow melodies with acoustic instruments while holding true to roots in electronic music.

A duet with Ane Brun, titled "Little Lights", was released in 2005 on Brun's collaborative album Duets.

In 2006, a self-titled compilation CD containing various songs from the band's first two albums was released in America.

=== 2008–2019: Ghost Days, Brotherocean, and Life is Strange ===
The band released their third album Ghost Days in 2008, and their fourth album Brotherocean in 2010. During this time, Morali was also part of the French rock band the Palmtree Family.

In 2015, the band's songs "To All Of You" and "Obstacles" were featured in the 2015 video game Life Is Strange. Morali would also be the composer for the game's original soundtrack as well as its 2018 sequel Life Is Strange 2.

=== 2020–2023: Hiatus and anniversary releases ===
In 2021, in celebration of the record label's 20th anniversary, Third Side Records released new editions of A Whisper and A Sigh and Someday We Will Foresee Obstacles, which included bonus tracks and previously unreleased demos on the digital versions.

=== 2024–present: Touring comeback and A Gospel of Some Sort ===
In November 2024, the band performed a new song titled "The Holy Ghost" during an appearance on the Radio France station France Culture. The band also announced they were recording new songs.

In November 2025, the band's social media became active again, with the band announcing a show at L'Olympia for November 2026. In March 2026, Morali announced the band would be having additional Europe tour dates from October to December 2026.

On 29 April 2026, the band released the song "Many Years in the Making", their first new music release in over 15 years. A month later on 28 May, the song "Nuclear" was released. On 4 June, the band announced their fifth album A Gospel of Some Sort with a release date of September 4, 2026.

== Media appearances ==
Morali's songs "To All of You" ("American Girls") and "Hello Sunshine", a Super Furry Animals cover, were featured in the television series The O.C. in season 3's The Party Favor and season 4's The Metamorphosis, respectively. Additionally, "Obstacles" and "To All of You" were featured in Dontnod Entertainment's 2015 video game Life Is Strange. Morali also composed the original score for the game. The soundtrack to Life Is Strange won numerous awards including: best soundtrack at the 2015 PlayStation Universe awards, best soundtrack at the Game Informer Best of 2015 awards and best soundtrack at the Titanium Awards. Following this, Morali also collaborated with director Rémi Chayé to create the score for the animated film Long Way North (2015), where he included two tracks by Syd Matters in the soundtrack. In 2020, Syd Matters performed a composition of The Metamorphosis by Franz Kafka for French Radio in which the book was read by actor Micha Lescot with accompanying music.

== Reputation ==
Since Syd Matters’ debut, their experiments with genre have been continuously praised by critics. Their second album, "Someday We Will Foresee Obstacles", brought the band mainstream attention with a review in the 32nd issue of Music Week. The unique sound they produce has been said to draw inspiration from genres such as prog rock, dub music, and traditional pop, while also resembling that of singer-songwriter artists, but at its core is often considered a mix between folk and electronic genres. In their reviews, they have also been compared to other artists such as Fleet Foxes, Fionn Regan, Grandaddy, The Flaming Lips, and Nick Drake.

== Discography ==
Studio albums

- A Whisper and A Sigh (2003)
- Someday We Will Foresee Obstacles (2005)
- Ghost Days (2008)
- Brotherocean (2010)
- A Gospel of Some Sort (2026)

Extended plays

- Fever in Winter, Shiver in June (2002)
- Everything Else (2007)

Compilations

- Syd Matters (2006)

Filmography

- La Question Humaine (2007)
