= Ane Brun =

Norwegian musician (born 1976)

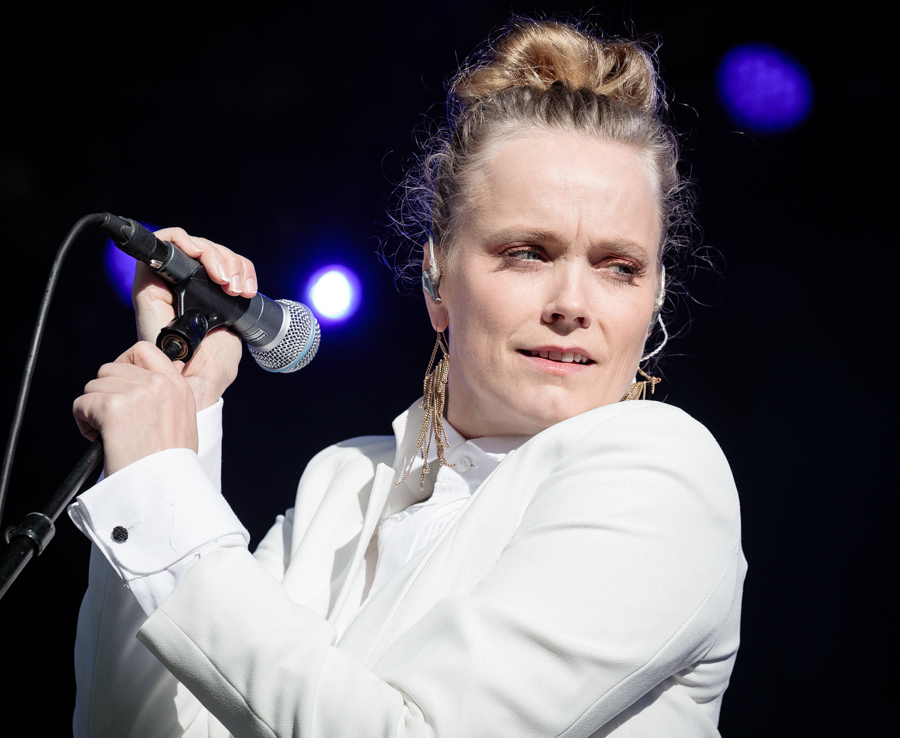
- Brun in 2017

Background information
- Born: Ane Kvien Brunvoll; 10 March 1976 (age 50); Molde, Norway
- Genres: Folk; pop; art pop
- Occupations: Musician; songwriter
- Instruments: Vocals; guitar; piano
- Works: Ane Brun discography
- Years active: 1998–present
- Labels: DetErMine; Balloon Ranger Recordings; V2; Cheap Lullaby (USA)
- Website: anebrun.com

Ane Brun (Norwegian pronunciation: [ˈɑ̂ːnə ˈbrʉːn]; born Ane Brunvoll on 10 March 1976) is a Norwegian singer-songwriter and guitarist of Sami origin who sings primarily in English. Since 2003, she has released eleven studio albums, six live albums, five compilations, one live DVD, and seven EPs. She has lived in Stockholm, Sweden, since 2001, where she writes, records, and runs her own label, Balloon Ranger Recordings.

== Early life and education ==
Ane Brunvoll is the daughter of lawyer Knut Anker Brunvoll (b. 1945) and jazz singer and pianist Inger Johanne Brunvoll (b. 1945). She grew up in a musical family in Molde, Norway. Her younger sister is singer Mari Kvien Brunvoll (b. 1984). Her older brother is photographer Bjørn Brunvoll (b. 1973).

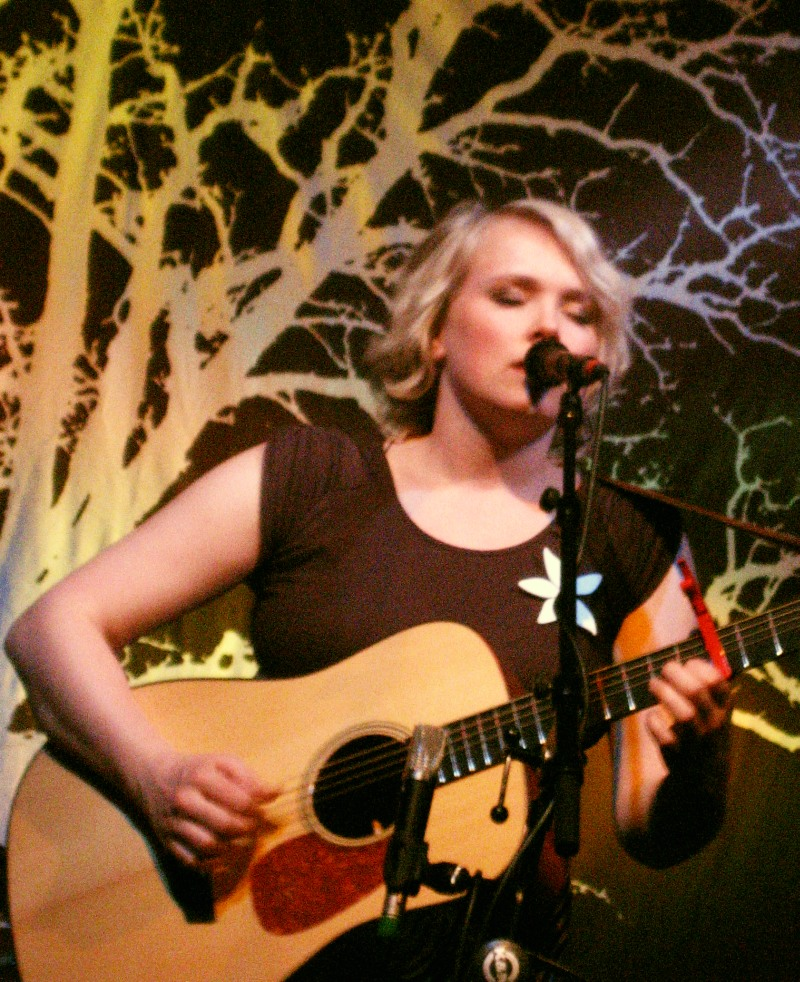
Ane Brun, Hamburg 2008

== Career ==
=== First album: 1999–2002 ===
After playing a few minor shows and recording her first demos in Bergen in 1999, Brun moved to Sweden, first to Uppsala and then to Stockholm in 2001, where she started to take her musical career seriously.

She recorded her debut album, Spending Time with Morgan, in 2002, in both Stockholm and Uppsala, with engineers and producers Katharina Nuttall, Cécile Grudet, and Kim Nelson. It was published on the DetErMine label, which she formed with Ellekari Larsson from the Swedish band the Tiny. The album was released in 11 European countries in 2003 through a licence/distribution deal with V2 Music.

=== Touring: 2002–2007 ===
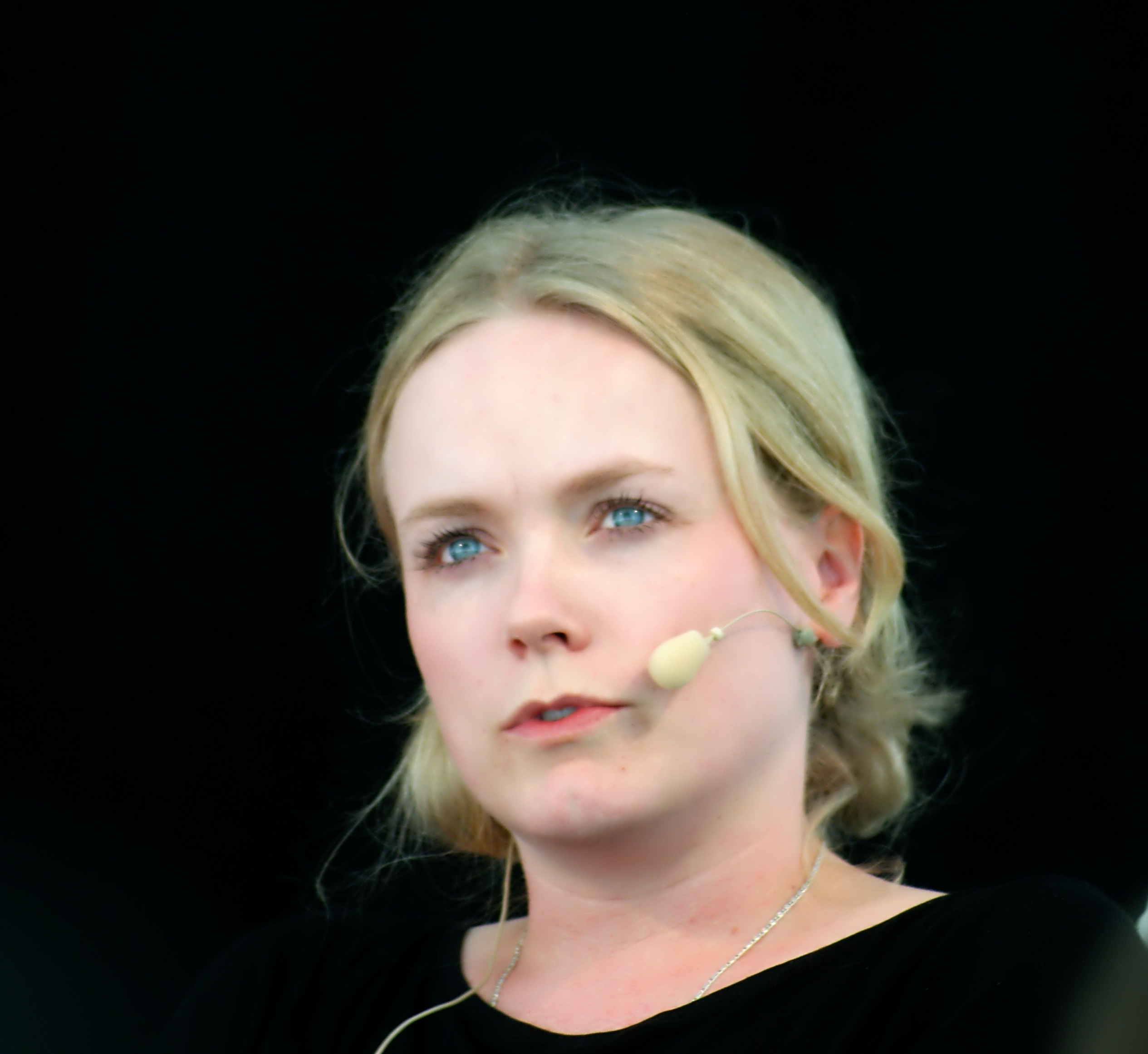
Brun at the Kulturfestival in Stockholm, 13 August 2010

Brun subsequently toured across Europe, and in 2005, she released her next record, A Temporary Dive, which included a duet with Canadian singer-songwriter Ron Sexsmith. The album was well received, picking up positive reviews in publications such as Time magazine and The Independent. Brun received several award nominations that year and took home the Spellemannpris, the Norwegian equivalent of the Grammies, for Best Female Artist.

Later in 2005, Brun went on to record a collaborative album titled Duets. Besides another song with Sexsmith, it also included input from Syd Matters, Teitur, Lars Bygdén, and Tingsek, among others. The single "Lift Me", recorded with the band Madrugada, won her another Spellemannpris.

In 2007, she released her first concert album, titled Live in Scandinavia, which featured Swedish musician Nina Kinert on "Lift Me".

=== Later work: 2008–2013 ===
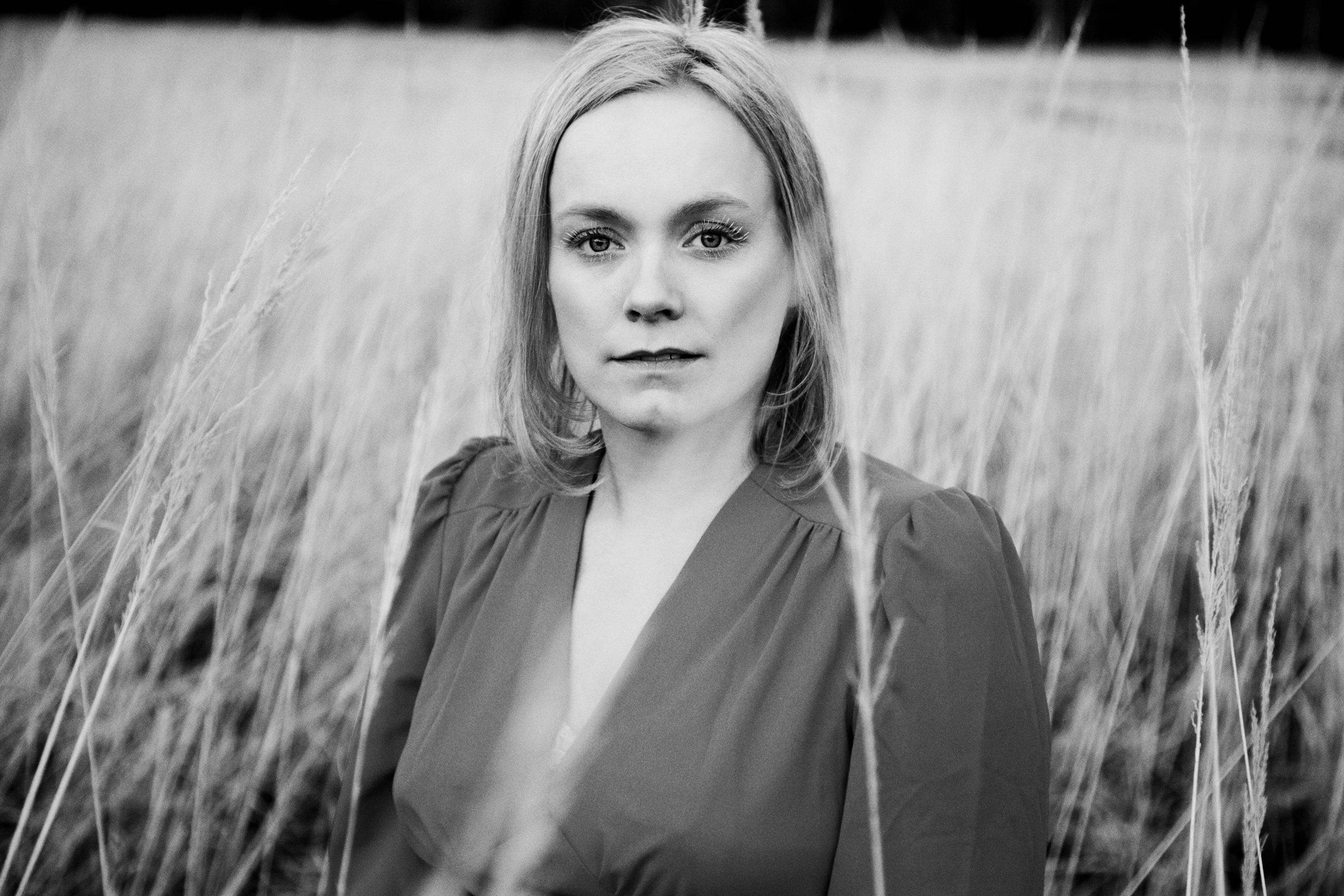
Ane Brun, 2012

In 2008, Brun released her fourth studio album, Changing of the Seasons, which was produced by Valgeir Sigurðsson. It included string arrangements by American composer Nico Muhly. Later the same year, Brun issued the album Sketches, which included acoustic demo versions of the songs from Changing of the Seasons. The Sketches tour featured a stripped-down, sparse sound, with musicians Rebekka Karijord, Jennie Abrahamson, and Linnea Olsson.

In 2009, Brun performed at the Stockholm Concert Hall, a concert that was filmed and released as Live at Stockholm Concert Hall the same year.

Brun featured as one of the guests on Peter Gabriel's 2011 studio album, New Blood, singing Kate Bush's part on the re-recorded version of "Don't Give Up". Later that year, she released her sixth studio album, It All Starts with One, produced by Tobias Fröberg.

On 11 March 2013, Brun performed her own adaptation of "Dido's Lament", from Dido and Aeneas by Henry Purcell, at Roundhouse in London. In May, she released a 32-track collection of songs from her first ten years in the music industry, entitled Songs 2003–2013, which included four new tracks. In October, she published a 20-track collection of covers and outtakes entitled Rarities.

=== 2015–2021 ===
In 2015, Brun released her seventh studio album, titled When I'm Free. This was followed in 2017 by Leave Me Breathless, a collection of covers of songs by diverse artists including Foreigner, Mariah Carey, and Radiohead.

In 2020, she issued two albums of original material in close succession. At first intended to be a double album, they were released separately as After the Great Storm in October and How Beauty Holds the Hand of Sorrow in November. Both received positive reviews and were nominated for IMPALA's European Independent Album of the Year Award. Brun won two awards at the 2021 Grammis, one for Composer of the Year and the other for Best Alternative Pop Album, for After the Great Storm.

=== 2022–present ===
In 2022, during the COVID-19 pandemic, Brun released Nærmere, a compilation album of career-spanning tracks re-recorded with Norwegian lyrics. In 2023, she collaborated with the Gothenburg Opera Dance Company's Kenneth Kvarnström on the production of 12 Pieces, a performance combining Brun's music with contemporary dance. That same year, she released the Rarities 2 collection and the covers compilation Portrayals. Alongside her solo work, Brun featured in Aurora's song "My Name" from her album What Happened to the Heart?, released on 7 June 2024.

== Personal life ==
Brun was diagnosed with lupus erythematosus at the age of 27, and a flareup in 2012 forced her to cancel a North American tour with Peter Gabriel.

Speaking of her choice to sing in English instead of her native Norwegian or Swedish, Brun has said that she finds it easier to craft lyrics and focus on the sound of words when writing in a non-native language, adding that she finds it harder to hear words objectively in her native language, and English allows her to explore her emotions and ideas more freely.

== Discography ==
- Spending Time with Morgan (2003)
- A Temporary Dive (2005)
- Duets (2005)
- Changing of the Seasons (2008)
- Sketches (2008)
- It All Starts with One (2011)
- When I'm Free (2015)
- Leave Me Breathless (2017)
- After the Great Storm (2020)
- How Beauty Holds the Hand of Sorrow (2020)
- I Thought We Were the Same (2026)

Awards
Preceded by Sissy Wish	Recipient of the best Female Pop Solo Artist Spellemannprisen; 2005	Succeeded by Marit Larsen
Preceded by Maria Mena	Recipient of the best Female Pop Solo Artist Spellemannprisen; 2011	Succeeded by No best Female Pop Solo Artist award
