= Massmedia =

- Origin: Sundsvall
- Years active: 1978
- Labels: Massproduktion

Massmedia was a classic punk band from Sundsvall, Sweden who recorded their first EP during Christmas 1978 at Torkhold, a bomb shelter at Västermalms gymnasium, which was also used for the early punk concert in Sundsvall.

In February 1979 they released their first album on their own label Massproduktion. It had a print run of 492 numbered copies and is now regarded as a collector's item.

Even before they released their first EP, they recorded the single "Das Jazz/Jag vill inget". It was recorded in the rehearsal room with Jan Zachrisson from Diestinct.

== Discography ==
- "Das Jazz", single, 1979
- "Massmedia", EP, 1979
- "Sista ackordet", LP, 1980
- "Ingen hets", EP, 1980

== Collections ==
- "Sundsvallspunk Vol. 1", 1979
- "Andra Bränder", 1981
- "Killed By 7 Inch", 1996
- "Vägra Raggarna Benzin - Punk Från Provinserna 78-82 Vol. I", 1998
- "Punksvall 1979-80", 2003
- "Svenska punkklassiker", 2003
- "Bloodstains Across Sweden No. 3", 1998
- "Bloodstains Across Sweden"
