= Lars Bygdén =

Swedish musician (born 1973)

- Born: 1973 (age 52–53)
- Origin: Sundsvall, Sweden
- Occupations: Singer, songwriter, guitarist
- Instrument: Guitar
- Label: Massproduktion

Lars Bygdén (born 1973) is a Swedish singer, song-writer and guitarist.

== Biography ==
Lars Bygdén was born 1973 in Sundsvall, Sweden. His musical career started as a guitarist in the psychedelic bands Magic Broom and The Shades of Orange. In 1996 Bygdén formed the country-rock combo The Thousand Dollar Playboys. The group released two critically acclaimed albums and got a lot of attention in Swedish media. The band dissolved in 2003. Lars Bygdén has continued as a solo artist on the record label Massproduktion and released his first solo album Trading Happiness for Songs in 2005 which won the Swedish Manifest award for best singer-songwriter album of the year. The album included the song This Road, a duet featuring Ane Brun (also featured on Brun's album Duets). In 2006 Lars did the theme song for the Swedish TV-show Grattis Världen!, a cover of Iggy Pop's The Passenger. In the spring of 2009 Bygdén released his second solo-album, the conceptual Family Feelings. In 2011 he summoned 15 years of songwriting on the double album Songs I Wrote and in 2012 came the critically acclaimed LB from which the animated video to The Hole was both Grammy- and Manifest-nominated.

== Discography ==
=== Albums with The Thousand Dollar Playboys ===
- 1999 The $1000 Playboys
- 2001 Stay

=== Solo albums ===
- 2005 Trading Happiness for Songs
- 2009 Family Feelings
- 2012 LB
- 2018 Dark Companion
- 2022 One Last Time for Love

=== Singles and EP's ===
- 2005 This Road EP
- 2005 Dream On
- 2006 The Passenger EP
- 2012 I Believe in You
- 2013 Maria
- 2013 The Hole
- 2018 We're Not About to Fall Apart

=== Compilation ===
- 2011 Songs I Wrote – double album
