= Fever in Winter, Shiver in June =

Fever In Winter, Shiver In June

EP by Syd Matters
- Released: 2002
- Genre: folktronica, indie folk, indie pop
- Label: Third Side Records
- Producer: Syd Matters

Fever In Winter, Shiver In June is the first EP published by French artist Syd Matters in 2002. It was released by Third Side Records. The French rock magazine Les Inrockuptibles helped with the promotion and publishing of the French artist's work, including this EP. The first track of the album, "Black & White Eyes", was aired in a live performance on national French television in 2004. The EP was also included in the 2008 re-release of "A Whisper and A Sigh" by Because Music.

== Track listing ==
All tracks are written by Syd Matters

No.	Title	Length
1.	"Black & White Eyes"	3:32
2.	"Connie"	2:38
3.	"Attractive"	6:54
4.	"Organised Life"	6:54
5.	"Silent Kenny"	3:01
6.	"In Your Town"	2:53
