= Changing of the Seasons (album) =

Studio album by Ane Brun
- Released: 12 March 2008 (Scandinavia); 14 October 2008 (US); 2 February 2009 (UK)
- Recorded: September–October 2007
- Genre: Contemporary folk
- Labels: DetErMine Records (Europe); Cheap Lullaby (US)
- Producer: Valgeir Sigurðsson

Ane Brun chronology
| Live in Scandinavia (2007) | Changing of the Seasons (2008) | Sketches (2008) |

Singles from Changing of the Seasons
- 1. "The Puzzle" Released: 17 January 2008; 2. "The Treehouse Song" Released: 4 March 2008 (Scandinavia) 12 January 2009 (UK); 3. "Big in Japan" Released: 14 September 2008 (Sweden only); 4. "True Colors" Released: 22 October 2008 (UK) 1 December 2008 (Sweden)

Professional ratings
Review scores
| Source | Rating |
|---|---|
| Allmusic | 3.5/5 stars |
| World of Music | 2.5/5 stars |
| The Guardian | 3/5 stars |
| musicOMH | 5/5 stars |
| Paste | 8/10 stars |
| Pitchfork Media | (5.2/10) |
| PopMatters | 7/10 stars |
| Slant Magazine | 3/5 stars |
| Spin | 8/10 stars |
| Uncut | 4/5 stars |

Changing of the Seasons is the fourth studio album by Norwegian singer-songwriter Ane Brun, released on 12 March 2008 in Norway and Sweden, 14 October 2008 in the US, and on 2 February 2009 in the UK. The album became her breakthrough record outside of Scandinavia when the bonus track "True Colors", a cover of the 1985 Cyndi Lauper song, was used in a television advertisement for Sky+ HD in the United Kingdom and Ireland. The other bonus track is a cover of Alphaville's 1984 hit single "Big in Japan", recorded as part of the soundtrack for the Swedish TV documentary programme Stor i Japan. The version of the album with the two bonus tracks was released in Europe on 7 December 2008 and in the UK in February 2009. The French release of the album on 12 October 2009 contained a third bonus track, a version in French of "Koop Island Blues", a song Brun originally recorded in 2006 with Swedish jazz group Koop.

The album debuted at No. 1 in Norway and at No. 2 in Sweden.

== Track listing ==
All tracks are written by Ane Brun, except where noted.

| No. | Title | Length |
|---|---|---|
| 1. | "The Treehouse Song" | 3:22 |
| 2. | "The Fall" | 3:41 |
| 3. | "The Puzzle" | 2:55 |
| 4. | "My Star" | 3:02 |
| 5. | "Ten Seconds" | 3:19 |
| 6. | "Changing of the Seasons" | 4:47 |
| 7. | "Lullaby for Grown-Ups" | 3:42 |
| 8. | "Raise My Head" | 3:05 |
| 9. | "Armour" | 3:50 |
| 10. | "Round Table Conference" | 3:39 |
| 11. | "Gillian" | 3:30 |
| 12. | "Don't Leave" | 4:04 |
| 13. | "Linger with Pleasure" | 2:52 |

=== Bonus tracks ===
| No. | Title | Writer(s) | Length |
|---|---|---|---|
| 14. | "True Colors" | Billy Steinberg, Tom Kelly, Cyndi Lauper | 2:20 |
| 15. | "Big in Japan" | Marian Gold, Bernhard Lloyd, Frank Mertens | 3:09 |

=== French bonus tracks ===
| No. | Title | Writer(s) | Length |
|---|---|---|---|
| 14. | "True Colors" | Billy Steinberg, Tom Kelly, Cyndi Lauper | 2:20 |
| 15. | "Big in Japan" | Marian Gold, Bernhard Lloyd, Frank Mertens | 3:09 |
| 16. | "Koop Island Blues (French Version) (Koop featuring Ane Brun)" | Ane Brun, Oscar Simonsson, Magnus Zingmark |

== Charts ==
=== Weekly charts ===
| Chart (2008) | Peak position |
|---|---|
| Dutch Albums (Album Top 100) | 48 |
| Norwegian Albums (VG-lista) | 1 |
| Swedish Albums (Sverigetopplistan) | 2 |

=== Year-end charts ===
| Chart (2008) | Position |
|---|---|
| Swedish Albums (Sverigetopplistan) | 99 |
