= Chords (musician) =

Swedish musician

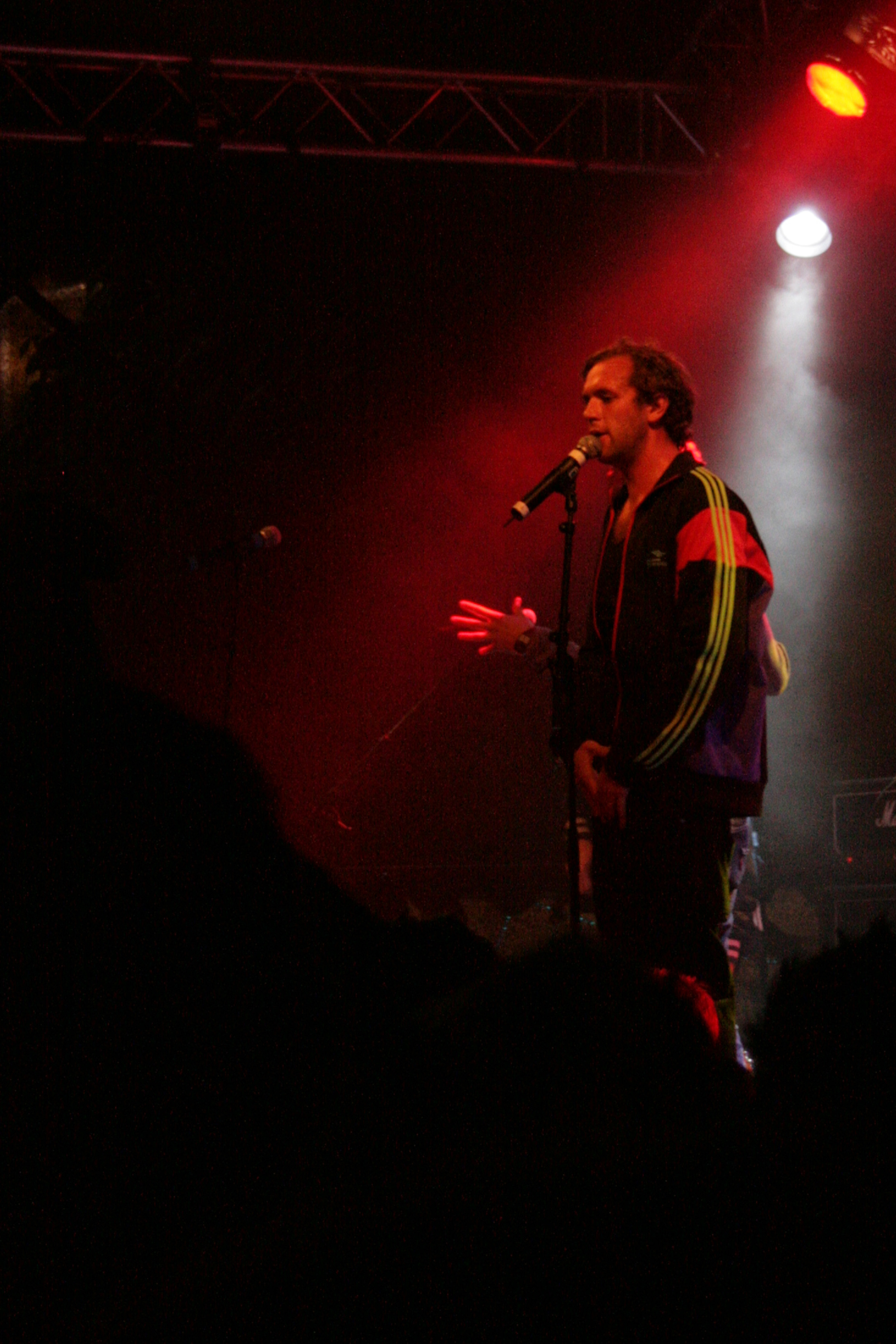
- Chords on Malmöfestivalen in 2008

Background information
- Born: Jens Eric Resch Thomason; 12 August 1978 (age 48)
- Origin: Lund, Sweden
- Genres: Alternative hip hop, reggae fusion
- Label: JuJu Records
- Website: http://www.chords.se/

Chords (or Jens Eric Resch Thomason; born 12 August 1978 in Lund) is a Swedish musician. He has his own studio and label called Svart Lax but was previously signed to Timbuktu's label JuJu Records, together with J-Ro of The Alkaholiks among others. The rapper/musician released his first single in 2001 and has since gained national fame in Sweden through his music, and most notably when his group Helt Off with Timbuktu made the title track for the Swedish film Babylonsjukan.

== Discography ==
=== Albums ===
- 2003: Chords - The Garden Around The Mansion
- 2004: Helt Off - Helt Off
- 2006: Helt Off - I Huset
- 2006: Chords - The Garden Around The Mansion (U.S. Release)
- 2007: Chords - Something To Chew On (Bootleg)
- 2008: Chords - Things We Do For Things
- 2012: Chords - Looped State Of Mind
- 2020: Chords - Poisson Noir_sans bars

=== Singles / EPs ===
- 2001: Chords & Scissors - "Urinall Disses"
- 2001: Smuts & Co. - "Lågbudget"
- 2002: Chords - "Idiot Savant"
- 2003: Chords feat. Timbuktu & Rantoboko - "Chillin' (Like Matt Dillon)"
- 2004: Chords - "Wrap Your Chops"
- 2006: Chords - "Get Off Mi Couch" (U.S. Release)
- 2008: Chords - "Appetite for Consumption" (feat. Timbuktu)
- 2012: Chords - "The Dude / Song for You"

=== Filmography ===
- 2004: Babylonsjukan
- 2005: Timbuktu - "Funken Styr Våra Steg" (DVD, 2005)
