= Nicolas Klotz =

French filmmaker (born 1954)

Nicolas Klotz (born 22 June 1954) is a French filmmaker born in Neuilly-sur-Seine, Hauts-de-Seine.

== Filmography ==
- Rendez-vous avec Marguerite 1983
- The Bengali Night 1988 with Hugh Grant, Shabana Azmi and Soumitra Chatterjee
- La Nuit sacrée 1993 with Goran Bregović
- Chants of Sand and Stars 1996
- Pariah (Paria) 2000
- The Wound (La Blessure) 2004
- Dans la peau de... Paulo Branco (2005) (TV)
- Heartbeat Detector (La Question humaine) 2007
- Low Life 2011
