= Spending Time with Morgan =

Studio album by Ane Brun
- Released: 25 May 2003
- Genre: Pop
- Length: 46:45
- Label: DetErMine Records / V2 Records
- Producer: Kim Nelson, Katharina Nuttall, Cecile Grudet

Ane Brun chronology
Spending Time with Morgan (2003)	A Temporary Dive (2005)

Spending Time with Morgan is the debut studio album by Norwegian singer-songwriter Ane Brun, released on 25 May 2003.

== Track listing ==
All tracks are written by Ane Brun.

No.	Title	Length
1.	"Humming One of Your Songs"	4:55
2.	"Are They Saying Goodbye?"	3:58
3.	"On Off"	4:35
4.	"I Shot My Heart"	3:57
5.	"Drowning in Those Eyes""	4:04
6.	"So You Did it Again"	1:53
7.	"One More Time"	4:04
8.	"Headphone Silence"	4:05
9.	"What I Want"	4:08
10.	"Sleeping by the Fyris River"	4:07
11.	"Wooden Body"	4:40
12.	"Humming One of Your Songs (Encore)"	2:19

== Personnel ==
- Ane Brun – vocals, acoustic guitar
- Katharina Nuttall – additional vocals and piano on track 5
- Thomas Dawidowski – double bass, electric bass
- Jonatan Fast – soprano saxophone on track 8
- Per-Ola Vallgren – drums and percussion, piano on tracks 1 & 12
- Andreas Rydman – pedal steel guitar and electric guitar on tracks 4 & 9
- Staffan Johansson – lap steel guitar on tracks 5 & 10
- Leo Svensson – cello on track 3
- Lisa Rydbert, Emma de Frumerie, Leo Svensson, Andreas Westerdahl – violin, viola, cello on tracks 1 & 12
