= Hannes Kilian =

German photographer

Hannes Kilian (13 November 1909 – 1 December 1999) was a German photographer.

== Life ==
Kilian was born in Bodman-Ludwigshafen, After attending grammar school (1921-1926) and the Spoersche Handelsschule (1926-1928) in Überlingen, Kilian trained as a photographer during a three-year apprenticeship in Kreuzlingen, Switzerland. He was then employed by the Grau photography company in Lucerne from 1931 to 1933. During the economic crisis, he lost his work permit for Switzerland and returned to Germany.

In view of the National Socialists' seizure of power, he emigrated to Naples. In 1936, he moved to Paris. With his work permit revoked, he returned to Stuttgart in 1938 and worked as a photojournalist. In 1941, he was drafted into the Wehrmacht as a war correspondent and deployed in the Russian campaign. After the end of the war, he worked again as a freelance photojournalist.

Kilian died in Wäschenbeuren at the age of 90. A part of his estate has been in the Haus der Geschichte Baden-Württemberg since 2001.

== Exhibitions ==
- 1974 "Stuttgart Ballett – John Cranko". Wanderausstellung des Instituts für Auslandsbeziehungen – zu sehen in 86 Ländern der Welt.
- 1975 "Stuttgarter Ballett". Ausstellung Forum für Kulturaustausch und Institut für Auslandsbeziehungen mit großer Multivision, 450 Farbaufnahmen und schwarzweiß Fotografien, konzipiert für die UdSSR
- 1978 "Dr. Günther Rennert". Fotoausstellung zu Ehren des verstorbenen Opernregisseurs im Staatsopernhaus Stuttgart
- 1982 "Carl Orff". Fotoausstellung im Staatsopernhaus Stuttgart zu Ehren des verstorbenen Komponisten
- 1994 "Die 50er Jahre". Ausstellung über die 50er Jahre in der Eingangshalle des Hauptbahnhofs Stuttgart
- 1995 "Die Zerstörung und Aufbau". Fotoausstellung zum Thema: 50 Jahre nach dem Zweiten Weltkrieg, 150 Großformatexponate im Hauptbahnhof Stuttgart
- 2004 "Bildergeschichten Hannes Kilian", Fotografien/Reportagen 1944–1974. Sonderausstellung im Haus der Geschichte Baden-Württemberg, Stuttgart
- 2007 "John Cranko zum 80. Geburtstag". Ausstellung zum 80. Geburtstag von John Cranko in der Staatsoper Stuttgart
- 2009 "Hannes Kilian Fotografien". Retrospektive anlässlich des 100. Geburtsjahres von Hannes Kilian im Martin-Gropius-Bau, Berlin. 356 schwarz/weiß Fotografien, ein Querschnitt der Arbeiten von 1934 bis 1987
- 2012 "Hannes Kilian. Im Wechselspiel des Lichts". Galerie Schlichtenmaier Stuttgart.
- 2012 "Hannes Kilian Fotografien" Retrospektive im Kunstgebäude Stuttgart.
- 2013 "Hannes Kilian Fotografien" Retrospektive im Museum Moderner Kunst Passau
- 2014 "Hannes Kilian" – Ausstellung im Goetheinstitut Paris.
- 2019 Hannes Kilian – Photographien von 1937 -1977, Johanna Breede PHOTOKUNST, Berlin

== Illustrated books by Hannes Kilian ==
- Ein Faß und etwas mehr. Hannes Kilian, text: Walther Wanka. Auftragsarbeit Fassfabrik Diener und Roth, Stuttgart 1940
- Alt Mexiko Alt Peru (Kunstmappe). Hannes Kilian, text: Hans Hildebrandt. published with the permission of the Publications Control Branch ICD OMG Württemberg/Baden, Eidos-Presse, Stuttgart 1948
- 75 Jahre Becker. Hannes Kilian, text: Walter Mundorff. Auftragsarbeit Brauerei Becker 1949
- Rhodos – Portrait einer Insel. Hannes Kilian, text: Arthur Kutscher and Käthe Brotze, Umschau Verlag, Frankfurt, 1959, 5th edition 1966
- Stuttgart. Hannes Kilian, text: Andreas Klaiber. Jan Thorbecke Verlag, Konstanz – Stuttgart 1961
- Menschen in Deutschland. Hannes Kilian, text: Senta Ulitz-Weber. Inter Nationes, Bad Godesberg, Ernst Battenberg Verlag, Stuttgart 1964 (translated in five languages)
- Harmonie der Bewegung. Hannes Kilian, text: John Cranko, Klaus Geitel u. a. Prestel Verlag, Munich 1968
- Internationales Ballett auf deutschen Bühnen. Hannes Kilian, Texte: John Cranko, Klaus Geitel among other Inter Nationes, Bad Godesberg, Prestel Verlag, Munich 1968
- Heimatbuch Rutesheim. Hannes Kilian among others, Gemeinde Rutesheim 1970
- Marcia Haydée – Porträt einer großen Tänzerin. Hannes Kilian, text: Heinz-Ludwig Schneiders, Horst Koegler among others Jan Thorbecke Verlag, Sigmaringen 1975
- Donzdorf – Heimatbuch 1976. Hannes Kilian. Stadt Donzdorf 1976
- John Cranko – Ballett für die Welt. Hannes Kilian, text: Klaus Geitel. Jan Thorbecke Verlag Sigmaringen 1977
- Ditzingen in Wort und Bild. Hannes Kilian, text: Wolfgang Irtenkauf, Adolf Schahl. Stadt Ditzingen 1979
- Stuttgarter Ballett. Hannes Kilian, text: Marcia Haydée, Walter Erich Schäfer among others Kunstverlag Weingarten, Weingarten 1980
- Der Freischütz – Opernaufführung. Hannes Kilian, text: Achim Freyer, Klaus-Peter Kehr. Ministerium für Wissenschaft und Kunst Baden-Württemberg, Druckhaus Münster, Stuttgart 1981
- Die Zerstörung – Stuttgart 1944 und danach. Hannes Kilian, text: Peter Lahnstein, Hans-Dietrich Nicolaisen. Quadriga-Verlag Severin, Berlin 1984
- Stuttgarter Ballett – Jubiläumsband »Romeo und Julia«. Hannes Kilian. Staatstheater Stuttgart 1992
- Kindheit in Stuttgart in den fünfziger Jahren. Hannes Kilian, text: Günther Willmann. Wartberg-Verlag, Gudensberg-Gleichen 1997
- Bildergeschichten Hannes Kilian – Fotografien/Reportagen 1944–1974. Hannes Kilian. Haus der Geschichte Baden-Württemberg, Katalog zur Ausstellung vom 17 December 2004 to 31 July 2005. 2004
- John Cranko zum 80. Geburtstag. Hannes Kilian, Gundel Kilian, Texte: Reid Anderson, Petra von Olschowski among others Staatstheater Stuttgart, Stuttgarter Ballett 2007
- Hannes Kilian. Katalog zur Ausstellung im Martin-Gropius-Bau Berlin: 04.04. – 29 June 2009, in Stuttgart: September 2010, Herausgeber Klaus Honnef. Buchhandelsausgabe: Hatje Cantz Verlag, Ostfildern 2009, ISBN 978-3-7757-2368-8
