= Aphelion (video game) =

2026 video game

- Developer: Don't Nod
- Publisher: Don't Nod
- Director: Florent Guillaume
- Producers: Dimitri Weideli; Victor Tallerico; Kelthoum Weiss
- Designers: Yoann Pignolé; Maxime Moze; Kati Bumbera
- Programmer: Aurélien Caussin
- Artists: Arnaud Barbier; Talal Selhami
- Writers: Hélène Henry; Leigh Alexander
- Composer: Amine Bouhafa
- Engine: Unreal Engine 5
- Platforms: PlayStation 5; Windows; Xbox Series X/S
- Release: 28 April 2026
- Genre: Action-adventure
- Mode: Single-player

Aphelion is an action-adventure video game developed and published by Don't Nod. Set in the 2060s, the game follows two astronauts who crash land on a frozen planet. Together, they must find a way to survive while being hunted by a mysterious entity. The game was released for PlayStation 5, Windows and Xbox Series X/S in April 2026. It received mixed reviews from critics and was a commercial disappointment for Don't Nod.

== Premise ==
Aphelion is a linear, third-person action-adventure video game with elements commonly found in stealth games. Set in the 2060s, Earth is becoming uninhabitable. The European Space Agency discovers a new planet known as Persephone. They enlist two astronauts, Ariane and Thomas, to scout Persephone to determine humanity's new hope. When a mysterious entity lifeform named the Nemesis hunts the pair, they must find a way to survive the uncharted planet. The game consisted at least 11 chapters. The two playable characters have distinctly different gameplay. Ariane is physically capable and her segments of the game are designed to be more action-oriented with a focus on traversal and platforming, while Thomas' segments focus more on survival and investigation.

== Development ==
The game was developed by Don't Nod, particularly the team that created Tell Me Why. It was also developed in collaboration with the European Space Agency. The planet Persephone was inspired by Planet Nine, and the team was influenced by science fiction movies such as Interstellar, The Martian, Ad Astra and Arrival. Unlike Jusant, a climbing game also developed by Don't Nod, traversal in the game was designed to be accessible for players. However, encounters with the Nemesis were designed to be challenging, with the team being inspired by the Alien franchise.

It was formally revealed during the Xbox Game Showcase in July 2025. The game was released on 28 April 2026 for PlayStation 5, Windows and Xbox Series X and Series S digitally, while the physical version is set to be released on July 2.

According to a financial report from Don't Nod, the production cost for the game was €8.5 million.

== Reception ==
Reception

Aggregate scores
Aggregator	Score
Metacritic	(PC) 64/100 (PS5) 64/100 (XSXS) 65/100
OpenCritic	33% recommend (Note: Based on 63 reviews)

Aphelion received "mixed or average" reviews from critics, according to review aggregator Metacritic. OpenCritic determined that 33% of critics recommended the game.
