= Meltdown (bar chain) =

French bar chain dedicated to video games and eSports

- Industry: bar
- Founded: May 1, 2012
- Founders: Sophia Metz; Manolack Sana Nikone; Yann-Cédric Mainguy
- Headquarters: Paris, France
- Services: Barcraft, Bar, Themed parties, Event management
- Website: www.meltdown.bar

Meltdown is a French bar chain dedicated to video games and eSports.

== History ==
Based on the idea of a permanent Barcraft, the first bar Meltdown was established in 2012 in Paris in a small bistro on rue Albert-Thomas. It streamed eSports competitions and had computers and consoles available for use by its clientele. The bar moved to a new location on Passage Thiéré, in the 11th arrondissement of Paris on December 21, 2013.

Meltdown is developing in France and abroad with a franchise platform. There are 20 bars in 7 countries.

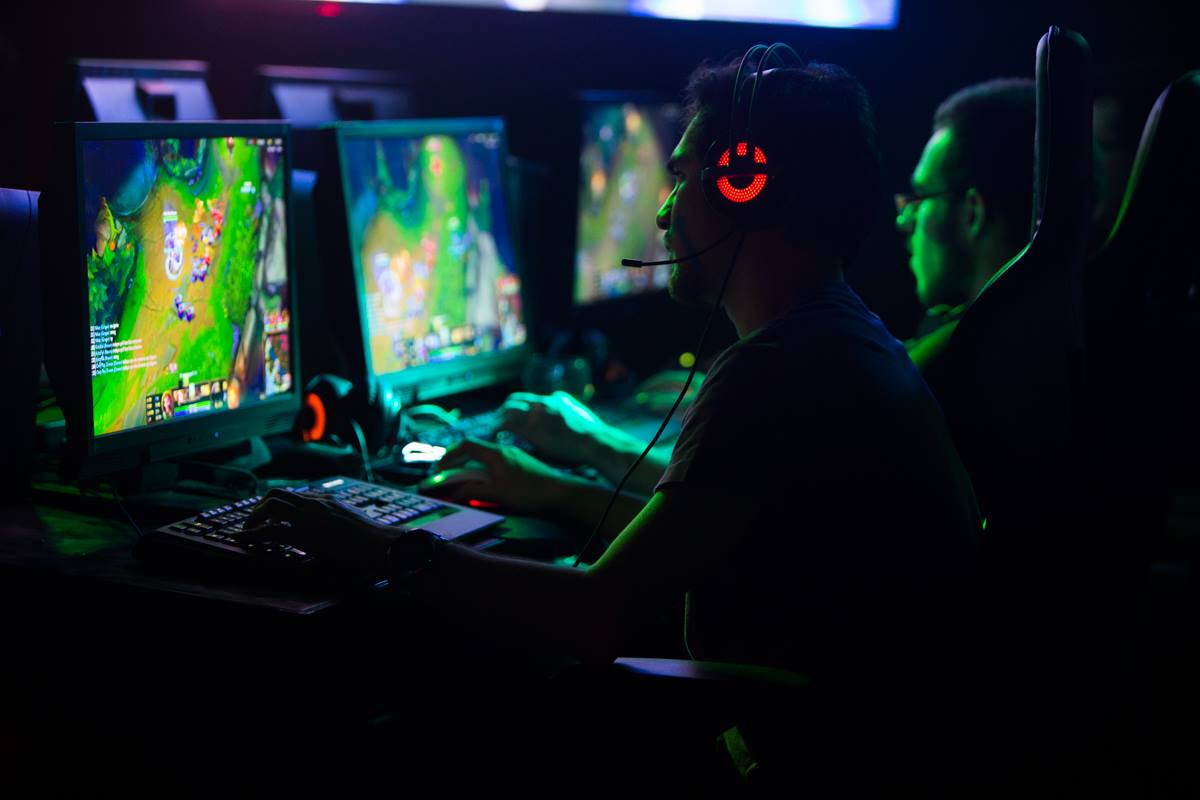
Meltdown Paris Competition League of Legends

== Model ==
Meltdown has a menu of cocktails inspired by the video game universe.

A schedule, varying depending on the city, highlights one specific game each day of the week, with the organisation of a free access tournament. Outside of tournament hours, computers and consoles are available for customers to play games.

Meltdown bars broadcast major eSports competitions on their screens. Meltdown has had a presence at gaming conventions such as Paris Games Week and Dreamhack.

=== Professional Players ===
A team of professional players was created by Meltdown in 2014. The first player to wear its colors was Olivier "Louffy" Hay, followed by Ilyes "Stephano" Satouri. The player Florent "Neo" Lecoanet, a world champion of Super Mario Kart, has since joined the team.

== Expansion ==
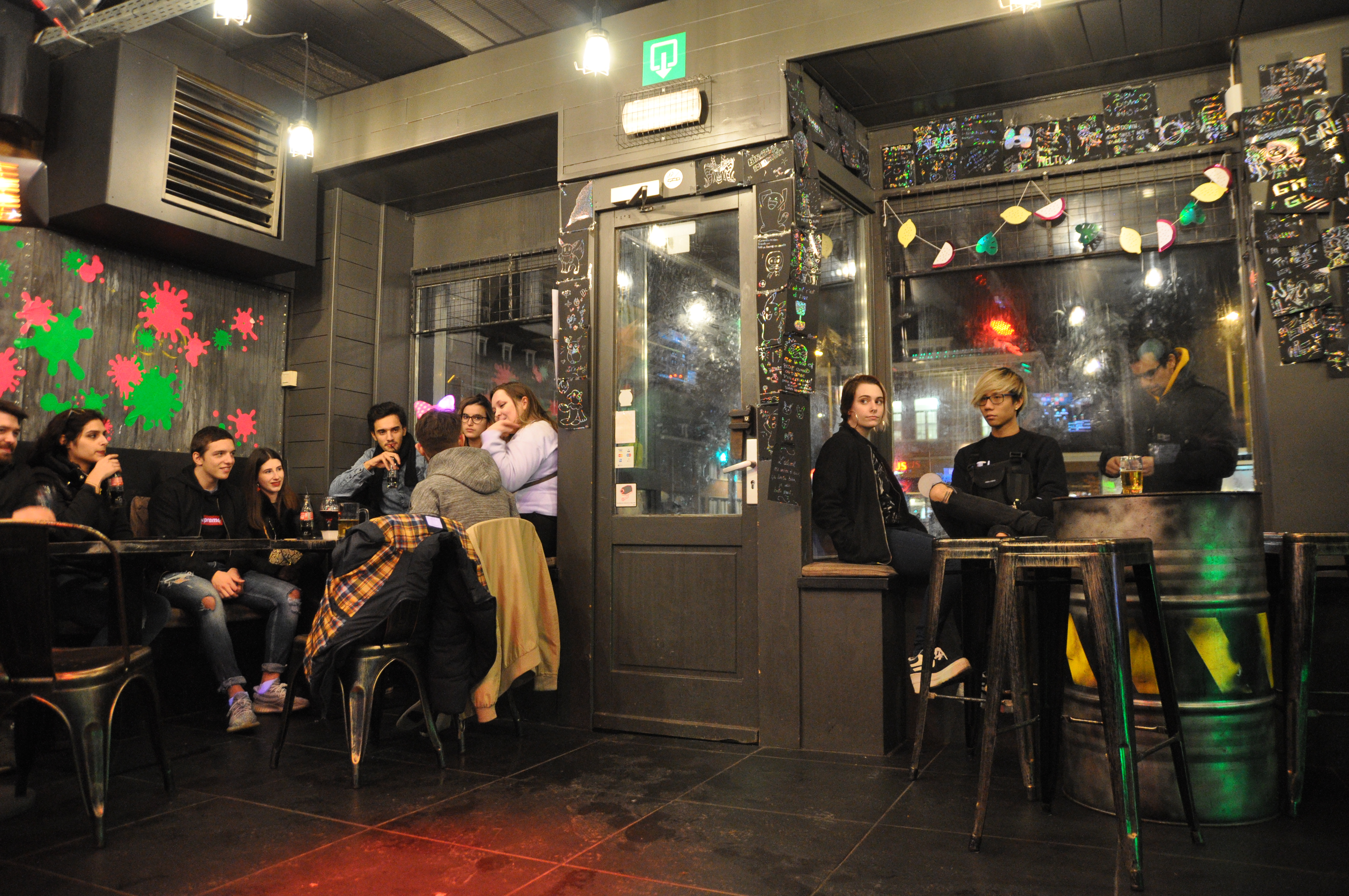
Meltdown Brussels

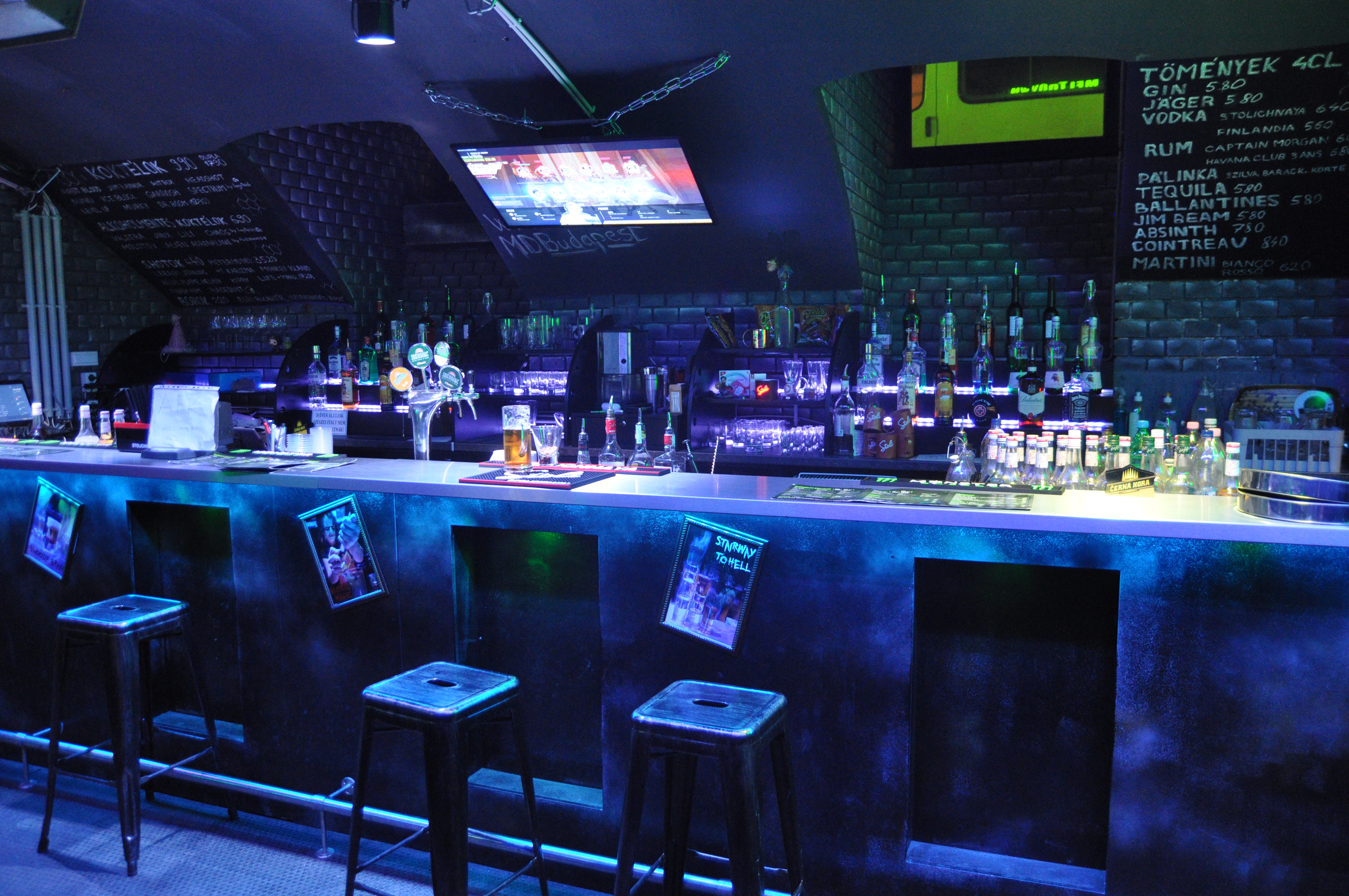
Meltdown Budapest

The creation of the Meltdown franchise was announced in March 2013. The bars currently open are:

- France:
  - Paris (opened on May 1, 2012 - new location as of December 21, 2013 - relocated September 19, 2020)
  - Montpellier (opened on July 12, 2014)
  - Strasbourg (opened on January 10, 2015)
  - Tours (opened on April 16, 2016)
  - Lyon (opened on April 30, 2016)
  - Troyes (opened on October 15, 2016)
  - Dijon (opened on April 29, 2017)
  - Marseille (opened on September 22, 2018)
  - Pau (opened on September 29, 2018)
  - Chambéry (opened on December 1, 2018)
  - Nantes (opened on January 19, 2019)
  - Avignon (opened on May 18, 2019)
  - Nancy (opened on October 26, 2019)
- Other countries:
  - London (United Kingdom, opened on June 1, 2013)
  - Cologne (Germany, opened on January 30, 2016)
  - Brussels (Belgium, opened on May 7, 2016)
  - Montreal (Canada, opened on July 30, 2016)
  - Madrid (Spain, opened on February 18, 2017)
  - Barcelona (Spain, opened on November 3, 2018)
  - Panama City (Panama, opened on December 14, 2018)
  - Málaga (Spain, opened on March 30, 2019)
  - Sheffield (United Kingdom, opened on May 11, 2019)
