= Gayming Magazine =

British LGBTQ online video gaming magazine

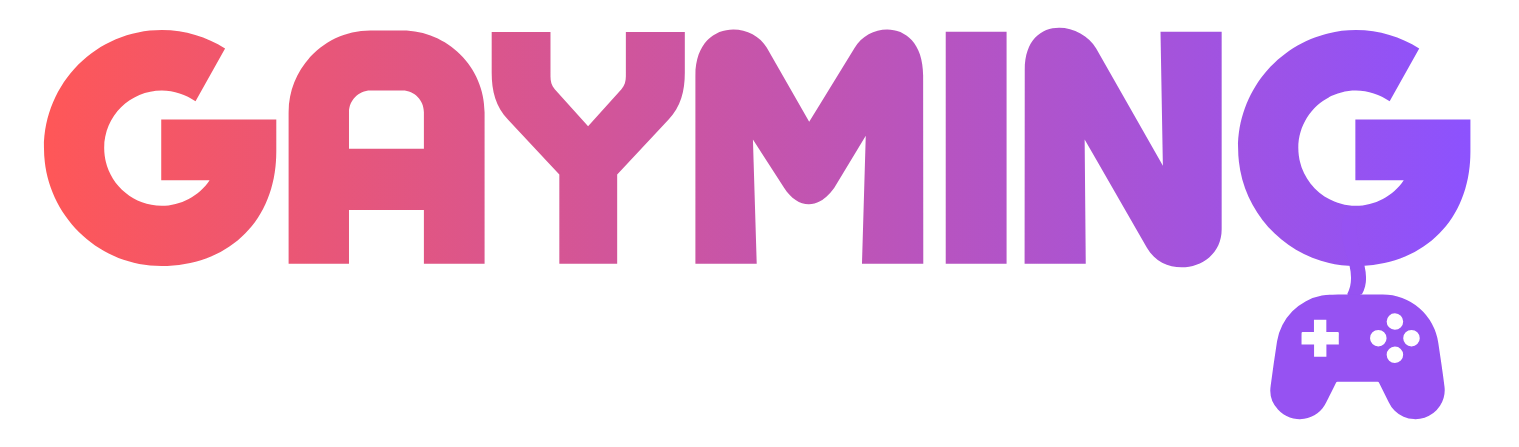
- Editor: Robin Gray
- Categories: Video games LGBTQ
- Publisher: Parrlime Productions Ltd
- Founder: Robin Gray
- Founded: 2019
- First issue: June 2019
- Country: United Kingdom
- Language: English
- Website: gaymingmag.com

Gayming Magazine is a British LGBTQ online video gaming magazine. The first video gaming website dedicated to the LGBTQ+ community, the site was launched in June 2019 with the aim of connecting the LGBTQ+ and video gaming communities, and has launched virtual pride events. In 2021, the magazine hosted the world's first LGBTQ+ gaming awards ceremony, Gayming Awards.

== History ==
Gayming Magazine was revealed at the London Games Festival in April 2019. According to founder Robin Gray, the LGBTQ+ community had been a niche of the video gaming community, and they wanted to celebrate that and bring the two communities closer together. The site was launched in June. In September, the site was nominated for a Women in Games Advocacy award. A live event, Gayming Live, was run between 30 September and 5 October, which featured LGBTQ+ gaming artists and journalists, and writers from Fusebox Games offered writing tips. Within its first year it was reported to have a readership of 17,000.

During Summer 2020, Gayming Magazine hosted DIGIPRIDE 2020, a digital pride event, emphasising the importance of getting through the COVID-19 pandemic and noting that normal pride events were being cancelled. DIGIPRIDE then became an annual staple for the next 4 years. The site was nominated for another Women in Games award in September 2020.

Gayming LIVE was an online convention concept launched in 2022 and held subsequently in 2023 and 2024. Each year saw a multi-day program of streamed events. The concept was retired in 2024 as a result in the downturn of the gaming economy and a withdrawal of key sponsorships.

== Gayming Awards ==
=== Gayming Awards 2021 ===
In July 2020, Gayming Magazine hosted the world's first LGBTQ+ gaming awards ceremony, Gayming Awards. Presented by Electronic Arts (EA), the awards were supported by The Association for UK Interactive Entertainment. The first ceremony was held virtually in February 2021 and hosted by Suzi Ruffell. The panel of judges consisted of more than twenty LGBTQ people, though the public voted on the Best LGBTQ+ Streamer and Gayming Magazine Readers’ Awards categories. Voting took place in November and December 2020, with all games released in 2020 being eligible.

The full list of winners of the Gayming Awards 2021 are as follows:

- Game of the Year: Hades
- Gayming Icon Award: Robert Yang
- Gayming Magazine Readers' Award: Hades
- Best LGBTQ Indie Game Award: If Found...
- Industry Diversity Award: I Need Diverse Games
- LGBTQ Streamer of the Year: DEERE
- Best LGBTQ Character Award: Tyler Ronan, Tell Me Why
- Authentic Representation Award: Tell Me Why
- Best LGBTQ Narrative Award: If Found...

The digital-only ceremony was watched by over 150,000 unique viewers around the world, making it the largest LGBTQ+ event on Twitch over the past year.

=== Gayming Awards 2022 ===
The Gayming Awards, presented by Twitch, returned in-person in April 2022, hosted by Julia Hardy. As before, the ceremony was live streamed on Twitch and IGN and was watched by over 320,000 people in 97 countries.

2022 saw a new LGBTQ+ Streamer Rising Star Award, as well as categories in comic books, esports and tabletop games.

The full list of winners of the Gayming Awards 2022 are as follows:

- Game of the Year: Life Is Strange: True Colors
- Gayming Icon Award: Tanya DePass
- Gayming Magazine Readers' Award: Resident Evil Village
- Best LGBTQ Indie Game Award: Unpacking
- Industry Diversity Award: Ukie's #RaiseTheGame pledge
- LGBTQ Streamer of the Year: Aimsey
- Best LGBTQ Character Award: Alex Chen, Life Is Strange: True Colors
- Authentic Representation Award: Life Is Strange: True Colors
- LGBTQ Streamer Rising Star Class of '22: It's Me Holly, cruuuunchy, CoderGirlChan, AwkwardishPanda, LuciaEverblack and Luke_Boogie
- Best LGBTQ Contribution to Esports: Emi "CaptainFluke" Donaldson
- LGBTQ Tabletop Game Award: Adventuring With Pride: Queer We Go Again
- Best LGBTQ Comic Book Moment: The Pride Omnibus – ComiXology / Dark Horse Comics

The 2022 Awards were also supported by CeX, Green Man Gaming, Bandai Namco, Space Ape Games, UKIE, German Games Industry Association, Out Making Games and London Games Festival.

=== Gayming Awards 2023 ===
The Gayming Awards, presented by Logitech G & Streamlabs, returned in 2023 in a pre-recorded format from New York City. The ceremony was broadcast on Twitch and IGN with over 525,000 watching live. The whole campaign reached over 1.5 million people and achieved press coverage in IGN, VentureBeat, Pocket Gamer and more.

The full list of winners of the Gayming Awards 2023 are as follows:

- Game of the Year: Cult of the Lamb
- Gayming Icon Award: Ashly Burch
- Gayming Magazine Readers' Award: Stray
- Best LGBTQ Indie Game Award: Wylde Flowers
- Industry Diversity Award: GLITCH
- LGBTQ Streamer of the Year: DragTrashly
- Best LGBTQ Character Award: Lor, New Tales from the Borderlands
- Authentic Representation Award: I Was a Teenage Exocolonist
- LGBTQ Streamer Rising Star Class of '23: BetweenTwoGays (Jayce & Ryan), Blobarella, itsOnlyVega, MadiDuVernay, Marisol Lords, TheJustRyan
- Best LGBTQ Contribution to Esports: XSET
- LGBTQ Tabletop Game Award: Adventuring with Pride – A Queero’s Journey
- Best LGBTQ Comic Book Moment: Young Men in Love – A Wave Blue World

The 2023 Awards were sponsored by Facebook Gaming, Devolver Digital, Rocksteady, Gilead Sciences, RedBull, Sumo Group, Twitch, Keywords Studios and TikTok.

=== Gayming Awards 2024 ===
The Gayming Awards returned in 2024 in a new pre-recorded virtual format broadcast on IGN as part of their Summer of Gaming, alongside live broadcasts on Twitch and TikTok.

The 2024 Awards saw a 200% increase in viewership with over 1.6 million people watching live or through TikTok clips. The whole campaign reached over 13 million people from around the world and achieved press coverage in IGN, VentureBeat, Forbes, Eurogamer and more.

The show was hosted by DEERE and MiladyConfetti, and produced by Nathan Noyes and Ian Devoglaer (The Boulet Brothers’ Dragula). In addition to the main broadcast, there was also a Spanish language co-stream on TikTok and a captioned stream on YouTube, both greatly increasing the accessibility of the Gayming Awards.

The full list of winners of the Gayming Awards 2024 are as follows:

- Game of the Year: Baldur's Gate 3
- Gayming Icon Award: Jeremy Crawford
- Gayming Magazine Readers' Award: Baldur's Gate 3
- Best LGBTQ Indie Game Award: Thirsty Suitors
- Industry Diversity Award: Latinx in Gaming
- LGBTQ Streamer of the Year: SpringSims
- Best LGBTQ Character Award: Shadowheart, Baldur's Gate 3
- Authentic Representation Award: Thirsty Suitors
- LGBTQ Streamer Rising Star Class of '24: DEVOGLAER, PearlTeese, SimplyAretha, Sinarynn & Sukar Baba
- Best LGBTQ Contribution to Esports: Emma 'Emzii' Rose
- LGBTQ Geek Entertainment Moment of the Year Award: The Last of Us: Long, Long Time

The 2024 Awards were sponsored by Devolver Digital, TikTok, Logitech, Humble Games and Zynga.

=== Gayming Awards 2025 ===
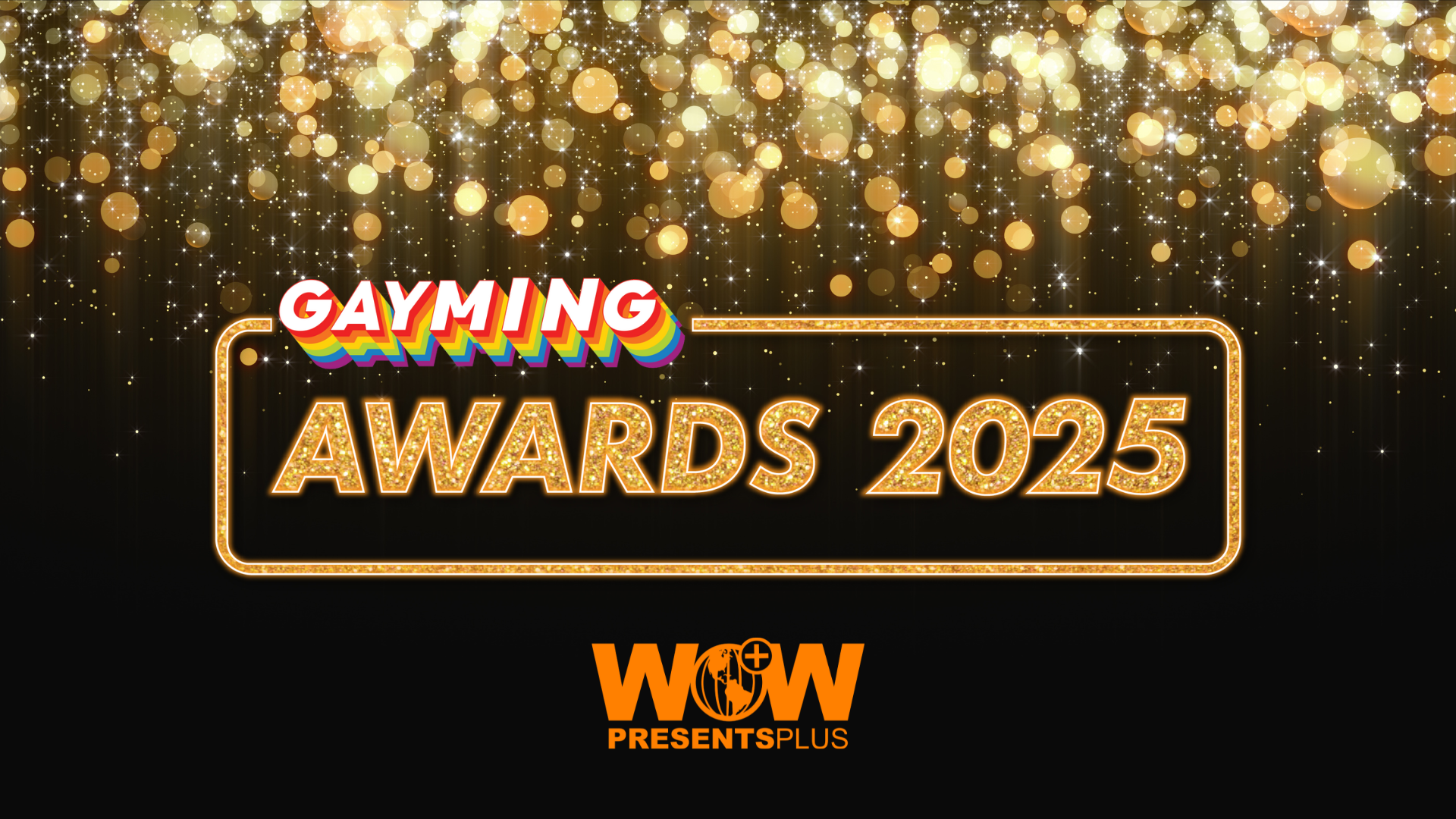
Gayming Awards 2025 logo

The Gayming Awards returned on July 8, 2025. The Awards were broadcast on the WOWPresentsPlus streaming service from World of Wonder, producers of the RuPaul's Drag Race franchise. Organizers claimed that this move to a global streaming platform is a big step in "establish[ing] the Gayming Awards as a key cultural moment".

Two new categories were added: LGBTQ+ Voice Actor of the Year and Community Impact Award. In addition, the LGBTQ+ Streamer of the Year category has been renamed as the LGBTQ+ Content Creator of the Year category to recognize the growth in non-live streaming content creators and their contributions to queer gaming. The launch of the 2025 Awards was the biggest one yet with major press coverage in outlets such as Pride.com, Yahoo Tech, Forbes, VentureBeat, Bleeding Cool, and Los Angeles Blade.

The list of winners of the Gayming Awards 2025 are as follows:

- Game of the Year: Dragon Age: The Veilguard (Bioware, EA)
- Best LGBTQ+ Indie Game Award: Kitsune Tails (Kitsune Games, MidBoss)
- Industry Diversity Award: Code Coven
- Community Impact Award: Stream for a Cause
- Gayming Magazine Readers' Award: The Last of Us Part 2: Remastered (Naughty Dog/PlayStation)
- Best LGBTQ+ Character Award: Rook – Dragon Age: The Veilguard
- Best LGBTQ+ Voice Actor of the Year Award: Erika Ishii
- LGBTQ+ Content Creator of the Year Award: PearlTeese
- LGBTQ+ Contribution to Esports Award: Bailey McCann
- LGBTQ+ Geek Entertainment of the Year Award: Arcane: Season 2 (Netflix)
- Gayming Icon Award: Rebecca Heineman
- LGBTQ+ Streaming Rising Star Class of 2025: BoyeFran, Bvssykatdoll, Mynxie666, and WillJinkies

=== Gayming Awards 2026 ===
The Gayming Awards returned on June 8, 2026, airing exclusively once again on World of Wonder's WOW Presents Plus. The 2026 Awards were hosted by voice actor Erika Ishii and RuPaul's Drag Race All Star Dawn. They were joined by guest stars Farrah Moan, Rock M Sakura, the Gaymer Guys (Evan Michael Lee & Chase Kolozsi), Alex Stompoly and Leslie Pirritano.

Two new content creator awards were added and with the two original creator awards, formed the new Gayming Awards Creator Honors segment, sponsored by Logitech G.

In advance of the show's broadcast, it was revealed that games and entertainment industry veteran Darion Lowenstein will be honored with the Gayming Icon Award, and drag legend Trixie Mattel will be presented with the new LGBTQ+ Content Creator Superstar Award.

The winners of the Gayming Awards 2026 are as follows:

- Game of the Year: South of Midnight (Compulsion Games / Xbox Game Studios)
- Gayming Fan Favorite Award: Date Everything! (Sassy Chap Games / Team17)
- Gayming Icon Award: Darion Lowenstein
- Best LGBTQ+ Character Award: Orela Rose, Dead by Daylight (Behaviour Interactive)
- Best LGBTQ+ Indie Game Award (sponsored by Dead by Daylight): Date Everything! (Sassy Chap Games / Team17)
- Community Impact Award: Qweerty Gamers
- LGBTQ+ Voice Actor of the Year Award: Jennifer English
- Industry Diversity Award: Riot Games
- LGBTQ+ Contribution to Esports Award (sponsored by Valencia Gay Games 2026): Team Liquid
- Queer Geek Entertainment Award (sponsored by Q Care Plus): Dimension 20: Dungeons & Drag Queens Season 2 (Dropout)
- Creator Honors (sponsored by Logitech G):
  - LGBTQ+ Content Creator Superstar: Trixie Mattel
  - LGBTQ+ Content Creator of the Year: ghCoffee
  - LGBTQ+ Breakout Content Creator: Will Jinkies
  - LGBTQ+ Streamer Rising Star Class of 2026: AceoftheDeadX, Artirie, Cyreelism & YouWorshipAngel

== See also ==
- Gaymer
