= Tyler Ronan =

Co-protagonist of the 2020 video game Tell Me Why

- First appearance: Tell Me Why (2020)
- Created by: Florent Guillaume
- Voiced by: August Aiden Black

In-universe information
- Alias: Ollie

Tyler Ronan is a fictional character and the co-protagonist of Tell Me Why, a three-part narrative video game developed by Dontnod Entertainment and published by Xbox Game Studios in 2020. Tell Me Why follows Tyler and his twin sister Alyson as they revisit their childhood home following a long separation. The game's narrative moves between the past and present, as the twins utilize their supernatural telepathic bond to explore memories of their past, some of it repressed, in an attempt to piece together the details of the tragic event that irrevocably impact both of their lives. Tyler Ronan is voiced by American actor August Aiden Black, who is a trans man like the character he portrays.

Tyler's status as the first transgender character to star in a AAA video game for a major developmental studio received significant media coverage prior to and after the release of Tell Me Why. The character's critical reception has been positive, with Black praised for his voice acting. At the 2021 Gayming Awards, Tyler was named Best LGBTQ Character, while Tell Me Why was conferred the Authentic Representation Award for its depiction of LGBTQ characters like Tyler.

== Development ==
=== Concept and creation ===
Tell Me Why was announced during Microsoft's Xbox London event on November 14, 2019, with Dontnod Entertainment revealing that one of its main characters is a transgender individual. The studio wanted to ensure that Tyler's experience is grounded in authenticity, not only shunning stereotypes and tropes about transgender people, but also that the character is not solely defined by his gender and trauma. Clay Carmouche, narrative director with Xbox Publishing, noted that stories which focus on marginalized characters are infrequently told, and that there is much scrutiny surrounding these stories as there is a "legacy of bad representation" which is prevalent in video game industry. In anticipation of mistrust or pessimism that the portrayals of characters like Tyler may be insincere or unempathetic, Carmouche pointed out that a frequently asked questions (FAQ) page is available on the official website of Tell Me Why to address such concerns as well as clarifying the direction of the narrative as determined by its developers.

According to game director Florent Guillaume, Tyler being a trans man resonates to the essence of Tell Me Why given the nature of its story and the themes it explores. Guillaume explained that the developers believed in the force of their story, and understand the risks as well as the responsibility it would mean to create a character who is believable and realistic. To him, authentic representation is crucial due to the fact that storytelling in video games often place players from the perspective of characters they may not necessarily relate to, which presents a "unique opportunity to drive empathy and share experiences”. Guillaume explains that Tell Me Why avoids a common trope in fictional works where minority characters are often painted in "broad strokes", and emphasized that while it is not possible for the developers to represent every transgender individual's experience within the constraints of the game's narrative, he hoped that players will be moved by Tyler's individual story. While Tell Me Why is the first AAA video game to feature a transgender character as its main character, Guillaume drew attention to the fact that many indie video games have featured LGBTQ+ themes or openly transgender characters, and he was hopeful that other major developmental studios do not hesitate to follow in their examples.

"When we see real characters in film, TV, games that are made with care that just show trans people as we actually are and not the stereotypes of the past, everyone who plays the game will have the opportunity to be a trans person, even in this tiny, little, small way, even in the context of a game."

— Nick Adams, 'Tell Me Why': Video game features transgender lead character

Dontnod consulted GLAAD, a non-governmental organization (NGO) originally founded to monitor potentially defamatory media coverage and depictions of LGBT people, for advice and input in the development of Tyler as an authentic transgender character. Guillaume credited GLAAD, particularly its director of transgender representation Nick Adams, for their assistance into script reviews and casting for Tyler, as well as its efforts in LGBTQ+ community outreach. Adams said that it is important that Tyler is a "realistic hero" and that Tell Me Why fosters an inclusive gaming experience, as "authentic media portrayals of trans characters can be a powerful tool for acceptance and understanding". Adams explained that it is critical that the real story of Tell Me Why does not place undue emphasis on the thoughts and opinions expressed by other characters towards Tyler's gender identity; instead, the goal is to strike "a balance between not ignoring Tyler’s ‘transness’, as if it doesn't affect his life, but not making it the central focus".

Players may decide during the course of the narrative as to whether Tyler develops a romantic relationship with Michael, Alyson's friend and colleague at the local café and convenience store in Delos Crossing. Carmouche noted that Adams wanted the writing team to explore Tyler's romantic side. The developers decided to approach the romantic dialogue between Tyler and Michael in a manner that players may experience the romantic content at their choosing, as opposed to defining Tyler with a specific sexual orientation. Tyler is occasionally referred to as "Ollie" during explorations of the character's pre-transition past: it is the first name or alias Tyler chose for himself.

=== Portrayal ===
August Aiden Black, who voiced Tyler, was described by Guillaume in an interview as more than the Tyler's voice actor as he was essentially "a vital member of the creative team.” Black acknowledged that Tyler is a personal role for him and that he drew from a lot of his own experiences during the development process, which influenced his portrayal of the character. Black described Tyler's "battle with acceptance in his personal relationships and community is something a lot of the LGBT+ community goes through", including himself, and that these experiences in turn shape how many transgender people approach life in reality. Black explained that Tyler's transgender identity is important as it "brings value to the story" of Tell Me Why, and that the game provides a highly visible platform to showcase a common shared life experience for transgender people which not many people are exposed to.

On Tyler's potential cultural significance, Black that he is "so much more than just a trans character", as his gender transitioning experiences is only part of a full fleshed out personality. Black suggested that as a member of a minority group, "having a video game character that might look like you is great", but it is more important that youthful players from that minority group could relate to characters who feel like they do, and provides "a connection they might not have anywhere else". Black is hopeful that characters like Tyler as presented in Tell Me Why will prove to be a watershed moment, and that more "characters meant to challenge the norms” will emerge in the future.

== Fictional biography ==
In Tell Me Why, Tyler reunites with his twin sister Alyson outside a youth detention center and revisit their childhood home in Delos Crossing. The twins were very close to each other as children due to their supernatural telepathic bond. After Alyson stabbed her mother Mary-Ann with a pair of scissors she used to cut her sibling's hair and inadvertently sent her plunging to her death from the side of their house's pier, Tyler insisted on taking the fall to protect her, and was subsequently sent to a juvenile detention center while Alyson is adopted by the incident's investigating officer, Delos police chief Eddy Brown. As a result of the incident, Tyler had long believed that Mary-Ann was transphobic and chased him with a double-barreled shotgun onto the pier after suffering a psychotic break.

Following Tyler's return to Delos Crossing, certain residents who knew him prior to his gender transition occasionally react in an offensive manner. For example, Mary-Ann's confidante Sam expresses astonishment that Tyler could look so much "like a man". As they explore the house and clear out Mary-Ann's bedroom, they discover a book of parenting advice on raising a transgender child, alongside a leaflet for a gay conversion camp. Both were given to Mary-Ann by her devout religious friend Tessa Vecchi, who runs a local café and convenience store with her husband, Tom Vecchi. From Tessa, Tyler learns that Mary-Ann came to her for advice about Tyler, but reacted angrily when Tessa suggested a camp who runs a conversion therapy program. The twins eventually discover that Tessa attempted to report Mary-Ann to child services for allegedly endangering her children through poor parenting.

Tyler steps away from Alyson following an argument about the circumstances surrounding their mother's death, but regroups with his sister when she discovers a hidden loft area located above the family barn. The twins solve the puzzles using the Book of Goblins and realize the "fairy-tales" Mary-Ann told them were actually metaphors for her troubled past. Deducing that Tessa's husband Tom may be their biological father, the twins summon him to the house, where they threaten to publicly expose his secret affair with Mary-Ann, which could threaten his candidacy as mayor of Delos Crossing. Tom claims that Mary-Ann was actually attempting to calm a scared Tyler, when Alyson intervened and stabbed her to defend Tyler. Tyler rejects this as a lie to keep Alyson silent, but she suspects this to be the true sequence of events due to inconsistencies in the twins' own memories. Tyler admits they may never know the truth, but asks Alyson to decide whether she believe that Mary-Ann planned to commit a double-murder and suicide, or that she had planned to kill only herself when she was interrupted by Tyler.

By the story's end six months later, Tom loses the mayoral election. Depending on the player's choices, Tyler may move to Juneau and potentially started a relationship with Michael, or becomes a ranger on Kodiak Island otherwise. His bond with his sister is also strengthened or weakened over the course of the narrative.

== Reception ==
Todd Martens from Los Angeles Times noted that Dontnod Entertainment's decision to cast Tyler as the transgender lead of Tell Me Why is "a rarity in all of mainstream entertainment but especially in video games". Given the context of an expansive Q&A released by the developers explaining how they intended to portray Tyler, Stacey Henley noted that the idea of using gendered pronouns with consideration for transgender rights is controversial and risked provoking a backlash from some quarters. Calling Dontnod Entertainment's decision "admirable" and "necessary", Henley said it is clear the developers see Tyler for more than his gender identity, and Tell Me Why will inevitably be defined by its boldness in breaking new ground. Henley expressed an interest to see how it translates into the final product in an article published by VG247 in February 2020.

The character was very well received following the release of Tell Me Why. Devin Randall from Instinct reported that Tyler received an enthusiastic feedback from players on social media. Henley praised Tyler Ronan as the "first truly well written transgender character" in video game history, who "comes with no strings attached" and pushes "queer representation in major video games into new territory". Henley described Tyler as "wonderful, so clearly shaped by his transness yet made of so much more than it", and noted that while his sister Alyson played her part, "Tyler steals the shows and gets all the best scenes", highlighting two conversations in Chapters Two and Three in particular, as well as his depiction as a confident person. In a later article published by TheGamer, Henley rated Tyler more favorably compared to Claire from Cyberpunk 2077, "both in terms of him as a person and the way his transness is explored". Describing Tyler as "complex, guarded and imaginative", E.L. Meszaros from CBR argued that he was the most important video game protagonist of 2020. M. Deitz from The Michigan Daily praised the game's decision to not deadname Tyler as part of its storytelling, instead presenting him as "all bearded out and confident in his masculinity".

The character gained accolades for his depiction in Tell Me Why. Tyler was named Best LGBTQ Character at the inaugural Gayming Awards, which was presented by EA Games and broadcast worldwide through streaming platform Twitch on February 24, 2021. Tell Me Why was also awarded the Authentic Representation Award for its depiction of LGBT characters. Tyler also received a nomination for "Best Character" by the Pégases Awards. Alongside Erica Lindbeck as Alyson, Black earned a co-nomination for "Outstanding Performance in a Drama, Lead" by the National Academy of Video Game Trade Reviewers' (NAVGTR) awards program honoring video game art, technology, and production in 2020.

=== Analysis ===
As part of their featured article about how Tell Me Why handles the issue of transgender representation through Tyler Ronan, GamesIndustry.biz interviewed a number of industry professionals who identify as transgender. Former games journalist Io Brindle said she was "pleasantly surprised" that Tyler experiences "remotely corresponds to trans people's actual experience". She appreciated how elements of his gender identity, life and history were presented simply as a story aspect which never dominates the wider plot or being designated as its "ultimate truth", and neither is it trivialized as "incidental cosmetic detail". She explained that similarly, gender transitioning is a vital experience for transgender individuals, but is never the only thing that matters in their lives.

Leon Killin from consultancy firm Balance Patch concurred with Brindle's view that Tyler's gender identity is successfully portrayed in a nuanced or realistic manner, and noted that there is sufficient "commonality" between his daily life and that of Tyler's depiction, which enriches the representation and made it feel authentic. He believed it would be difficult to further improve trans representation in the game without effectively rewriting Tyler as character. Crucially, Killin drew attention to the fact that Tyler is identified as transgender through the character's own words: players may encounter his "reminders to take testosterone shots and renew his prescription written on his wall calendar", or hear about "his self-directed discussions of binding and how he is considering chest surgery in the future". Killin pointed out that not all transgender experiences are uniform however, and said Tyler's seemingly ample access to a means of transition would suggest that transgender representation in Tell Me Why is "specifically for white, male-passing, trans men with a relatively smooth path by which to access their means of transition".

Deitz said the question of memory, a major theme in Tell Me Why, is "doubly important" for Tyler as a member of a sexual minority, because "the issue becomes not only trusting but identifying with the past versions of himself" and others in the LGBTQ+ community, exemplified by Tyler reliving moments in time prior to a self-awareness of his gender identity or sexual orientation, where he was once immersed in his “normal” experiences. Within this context, Deitz said Tyler constantly faces this dilemma as he is no longer the same person as the one from ten years ago, but to move on with his life, he must unearth the causes of what happened in the past.
