= Don't Nod =

French video game developer

Don't Nod Entertainment SA
- Trade name: Dontnod Entertainment (2008–2022)
- Type: Public
- Traded as: Euronext: ALDNE; Euronext Growth
- ISIN: FR0013331212
- Industry: Video games
- Founded: 1 May 2008; 18 years ago
- Founders: Hervé Bonin; Aleksi Briclot; Alain Damasio; Oskar Guilbert; Jean-Maxime Moris
- Headquarters: Paris, France
- Number of locations: 2 studios (2022)
- Key people: Oskar Guilbert (Chairman and CEO); Samuel Jacques (CCO)
- Revenue: ▲€13.95 million (2019)
- Net income: ▼€−0.09 million (2019)
- Owner: Tencent (42%); Kostadin Yanev (22%)
- Number of employees: 320 (2022)
- Website: dont-nod.com

Don't Nod Entertainment SA (formerly traded as Dontnod Entertainment) is a French video game developer and publisher based in Paris. Founded in June 2008, it started development on Remember Me (2013). Because of its poor return on investment, Don't Nod entered "judicial reorganisation" in 2013. With the help of French agency funding, it developed Life Is Strange (episodically in 2015), whose successful release raised Don't Nod's industry status. It began third-party publishing with Gerda: A Flame in Winter in 2022.

== History ==
=== Founding and debut title (2008–2013) ===
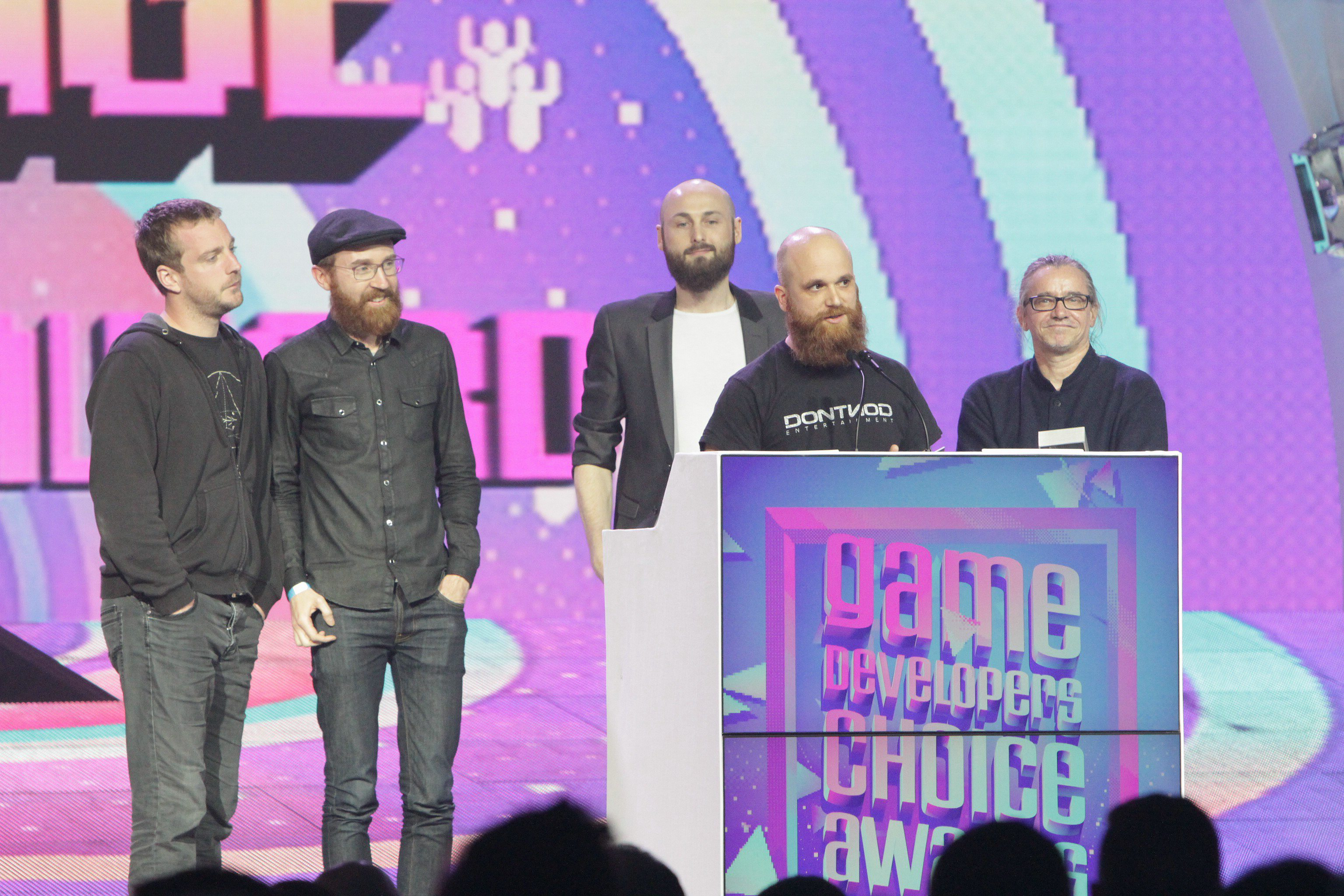
Dontnod developers receiving an award for Life Is Strange at the 2016 Game Developers Choice Awards, with directors Raoul Barbet and Michel Koch and producer Luc Baghadoust present

Dontnod Entertainment was founded by Hervé Bonin, Aleksi Briclot, Alain Damasio, Oskar Guilbert and Jean-Maxime Moris in May 2008, alongside other former Criterion Games, Ubisoft and Electronic Arts staff. "Dontnod" is a palindrome devised by Damasio. The company won a science competition of 30 000€ from the Ministry of Research with a fluid flow simulation. Founding investment partners were Kostadin and Mariana Yaneva (invested 20 000€), Douglas and Claudie Hawes, and Viktor Kalvachev. Originally based in Quartier des Quinze-Vingts in the 12th arrondissement, the studio moved into a new office in Quartier de la Villette in the 19th arrondissement to accommodate the company's growth at the time. The studio used Unreal Engine 3 for their first release, working with Epic Games' engineering team, and has since employed the engine for all of its games.

Dontnod's debut title was Remember Me, which would at first be a PlayStation 3-exclusive role-playing game, but was dropped by publisher Sony Interactive Entertainment in 2011 on account of cuts in funding. It was presented at Gamescom the same year to attract another publishing deal; the following year, Capcom Europe acquired the rights and reimagined it as an action-adventure game, released in June 2013. In 2013, Dontnod was the most subsidised studio with €600 000 aid by the French agency Centre national du cinéma et de l'image animée (CNC). Including aid for a new intellectual property (IP) project codenamed "What if?" (later Life Is Strange) for €200 000.

=== Reorganisation, Life Is Strange and Vampyr (2014–2018) ===
Don't Nod's logo until May 2022

On 28 January 2014, Dontnod filed for redressement judiciaire ("judicial reorganisation"), a form of receivership in France; the proceeding was finalised in February 2018. The proceeding filing was discovered by media outlet Factornews and some outlets like Polygon reported it as Dontnod filing for bankruptcy as a result of the poor sales of Remember Me. Dontnod responded to these reports explaining that they were in the process of "judicial reorganisation" to resize the company and denied bankruptcy.

In June 2014, Dontnod announced that they were working with Square Enix Europe on a new game, which was announced as Life Is Strange that year and released in 2015 over the course of five installments. The critical and commercial success of Life Is Strange caused Dontnod to be solicited by publishers, whereas they previously had to pursue publishers themselves. Guilbert said in April 2016 that the studio had cast off the ambition of making triple A games and would only see themselves devoted to independent projects, in particular, original, narrative-driven intellectual properties, which narrative director Stéphane Beauverger agreed was "part of Dontnod's DNA". Dontnod announced in July 2016 that it had entered into a partnership with Hesaw, a Parisian game studio in which Guilbert also held a management role, that saw the latter renamed Dontnod Eleven but remained an independent entity.

Vampyr, an action role-playing game announced in 2015, was released by Focus Home Interactive in June 2018. 70% of the studio's 120 employees (in 2016) were devoted to the development of Vampyr, many of whom had worked on Life Is Strange. Guilbert later stated that the company would pursue a co-production strategy with future publishers, as was done for Vampyr, limiting their part to forty per cent. The company's guiding principle was to reinvent itself with every game. For the sake of maintaining the motivation of players and publishers, the production cycle since releasing the five-year commitment Remember Me was reduced to two and a half or three years. Each project began with a designer, writer, and art director, with the occasional producer or engineer. "Dontnod Days" were maintained for unsupervised work related to ongoing projects.

=== Company floatation, Don't Nod Montréal, and third-party publishing (2018–2022) ===
In April 2018, Dontnod registered with the French stock market regulator Autorité des marchés financiers to become a public company. This came after a turnover of €9.7 million in 2017, a 33-per cent increase from the previous year. The subscription period opened on 3 May 2018, with the first day of trading on 23 May. Listed on Euronext Growth, Dontnod raised the intended €20.1 million. 25 per cent of the funds were spent on finding another studio to partner with; according to Guilbert, the rest would allow further project investment as well as improvement and optimisation of production pipelines, with an internal motion capture studio cited among possibilities. Despite Dontnod's public listing, Guilbert, together with investor Kostadin Yanev, intended to keep control over the company. Around this time, the company employed 166 staff members. The studio subsequently acquired Dontnod Eleven and absorbed its operations in June 2018. The Awesome Adventures of Captain Spirit, set within the Life Is Strange universe, released in June 2018. Dontnod started developing Life Is Strange 2 in early 2016, after its predecessor proved financially successful, and was released episodically between September 2018 and December 2019. In June 2019, Don't Nod acquired the publishing rights of its upcoming game Twin Mirror from Bandai Namco Entertainment and signed a 12 months-exclusivity agreement with the Epic Games Store for a better revenue split.

A subsidiary studio in Montreal, Canada, was announced in May 2020, adding to its more than 250 employees in France. Dontnod developed episodic adventure game Tell Me Why that was published by Xbox Game Studios between August and September 2020. In December, Dontnod published its first self-owned IP, Twin Mirror, which was co-developed with Shibuya Productions. In January 2021, Dontnod announced that Tencent had acquired a minority stake in the company for €30 million, granting the option to appoint a member to their board. The investment will allow Dontnod to continue self-publishing their titles and expand into China and the mobile game sector. Dontnod stated in April they plan to expand their self-publishing capabilities to third-party publishing as well, with the first planned title from Copenhagen-based studio PortaPlay. In September, Dontnod made their remote work policy "Fully Remote Organization scheme" permanent for all employees. In February 2022, Dontnod said that while Twin Mirror's timed exclusivity contract had been a significant revenue contribution in 2021; due to market saturation and the Chinese game approval freeze, it was expecting the game's ongoing revenue to be minimal and depreciated the remaining €4.4 million development expenses that financial year.

=== Rebranding, Lost Records, and missing sales expectations (2022–present) ===
On 31 May 2022, the company rebranded and changed its name to Don't Nod. Its third-party publishing side released its first game, PortaPlay's Gerda: A Flame in Winter in September 2022. At The Game Awards 2022, Don't Nod and Focus Entertainment revealed Banishers: Ghosts of New Eden, a spiritual successor to Vampyr. In February 2023, the company had a capital increase of €45.9 million, with Tencent as leading investor. Don't Nod released the visual novel game Harmony: The Fall of Reverie in June 2023. At the Xbox Games Showcase that same month, Don't Nod announced the puzzle platformer game Jusant which was released in October 2023. At The Game Awards 2023, Don't Nod revealed the narrative adventure game, Lost Records: Bloom & Rage, the first title developed by Don't Nod Montréal. Its development team included members of the original team that made the first Life Is Strange game, and was meant to kickstart its own universe. Banishers: Ghosts of New Eden was published by Focus Entertainment in February 2024. Benoît Gisbert Mora, deputy CEO, left Don't Nod in March 2024. In April 2024, Julie Chalmette, a former executive of Bethesda Softworks France and president of Syndicat des éditeurs de logiciels de loisirs, was appointment deputy CEO (Chalmette joined Don't Nod's board in May 2023). In September 2024, Don't Nod told investors that Jusant and Banishers did not meet sales expectations and that they are reworking future releases so they can appeal to a wider audience.

In January 2025, around 100 employees took part in a strike by Syndicat des travailleurs et travailleuses du jeu vidéo (STJV) against a redundancy plan. In February, an agreement with the union was reached. Lost Records: Bloom & Rage was released in two parts with the first releasing in February 2025 and the second in April 2025. Don't Nod's third-party publishing side released Koira, developed by the Brussels-based Studio Tolima, in April 2025, and The Lonesome Guild, developed by the Turin-based Tiny Bull Studios, in October 2025. In June, at the Xbox Games Showcase, the adventure game Aphelion was announced. That same month, Don't Nod laid off an undisclosed number of employees from the Montréal studio. In October, Don't Nod told investors that Lost Records: Bloom & Rage did not meet sales expectations. They also announced that a deal had been signed with Netflix to develop a narrative game based on "a major IP" at the Montréal studio, with Netflix set to publish the title. Aphelion was released in April 2026.

In June 2026, Don't Nod's auditor issued a report about the company's going concern; management had stated it would run out of funds by November 2026 according to its cash flow forecasts unless it succeeds in finding additional financing. In a statement to Game Developer, a spokesperson from Don't Nod confirmed they are seeking financial support for "Project P14" and working to "optimize its cost base". They stated that the reporting framework's disclosure does not account for the "various financing and cash preservation initiatives" being pursued. Gauthier Andres, known as Gautoz, reported on BlueSky that one of the alternatives is reducing "Project P14"'s scope to be able to release the game earlier than planned in 2027. In September 2026, Don't Nod announced that they had begun a "transformation initiative" at the main branch in Paris, potentially leading to layoffs that would affect 90 people. The studio reduced its output to a single project production line and has material uncertainty regarding the company's ability to continue as a going concern beyond 31 January 2027.

== Games developed ==
Year	Title	Platform(s)	Publisher(s)
2013	Remember Me	PlayStation 3, Windows, Xbox 360	Capcom
2015	Life Is Strange	Android, iOS, Linux, macOS, Nintendo Switch, PlayStation 3, PlayStation 4, Windows, Xbox 360, Xbox One	Square Enix
2018	Vampyr	Nintendo Switch, PlayStation 4, Windows, Xbox One	Focus Home Interactive
2018	The Awesome Adventures of Captain Spirit	PlayStation 4, Windows, Xbox One	Square Enix
2018–2019	Life Is Strange 2	Linux, macOS, Nintendo Switch, PlayStation 4, Windows, Xbox One	Square Enix
2020	Tell Me Why	Windows, Xbox One	Xbox Game Studios
2020	Twin Mirror	PlayStation 4, Windows, Xbox One	Dontnod Entertainment
2023	Harmony: The Fall of Reverie	Nintendo Switch, PlayStation 5, Windows, Xbox Series X/S	Don't Nod
2023	Jusant	PlayStation 5, Windows, Xbox Series X/S	Don't Nod
2024	Banishers: Ghosts of New Eden	PlayStation 5, Windows, Xbox Series X/S	Focus Entertainment
2025	Lost Records: Bloom & Rage	PlayStation 5, Windows, Xbox Series X/S	Don't Nod
2026	Aphelion	PlayStation 5, Windows, Xbox Series X/S	Don't Nod

== Games published ==
Year	Title	Platform(s)	Developer(s)
2022	Gerda: A Flame in Winter	Nintendo Switch, Windows	PortaPlay
2025	Koira	PlayStation 5, Windows	Studio Tolima
2025	The Lonesome Guild	PlayStation 5, Windows, Xbox Series X/S	Tiny Bull Studios
