= Vampyr (video game) =

2018 video game

- Developer: Dontnod Entertainment (Note: Switch version ported by Saber Interactive.)
- Publisher: Focus Home Interactive
- Director: Philippe Moreau
- Producers: Gladys Deussner; Maxime Clavier
- Designer: Guillaume Liechtele
- Programmer: Nicolas Sérouart
- Artist: Gregory Z. Szucs
- Writer: Stéphane Beauverger
- Composer: Olivier Deriviere
- Engine: Unreal Engine 4
- Platforms: PlayStation 4; Windows; Xbox One; Nintendo Switch
- Release: PlayStation 4, Windows & Xbox One; 5 June 2018; Nintendo Switch; 29 October 2019
- Genre: Action role-playing
- Mode: Single-player

Vampyr is an action role-playing video game developed by Dontnod Entertainment and published by Focus Home Interactive. It was released for PlayStation 4, Windows, and Xbox One on 5 June 2018, and for Nintendo Switch on 29 October 2019. The plot relates how Jonathan Reid, a doctor who has turned into a vampire, is torn between the Hippocratic Oath and his newfound bloodthirsty nature.

While some boss battles are mandatory, most combat can be avoided, and the player is under no obligation to kill innocents to finish the game. Dialogue options are used for conversation and hunting prey to feed on, which replenishes strength and levels up the lead character. Weapons and supernatural abilities are employed while combatting enemies. Set during the era of the Spanish flu, London serves as a fictionalised semi-open world composed of four districts, amenable to destruction based on the player's actions. The game was first mentioned at a Focus Home event in January 2015.

The developers researched the setting by travelling to London and consulting history books and documentaries. The visuals were made with fictional and factual reference points in mind. Olivier Deriviere composed the original score and infused it with industrial music. The game was met with mixed reviews from critics, who praised the primary game mechanic, setting, character development, and voice acting, but criticised the combat, overall narrative, technical problems, aspects of the choice-based system, and animations. The game surpassed one million copies sold within ten months.

== Gameplay ==
Vampyr is an action role-playing game played from a third-person view. The player controls Jonathan E. Reid, a doctor who was made into a vampire, and whose thirst for blood compels him to kill innocent people. To do this successfully, he must study and change his targets' habits, collect clues, and maintain relationships with the sixty citizens under his care in London, which serves as a fictionalised semi-open world built around hubs of neighbourhoods tethered to other areas. A skill tree facilitates the improvement of abilities, which is fuelled by experience points gained from blood and, alternatively, investigation. Feeding on human blood provides nourishment in addition to unlocking new vampiric powers. Abilities can be manually activated and passively upgraded. Active skills afford defensive, aggressive, healing, and tactical measures; passive skills increase health, stamina, the blood gauge and absorption, bite damage and regeneration, and carry capacity.

It is possible to finish the game without killing citizens, which best preserves Reid's cover as a doctor, but leaves him nearly incapable of levelling up. Killing no one unlocks one of four endings. He can turn people into vampires, and is only able to enter a house with an invitation. Locals each have their different backgrounds, relationships, and routines. If killed, they impart their last thought. The "Mesmerise" ability controls the behaviour of weaker targets, like coercing them into revealing information, or guiding them to less conspicuous areas so as to feed without combat. With crafted medicine, Reid can heal the injured and sick, who if eaten, will yield more experience points as a result; the rate of their affliction can be viewed using vampire senses, which also detect blood. Each of the four districts has a score based on the average health of its citizens. Reid navigates London using a waypoint, and collectible documents are scattered around the city.

Reid engages in combat with his enemies, using supernatural abilities.

Reid can wield improvised melee weapons, such as a saw, as well as ranged weapons including the Webley Revolver. Being able to use three-hit combos, dodge rolls, and parrying, he can fight against other vampires like him—aristocrats who go by the name of Ekon; sewer-dwelling vampires known as Skals; the Vulkod—a stronger breed of vampire resembling werewolves; Nemrod—vampires who hunt their own kind; and the Guard of Priwen—a secret society of vampire slayers. Boss fights are featured, and in some cases mandatory. Reid is adaptable to other vampire features, like the claws of a Vulkod. Weapon improvement through crafting is made possible by looting items. While using vampiric powers in combat, the character's blood bar drains. This forces him to feed so he can immediately replenish his strength. With the vitality attained from killing a human being, he can boil the blood of his enemies, cast blood spears, throw mist bombs, and turn invisible. He uses his control of shadows to hide himself and strike at his opponents. He can use "Spring" to scale locations and charge rapidly across gaps, which is also useful for avoiding combat.

== Plot ==
Doctor Jonathan Reid, returning to London from the Great War in 1918, awakes in a mass grave as a vampire. Overwhelmed with bloodlust, he inadvertently kills his sister Mary, who was searching for his body nearby. Jonathan takes shelter from vampire hunters in an abandoned house and starts hearing the disembodied voice of his maker, a typical feature in the progeny of vampires. Realising London is profuse with corpses, he follows a blood trail to a bar. The bartender points Jonathan to William Bishop, a suspicious patron. Bishop is caught feeding on a man named Sean Hampton and is killed by the vampire Lady Ashbury. Doctor Edgar Swansea rescues Hampton and hires Jonathan to practice medicine at Pembroke Hospital.

After the room of patient Harriet Jones is found covered in blood and Hampton disappears, Jonathan tracks him down for questioning. Hampton insists he did not murder Jones and directs him to an underground haven for corrupted vampires known as Skals, where it is revealed that Jones faked her death. Jonathan later discovers a corpse in the street bearing his mother's brooch. He pursues the perpetrator towards the cemetery in Whitechapel and finds his sister Mary with their mother Emelyne, realising Mary was turned into a vampire the night he fed on her. Mary is intent on killing him to rid herself of his voice, but dies trying. Jonathan vows to uncover what is behind the Skal epidemic, which he learns has been mistaken for the Spanish flu.

Lady Ashbury invites Jonathan to the West End on behalf of the Ascalon Club, a secret society of highborn vampires. By the order of its leader Lord Redgrave, Jonathan roots out the source of Skals in the district. Swansea is later kidnapped and, once located, admits to attempting to heal Jones with Lady Ashbury's blood, thereby creating the Skal epidemic; once Ashbury finds out, she flees in shame. It is made known that the entity Myrddin Wyllt, claimant to the role of Jonathan's maker, sired him to defeat his mother Morrigan, also known as the "Red Queen", after she possessed Jones to wreak havoc upon London. Jonathan defeats Morrigan in battle, resolving then to travel after Lady Ashbury to her family castle, where she hid with her maker William Marshal, 1st Earl of Pembroke. Now a ravenous vampire, Marshal explains to Jonathan that when he fought the previous Disaster that caused the Black Plague (and the Great Fire of London that was caused by him), he succumbed to the blood of hate and hurt Ashbury. After discovering a cure for it and using it on Ashbury, he chose to live in his castle to hold back his dark thirst and as an atonement. Marshal then asks Ashbury to end his life, which she complies.

The ending then differs on the amount of civilians that were embraced, with Jonathan's eyes either gradually changing to red with or remaining human: If Jonathan embraced less than five civilians, Jonathan will succeed in talking Ashbury out of killing herself and vows to find a cure for the blood of hate, with the two either traveling across the world and visiting the United States or locking themselves up in Ashbury's Estate with Old Bridget standing guard for them. Myrddin will be proud of Jonathan and either wish him peace or luck on his new quest. If Jonathan embraced between five and nine civilians, Ashbury will incinerate herself; if Jonathan embraced more than ten civilians, he will declare his love for her and will never get over Ashbury's death, but otherwise won't be affected by her death and will become a monster with no sympathy for humanity that kills indiscriminately. Myrddin will then express pity towards Jonathan for having lost his way or disapproval over his fallen champion.

== Development ==
Development began with a team of sixty people, later expanded to around eighty, many of whom worked on Dontnod Entertainment's previous project Life Is Strange. The game was co-funded and co-produced with publisher Focus Home Interactive. The project was first revealed in January 2015 at a Focus Home event. For a short time, the developer considered setting the game in 1950s United States, but after narrative director Stéphane Beauverger joined the project, it was discarded to inspire a more gothic mood with focus on the 1918 Spanish flu pandemic, set in London. The paintings of Phil Hale influenced the art style, also for the purpose of atmosphere. Dontnod researched the setting by visiting London and taking photographs, but since the city had been largely rebuilt, history books and documentaries concerning Whitechapel, the London Docks, and the Isle of Dogs were also consulted. The literary sources Liquid History: The Thames Through Time and The Book of Facial Expressions: Babies to Teens provided geographical and anthropological insight, respectively, while the television series Casualty 1900s and The Knick were turned to for medical information. Anthony Howell was hired to voice Jonathan Reid. The characters and dialogue were scripted by two French writers and translated into English by two native speakers. Dontnod decided on the British accent, though the marketing department wanted more variety in the accents featured. The period was studied using both factual and fictional reference points (Note: As such, the game world has been described as a uchronia.) to create the visuals, realised with photorealistic lighting, and post-processes running on the Unreal Engine 4. Motion capture was used to track character movement. In August 2016, the major obstacles in developing the Xbox One version had been overcome with the assurance that there would be no downgrades despite its hardware disadvantages. The game has one save slot, a decision Dontnod made for in-game choices to have "real, meaningful impact"; to avoid corrupted saves, they implemented backup systems.

Adhering to either Reid's Hippocratic Oath or vampiric nature intends to explore the dualism of his survival as both a doctor and vampire. Olivier Deriviere served as the composer throughout development, infusing the score with industrial music to portray the solitude and inner struggle of the main character. Eric-Maria Couturier played the cello, whose sounds were intended to go from "emotional" to "bestial". The bass flute, piano, double bass, and cimbalom (chosen for how it reflected that period in London) were also employed, each characterising an aspect of the story. Deriviere saw the choir as representing an oppressive influence on the main character, and thought its combination with industrial music was effective given the amount of post-processing. The soundtrack was released on 3 May 2018 on Bandcamp, and launched on all digital platforms the day the game came out. Vampyr was released to manufacturing in May 2018.

== Release ==
The game was officially announced by Focus Home Interactive at E3 2015. After a technical issue delayed it from its original November 2017 launch date, Vampyr was rescheduled for Q1/Q2 2018. The final episode of a making-of video series revealed that it would be released on 5 June (for PlayStation 4, Windows, and Xbox One). Those who pre-ordered the game gained access to bonus downloadable content called "The Hunters Heirlooms", which contained exclusive in-game cosmetics. If pre-ordered through select retailers in Europe and Australia, a phonograph record of the soundtrack was included.

A launch trailer came out the following month, leading up to the release. Two new difficulties, Story and Hard mode, launched on 26 September 2018. Vampyr was added to Xbox Game Pass, a subscription-based service for Xbox One games, on 28 March 2019. A Nintendo Switch version developed by Saber Interactive was released on 29 October 2019.

In October 2021, an update that improved performance and allowed the game to run at 60 frames per second on the PlayStation 5 and Xbox Series X/S was released for the PlayStation 4 and Xbox One versions of the game.

== Reception ==
Reception

Aggregate score
Aggregator	Score
Metacritic	(PC) 72/100 (PS4) 70/100 (XONE) 70/100 (NS) 69/100

Review scores
Publication	Score
Destructoid	6/10
Electronic Gaming Monthly	8/10
GameRevolution	2.5/5
GameSpot	7/10
GamesRadar+	3.5/5
IGN	7/10
PC Gamer (US)	68/100
VideoGamer.com	7/10

Vampyr received "mixed or average reviews", according to review aggregator Metacritic. Destructoid's Kevin Mersereau enjoyed the dialogue conversations, atmosphere, and character development. Emma Schaefer of EGM declared Reid's dualism between doctor and vampire the title's greatest strength, while also praising the character development for imbuing "even the lowest beggar" with some importance. Matt Utley at Game Revolution enjoyed the atmosphere, each district's distinct look, and aspects of the combat. Writing for GameSpot, Justin Clark was impressed with the effect of decisions and how this tied into the core gameplay, calling it "empowering". He also commended the "enthralling" characterisations, "exquisite" setting, and "captivating" voice acting. GamesRadar+'s Leon Hurley, like Schaefer, found the mechanic of testing Reid's morality compelling, calling the characters well-realised and integral. Also approved of was the "atmospheric victorian London setting". Brandin Tyrrel, writing for IGN, termed Vampyr "a fresh and genuine take" on vampire mythology. He was generally satisfied with how choices turned out and said the recreation of London as a "gloomy, somber city" was bolstered by authentic characters, whose writing and performances he also enjoyed. Tyrrel welcomed the story and enjoyed the citizen mechanics, something Andy Kelly at PC Gamer also appreciated, hoping that more video games would follow suit. He called the dialogue-driven storytelling "compelling" and the setting "atmospheric". Alice Bell of VideoGamer.com wrote, "Vampyr serves delicious ladles of angst and drama with a hearty slice of excellent, morally grey choice system that will genuinely surprise you, all wrapped up in a wonderfully gloomy London".

Conversely, Mersereau scolded the overall narrative for its "threadbare" contribution. He called the combat "a low-grade Witcher knockoff", complaining about its lack of precision and "sloppy" mechanics. Lengthy loading screens and constant hangs were also cited as a source of annoyance. Schaefer lambasted the animations for being "a little wonky" and the unpolished nature of the game. To Utley, Vampyr failed to impress, in particular its character development and impact of choice. He also had technical problems (low resolution, "choppy" performance, and lengthy loading times). Already frustrated with the combat, Clark said frame rate drops and frequent loading screens worsened the experience. He found that the narrative became weaker in the final chapters. Hurley viewed the combat as "functional at best"; "solid if uninventive", and chastised how small decisions led to big mistakes, which he felt forfeited responsibility for one's actions. Tyrrel cited lip syncing as a primary concern of the animation, criticised the lack of variety in combat, and experienced the same technical difficulties as Mersereau, Utley, and Clark, albeit noting that they amounted to minor annoyances. Kelly disliked the "dull, repetitive" combat sequences and, despite noting a variety of fighting styles, saw this ultimately as a "tiresome" distraction. Agreeing with many others on the combat, Bell described it as continuously turning "sour".

=== Sales and accolades ===
Focus Home Interactive stated that Vampyr would be considered successful if it sold one million copies, although half would turn a profit. It debuted in the United Kingdom, Germany, and France as the best-selling video game across all formats, reaching second place on the Italian chart (behind FIFA 18). Vampyr sold 450,000 copies after one month of release, contributing to an increase of over twenty percent of its publisher's revenue for the first quarter of 2018. That October, the publisher cited Vampyr as a key factor in its second quarter's €44.3 million revenue. By April 2019, Vampyr had sold one million copies; these sales contributed to a 22.1% rise in revenue for Dontnod, equivalent to a €10.5 million increase from the previous fiscal year.

At E3 2017, Vampyr received one of GamesRadar+'s Best of E3 awards and was nominated for GamesBeat's Unreal Underdog award and Game Critics Awards' Best RPG award. It was later nominated for the Best Console Game, Best Screenplay, and Best Soundtrack awards at the 2018 Ping Awards, and for "Best Role-Playing Game" at the Titanium Awards, and won the "Game, Original Role Playing" award at the NAVGTR Awards, whereas its other nominations were for the "Original Dramatic Score, New IP" and "Use of Sound, New IP" awards.

== Legacy ==
In August 2018, it was announced that the television production company Fox 21 Television Studios had optioned Vampyr as a series, with Wonderland Sound and Vision and DJ2 Entertainment also attached to the project. McG, founder of Wonderland Sound and Vision, directed and served as executive producer with Mary Viola, Corey Marsh, Dmitri Johnson, and Stephan Bugaj.

Dontnod Entertainment and Focus Home Interactive have announced to have renewed their partnership for a new game in April 2019, with Dontnod stating Vampyr is a "great success". It was revealed to be Banishers: Ghosts of New Eden in 2022.
