= Paris Games Week =

Annual video game trade fair in Paris, France

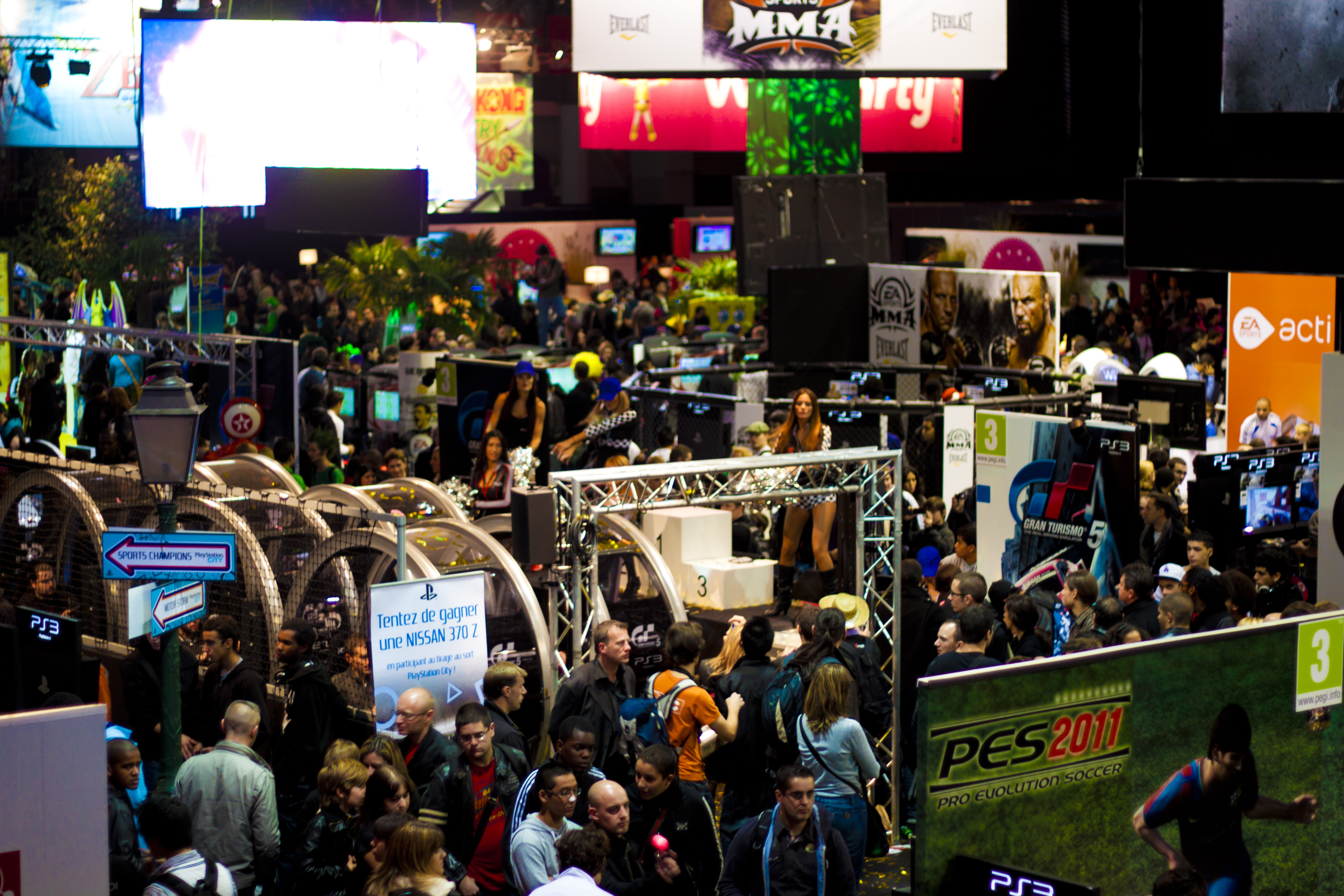
- Status: Active
- Genre: Video games
- Venue: Paris expo Porte de Versailles
- Location: Paris
- Coordinates: 48.830°N 2.286°E
- Country: France
- Inaugurated: 27 October 2010; 16 years ago
- Most recent: 23 October 2024; 2 years ago
- Next event: 30 October 2025; 12 months ago
- Attendance: 317,000 (2019)
- Organizer: SELL
- Website: www.parisgamesweek.com/en

Paris Games Week, or simply PGW, is a trade fair for video games held annually at the Paris Expo Porte de Versailles in Paris, France. It is organised by SELL (Syndicat des éditeurs de logiciels de loisirs), a French organisation that promotes the interests of video game developers.

With 317,000 visitors for the 2019 edition, the show is the second most popular trade show in Europe and one of the world's most visited video game trade shows, ahead of E3 in the United States (66 100 visitors in 2019) and the Tokyo Game Show in Japan (262,076 visitors in 2019), but behind Gamescom in Germany (373,000 visitors in 2019) and the Taipei Game Show in Taiwan (over 320,000 visitors in 2019).

== Dates ==
Year	Dates	Venue	Location	Attendance
2010	27–31 October	Paris Expo Porte de Versailles	Paris	120,000
2011	21–25 October	Paris Expo Porte de Versailles	Paris	180,000
2012	31 October–4 November	Paris Expo Porte de Versailles	Paris	212,000
2013	30 October–3 November	Paris Expo Porte de Versailles	Paris	245,000
2014	29 October–2 November	Paris Expo Porte de Versailles	Paris	272,000
2015	28 October–1 November	Paris Expo Porte de Versailles	Paris	307,000
2016	27–31 October	Paris Expo Porte de Versailles	Paris	310,000
2017	1–5 November	Paris Expo Porte de Versailles	Paris	304,000
2018	26–30 October	Paris Expo Porte de Versailles	Paris	316,000
2019	30 October–3 November	Paris Expo Porte de Versailles	Paris	317,000
2022	2–6 November	Paris Expo Porte de Versailles	Paris	
2023	1–5 November	Paris Expo Porte de Versailles	Paris	
2024	23–27 October	Paris Expo Porte de Versailles	Paris	
2025	30 October-2 November	Paris Expo Porte de Versailles	Paris	
2026	22-25 October	Paris Expo Porte de Versailles	Paris	
