= Banishers: Ghosts of New Eden =

- Developer: Don't Nod
- Publisher: Focus Entertainment
- Director: Philippe Moreau
- Producers: Karim Benfares; Augustin Dagoret; Thomas Roux
- Designers: Guillaume Liechtele; Camille Lallement; Elise Galmard
- Programmer: Nicolas Sérouart
- Artist: Benoit Godde
- Writers: Stéphane Beauverger; Devin Doyle
- Composer: Trevor Morris
- Engine: Unreal Engine 5
- Platforms: PlayStation 5; Windows; Xbox Series X/S
- Release: 13 February 2024
- Genre: Action role-playing
- Mode: Single-player

Banishers: Ghosts of New Eden is a 2024 action role-playing game developed by Don't Nod and published by Focus Entertainment. The game was released for PlayStation 5, Windows, and Xbox Series X/S on 13 February 2024. Upon release, it received generally positive reviews from critics, but was a commercial disappointment for Don't Nod.

== Gameplay ==
Banishers: Ghosts of New Eden is a third-person action role-playing game. In the game, the player assumes control of a pair of ghost hunters named Antea Duarte and Red mac Raith. The pair goes on a mission to investigate a small but haunted community named New Eden, though Duarte becomes a ghost in the process. Players can make use of both Raith's conventional weaponry and Duarte's spirit abilities to combat hostile enemies. In the game, players will have to make numerous choices, influencing the game's story.

== Plot ==
The story is set in 1695 and revolves around two banishers (itinerant warrior mystics who banish hauntings), Ruaidhrigh "Red" mac Raith, a former soldier from Scotland and his mentor-lover Antea Duarte, a Cuban-born mystic and scholar. The pair arrive in the New English settlement of New Eden, being invited by their friend Reverend Charles Davenport. The town is plagued by a malevolent spirit, and Davenport, having impatiently confronted the spirit, dies of a heart attack.

The protagonists meet Charles' widow, Esther, as well as the selectmen of the town: the governor and self-avowed demonologist Fairefax Haskell; the leader of the militia, Captain Saul Pennington; and the gruff and taciturn huntress "Thickskin" Newsmith. During their first night's stay, unable to find Antea, a panicked Ruaidhrigh rushes to the town's meetinghouse to confront the spirit. The creature is revealed to be an extremely powerful ghost, called a Nightmare, who summarily kills Antea and hurls Red down into the cliffs below.

Red later wakes up in a deserted beachside cave, tended by a young woman who calls herself "Seeker" and reveals that her mistress, a witch called Siridean, has ordered her to tend to him. Shortly afterwards, Red encounters the haunting spirit of Antea, with whom he commits to return to the town of New Eden to recover Antea's body. The game's direction is decided here: the pair can commit to resurrecting Antea through a necromantic ritual called Lesser Palingenesis, which requires a sizable sacrifice of people, or they can simply allow Antea to peacefully ascend to her afterlife.

Throughout the game, the protagonists encounter the various characters from the prologue following the colony's flight from New Eden and learn about their various degrees of complicity in the trial and execution of a young woman called Deborah Comenius: Captain Pennington, who has led his followers to the snowy mining town of Mount Pleasant, originally levelled the accusation of witchcraft against Deborah for what he perceived as corrupting his mild mannered daughter Grace by introducing her to reading and research; Governor Fairefax, who resettled in the agrarian community in the Harrows, had officiated the trial and execution despite having dabbled with the occult himself; Kate Newsmith, sister to Thickskin, was Deborah's secret lover but she could not come to her defence out of fear. As a result, Deborah's haunted spirit evolved into a pervasive force that permeates the entire colonial peninsula.

Several minor storylines consist of Thickskin "culling" dependent colonists by exposing them to wolf packs by giving them whistles that summons wolves on them under the guise of calling for help; Governor Haskell's son Lamentation unwittingly causing a grieving husband being possessed by the spirits of his brother and his wife; a racist hunter and his black rival; a wealthy colonist refusing to emancipate her slave with whom she's fallen in love and the ghost of an elderly colonist who tries to repent her denunciation of Deborah by traveling back in time to deter her past self from accusing the young teacher; a French spy who sabotaged the New Eden harbour and her attempts to fake her own death to start a new life; a repentant petty criminal who impersonates the husband of a domestically abused villager whom the couple had done away with; a young hunter who cannibalised his best friend to stave off starvation; and war hero who suffers from the guilt of killing his comrade by friendly fire.

Dependent on the choices the players make, including an intermediate sequence where they can decide to follow through their original choice to resurrect or allow Antea to pass on, the ultimate confrontation can result in one of five endings:

- Red successfully resurrects Antea, deeply traumatising them both after having accused innocents to harvest them for the ritual. They remain together but it's hinted that they are on a darker quest for knowledge.
- Red fulfils his oath to let Antea ascend, taking her body away for burial. He later starts a family and trains new generations of banishers.
- To remain with her for longer, Red tries to renege on his oath to Antea but then relents. Antea ascends while a grieving Red sails to Cuba to inform Antea's family of her passing.
- Red reneges on his oath to Antea's ascension, and Nightmare returns. Seeker tries to intervene on their behalf, but Nightmare magically ages her. It is revealed that she is the younger version of Siridean the witch (Scottish Gaelic for "little seeker"), and they are all trapped in a time loop.
- Red fails the resurrection ritual, and Nightmare returns. Seeker tries to intervene on their behalf, but Nightmare magically ages her, and it's revealed that she is the younger version of Siridean the witch, and they are all trapped in a time loop.

== Development and release ==
In 2019, Focus Entertainment and Don't Nod Entertainment launched a new development deal after the success of Vampyr, and commenced the co-production. It is a "spiritual successor" to Vampyr. Banishers: Ghosts of New Eden was revealed during The Game Awards in December 2022. The game was originally scheduled to release for PlayStation 5, Windows, and Xbox Series X/S on 7 November 2023. On 26 September, it was delayed to 13 February 2024 in order to avoid an "intense" release window.

The game was added to PlayStation Plus Extra in July 2025, which coincided with an update improving performance and visuals on PlayStation 5 Pro.

== Reception ==
=== Critical reception ===
Reception

Aggregate scores
Aggregator	Score
Metacritic	PS5: 78/100; Win: 78/100; XSXS: 81/100
OpenCritic	79% recommend

Review scores
Publication	Score
Eurogamer	4/5
GameSpot	7/10
IGN	7/10
PC Gamer (US)	74/100
PCGamesN	8/10
Push Square	8/10
Shacknews	7/10
TechRadar	4/5

Banishers: Ghosts of New Eden received "generally favorable" reviews from critics, according to review aggregator website Metacritic. OpenCritic determined that 79% of critics recommended the game.

At the 2025 Pégases Awards, Banishers was nominated for the award for outstanding Narrative Excellence.

=== Sales ===
In September 2024, Don't Nod said that the sales of Banishers: Ghosts of New Eden had performed well below their expectations.
