= Harmony: The Fall of Reverie =

2023 video game

- Developer: Don't Nod
- Publisher: Don't Nod
- Producers: Cyrille Combes; Saïda Mirzoeva Cler
- Designers: Maxime Moze; Stéphane Bura
- Programmer: Trung Nguyen
- Artists: Amaury Balandier; Florent Auguy
- Writer: Matthias Fuchs
- Composer: Lena Raine
- Engine: Unreal Engine 5
- Platforms: Nintendo Switch; Windows; PlayStation 5; Xbox Series X/S
- Release: Nintendo Switch, Windows; 8 June 2023; PlayStation 5, Xbox Series X/S; 22 June 2023
- Genres: Adventure, visual novel
- Mode: Single-player

Harmony: The Fall of Reverie is a narrative adventure game by Don't Nod. It was released for Nintendo Switch and Windows on 8 June 2023 and for PlayStation 5 and Xbox Series X/S on 22 June.

== Gameplay ==
The player takes control of the protagonist, Polly, who has returned to her hometown of Atina after receiving news of her mother's disappearance. The player has to make decisions at certain points in the story. To do this, the player visits the Augural, a tree with nodes representing different choices. Depending on the player's decision, the story takes a different turn and locks other nodes, leading to one of several endings.

== Plot ==
After several years abroad, Polly returns to her hometown of Atina. Her mother has disappeared under mysterious circumstances. She finds a strange amulet in the remains of her mother, which suddenly throws her into a parallel world: Reverie. Here live wondrous, godlike beings called "aspirations," which symbolize human characteristics and attitudes. She learns that she has the gift of clairvoyance. Polly needs to see into the future and stop an apocalypse that threatens the balance between her world and the deities'.

== Development and release ==
The game was developed and published by Don't Nod. The game's voice actors include Shala Nyx, Jennifer English, Jacqui Bardelang, Timothy Watson, Rachel Atkins, Roly Botha, Abigail Thorn, Helen Aluko, Ramon Tikaram, Karl Queensborough, and Natalie Gumede.

Harmony: The Fall of Reverie was announced during Nintendo Direct on 9 February 2023. A demo was available on Steam during LudoNarraCon from 4 to 8 May. On 4 May, the release date on 8 June 2023 for Microsoft Windows and Nintendo Switch and for PlayStation 5 and Xbox Series X/S on 22 June was announced.

== Reception ==
Reception

Aggregate score
Aggregator	Score
Metacritic	PC: 75/100; NS: 71/100; XSX: 77/100

Review scores
Publication	Score
4Players	76/100
Eurogamer	4/5
Hardcore Gamer	4/5
IGN	8/10
Shacknews	9/10
The Guardian	2/5

Harmony: The Fall of Reverie received "generally favorable" reviews, according to Metacritic.

While enjoying the non-linearity of Harmony's narrative, NintendoWorldReport criticized the frequent and lengthy loading screens, "Sometimes this means you will enter an area, there will be one dialogue box, and it will move to another area which prompts yet another loading screen". The Guardian disliked how the player could see into the future, feeling it robbed the narrative of surprise, "being able to see what will happen next sucks the suspense out of the whole thing". Eurogamer praised how by adding clairvoyance, the title bridged some of the dissonance between the player and who they controlled, "With that in mind, Harmony feels like an examination of the entire genre's limits... lifting the veil to show us the ending from the very beginning, and challenging us to forge our own path to that goal".
