= Sophia Metz =

Entrepreneur (born 1986)

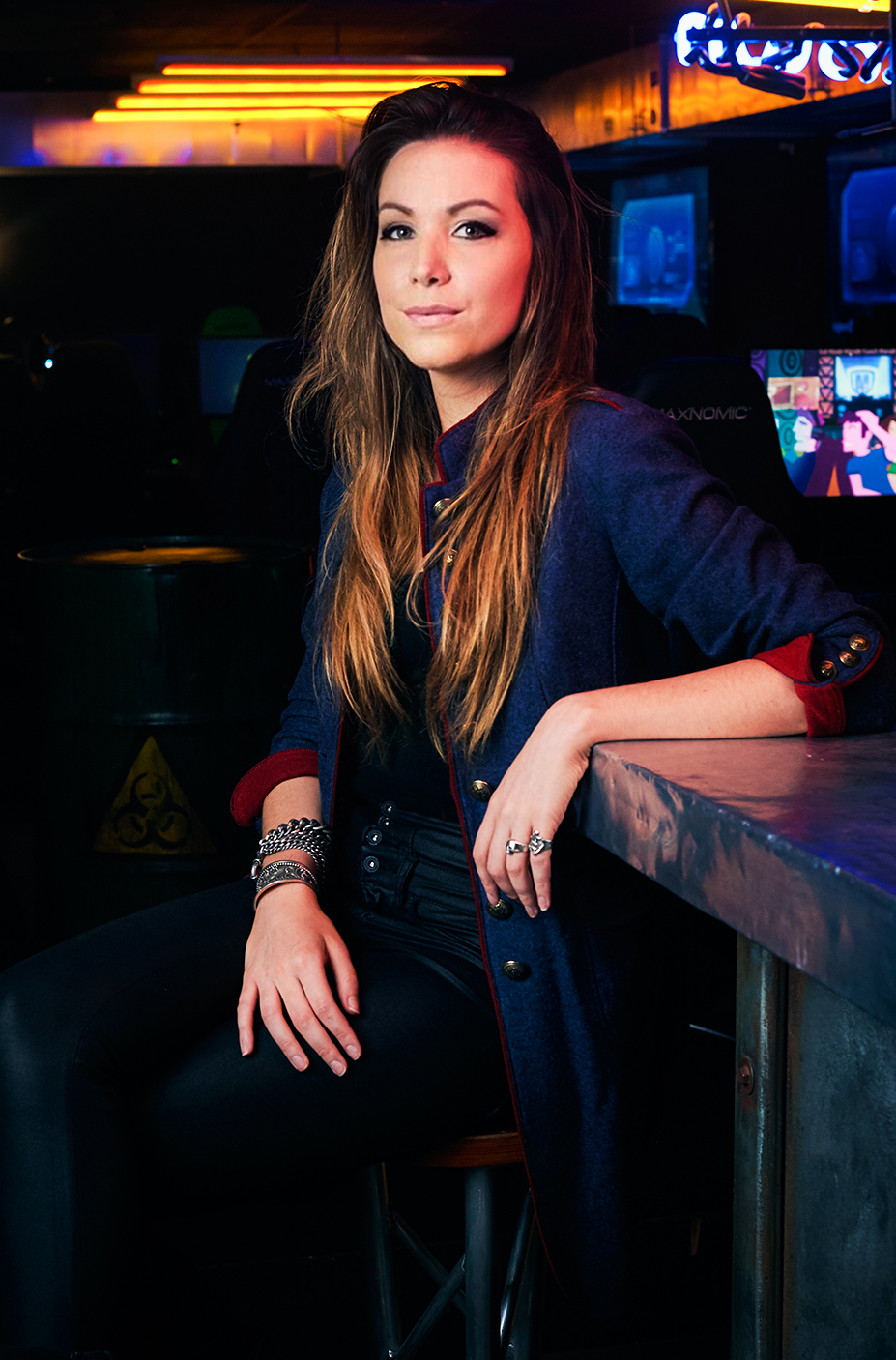
- Born: 1986 (age 39–40); France
- Occupations: Entrepreneur, technology advocate
- Known for: Meltdown, Biostream

Sophia Metz (born 1986) is a French entrepreneur and technology advocate. She is a co-founder of Meltdown and defense-technology company Biostream.

== Biography ==
Sophia Metz, born in France in 1986, grew up in a gaming-enthusiast family. As a teenager, she developed coding skills and co-founded Barcraft Europe with friends, enabling bars to stream esports. For a brief period, she has also worked as a music photographer and advertiser.

Metz is the co-founder of an esports bar chain, named Meltdown. In 2012, she opened a bar in Paris's République district, and due to its success, expanded to Berlin and London in 2013. The demand for similar establishments led to the Meltdown's franchising, starting in Montpellier. In 2019, there were twenty-three Meltdown bars in cities such as Dijon, Nantes, Marseille, Toulouse, and Nancy.

In 2019, Sophia Metz partnered with Mikkey Dee to launch Alabama, a rock-themed bar.

Later, she started Biostream, a company developing wearable technologies that use AI-based sensor fusion to detect medical emergencies in real time. The system analyses physiological and contextual signals in combat environments and transmits alerts with the casualty's location to help medics organise and prioritise evacuation. The development of such systems has been discussed in the context of the Russo-Ukrainian war, where artillery, mines and drone strikes produce large numbers of blast injuries requiring rapid triage.

Metz has been described as active in advocating Western investment in Ukrainian defense innovation.

== Awards and recognition ==
- 2018: BFM Business Award

== Bibliography ==
- Epic Lanes (2018)
