= Achoura =

2018 horror film

- Promotional release poster by Aleksi Briclot
- Directed by: Talal Selhami
- Written by: Jawad Lahlou; Talal Selhami; David Villemin
- Produced by: Lamia Chraibi; Talal Selhami
- Starring: Younes Bouab; Sofiia Manousha; Iván González; Moussa Maaskri; Omar Lofti
- Cinematography: Mathieu de Montgrand
- Music by: Romain Paillot
- Release date: December 2018 (PIFFF)
- Running time: 90 minutes
- Countries: Morocco; France
- Languages: French, Arabic

Achoura is a 2018 Moroccan-French horror fantasy film directed and co-written by Talal Selhami. Moroccan actors Omar Lotfi and Younes Bouab star alongside Sofia Manousha, Ivan Gonzalez, Mohamed Choubi, and Moussa Masskri. The film's plot follows four childhood friends who reconnect when one of them, who disappeared 25 years prior during the Ashura holiday, re-enters their lives, leading them to confront a monstrous djinn. The film is regarded as the first Moroccan fantasy film.

Described as the first monster movie shot in Morocco, Achoura premiered in December 2018 at the Paris International Fantastic Film Festival. The film met success at the Tangier National Film Festival where it won the award for best production, and at the Film Festival of Marrakech. The film also won the grand prize at the Hard Line Festival in Germany in October 2018.

== Cast ==
- Younes Bouab
- Sofiia Manousha
- Iván González
- Moussa Maaskri
- Omar Lofti

== Production ==
Filming took place in Morocco, around Casablanca, in 2015. Producer Fabrice Lambot described the film as "the first monster movie shot in Morocco."

== Release ==
Achoura premiered in December 2018 at the Paris International Fantastic Film Festival. The film then screened at the Brussels International Fantastic Film Festival on 12 April 2019. It had its North American premiere at the Cinepocalypse Film Festival in Chicago, Illinois, in June 2019, and later screened at the Sitges Film Festival in Spain in October 2019.

In 2021, Dark Star Pictures acquired distribution rights for Achoura; the film is set to be released on DVD and digital platforms in the United States on December 14, 2021.

== Reception ==
In a mostly positive review of the film for Bloody Disgusting, Patrick Bromley noted the similarities between Achoura—which was shot in 2015—and the 2017 film It and its 2019 sequel. Bromley wrote that Achoura "offers a unique look into the fears and folklore of another culture. That it's so reminiscent of It does it a disservice, even if the movie itself cannot be faulted for the comparison. It's a serious, somber meditation on the death of innocence, bleaker than what Stephen King offers and full of powerful, evocative imagery all the way to its final moments."
