= Talal Selhami =

French film director

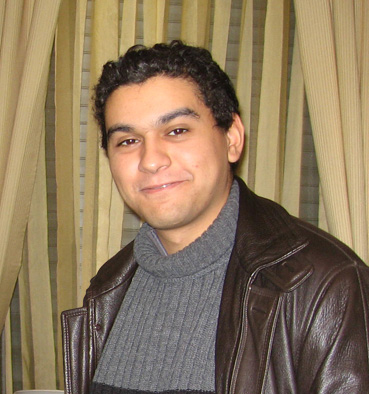
- Born: 11 March 1982 (age 44); Hauts-de-Seine, France
- Education: University of Paris 1 Pantheon-Sorbonne
- Occupations: Film director, producer, screenwriter
- Years active: 2005–present

Talal Selhami (Arabic: طلال السلهامي; born 11 March 1982) is a French-Moroccan filmmaker. He is best known as the director of the films Mirages (2010) and Achoura (2018), and an associate producer of the documentary film Creature Designers – The Frankenstein Complex (2015).

== Personal life ==
Selhami was born on 11 March 1982 in Neuilly-sur-Seine as the youngest son of the family. His father Mohamed is a Moroccan journalist and founder of the newspaper Maroc Hebdo International. He completed a master's degree in arts and entertainment, specializing in production, at the University of Paris 1 Pantheon-Sorbonne.

== Career ==
In 2005, Selhami made his maiden short Sinistra. After the success of the short, he made the short Partir en smoke in 2007. In 2010, he made his first feature film, Mirages. The film officially represented in Marrakech International Film Festival in 2010 and the Tangier National Film Festival in 2011. The film later won two awards: For Best Image and Best Female Interpretation. At the Brussels International Fantastic Film Festival (BIFFF) in Brussels, 2011 she film received a Special Jury Prize.

Selhami directed and co-wrote the Moroccan-French horror-fantasy film Achoura (2018). The film was screened in fifteen festivals around the world: including, the Paris International Fantastic Film Festival, the international fantastic film festival in Brussels, the Bucheon International Fantastic Film Festival (BiFan) in South Korea and the Neuchâtel International Fantastic Film Festival (NIFFF) in Neuchâtel. Later in 2019, Selhami received the prize for the Best Production at the Tangier National Film Festival as well as the Jury Special Mention at the Sitges Film Festival. Meanwhile, the film also awarded the Best Film Award at the HARD:LINE International Film Festival in Germany.

== Filmography ==
Year	Film	Role	Genre	Ref.
2005	Sinistra	Director	Short film	
2007	Partir en smoke	Director	Short film	
2010	Mirages	Director, associate producer, writer	Film	
2015	Creature Designers - The Frankenstein Complex	Associate producer	Documentary	
2018	Achoura	Director, producer, writer	Film	
2020	Tell Me Why	Artist	Video game	
