= STJV =

Video game industry trade union

Syndicat des travailleureuses du jeu vidéo
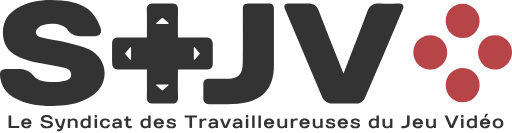
- Logo of the Syndicat des travailleureuses du jeu vidéo.
- Abbreviation: STJV
- Formation: 11 September 2017; 9 years ago
- Type: trade union
- Headquarters: Paris
- Location: France
- Members: ~1000 (2025)
- Website: https://www.stjv.fr/

The Syndicat des travailleureuses du jeu vidéo (Note: transl. Video game workers' union; alternatively Syndicat des travailleurs et travailleuses du jeu vidéo) or STJV, sometimes stylized as S+JV, is a video game industry trade union based in France. It was founded on 11 September 2017.

== History ==
The idea of creating the union was born in 2016 as a response to the El Khomri law, with the union being established a year later in 2017. The creation of the STJV was initiated by around 30 people from small groups of game developers. The union stated a desire to be represented by people other than their "owners" and to "represent all those who make video games in France, from the employee to the contractor to the trainee".

The STJV is part of a group federated by Game Workers Unite (GWU). The STJV and GWU jointly launched a survey in May 2019 of the writing professions in video games. The STJV states that it "provides its expertise and experience" to Game Workers Unite.

=== Strike actions and protests ===
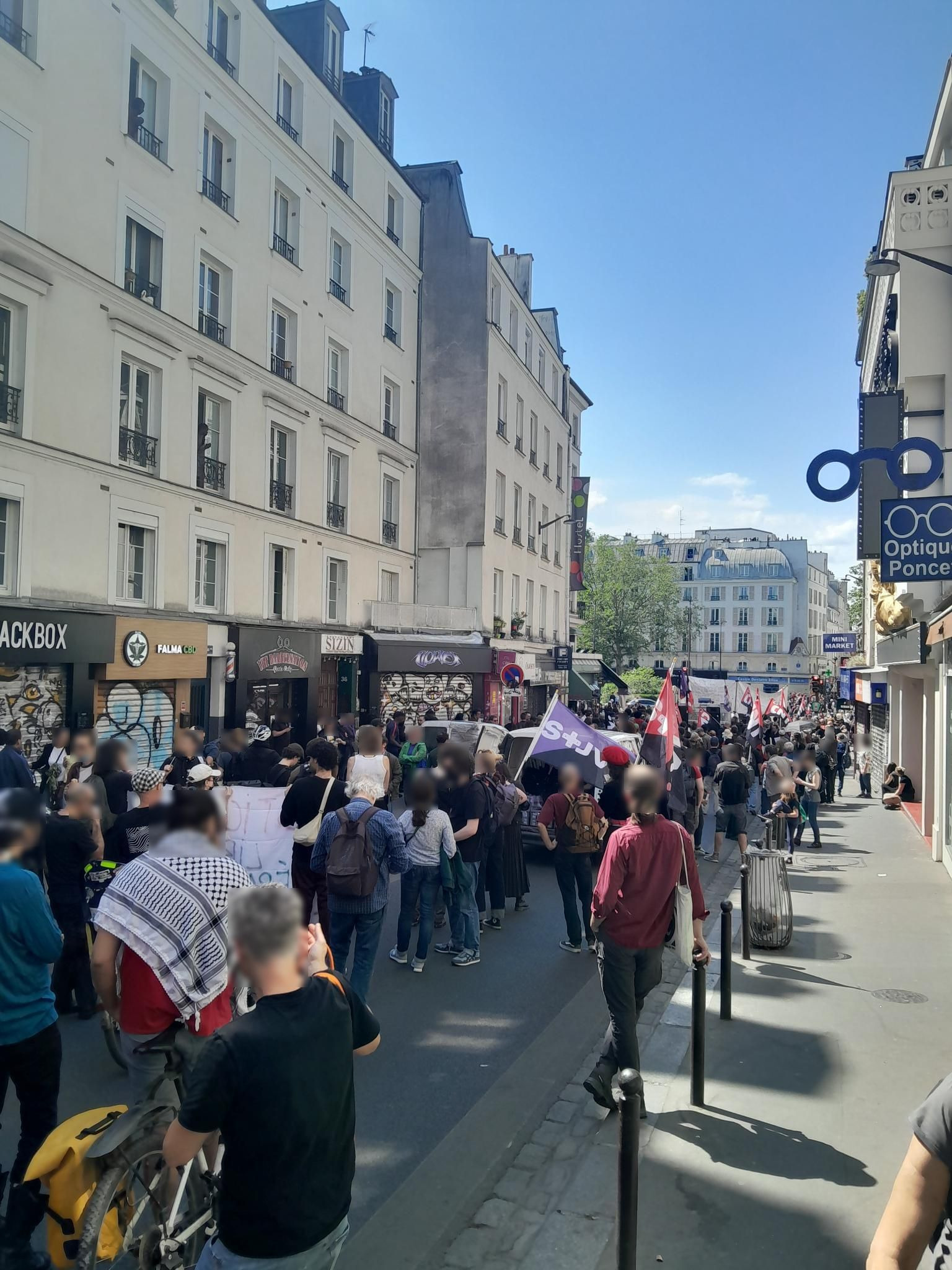
STJV participating in the annual 1 May anarchist demonstration in Paris with the Confédération nationale du travail (CNT-F), 2026.

On 14 February 2018, a statement was released through STJV in which 21 out of 44 workers claimed that Eugen Systems had denied overtime pay, delayed paychecks, reduced gross wages below French minimum wage requirements, and failed to honour contractual and collectively bargained obligations, and that they were going on strike until their demands were met. Eugen Systems released a statement denying the majority of these allegations, but admitting to two instances of delayed payrolls due to technical issues, rather than malicious intent. STJV set up a crowdfunding campaign to raise money to support the employees on strike. A statement from STJV a week later indicated that the strike was representative of a deeper lack of respect within the video game industry of programmers' experience and other abilities. Employees who were on strike met at each other's homes to support each other and plan meetings with the press, labour advocates, and politicians.

On 16 October 2024, the STJV organized a three-day strike of over 700 Ubisoft employees in France began a three-day strike, protesting the company's requirement to return to the office three days a week. The strike took involved Ubisoft's offices in Paris, Montpellier, Lyon, and Annecy. Workers expressed dissatisfaction over a lack of flexibility, salary increases, and profit-sharing, which they believe the company has ignored.

In January 2025, around 100 employees took part in a strike by the STJV against a redundancy plan by Don't Nod.

In August 2025, STJV members working at Arkane Studios released an open letter to the leaderships of Zenimax and Microsoft (who owned the company) announcing their support for Boycott, Divestment, Sanctions (BDS). They called on Microsoft to stop supporting Israel, arguing that continuing to do so made them "[an] accomplice of a genocide" in Gaza.

In 2026, Quantic Dream launched the multiplayer game Spellcasters Chronicles in February; the game was shut down just a few months later in May, wherein the company announced it would prepare to layoff workers. This decision was condemned by the STJV, and later called for a national strike to take place on 25 June at Quantic Dream headquarters. Citing, among other concerns, widespread layoffs and the increasing use of generative AI, the STJV argued that the greed and incompetence of video game bosses and French government negligence were to blame for the French video game industry's "disastrous situation".
