= Tell Me Why (video game) =

2020 video game

- Developer: Dontnod Entertainment
- Publisher: Xbox Game Studios
- Director: Florent Guillaume
- Producers: Arnaud de Pischoff; Dimitri Weideli
- Designer: Yoann Pignolé
- Programmers: Aurélien Caussin; Nicolas Sérouart
- Artists: Lucile Meunier; Grégory Zoltan Szucs; Talal Selhami
- Writers: Stéphane Beauverger; Morgan Lockhart
- Composer: Ryan Lott
- Engine: Unreal Engine 4
- Platforms: Windows; Xbox One
- Release: Chapter 1: Homecoming; August 27, 2020; Chapter 2: Family Secrets; September 3, 2020; Chapter 3: Inheritance; September 10, 2020
- Genre: Graphic adventure
- Mode: Single-player

Tell Me Why is a 2020 episodic adventure game developed by Dontnod Entertainment and published by Xbox Game Studios. The game consists of three chapters released for Windows and Xbox One in late 2020. It follows a pair of twins, Tyler and Alyson, with the ability to communicate with each other through telepathy, who reunite after ten years in their hometown in rural Alaska and investigate the death of their mother. A recurring theme of the story is the fallibility of memory, as the narrative explores the twins' childhood trauma and how they may each remember pivotal moments differently.

Since it was announced in November 2019, Tell Me Why has been noted for being the first major studio video game to feature a playable transgender main character. The developers consulted with expert groups for its themes, notably GLAAD, a non-governmental organization (NGO) monitoring media coverage of LGBT people, to ensure authentic and respectful portrayal of LGBT characters. A trans man was cast as the voice actor for Tyler Ronan, one of the two main characters, who had transitioned during his time away from his sister.

Tell Me Why received generally positive reviews from critics, who praised the complex characters, voice acting, narrative design and setting, as well as its competent handling of culturally sensitive subjects such as transgender topics. Criticisms included inconsistent storytelling and lack of engaging gameplay.

== Gameplay ==
Players control a pair of 21-year-old American twins, Tyler Ronan (voiced by August Aiden Black) and Alyson Ronan (voiced by Erica Lindbeck), as they revisit their childhood home following a traumatic event which resulted in the death of their mother Mary-Ann Ronan and a decade-long separation from each other. Besides their old home, which is maintained by Mary-Ann's friend Sam, the twins will also revisit parts of their fictional hometown of Delos Crossing in the U.S. state of Alaska and interact with its local residents. The twins share a supernatural bond that allow them to telepathically communicate with each other, and experience visions of past events which often manifests in vivid detail. The central gameplay mechanic of the game involves players guiding the twins as they experience recollections and visions of what had transpired in a series of scenarios spread across three episodes, and piece together the plot by watching them unfold, with each individual having different interpretations of what happened. The player will make decisions for the pair based on which version of the past events they want their avatar character to believe, which will impact the outcome of the game's narrative. Players can sometimes alternate between the perspectives of both siblings, whether in their interactions with the residents of Delos Crossing, or when going through the storybooks they played with as children. A majority of the game's puzzles are derived from decoding the metaphors compiled in the storybooks, which delve into the fairy tale life Mary-Ann imagined for herself and her struggles to manage her own reality.

=== Setting ===
Tyler's identity as a trans man is occasionally discussed or referenced within the game's narrative. The game includes the culture of the Tlingit people, an indigenous community in the Pacific Northwest Coast of North America with several Tlingit characters such as Delos police chief Eddy Brown and Michael Abila, a colleague of Alyson as well as Tyler's potential love interest. It also includes Filipino Catholic Tessa Vecchi, who runs a convenience store alongside her husband. The player's decisions during their interactions with the aforementioned non-player characters will define the circumstances of these characters as well as their relationships with the twins. The twins' bond with each other may be tested, depending on whether their attitude and behavior validates the other twin's convictions or memories.

== Plot ==
The game opens with a flashback sequence showing Tyler's confession to the murder of his mother, Mary-Ann, in self-defense as a child in 2005. Ten years later, an adult Tyler leaves the juvenile detention center he was sentenced to and reunites with Alyson, who has been adopted by Eddy, the investigating officer of the incident. Intending to move on with their lives, the twins return to Delos Crossing to sell their childhood home, but finds the house in a state of disrepair despite the efforts of Mary-Ann's friend Sam, who had turned to alcoholism since her death.

The twins recall memories of their childhood while exploring the house, particularly fairy tales about a runaway princess and her two goblin companions told by their mother, who compiled these stories into an illustrated journal called the "Book of Goblins". After learning about Tessa's discussions with Mary-Ann about Tyler's gender identity, the twins visit Tessa at her store, where they were told that Mary-Ann's behavior became increasingly erratic shortly before her death. The twins later speak to Eddy at the Delos police station, but he declines their request to see her file. Alyson later experiences a flashback where she stabbed Mary-Ann with a pair of scissors, and begins to suffer from post-traumatic stress.

The next morning, the twins break into the police archive and uncover files about Mary-Ann. After discovering their break-in, Eddy admits he had visited Mary-Ann to warn her on Tessa's instigation. The twins confront Tessa, who justified her actions and claimed that Mary-Ann isolated herself from the wider community, and that her alleged mental instability and parental incompetence was endangering her children. The twins return to the house to find the adjacent barn ablaze and an arsonist fleeing from the scene. After putting out the fire, the twins realized that the arsonist had tried to access a compartment beneath the barn floor containing a locked box, inside which they find letters from someone instructing Mary-Ann to get an abortion. The twins later experience a recollection of Mary-Ann arguing with an unseen man on a boat, and that Alyson was the one who stabbed their mother. The twins briefly go their separate ways following a disagreement.

Consumed with guilt and anxiety over Mary-Ann's death, Alyson's mental health deteriorates, leading to a severe panic attack. After she recovers, Alyson visits Sam to ask him about their potential familial ties, but discovers instead that an old photograph in his possession reveals a hidden loft above the barn. The twins regroup to investigate the loft and find a room of complex puzzles, which they solve using the Book of Goblins. They discover that Mary-Ann's fairy tales were actually metaphors for her troubled past: born to an overbearing family, she fell pregnant and fled to Delos Crossing to raise her baby, a son named Leo, who did not survive. The twins find a picture of their late half-sibling, along with a letter from Mary-Ann which is addressed to them.

The twins realize that Mary-Ann had suffered a mental breakdown over her fear of social services taking away her surviving children. The twins deduce that the unknown man on the boat, and their biological father, was in fact Tom Vecchi, Tessa's husband. After the twins confront Tom, the player as Alyson must decide whether she believes that Mary-Ann planned to kill herself and her two children, or that she had planned to kill only herself when Tyler interrupted her as alleged by Tom. Depending on Alyson's choices, two main concluding scenarios are presented:

- If Alyson chose to admit to Eddy that she killed Mary-Ann and/or took Tom's memory of her mother's death, Tyler returns to the house one last time, with Alyson in Juneau and receiving therapy.
- If Alyson never told Eddy that she was responsible for Mary-Ann's death and she believes that she saved Tyler from their mother, Alyson opts not to sell the house and moves in by herself and writes a new chapter in The Book of Goblins.

Many details of the epilogue are also determined by the player's previous choices: for example, whether they make peace with Eddy and/or Tessa, or whether the twins kept their telepathic bond and a close relationship all alter the ending.

== Development and release ==
Tell Me Why was announced during an Xbox London event on November 14, 2019. Director Florent Guillaume described the special bond between the game's twin protagonists as the “core mechanic” of the game. According to Lead Writer Morgan Lockhart, the story began as "one about family and how conflict can arise from contradictory memories of a past event". Lockhart said the story revolves around the twins and the small town in which they grew up, and from there the writing team added further layers to define who the characters are. The developers' goal is to depict an "honest" narrative about "harsh American realities", and examines themes of poverty, mental health and prejudice as part of its focus on the truth behind the death of the twins' mother Mary-Ann Ronan. Other themes of conflict which are hinted at in the game include gun rights and conversion therapy.

The developers worked with GLAAD aiming to make Tyler Ronan, a transgender character as a main character in a AAA video game, an "authentic representation of the trans experience". Nick Adams, GLAAD's Director of Transgender Media & Representation, was a consultant for the project and made recommendations for the appropriate casting decision behind Tyler. Voice actor August Aiden Black, who is a trans man, was cast as Tyler. Adams said the game strikes a balance between "not shying away" from Tyler's gender identity and showing the manner in which it affects him on a personal level, which mostly involve how others react to him. Clay Carmuche, Xbox Publishing's Narrative Director, suggests that the perspective of the storyteller as well as the subject of the story influences the topics that can be discussed and the nature of the stories that can be told. He noted that the story of the game can be told without any acknowledgement of Tyler's gender, but insisted that it is more interesting to explore something that is unfamiliar.

The developers stated that in response from criticism over the variable timing of episode releases for Life Is Strange, that they will commit to a release schedule for the three chapters over mid-2020. Initially, only subtitles were offered for localization as the dubbed voice recordings in French, German, Spanish (Mexico), and Portuguese (Brazil) were delayed due to the impact of the COVID-19 pandemic. The dubbings were later released on October 31, 2020.

On July 23, 2020, at Xbox Games Showcase, the chapter release dates were announced for weekly intervals from August to September 2020. The game was not made available to purchase in some countries, including Turkey, Russia, China, United Arab Emirates, Singapore, among others. A Microsoft spokesperson said that local game availability varies and the decision is based on a broad set of factors. It was available to be pre-ordered until the day of its release, August 27. On March 10, 2021, Chapter 1 of the game was made available for free on all platforms. From June 1 to 30, corresponding with Pride Month since 2021, the full game was made available for free.

Chapter	Release
1: Homecoming	August 27, 2020
2: Family Secrets	September 3, 2020
3: Inheritance	September 10, 2020

== Reception ==
Reception

Aggregate score
Aggregator	Score
Metacritic	PC: 75/100; XONE: 78/100

Review scores
Publication	Score
Electronic Gaming Monthly	4/5
Game Informer	7.75/10
GameRevolution	2.5/5
GameSpot	7/10
GamesRadar+	5/5
IGN	7/10
Shacknews	9/10

Tell Me Why received "generally favorable" reviews from critics, according to review aggregator website Metacritic. The game's depiction of trans identity was subject to debate, with mixed opinions.

Todd Martens from Los Angeles Times said the game attracted media attention when it was announced due to the developers' decision to feature Tyler as one of its lead characters, as well as their release of an extensive FAQ that sought to explain how it handled the portrayal of Tyler. Martens suggested that while the FAQ may be interpreted as trying to stay in control of a social media narrative, it also represented relatively uncommon minority representation resulting in an "extremely close reading" otherwise.

=== Accolades ===
At Gamescom 2020, it won Best Family Game. Gayming Magazine nominated it for Game of the Year in 2021.

Year	Award	Category	Result	Ref.
2020	The Game Awards	Game for Impact	Won	
2021	NAVGTR Awards	Outstanding Original Light Mix Score, New IP	Nominated	
2021	NAVGTR Awards	Outstanding Performance in a Drama, Lead	Nominated	
2021	Pégases Awards	Best Game	Nominated	
2021	Pégases Awards	Beyond the Video Game (Note: also known as Best Message-Bearer Game)	Won	
2021	Pégases Awards	Best Narrative Design	Won	
2021	Pégases Awards	Best Game Setting	Nominated	
2021	Pégases Awards	Best Character	Nominated	
2021	SXSW Gaming Awards	Matthew Crump Cultural Innovation Award	Nominated	
2021	British Academy Games Awards	Game Beyond Entertainment	Nominated	
2021	GLAAD Media Awards	Outstanding Video Game	Won	
