= London Games Festival =

Video gaming event in the United Kingdom

- Status: Active
- Genre: Video game
- Frequency: Annually
- Locations: London, United Kingdom
- Inaugurated: 2015
- Attendance: 100,000
- Organiser: Games London, Ukie
- Website: games.london}

The London Games Festival is an annual video gaming festival for both consumers and trade specialists held annually in April. The Festival is part of Games London an initiative to boost investment and skills in the capital, delivered by Film London and funded by £1.2 million investment from the Mayor of London.

== History ==
Games London was established in 2015 by Film London and UK Interactive Entertainment (Ukie), with support from the Mayor of London, to promote the city’s video games industry. It was launched with £1.2 million in funding from the London Enterprise Panel as part of a wider initiative to position London as a global centre for games development.

The programme’s main public-facing component, the London Games Festival, was first held in April 2016 across multiple venues, incorporating events such as the BAFTA Games Awards.

Since its launch, Games London has focused on industry growth and international promotion, with the annual festival expanding to include consumer and trade events, exhibitions, and investment activity. Attendance has grown to tens of thousands annually, with ongoing support from the Mayor of London.

== Dates and events ==
Date	Key Events
2 April - 13 April 2025	New Games Plus; Games Finance Market; Screen Play conference: Games Film & TV; BAFTA games Awards; London Games Festival Fringe; Now Play This; Trafalgar Square Games Festival
9 April - 25 April 2024	Games Finance Market; Screen Play conference: Games Film & TV; London Developer Conference; BAFTA games Awards; Games Impact Summit: Responsible tech, AI and games; London Games Festival Fringe; Now Play This; Official Selection; W.A.S.D.; Open Studios
29 March - April 8 2023	Official Selection: 32 games; W.A.S.D.; Now Play This; Ensemble: BAME Artists exhibition; Games Finance Market; Open Studios event
1-10 April 2022	Official Selection: 40 international games; Ensemble: BAME Artists exhibition; Games Finance Market; W.A.S.D. consumer videogames showcase; Now Play This; BAFTA Games Awards
19-28 March 2021	Official Selection Showcase: 40 international games; World Stage: hosting talks and broadcast events; Now Play This at Home - virtual event; Games Finance Market - virtual event; BAFTA Games Awards - virtual event
26 March - 6 April 2020	Now Play This at Home - virtual event; Ensemble - virtual event; Games London Business Hub - virtual event; Games Finance Market - virtual event; BAFTA Games Awards Livestream; Autistica Play Livestream
2–14 April 2019	Now Play This; Games Finance Market; Ensemble 2: BAME Artists Exhibition; EGX Rezzed; The Games Character Parade; The Festival Fringe
5–15 April 2018	Now Play This; Games Finance Market; EGX Rezzed; Trafalgar Square Games Festival; Ensemble: BAME Artists Exhibition; Bafta Games Awards
30 March – 9 April 2017	Now Play This; Games Finance Market; EGX Rezzed; Games Culture Summit; Bafta Games Awards; Dear Esther Live
1–10 April 2016	Now Play This; Games Audio Summit; Games Finance Market; EGX Rezzed; 'LGF @ BFI' talks series; Bafta Game Awards; VR Summit; 'The Games Europe Plays' exhibition at Finnish Institute; London Games Fringe

== Previous years ==
A previous London Games Festival ran until 2012 featuring a series of diverse events from the world of interactive entertainment. Video games publishers, developers, partners, personalities, trade organisations, media organisations and individuals were all involved in the week-long celebrations. The LGF provided the industry with the opportunity to showcase creativity and artistry, from script-writers to animators, musicians to programmers.

The Festival also worked to enhance perceptions of interactive entertainment and the industry by engaging with existing institutional advocates (BAFTA, ELSPA, DfES, DCMS, BBFC, DTI, LDA) and illustrating compelling and positive research while promoting future vision and horizons of the games industry. Alongside the week of media and/or consumer-facing events were a number of B2B events organised by the industry's trade bodies and other organisations.

The festival was also complemented by a Fringe, an offshoot of the more mainstream and commercially focused Festival, with an abundance of interesting and diverse events for games and non-gamers alike. Highlights in 2007 included:

The Soho Project, that offered players a chance to take part in a mass ‘reality game’ on the streets of Soho, via the website.

Games AV - a live concert, screening and club night features musicians, DJs, VJs, filmmakers, animators and digital artists whose work has been shaped by video games culture.

Sense of Play ran annually as part of the Fringe from 2005–2007. Each event was a one-day symposium which looked at the future of games design in its broadest sense featuring some of the most inspiring voices working in, around and beyond the games industry. The event was directed, curated and produced by Toby Barnes and Jon Weinbren. Plans are afoot for a relaunch which will look at the interplays and crossovers between games, film, television, theatre and other creative industries.

Also in 2007, London Games Skills Week offered a week long series of seminars designed to attract new talent into the games industry from a broad spectrum of creative disciplines. A pop-up Games Fringe Cafe and drop-in lounge was set up at Soho TV and post-production training facility 01zero-one which was open to all festival attendees. 01zero-one also housed the ZeroGamer exhibition which featured "...games that play themselves, video documents of in-game performance, game engine experiments and challenging documentaries on gameplay."
