= Syndicat des éditeurs de logiciels de loisirs =

- Abbreviation: SELL
- Formation: 1995
- Region served: France

SELL (Syndicat des éditeurs de logiciels de loisirs) is a French organisation created in 1995 that promotes the interests of video game developers. It was founded by Infogrames' CEO Bruno Bonnell. The group mainly distributes information about video game professionals to authorities and consumers. The group is chaired by Julie Chalmette from Bethesda France since 2016, and the general delegate is Nicolas Vignolles since 2020.

== Video game classifications ==
From June 1999 until the arrival in 2003 of PEGI, the organisation rated the content of video games in France.

Icon	Description	Translation
	Pour tous publics	For all ages
	Déconseillé aux moins de 12 ans	Not advised for kids under 12 years old
	Déconseillé aux moins de 16 ans	Not advised for kids under 16 years old
	Interdit aux moins de 18 ans	Prohibited under 18

== Management ==
In 1995, Bruno Bonnell, then CEO of Infogrames, founded the SELL and became its first Chairman; Hervé Pasgrimaud was appointed General Delegate.

In 2002, Jean-Claude Larue became chairman, then general delegate between 2003 and 2012.

In 2003, Christian Bellone succeeded Jean-Claude Larue as president. He was re-elected in 2004.

In 2005, SELL was chaired by Geoffroy Sardin (then CEO of Ubisoft France), and counted some forty members.

In 2006, Philippe Sauze succeeded him as president. He was re-elected in 2007 and 2008.

In 2009, Georges Fornay took over the presidency of SELL, having previously been a member of the Board of Directors. Fornay stepped down from the presidency in 2011, then became secretary general between 2011 and 2012.

From September 2011 to September 2013, the union was chaired by James Rebours, Managing Director of SEGA France and Germany.

In September 2012, David Neichel, CEO of Activision Blizzard France, was elected president of the SELL; Emmanuel Martin was appointed interim delegate general, before being appointed delegate general on 1 August 2013.

In November 2014, Jean-Claude Ghinozzi, director of Microsoft France's Retail Sales and Marketing division, was elected president for a two-year term.

In December 2016, Julie Chalmette, General Manager of Bethesda, was unanimously elected president of SELL. She was re-elected for a two-year term in 2018, and again in 2020.

In September 2020, Nicolas Vignolles was appointed SELL General Delegate.
