= List of PC games (L) =

The following page is an alphabetical section from the list of PC games.

== L ==
Name	Developer	Publisher	Genre(s)	Operating system(s)	Date released
L.A. Noire	Team Bondi	Rockstar Games	Action-adventure	Microsoft Windows	May 17, 2011
Lands of Lore: Guardians of Destiny	Westwood Studios	Virgin Interactive	RPG	MS-DOS, Microsoft Windows	September 30, 1997
Lands of Lore: The Throne of Chaos	Westwood Studios	Virgin Interactive	RPG	MS-DOS, PC-98	1993
Lands of Lore III	Westwood Studios	Electronic Arts	RPG	Microsoft Windows	March 3, 1999
Lara Croft and the Guardian of Light	Crystal Dynamics	Square Enix	Action-adventure	Microsoft Windows	August 18, 2010
Lara Croft and the Temple of Osiris	Crystal Dynamics	Square Enix	Action-adventure	Microsoft Windows	December 8, 2014
Layers of Fear	Bloober Team	Aspyr	Survival horror	Microsoft Windows, Linux, macOS	February 16, 2016
League of Legends	Riot Games	Riot Games	MOBA	Microsoft Windows, macOS	October 27, 2009
Left 4 Dead	Valve, Turtle Rock Studios	Valve	First-person shooter, Survival horror	Microsoft Windows, Linux, macOS	November 18, 2008
Left 4 Dead 2	Valve	Valve	First-person shooter, Survival horror	Microsoft Windows, Linux, macOS	November 17, 2009
Legends of Callasia	Boomzap Entertainment	Boomzap Entertainment	Turn-based strategy	Microsoft Windows, macOS	June 10, 2016
Lego Batman: The Videogame	Traveller's Tales	Warner Bros. Interactive Entertainment, Feral Interactive	Action-adventure	Microsoft Windows, macOS	September 23, 2008
Lego Batman 2: DC Super Heroes	Traveller's Tales	Warner Bros. Interactive Entertainment, Feral Interactive	Action-adventure	Microsoft Windows, macOS	June 23, 2012
Lego Batman 3: Beyond Gotham	Traveller's Tales	Warner Bros. Interactive Entertainment, Feral Interactive	Action-adventure	Microsoft Windows, macOS	November 11, 2014
Lego DC Super-Villains	Traveller's Tales	Warner Bros. Interactive Entertainment	Action-adventure	Microsoft Windows	October 16, 2018
Lego Harry Potter: Years 1–4	Traveller's Tales	Warner Bros. Interactive Entertainment	Action-adventure	Microsoft Windows, macOS	June 29, 2010
Lego Harry Potter: Years 5–7	Traveller's Tales	Warner Bros. Interactive Entertainment	Action-adventure	Microsoft Windows, macOS	November 11, 2011
Lego Indiana Jones: The Original Adventures	Traveller's Tales	LucasArts	Action-adventure	Microsoft Windows, Mac OS X	June 3, 2008
Lego Indiana Jones 2: The Adventure Continues	Traveller's Tales	LucasArts; Feral Interactive	Action-adventure	Microsoft Windows, Mac OS X	November 17, 2009
Lego Jurassic World	Traveller's Tales	Warner Bros. Interactive Entertainment	Action-adventure	Microsoft Windows, macOS	June 12, 2015
Lego Marvel's Avengers	Traveller's Tales	Warner Bros. Interactive Entertainment	Action-adventure	Microsoft Windows, macOS	January 26, 2016
Lego Marvel Super Heroes	Traveller's Tales	Warner Bros. Interactive Entertainment	Action-adventure	Microsoft Windows, macOS	October 22, 2013
Lego Marvel Super Heroes 2	Traveller's Tales	Warner Bros. Interactive Entertainment	Action-adventure	Microsoft Windows	November 14, 2017
Lego Rock Raiders	Data Design Interactive	Lego Media	Real-time strategy, action	Microsoft Windows	November 15, 1999
Lego Star Wars: The Video Game	Traveller's Tales	Eidos Interactive	Action-adventure	Microsoft Windows, OS X	March 29, 2005
Lego Star Wars: The Force Awakens	Traveller's Tales	Warner Bros. Interactive Entertainment	Action-adventure	Microsoft Windows, macOS	June 28, 2016
Lego The Hobbit	Traveller's Tales	Warner Bros. Interactive Entertainment	Action-adventure	Microsoft Windows, macOS	April 8, 2014
Lego The Incredibles	Traveller's Tales	Warner Bros. Interactive Entertainment	Action-adventure	Microsoft Windows	July 24, 2018
Lego The Lord of the Rings	Traveller's Tales	Warner Bros. Interactive Entertainment	Action-adventure	Microsoft Windows, macOS	November 13, 2012
Lego Worlds	Traveller's Tales	Warner Bros. Interactive Entertainment	Sandbox	Microsoft Windows	March 7, 2017
Leisure Suit Larry series	Sierra Entertainment, High Voltage Software, Team17, Replay Games	Sierra Entertainment, Codemasters, Replay Games	Graphic adventure	MS-DOS, Microsoft Windows, Linux, macOS	June 5, 1987
Lethal Company	Zeekerss	Zeekerss	Survival horror	Microsoft Windows	October 23, 2023
Liar's Bar	Curve Animation	Curve Animation	Social deduction, Indie	Microsoft Windows	October 2, 2024
Life Is Strange	Dontnod Entertainment	Square Enix	Adventure	Microsoft Windows, Linux, macOS	January 30, 2015
Life Is Strange 2	Dontnod Entertainment	Square Enix	Adventure	Microsoft Windows, Linux, macOS	September 27, 2018
Life Is Strange: Before the Storm	Deck Nine	Square Enix	Adventure	Microsoft Windows, Linux, macOS	August 31, 2017
Life Is Strange: Double Exposure	Deck Nine	Square Enix	Adventure	Microsoft Windows	October 29, 2024
Life Is Strange: Reunion	Deck Nine	Square Enix	Adventure	Microsoft Windows	March 26, 2026
Life Is Strange: True Colors	Deck Nine	Square Enix	Adventure	Microsoft Windows, Linux, macOS	September 10, 2021
Lightning Returns: Final Fantasy XIII	Square Enix	Square Enix	Role-playing	Microsoft Windows	December 10, 2015
Like a Dragon Gaiden: The Man Who Erased His Name	Ryu Ga Gotoku Studio	SEGA	Action-adventure	Microsoft Windows	November 9, 2023
Like a Dragon: Infinite Wealth	Ryu Ga Gotoku Studio	SEGA	Role-playing	Microsoft Windows	January 26, 2024
Like a Dragon: Ishin!	Ryu Ga Gotoku Studio	SEGA	Action-adventure	Microsoft Windows	February 21, 2023
Like a Dragon: Pirate Yakuza in Hawaii	Ryu Ga Gotoku Studio	SEGA	Action-adventure; Beat 'em up; hack and slash	Microsoft Windows	February 21, 2025
Lil' Guardsman	Hilltop Studios	Versus Evil, TinyBuild	Puzzle	Microsoft Windows, Mac OS X	January 23, 2024
Lineage	NCSOFT	NCSOFT	MMORPG	Microsoft Windows, Mac OS X	September 3, 1998
Little Nightmares	Tarsier Studios	Bandai Namco Entertainment	Puzzle-platformer, Survival horror	Microsoft Windows	April 28, 2017
Little Nightmares II	Tarsier Studios	Bandai Namco Entertainment	Puzzle-platformer, Survival horror	Microsoft Windows	February 11, 2021
Little Nightmares III	Supermassive Games	Bandai Namco Entertainment	Puzzle-platformer, Survival horror	Microsoft Windows	October 10, 2025
Lobotomy Corporation	Project Moon	Project Moon	Management simulation, indie	Microsoft Windows	April 9, 2018
London Taxi: Rush Hour	Data Design Interactive	Metro3D Europe	Driving	Microsoft Windows	June 23, 2006
Lost Judgment	Ryu Ga Gotoku Studio	SEGA	Action-adventure	Microsoft Windows	September 14, 2022
Lovely Planet	QUICKTEQUILA	tinyBuild	First-person shooter, indie	Microsoft Windows, Linux, macOS	July 31, 2014
Luftrausers	Vlambeer	Devolver Digital	Shoot 'em Up	Microsoft Windows, macOS, Linux	March 18, 2014
