= Life Is Strange 2 =

2018–2019 graphic adventure video game

- Developer: Dontnod Entertainment (Note: Dragon's Lake Entertainment developed the Switch version.)
- Publisher: Square Enix (Note: Feral Interactive developed and published the Linux and macOS versions.)
- Directors: Michel Koch; Raoul Barbet
- Producer: Luc Baghadoust
- Designer: Kevin Poupard
- Programmers: Nicolas Sérouart; Jérôme Banal
- Artists: Michel Koch; Mathieu Beaudelin; Edouard Caplain
- Writers: Christian Divine; Jean-Luc Cano
- Composer: Jonathan Morali
- Series: Life Is Strange
- Engine: Unreal Engine 4
- Platforms: PlayStation 4; Windows; Xbox One; Linux; macOS; Nintendo Switch
- Release: 27 September 2018: Episode 1: Roads; 27 September 2018; Episode 2: Rules; 24 January 2019; Episode 3: Wastelands; 9 May 2019; Episode 4: Faith; 22 August 2019; Episode 5: Wolves; 3 December 2019
- Genre: Adventure
- Mode: Single-player

Life Is Strange 2 is a 2018 episodic adventure game in the Life is Strange series, developed by Dontnod Entertainment and published by Square Enix. The game's plot features Mexican-American brothers Sean and Daniel as they travel along the US West Coast as fugitives from the police after the younger brother discovers his telekinetic abilities. In the game, which is played from a third-person perspective, Sean must make crucial decisions that will lead to different branches in the storyline, while serving as a surrogate parent for Daniel.

Following the unexpected success of Life Is Strange (2015), development of a second game started in 2016 after the team completed the retail edition of the first game. The primary creative team behind the original returned for the sequel. The team chose a road movie structure in contrast to the original game, and was inspired by films and novels such as Into the Wild and Of Mice and Men. While the game features supernatural elements, the story is mostly grounded in reality, and the team used the opportunity to explore contemporary social issues such as racism, gun violence, and bigotry. The game was teased in May 2017 and a free demo, The Awesome Adventures of Captain Spirit, was released in June 2018 in order to introduce the new setting. Its five episodes were released between September 2018 and December 2019 for PlayStation 4, Windows, and Xbox One and later for Linux, macOS and Nintendo Switch.

The game received generally positive reviews upon release. Critics praised the story, the relationship between Sean and Daniel, and the gameplay, while the reception of the portrayed political themes was divergent. The sparse episodic release schedule and the dialogue were criticized. It received nominations for multiple year-end accolades. Dontnod stated to have shifted its focus to develop their own intellectual properties in May 2021. The series' next game Life Is Strange: True Colors, developed by Deck Nine, was released in September 2021.

== Gameplay ==
The decision-making mechanic showing two actions, each with an outcome that may affect later parts of the story

Life Is Strange 2 is a graphic adventure game played from a third-person view. The player takes control of a teenager named Sean Diaz (Gonzalo Martin), who is on the run with his younger brother, Daniel (Roman Dean George), following a tragic incident. As the story unfolds, the two brothers encounter various non-playable characters who interact with Sean via dialogue trees. Sean is presented with numerous choices throughout the game, both major and minor, which lead to different branches in the storyline. Many of Sean's actions teach Daniel lessons that influence his worldview. This influence is continuously tracked in the background by two hidden variables: Morality and Brotherhood. For instance, stealing around Daniel will teach him theft, but on top of that, it will prompt him to show less regard for social norms or other people. Daniel may also grow to resent Sean if his actions do not align with his previous lessons, and he may no longer adapt to Sean's judgement if he is not able to maintain a trusted relationship with Daniel. Following conventional ethics and preserving brotherly trust may not always be compatible with each other. The game tracks how many players received each outcome and lets the player compare their choices against the rest of the player base. While the main plot points remain mostly the same, Daniel's personality constantly evolves depending on Sean's choices, which results in a variety of Daniel's responses, autonomous actions, and eventually culminates in several different endings.

Sean can interact with the environment and obtain objects, which can then be stored in Sean's backpack and used later. When Sean picks up an object, he will comment on them, providing players the backstory for each item and adding context to the world. Sean's backpack can also be decorated with souvenirs he collects in the world. As Sean and Daniel explore various locations, Sean can also enjoy moments of calm at designated locations and sketch the environment around him.

== Plot ==
In October 2016, 16-year-old Sean Diaz lives with his 9-year-old brother Daniel and father Esteban (Amador Plascencia) in Seattle, after their mother Karen (Jolene Andersen) left them following Daniel's birth. The day the game begins, Sean intervenes when their neighbor Brett (Robert Shearer) harasses Daniel, inadvertently injuring Brett as a police officer passes by. Esteban arrives at the scene and is shot and killed by the officer. A sudden explosion damages the environment, and Sean flees with Daniel before more police arrive. Now fugitives, Sean aims to take them to their father's Mexican hometown of Puerto Lobos. Near Mount Rainier, the brothers are recognized by the owner of a gas station, but escape with the help of travel blogger Brody Holloway (Bolen Walker). Brody arranges a motel room for the brothers, where Daniel learns of Esteban's death and becomes angry, revealing he has latent telekinetic abilities that were the cause of the explosion in Seattle.

The brothers then spend a month at an abandoned cabin, where Sean helps train Daniel's ability. After Daniel falls ill, Sean decides to take him to their maternal grandparents, Claire (Nancy Cronig) and Stephen Reynolds (John O'Connell), in nearby Beaver Creek, Oregon. At Beaver Creek, Claire and Stephen accept the brothers and agree to hide them, despite their concerns. Daniel also befriends Chris (Chandler Mantione), an imaginative boy that lives next door, after using his powers to save him from falling from his treehouse; (Note: As depicted in The Awesome Adventures of Captain Spirit) Chris comes to think he has superpowers. Daniel coerces Sean into breaking into Karen's old room to learn more about her. The police soon arrive on word that Sean and Daniel have been sighted in public or traced from interactions. Claire, Stephen, and Chris then help the brothers to escape.

In February 2017, Sean and Daniel join freighthoppers Finn (Matthew Gallenstein) and Cassidy (Sarah J. Bartholomew) traveling to California, and the four secure paying jobs at a cannabis farm in Humboldt County, California for a cultivator named Merrill (Ben Jurand). Sean spends more time with their new friends, leaving Daniel frustrated and feeling abandoned. One payday, Merrill discovers Daniel snooping around and fires the brothers without paying them. Daniel accidentally reveals his telekinesis to the others, and Finn comes up with a plan to use it to steal money from Merrill. Sean either joins Finn and Daniel in breaking into Merrill's house or follows them upon learning that they went behind his back. Regardless, the heist fails, and Merrill threatens the group with a shotgun. In a panicked rage, Daniel destroys Merrill's house with his powers, knocking out everyone else and causing Sean's left eye to be impaled.

Sean wakes from a coma two months later under FBI custody. He finds a letter from Jacob (David Valdes), one of the farmworkers, in which he writes that he found Daniel after the accident and took him to Haven Point, Nevada – an isolated commune where he was raised. Sean escapes from custody and travels to Haven Point. There, he finds Daniel has been taken in by Lisbeth (Victoria Hansen), the leader of a religious cult, who is presenting Daniel's powers as a divine gift to gain devoted followers and manipulate Daniel into submission. After an initial attempt to recover Daniel, Sean meets Karen, whom Jacob had also contacted for help. Sean and Karen begin to reconnect and establish a plan with Jacob to save him. They ultimately convince Daniel to come with them, and the church burns down.

Sean and Daniel travel with Karen to the secluded community of Away, Arizona, and spend the next seven weeks resting, having fun, and making last arrangements before crossing into Mexico. Sean befriends a few residents, including David Madsen (D.W. McCann) – a former security officer from Arcadia Bay, Oregon. (Note: David first appeared in Life Is Strange as the step-father of Chloe Price, one of the main characters of the game. The player is asked which of the two endings of Life Is Strange they opted for, which is reflected in Sean's discussion with David.) The brothers learn that authorities have tracked their location, but Karen allows her sons to escape by staying behind to be arrested. The two arrive at the Mexico–United States barrier, which Daniel breaks open with his powers. However, before they can cross, Daniel is abruptly wounded by a bullet from two vigilantes, and the group is captured by the local police shortly after.

The next morning, July 4th, Daniel breaks Sean out of interrogation, and the two flee to a Mexican port of entry but find it blockaded by FBI and United States Border Patrol agents. Sean must decide whether he and Daniel should turn themselves in or use Daniel's powers to force their way through. The outcome of this decision depends on whether Daniel was raised to follow the rules of society (High Morality) or to put himself and Sean above all else (Low Morality).

- Blood Brothers Ending:
  If Daniel accepts Sean's decision to cross the border, he uses his powers to fight the opposing police force and destroy the crossing. Once the road is clear, both brothers make it to Mexico alive. They open a garage in Puerto Lobos, like their father had, and settle down as fugitives, relying on Daniel's powers to survive and stay safe.
- Parting Ways Ending:
  If Daniel rejects Sean's decision to cross the border, he reluctantly uses his powers to help Sean drive through the blockade, then surrenders himself to the agents. Daniel lives with Claire and Stephen under police surveillance, while Sean lives in Puerto Lobos as a fugitive, either alone or with Cassidy or Finn, occasionally sending Daniel postcards.
- Redemption Ending:
  If Daniel accepts Sean's decision to surrender, they both let the agents apprehend them. Sean is taken into custody, while Daniel lives with Claire and Stephen before the two reunite fifteen years later, when Sean is released from prison. Afterwards, Sean and Daniel go camping in the woods for a night in an attempt to rebuild their bond as brothers.
- Lone Wolf Ending:
  If Daniel rejects Sean's decision to surrender, he becomes desperate and uses his powers to force them both across the border anyway. The scene ends with Sean shot dead by the police and Daniel left alone in Mexico. Daniel grows up in Puerto Lobos as a fugitive, using his powers to steal, defend himself, and survive on his own.

== Development ==
Life Is Strange 2 was developed by French developer Dontnod Entertainment with Square Enix External Studios, which started the game's production after it shipped the retail edition of the first game in 2016. It was decided early that the sequel would feature a cast of new characters, with director Michel Koch likening the franchise to TV series such as True Detective or American Horror Story in 2015. The development team believed that the franchise was about common people that players can relate to, and stories that are grounded in reality and reflective of the player's own experience. By introducing new characters, the team can try something different and explore different themes. According to the team, the story of Max and Chloe (the protagonists of the first game) has already been completed. David, a returning character, makes a small appearance in Episode 5. The team included him in the sequel because he always survives the events of the first game and that through him, players can discover "little hints" regarding the fate of Max and Chloe. The team avoids giving too many details about their fates, as the first game does not have a canon ending and featuring them too heavily in the story may displease fans who are heavily invested in fan fiction. David's appearance helps connect the sequel to the first game without confusing new audiences.

The photography of Mike Brodie helped inspire the game's story.

Unlike the first game, which is set in one place, Life Is Strange 2 is structured like a road movie. The team did not want to develop a retread of the first game, and wanted the sequel to significantly deviate from the original's formula. The team was inspired by films and novels such as Into the Wild, Stand By Me, Of Mice and Men, and On the Road. Dontnod conducted field research on the West Coast of the United States, meeting people and taking pictures. The drifters (Finn and Cassidy) featured in the game were inspired by the photography of Mike Brodie, a freighthopper who took photos of the people he had encountered throughout his journey, and his book A Period of Juvenile Prosperity. In particular, his series of photos about a child who grew up on the road served as the foundation of the game's characters who become "outcasts living on the outskirts of society". The team hoped that through exploring their stories, they can show players that there are many ways for people to live their lives.

Writing the characters was a challenge for lead writer Jean Luc-Cano, who first wrote the story with a team in French, and the script was then passed to American writer Christian Divine who helped refine its tone and accuracy. Unlike the first game, which gives an ample amount of time for characters to develop, characters in the sequel have to be introduced quickly due to the road film structure. The players must decide if they should trust these characters within a short period of time. Like the first game, animal symbolism is featured heavily in this game, as the team believed that these animal symbols and metaphors help to "[bring] something visual for players". (Note: Throughout the game, Sean and Daniel are referred to as the "wolf brothers".)

One of the story's central themes is education: Sean must choose what kind of example he wants to be for Daniel, who will learn from him and follow what he does. Daniel's telekinesis may not be the game's primary focus, but its inclusion helps players understand the far-reaching consequences of their influence on another person, since the way these powers are later used is directly tied to Sean's lessons. The game's endings are the ultimate reflection of what Daniel learns from Sean over the course of all five episodes. The team did not create a perfect ending for the characters because, in the real world, such an ending is practically impossible to achieve. To ensure that the educational aspect of the game is genuine, the team read books and documents produced by psychologists and sociologists to gain more insight. The team also spent an extensive amount of time developing Daniel's artificial intelligence to make him "believable, sensible, and sometimes super-cute". The developers recognised that brotherly bonding is rarely perfect and relationships between siblings can be complicated. Sean, as a teenager, yearns to find people around him to develop his own life and seldom wants everything to revolve around his younger brother. Throughout the game, players must navigate this tension between Sean's personal interests, like spending time with new characters, and taking care of Daniel. The team spent a lot of time finding the right balance to ensure that the relationship between the two brothers does not feel obnoxious and that players do not grow to dislike Sean as the story progresses. Cano used his own personal experience interacting with his elder brother and daughter while developing the brotherhood relationship between Sean and Daniel, as well as the educational aspect of the game.

As the story is grounded in reality, the team explored various real-world social issues such as racism, alcoholism, gun violence, and bigotry. While the game takes place in the United States, director Raoul Barbet states that these problems are universal and their depictions in the game allow players to reflect on their own experiences. He adds that the team did not want to "gamify a difficult subject", and worked to ensure that characters evolve naturally throughout the story. Superpowers were included to add a sense of urgency. The team wanted the story to inspire players to "talk more to other people when they meet someone that's different from them". They also hoped that players would ultimately feel a sense of loss when the story concludes, as they would have related to the experiences of Sean and Daniel. The team worked to show that the world is a violent one, as they believed that brotherhood between the two protagonists can develop as they face various adversities together. Homelessness is also one of the game's main themes, and the team consulted various charity organisations to ensure that its portrayal was accurate. In November 2019, Square Enix collaborated with charity Centrepoint for their We Will Be Heard campaign about awareness of services for young homeless people.

The game also introduces various gameplay improvements. Players are no longer locked in a cutscene while interacting with people or objects, and Sean can now walk around while conversing with others. The game uses Unreal Engine 4 and has improved lip syncing and facial animation compared to the original. Jonathan Morali returned to compose the score for the sequel. The music contains both original and licensed tracks. Licensed tracks include, among others, songs from Phoenix, The Streets, Sufjan Stevens, and First Aid Kit.

== Release ==
Square Enix announced that the studio was working on a new Life Is Strange game on 18 May 2017 via a short video. Prior to the reveal of the game, a free demo, The Awesome Adventures of Captain Spirit, was released on 25 June 2018, serving as an introduction to the new setting and featuring a character from the game named Chris. The game was officially unveiled at Gamescom on 20 August 2018 by publisher Square Enix along the release date of the first episode, which adopted an episodic format similar to the first game. Microsoft announced the game's first episode to be become available to Xbox Game Pass subscribers on Xbox consoles in January 2019, with the other episodes following soon after. In March 2019, Dontnod explained the game had a more complicated development due to its road film structure, as each episode features a new set of characters and new environments. They could not reuse assets created for earlier episodes, and had to organize auditions and castings for each episode. The episodes took longer to develop when compared to the first game, resulting in a more sparse release schedule, which the team believed may have affected players' investment in the story and the characters, possibly resulting in a more muted audience response when compared to the first game. Retail editions of the game were released in Europe on 3 December 2019 and in North America on 4 February 2020. Feral Interactive released all five episodes for Linux and macOS on 19 December 2019. On 18 September 2020, Episode 1: Roads was made free for all platforms. A Nintendo Switch port was released on 2 February 2023.

| No. | Title | Release date |
|---|---|---|
| 1 | "Roads" | 27 September 2018 |
| 2 | "Rules" | 24 January 2019 |
| 3 | "Wastelands" | 9 May 2019 |
| 4 | "Faith" | 22 August 2019 |
| 5 | "Wolves" | 3 December 2019 |

== Reception ==
=== Critical reception ===
Aggregate review scores
| Game | Metacritic |
|---|---|
| Complete Season | PC: 70/100; PS4: 78/100; XONE: 79/100 |
| Episode 1: Roads | PC: 80/100; PS4: 81/100; XONE: 80/100 |
| Episode 2: Rules | PC: 79/100; PS4: 73/100; XONE: 74/100 |
| Episode 3: Wastelands | PC: 78/100; PS4: 75/100; XONE: 73/100 |
| Episode 4: Faith | PC: 82/100; PS4: 77/100; XONE: 74/100 |
| Episode 5: Wolves | PC: 83/100; PS4: 82/100; XONE: 83/100 |

The game received "generally positive reviews"—except for PC version, which was met with "mixed or average reviews"—according to review aggregator platform Metacritic. Its portrayal of Hispanic Americans and relation to racial issues in the US was debated in media articles.

The game's themes received generally positive reviews. In their complete season review, The Verge's Andrew Webster described the game as a powerful and compelling experience, and believed that it is a rare video game that tackles the realities of modern life. Webster described the game as a "powerful statement about American politics during a very tense time". Washington Post's Elise Favis lauded its incorporation of political themes for enriching the story and prompting players to empathize with the characters, adding that it brings "a nuance to the world and a reflection of the real lives of others in modern America". Caty McCarthy from USgamer described the game as an earnest attempt by Dontnod to explore contemporarily American social issues, but she was disappointed by its execution. She added that as the season progresses, the exploration of these issues becomes formulaic. Alistair Jones from PC Gamer believed that the game's focus on political and social issues compromised its central themes, such as family and brotherhood. Gita Jackson from Kotaku praised the game for being heartfelt, adding that in each episode, the game "pleads with you to care about the kinds of people you’d normally overlook". However, Joe Juba from Game Informer described the side characters as stereotypical, and remarked that some of the encounters were "contrived".

The game's story received generally positive reviews from critics. McCarthy remarked that the game is at its best when Daniel and Sean are bonding with each other. While she lamented that other side characters have limited roles, she was able to relate to the experiences of the two brothers and often eagerly anticipated where the story takes them. She further praised the choice-based gameplay for being "tangible", as Daniel's behaviors and actions are the embodiment of the choices Sean has made. Joshua Rivera, also from Kotaku, described the game as a "heartbreakingly accurate brotherhood simulator" due to the educational themes in the game. Ozzie Mejia from Shacknews described the education aspect of the game as its most captivating element. He praised how small choices contributed to the game's endings, and remarked that it was a significant improvement over the first game. Tom Phillips, writing for Eurogamer, also enjoyed guiding the two characters throughout the season, adding that each plot thread helps enhance and progress Daniel and Sean' relationship. According to Phillips, the game "marks a more intimate and accomplished return for a studio keen to tackle tough issues with honest characters". VentureBeat's Dean Takahashi likewise applauded the character and the setting, calling them real and interesting, but remarked that Daniel has an annoying personality. Jones, however, believed that the road trip structure rendered most of the choices made within an episode meaningless, as Sean and Daniel will move on from a location and most characters would not be seen again. He was also critical of the main gameplay mechanic being effectively out of the player's hands.

Webster enjoyed the quiet scenes featured in the game and applauded Dontnod for finding a balance between drama and peaceful moments. He added that this pacing made the game "powerful without being exhausting". Dylan Burns from IGN agreed, adding that by slowing down the story to offer times that are more contemplative, the game manages to create beautiful and memorable moments. Takahashi, however, remarked that the slow moments can be so slow that they grind the game to a halt. Jackson noted that the dialogue was a marked improvement over the first game, though it still had the original's "almost embarrassing earnestness", while Meija praised the voice cast for making the most out of a script that can occasionally be "cheesy". Juba remarked the dialogue and the performance can be "stilted" at times, though it did not stop him from caring for Sean and Daniel. He further applauded Dontnod for successfully creating relatable characters. Jones believed that the sparse episodic release format was detrimental to the game's narrative pacing, remarking that much of the story happens off-screen, and it can be difficult for players to remain engaged.

Heather Wald of GamesRadar+ said Episode 1 was a "slow start", its well-constructed moments do not "hang together particularly well". In response to Episode 2, GameStar's Maurice Weber said the episode did not have enough momentum to delight him, while having dramatic story elements and difficult decisions in the right moments. He views the success of the game's predecessor as the game's biggest issue, as it does not consistently play in its class. Writing for Game Informer, Elise Favis said Episode 3 has an explosive conclusion but "painfully stereotypical" characters and poor pacing. GameSpot's Jess McDonell said Episode 4 has exceptional character development, but its storyline feels cliche and the villain "two-dimensional". JeuxVideo said the final episode is strong and while having at least as much contemplation as interactivity, swings between pure levity and the worst of humanity.

=== Sales ===
The PlayStation 4 version of Life is Strange 2 was the fifteenth bestselling retail game during its first week of release in Japan, with 4,471 physical copies being sold.

=== Accolades ===
| Year | Award | Category | Result | Ref. |
|---|---|---|---|---|
| 2018 | Ping Awards 2018 | Best Console Game | Nominated | |
| 2018 | Ping Awards 2018 | Best Graphics | Nominated | |
| 2018 | Ping Awards 2018 | Best Screenplay | Nominated | |
| 2018 | Ping Awards 2018 | Best Soundtrack | Nominated | |
| 2018 | Golden Joystick Awards | Best Audio Design | Nominated | |
| 2018 | The Game Awards 2018 | Best Narrative (Episode 1) | Nominated | |
| 2018 | The Game Awards 2018 | Games for Impact (Episode 1) | Nominated | |
| 2019 | New York Game Awards 2019 | Herman Melville Award for Best Writing (Episode 1) | Nominated | |
| 2019 | 15th British Academy Games Awards | Game Beyond Entertainment | Nominated | |
| 2019 | The Game Awards 2019 | Games for Impact | Nominated | |
| 2020 | New York Game Awards 2020 | Herman Melville Award for Best Writing | Nominated | |
| 2020 | Pégases Awards | Best Game | Nominated | |
| 2020 | Pégases Awards | Best Message-Bearer Game | Nominated | |
| 2020 | Pégases Awards | Best Sound Design | Nominated | |
| 2020 | Pégases Awards | Best Narrative Design | Won | |
| 2020 | Pégases Awards | Best Game Setting | Nominated | |
| 2020 | Pégases Awards | Best Character | Nominated | |
| 2020 | 16th British Academy Games Awards | Game Beyond Entertainment (Episodes 2-5) | Nominated | |
| 2020 | 16th British Academy Games Awards | Narrative (Episodes 2-5) | Nominated | |
| 2020 | 16th British Academy Games Awards | Performer in a Leading Role (Gonzalo Martin as "Sean Diaz") (Episodes 2-5) | Won | |
| 2020 | 16th British Academy Games Awards | Performer in a Supporting Role (Jolene Andersen as "Karen Reynolds") (Episodes 2-5) | Nominated | |
| 2020 | 16th British Academy Games Awards | Performer in a Supporting Role (Sarah Bartholomew as "Cassidy (Lucy Rose Jones)") (Episodes 2-5) | Nominated | |
| 2020 | The Games for Change Awards | Most Significant Impact | Nominated | |
| 2020 | Young Artists Academy | Voice acting Youth Artist (Roman Dean George) | Won | |

== Future ==
In a December 2019 interview, Dontnod's developers expressed interest in the future of the franchise while noting they would opt for new characters again, but explained that the rights belong to Square Enix and that decisions on the future of the franchise lay with them. Dontnod has since shifted their focus to develop their own intellectual properties in recent years according to a May 2021 interview. The series' next main entry, Life Is Strange: True Colors, was developed by Life Is Strange: Before the Storm developer Deck Nine and was released non-episodically in September 2021.
