= Timeline of PlayStation 3 SKUs =

The PlayStation 3 was originally launched in Japan on November 11, 2006, and in North America on November 17, 2006, with two SKUs: a 20 GB version and a 60 GB version. Both of these models included hardware backwards compatibility for PlayStation 2 games.

In January 2007, Sony announced that Europe's 60 GB version would exclude hardware backwards compatibility for PS2 titles and instead would provide compatibility through software emulation of the PS2's hardware. During the course of 2007, Sony announced several new PlayStation 3 SKUs and discontinued others. The new 40 GB, 80 GB and 160 GB PlayStation 3 models do not feature software emulation of PlayStation 2 hardware.

In August 2009, all previous models were discontinued, as the new PS3 Slims were released, in 120GB and 250GB editions, priced at $299 and $349, respectively. One year later, in August 2010, the 120GB version went out of production, to be replaced by a 160GB counterpart, which was also priced at $299.

== Timeline of SKUs ==
=== 2005 ===
- On May 16, 2005, at E3, Sony unveils a PlayStation 3 prototype with 2 HDMI ports, 6 USB ports and 3 Ethernet ports. This was never planned to be released.

=== 2006 ===
- On November 11, 2006, the PlayStation 3 was launched in Japan with both 20 GB and 60 GB models available.
- On November 17, 2006, the PlayStation 3 was launched in the United States and Canada, with both 20 GB and 60 GB models available.

=== 2007 ===
- On March 23, 2007, the PlayStation 3 was launched in Europe, Australia, the Middle East, Africa and New Zealand, with only a 60 GB model available.
- On April 11, 2007, Sony discontinued the 20 GB PlayStation 3 model in North America, citing "lack of consumer demand." It is widely speculated that the removal of the 20 GB model from the North American market was probably done in order to save manufacturing costs, as there is a difference in cost between the two aforementioned models of around $30.
- In June 2007, Sony Computer Entertainment Europe (SCEE) president David Reeves stated that there were no plans for the 80 GB PlayStation 3 model to be released in the PAL regions, and that a 20 GB PS3 model for PAL regions is "highly unlikely".
- On July 9, 2007, Sony announced the 80 GB PlayStation 3 model for North America, bundled with MotorStorm, to be available beginning August 6, 2007. In addition, Sony announced a price drop in which the 60 GB model would sell for US$499.
- On July 12, 2007, SCEE announced a Starter Pack bundle in Europe, including a second SIXAXIS controller and two first-party titles from a given selection, to sell at the same price as the standalone model. SCEE stated that there were no plans to introduce an 80 GB model or to drop the price for the 60 GB model in Europe. Around this time SCEE President David Reeves and Sony Computer Entertainment, Incorporated President Kaz Hirai clarified that the North American "price drop" was in fact a clearance sale intended to eliminate stock of the 60 GB unit, the production of which had actually been halted at the time of the price drop announcement. After all 60 GB units were sold, only the 80 GB unit would remain in stores in North America.
- On August 30, 2007, Sony Computer Entertainment America (SCEA) senior director of corporate communications Dave Karraker stated that it had sold and shipped all of its remaining North American 60 GB models to retailers, and that the company no longer has any inventory in its warehouses. According to spokeswoman Kimberly Otzman, retailer supplies for the North American 60 GB model would probably last through October 2007.
- On October 5, 2007, SCEE announced a 40 GB PlayStation 3 model for release on October 10, 2007, in the PAL territories of Europe, the Middle East, and Africa. In Australia and New Zealand, the 40 GB model was announced to be released on October 11, 2007, priced at A$699 for Australia and $799 for New Zealand.
- On October 9, 2007, it was announced that the 40 GB PlayStation 3 model was released in Japan on November 11, 2007, with the new Ceramic White color, in addition to the original Piano Black. Both models will retail for a recommended retail price of JP¥39,980. As with the SCEE announcement, an accompanying price drop was announced in Japan for older PlayStation 3 models, with both the 20 GB and 60 GB receiving a JP¥5,000 price reduction in the suggested retail price to JP¥44,980 and JP¥54,980, respectively.
- On October 10, 2007, the 40 GB PlayStation 3 model was released in Europe, the Middle East, and Africa. In Europe, the 40 GB model had a price of €399.99. The 60 GB Starter Pack received a reduction in price to €499 except in Britain, where the Starter Pack will be replaced by a £349 Value Pack with two first party games (Motorstorm and Resistance: Fall of Man) and one SIXAXIS controller (as opposed to two controllers in the £425 Starter Pack). Once stocks of 60 GB PAL region model are exhausted, the 40 GB model will be the only one available in the SCEE territories.
- On October 11, 2007, the 40 GB PlayStation 3 model was released in Australia and New Zealand.
- On October 18, 2007, SCEA announced that the 80 GB PlayStation 3 model would receive an immediate price reduction in North America to US$499/CAD$499.
- On November 2, 2007, the 40 GB model was released in North America for US$399/CAD$399, with Spider-Man 3 on Blu-ray as a pack-in.

=== 2008 ===
- On January 10, 2008, Sony discontinued the 20 GB and 60 GB models in Japan.
- On February 5, 2008, Sony announced the 40GB model in Satin Silver for Japan.
- On February 26, 2008, Sony announced at Destination PlayStation, during a retailers conference, the intended release of a 80GB Metal Gear Solid 4: Guns of the Patriots bundle PS3 that includes the 80GB PS3, a copy of MGS4, and a DualShock 3 controller. The package was released in North America only.
- On June 12, 2008, Sony released a 80GB PS3 Bundle which has Metal Gear Solid 4: Guns of the Patriots, along with a DualShock 3 controller, and a voucher for a free download of the PlayStation Network game, Pain. This bundle was only released in America, and sold out quickly at most retailers at their stores and online stores.
- On July 17, 2008, SCEE President David Reeves announced the 40GB PAL PS3 would be replaced with a new 80GB model. Sony is planning a simultaneous launch on August 27 across all PAL territories. SCEE President David Reeves said Sony would not lower the price of the 40GB model in the meanwhile.
- On August 20, 2008, Sony announced at the Leipzig Games Convention the intended release of a 160GB PS3 bundle which includes Uncharted: Drake's Fortune, along with a DualShock 3 controller, and a voucher for a free download of the PlayStation Network game, Pain.
- On September 20, 2008, Sony officially launched the PS3 in Malaysia with the 80GB model and no backward compatibility SKU.

=== 2009 ===
- In July 2009, in North America, Sony released a PS3 bundle with Metal Gear Solid 4: Guns of the Patriots, Killzone 2, and a DualShock 3 controller.
- On August 18, 2009, at Gamescom 2009, Sony announced starting the following day, the current 80GB PS3 model would have a price drop to $299. Sony also unveiled a recently rumored slimmer PS3. The new "PS3 Slim" would have 120GB, and would have all the same features as the current 80GB model. The new model is 32% smaller, 36% lighter and consumes 34% less power than the original. The PS3 Slim's retail price is $299 in North America, €299 in the EU, £249 in the UK and ¥29,980 in Japan. The PS3 Slim launched worldwide in the first week of September.

=== 2010 ===
- On July 29, 2010, the 160GB and 320GB PS3 slims were released in Japan, in charcoal black and classic white. These models supplant the previous 120GB and 250GB slim models. Other than larger HDD's, they are identical to the previous slim models.
- On August 17, 2010, the 160GB PS3 slim previously released in Japan was announced for North America during Gamescom 2010. The 320GB model was also announced to be headed for NA, but it would come with Move and Sports Champion. Because it is going to be a Move bundle, it would not be released until September 19 which is when Move launches. Currently, there is no way to purchase the 320GB model outside of the Move bundle, except in the United Kingdom where it is available to purchase with GT5 for £284.99. Because of the 160GB model, Sony has discontinued manufacturing of the 120GB model. The 160GB retails for US$299, and the 320GB for $399. Feature-wise, these new models are identical to the previous slim models.
- On October 29, 2010, Sony announced that they would be distributing standalone models of the 160 and 320 GB consoles to retailers.

=== 2012 ===
- On September 19, 2012, Sony announced that a new slim PS3 redesign called Super Slim was intended for release in late 2012 with a 12GB flash memory model and a 500GB HDD model.

=== 2013 ===
- In January 2013 Sony released in America a limited edition Classic White Super Slim PS3 which included 500GB Hard Drive, a 1-year PS+ subscription and a white Dualshock controller, priced at $299.
- On March 12, 2013, Sony released in America another limited edition called God of War Ascension Legacy Bundle, which included a limited edition Garnet Red PS3 Super Slim, a Garnet Red Dualshock controller, the God of War Saga game and the God of War Ascension game.

=== 2014 ===
- In January 2014 Sony released another limited edition in America, the PS3 Azurite Blue Super Slim model, previously only available on Europe.

== Withdrawal from sale ==
In 2017, it was announced that the final remaining model in production in Japan, the 500GB Super Slim, was to end production, in order to focus resources on the PlayStation 4.
