= Supercross Circuit =

1999 video game

- Developer: Idol Minds
- Publisher: 989 Sports
- Platform: PlayStation
- Release: NA: November 9, 1999
- Genres: Racing, Sports
- Modes: Single-player, multiplayer

Supercross Circuit is a 1999 racing video game developed by Idol Minds and published by 989 Sports for the PlayStation. It was released only in North America.

== Reception ==
Reception

Aggregate score
Aggregator	Score
GameRankings	71%

Review scores
Publication	Score
AllGame	4/5
Electronic Gaming Monthly	7/10
EP Daily	7/10
Game Informer	3.5/10
GameFan	77% (Note: In GameFan's viewpoint of the game, one critic gave it 75, and the other 79.)
GamePro	3.5/5
GameSpot	7.7/10
IGN	5.8/10
Next Generation	3/5
Official U.S. PlayStation Magazine	3.5/5

The game received above-average reviews according to the review aggregation website GameRankings. Doug Trueman of NextGen said, "There's more than enough in this title to engross even the most cynical racing fan until the first 128-bit motocross game is released."
