= My Street =

2003 video game

- PAL region cover art
- Developer: Idol Minds
- Publisher: Sony Computer Entertainment
- Platform: PlayStation 2
- Release: NA: March 12, 2003; EU: October 31, 2003
- Genre: Party
- Modes: Single-player, multiplayer

My Street is a 2003 party video game developed by Idol Minds and published by Sony Computer Entertainment for the PlayStation 2. There are seven minigames and it has very similar gameplay to other party games such as the Mario Party series.

== Gameplay ==
My Street features three modes for the player to choose from, which are story, play, and netplay. The story mode has the player explore the game's neighborhood setting and aiding the children that populate it in order to save the neighborhood and complete the story. The play mode allows players to directly play the minigames against AI. The netplay mode is the game's multiplayer mode, allowing players to play the minigames online through the PlayStation 2's Network Play.

The game has a selection of seven minigames: Volleyball, RC Racing, Marbles, Dodgeball, Chemistry, Chicken Herding, and Lawnmowers. An eighth gamemode, Corn Field Maze, was announced at the game's reveal in E3 2002 but was cut before release. The game modes are accessible by visiting the different children that populate the game's neighborhood setting. The story mode requires the player to unlock the game modes in a specific order by recovering items for those characters.

The player character can either be selected from preset characters or customized through selecting different body parts, hairstyles, and clothing.

== Plot ==
In My Street, the player is put in control of the "new kid," whose role in the game is to beat the bully before August 24—the first day of school.

== Reception ==
Reception

Aggregate score
Aggregator	Score
Metacritic	46/100

Review scores
Publication	Score
AllGame	2.5/5
Electronic Gaming Monthly	4.5/10
EP Daily	6/10
Eurogamer	4/10
GameRevolution	D
GameSpot	4.5/10
GameSpy	1/5
GameZone	6.7/10
IGN	6.3/10
Official U.S. PlayStation Magazine	3/5
X-Play	2/5

My Street received "generally unfavorable reviews" according to the review aggregation website Metacritic. GamePro said of the game, "While it's noble that someone has tried to give a party game a plot, the kiddie treatment here is both disturbing and annoying, and the games themselves aren't all that fun; the addition of PS2 online play does not redeem it. If My Street is your street, move." (Note: GamePro gave the game 3.5/5 for graphics, two 2.5/5 scores for sound and control, and 2/5 for fun factor.)
