= The Awesome Adventures of Captain Spirit =

2018 video game

- Developer: Dontnod Entertainment
- Publisher: Square Enix
- Directors: Raoul Barbet; Michel Koch
- Producer: Luc Baghadoust
- Designer: Kevin Poupard
- Programmer: Nicolas Sérouart
- Artist: Michel Koch
- Writers: Christian Divine; Jean-Luc Cano
- Series: Life Is Strange
- Engine: Unreal Engine 4
- Platforms: PlayStation 4; Windows; Xbox One
- Release: 25 June 2018
- Genre: Adventure
- Mode: Single-player

The Awesome Adventures of Captain Spirit is a 2018 adventure game in the Life Is Strange series developed by Dontnod Entertainment and published by Square Enix. It was released in June 2018 for PlayStation 4, Windows, and Xbox One as an introduction to and demo for Life Is Strange 2. The plot follows Chris Eriksen, a young boy who creates the superhero alter ego Captain Spirit to deal with the loss of his mother. Square Enix External Studios worked with Dontnod for the development. The game received generally favourable reviews, praising the narrative, main character, and script, but criticising the game mechanics and aspects of the writing.

== Gameplay and setting ==
The player assumes the role of a young boy named Chris Eriksen. It takes place in Beaver Creek, Oregon, where Chris lives with his father, Charles, who is struggling with the death of Chris's mother. One Saturday morning, Chris creates the superhero alter ego Captain Spirit and projects his imagination onto reality. He imagines his various chores as supervillains to be defeated. After an argument with his father, Chris falls from his treehouse, but mysteriously levitates instead of hitting the ground, and spots two boys watching from afar (who appear in Life Is Strange 2).

His costume is customisable, while the environment can be interacted with and contains quests like treasure hunting and exploring an imagined planet. Dialogue trees are used to respond to non-player characters. The choices that the player makes in The Awesome Adventures of Captain Spirit affect some parts of Life Is Strange 2, in which Chris also makes an appearance.

== Development and release ==
According to developer Dontnod Entertainment, the game fulfilled their wish to expand the Life Is Strange universe, which arose during the production of Life Is Strange 2, for which it serves as a demo. Co-directors Raoul Barbet and Michel Koch collaborated with writers Christian Divine and Jean-Luc Cano to create the story and characters. They researched the location with reference to what the protagonist's father could bear the expense of, including the nature of his work. Dontnod used the game to experiment with mechanics from the first Life Is Strange game; dialogue trees were improved to allow responses while moving. Using the Unreal Engine 4, Dontnod developed a new facial and physics animation system and designed original assets. It was influenced by the Japanese anime series Sailor Moon and Saint Seiya, according to Barbet. Sufjan Stevens' song, "Death with Dignity" from the Carrie & Lowell album, is used to represent the theme of loss. The game was revealed at Microsoft's E3 2018 presentation for release on 26 June, but was rather launched on 25 June. A version localised and dubbed in Japanese was released on 6 February 2020.

== Reception ==
Reception

Aggregate score
Aggregator	Score
Metacritic	(PC) 79/100 (PS4) 75/100 (XONE) 78/100

Review scores
Publication	Score
Destructoid	7/10
Easy Allies	8.0/10
Game Informer	8.5/10
GameRevolution	3/5
GameSpot	8/10
GamesRadar+	4.5/5
IGN	7/10
VideoGamer.com	6/10

The Awesome Adventures of Captain Spirit received generally favourable reviews, according to Metacritic. Destructoid's Brett Makedonski was most struck by the narrative, which also left him wanting more. Joe Juba of Game Informer concurred and appreciated the parable between Chris' imagination and its real life counterpart. Its explicit connections to Life Is Strange 2 excited him. Michael Leri, writing for Game Revolution, enjoyed playing as Captain Spirit, noting that the character's function to contrast the mundane "livens up interactions". James O'Connor at GameSpot thought that Chris succeeded "as a sympathetic figure", while also praising the cutscenes for being visually inventive. He saw the script as "tight" and called the storytelling "smart". GamesRadar+'s Andy Hartup commended that it is free-to-play, agreed with O'Connor about the script's succinctness, and said it contained charm and "genuine human drama". Writing for IGN, Louisa Blatt found the father-son dynamic to be emotionally satisfying, never once growing bored with the story. She also declared the setting "the most beautiful scenery I’ve ever seen in a Life is Strange game". Adam Cook of VideoGamer.com wrote in his verdict, "As a teaser for Life is Strange 2, Captain Spirit does its job", citing its length as what it did well.

Conversely, Makedonski disliked that it ended on a "gratuitous" cliffhanger. Juba thought the weakest segments were the ones using traditional adventure game mechanics. Leri disparaged the writing for its "extreme" tonal shifts and "mediocre" dialogue. O'Connor criticised the characters for being clichéd. Hartup accused the game of being too short. Blatt was usually annoyed with the primary mechanic and wrote that the quests fell short of challenging her. Cook questioned the subtlety of the writing.

=== Awards ===
The game was nominated for "Game, Franchise Adventure" at the NAVGTR Awards and the "Matthew Crump Cultural Innovation Award" at the SXSW Gaming Awards.
