= Life Is Strange: Reunion =

2026 video game

- Developer: Deck Nine
- Publisher: Square Enix
- Directors: Jonathan Zimmerman; Christopher Sica
- Producers: Stephan Frost; Jason Yu
- Designers: Christopher Sica; Andres Ortiz Suarez
- Programmers: Todd Bolinger; Damien Kochanek
- Artist: Andrew Weatherl
- Writer: Jonathan Zimmerman
- Composer: Tessa Rose Jackson
- Series: Life Is Strange
- Engine: Unreal Engine 5
- Platforms: PlayStation 5; Windows; Xbox Series X/S
- Release: March 26, 2026
- Genre: Adventure
- Mode: Single-player

Life Is Strange: Reunion is a 2026 adventure game in the Life Is Strange series, developed by Deck Nine and published by Square Enix. It serves as a sequel to Life Is Strange: Double Exposure (2024) and follows the return of Chloe Price, who reunites with Max Caulfield at Caledon University. Chloe seeks help coping with memories of an alternate life and death she did not experience, as a destructive inferno threatens to engulf the campus. Max and Chloe are the playable characters, possessing the "rewind" ability to manipulate time and the "backtalk" skill to confront opponents and access restricted areas, respectively.

Deck Nine was reported to be working on a sequel to Double Exposure in 2025, and Reunion was officially announced in January 2026. The game was released for PlayStation 5, Windows, and Xbox Series X/S on March 26, 2026, to mixed reviews from critics.

== Gameplay ==
For the first time in the series, Life Is Strange: Reunion features two playable characters: returning protagonists Max Caulfield and Chloe Price. Max's "rewind" power from the first Life Is Strange (2015) returns, allowing her to undo actions as well as travel to the past via polaroid photographs. The power is now more flexible, meaning it can be used at any time in the game, though it is limited in range to a few minutes, and Max may only rewind at places to points in time she was already there. Chloe's "backtalk" ability returns from Life Is Strange: Before the Storm (2017), allowing her to confront opponents via conversations, as well as gain access to restricted areas in the game that Max is not able to reach.

== Plot ==
In September 2024, nine months after a storm swept through Caledon University in Lakeport, Vermont, (Note: As depicted in Life Is Strange: Double Exposure (2024)) Max Caulfield returns to Caledon from a weekend trip, only to find the campus engulfed in flames. Max attempts to help the students escape, but is unable to save her friend Moses Murphy. Using a polaroid photo taken three days earlier, Max uses her "rewind" power to jump back into the past and calls off her trip, determined to prevent the fire from happening.

Max informs Moses of the future events, prompting them to investigate Max's abilities. Max also learns from her friends Amanda Thomas and Vinh Lang that Caledon's current president, Owen Teller, has been pushing to expand the university's campus, while former Caledon professor Lucas Colmenero is spearheading a protest movement. Owen has also been campaigning for the demolition of an abandoned building that once belonged to the Abraxas secret society. Max goes to investigate the building, where she encounters one of her students, Loretta Rice, who is conducting her own investigation. The two manage to escape the building and stop an early demolition attempt, but Max is then greeted by her best friend Chloe Price, now a touring manager for the band Drugstore Makeup, who has travelled across the country to find her.

The next morning, Chloe explains that she has been experiencing visions where she sees a woman, revealed to be Max's former friend Safi Llewellyn-Fayyad. Max realizes that in her efforts to merge the timelines to save Safi, she also merged the two realities where she chose to either sacrifice Chloe or Arcadia Bay from eleven years ago, (Note: As depicted in Life Is Strange (2015)) causing both Chloe and the town to coexist in the current timeline. Max and Chloe work together to investigate the eventual fire as well as the cause behind Chloe's visions. While working with Moses, Chloe experiences another vision and is temporarily pulled into another plane of existence, which Moses dubs "the Overlight". Max confronts Safi, who has returned to Caledon and is using her shapeshifting power to stay undetected, and learns that Safi has been experiencing the same visions as Chloe's.

Max and Chloe infiltrate an Abraxas party held at the old building, where they discover a secret room in the basement containing numerous photos. A masked individual attempts to recover a crate from the room, though they are forced to run after being discovered. Max and Chloe open the crate and find the skeletal remains of a person. The next day, Max's power evolves, allowing her to project the memories of the photos, revealing that in 1995, a Lakeport teenager snuck into an Abraxas party and committed suicide during a drug-induced hallucination. Upon further investigation, Max learns that Safi's mother Yasmin Fayyad, who was present at the party, made the decision to hide the teenager's body, while the masked individual, later revealed to be Vinh, is covering up the evidence to protect Yasmin's reputation without her knowledge. Chloe learns that a Lakeport local, Ren Landry, is the son of the dead teenager, and he is harboring a grudge against Caledon for hiding the truth about his father's death. At this point, Max and Chloe have to identify Vinh and Ren, respectively, as the eventual culprits in order to stop them from starting a fire.

At the observatory, Safi confronts Chloe and attempts to persuade her to leave instead of helping Max. She pulls Chloe into the Overlight, and contemplates staying here to resolve the paradox of their existences. Chloe can attempt to convince Safi to leave with her. As Chloe returns from the Overlight, she finds the observatory has been set ablaze, regardless of whether Vinh and/or Ren were stopped. Max returns to Caledon and attempts to save the students, before going to the observatory. Max suggests using her original polaroid selfie to go back in time once more, but both Chloe and Moses claim that the photo was destroyed during the fire. An explosion causes Chloe to fall from the rooftop, but Max exhausts her power and narrowly saves Chloe. Depending on their actions, some characters either survive or die in the fire.

In the aftermath, Max decides to travel on the road with Chloe and Drugstore Makeup. Sometime later, Moses sends Chloe a letter alongside Max's polaroid selfie. In the letter, Moses tells Chloe that he is worried about what might happen if Max decides to use her photo to travel back in time in another attempt to prevent the fires entirely, abandoning Chloe in the current timeline; and he asks Chloe to decide whether to give the photo to Max or destroy it to protect Max from her own actions.

- If Chloe destroys the photo, she vows to fight for her future with Max, and they both visit Arcadia Bay together.
- If Max did not manage to save everyone during the fire and Chloe gives her the photo, Max later uses the photo to rewind, leaving Chloe behind in this timeline.
- If Max managed to save everyone during the fire and Chloe gives her the photo, Max destroys the photo herself, having made peace with her past.

== Development ==
In 2025, developer Deck Nine was reported to be working on a sequel to Life Is Strange: Double Exposure. IGN reported "disgruntled leaks from developers" regarding the game suggested a troubled development. When Reunion was announced, Hannah Telle and Rhianna DeVries were revealed to be respectively reprising their roles as Max Caulfield and Chloe Price. Ashly Burch, Chloe's original voice actress, mentioned that she was not asked to return and learned about Reunion as it was publicly announced, though expressed her appreciation for Max and Chloe. Jonathan Zimmerman returns as writer, having previously worked on Before the Storm, and also serves as a co-game director.

=== Music ===
Music supervisor Ben Sumner called Life Is Strange: Reunion's soundtrack "an ode to all of the Life Is Strange games" with the inclusion of familiar tracks from previous series entries. As the game reunites Max and Chloe for the first time since Life Is Strange (2015), Sumner wanted to "nod towards all the powerful musical moments that have come before" while concluding their story. Two original songs were written for Life Is Strange: Reunion: "Embers in the Sky" by Holly Humberstone and "Let It Happen, Let It Go" by Etta Marcus. Marcus felt "incredibly full circle" in being able to contribute to "the soundtrack for the last chapter of such a special story that I grew up with".

== Release ==
Life Is Strange: Reunion was released for PlayStation 5, Windows, and Xbox Series X/S on March 26, 2026. The Pan-European Game Information (PEGI) ratings board leaked first information for Life Is Strange: Reunion including a synopsis on January 7, 2026. Some publications expressed concern about the details leaked and discontent with the potential narrative; one commented that being given a PEGI rating signified the game being relatively close to launch. On January 15, Square Enix announced the official reveal of a game in the series would happen on January 20. Some publications connected this game with the leak of Reunion, while others did not and speculated on the details of the game. Mixed reaction to Double Exposure was noted, and Deck Nine addressed this on social media ahead of the game reveal. Prior to the reveal, Xbox Wire published their article on the game early. The announcement of Reunion established it as a direct sequel to Double Exposure, confirmed Max and Chloe as the playable characters, and gave its release date. Some commentators questioned the creative integrity of the return to Max and Chloe.

== Reception ==
Reception

Aggregate scores
Aggregator	Score
Metacritic	(PC) 73/100 (Note: Based on 26 critic reviews) (PS5) 71/100 (Note: Based on 58 critic reviews) (XSXS) 80/100 (Note: Based on 9 critic reviews)
OpenCritic	68% recommend

Review scores
Publication	Score
4Players	75/100
Game Informer	6/10
GamesRadar+	2.5/5
HobbyConsolas	80/100
IGN	8/10
Push Square	5/10
RPGFan	87/100
TechRadar	2/5
The Guardian	4/5

Life Is Strange: Reunion received "mixed or average" reviews for the Windows and PlayStation 5 versions while the Xbox Series X version received "generally favorable" reviews, according to review aggregator website Metacritic. Fellow review aggregator OpenCritic assessed that the game received fair approval, being recommended by 68% of critics. Reviewers generally praised the game for reuniting Max and Chloe, its emotional tone, and aspects of its mystery and presentation, while criticism commonly focused on uneven storytelling, limited consequences for player choices, underdeveloped supporting characters, simple gameplay, and technical issues.

In CG Magazine, Neil Bolt treated Reunion as a strong sendoff for Max and Chloe, arguing that it successfully reconnects the series' older and newer storylines while giving the player meaningful influence over the outcome. He regarded the central mystery as tightly constructed, thought the dual-protagonist approach worked well, and came away satisfied by the sense of closure. His reservations were mostly technical, pointing to texture pop-in and other visual rough edges, and he also noted that some unresolved elements from Double Exposure are only lightly addressed. RPGFan's Matt Wardell praised the reunion of Max and Chloe, the game's warm visuals and music, its quieter emotional tone, and dialogue he found effective. His criticisms focused on its linear structure, minimal challenge, sparse puzzle design, and exploration that he felt added little mechanically. David Rodríguez of HobbyConsolas praised the game's emotional treatment of Max and Chloe, their chemistry, the ending, the soundtrack, and a mystery he found engaging for most of its runtime. His criticisms focused on frequent technical issues, light and unambitious gameplay, choices he found somewhat too clear-cut, and story adjustments that he felt only worked if the player accepted the narrative baggage carried over from Double Exposure. Similarly, on the German edition of GamePro, Dennis Müller praised the emotional reunion between Max and Chloe, the strength of their interactions, the weight of many decisions, and the story's ability to stay engaging even if it did not match the original. He criticized its heavy reuse of locations from Double Exposure, very basic and familiar gameplay, and technical blemishes such as pop-in, texture flicker, and rough shadows; he also wrote that the story depends too much on prior games and may alienate players unhappy with how it revises earlier outcomes. Sören Wetterau on 4Players responded positively to the game, finding Max and Chloe's dynamic convincing and emotionally affecting, and also singling out the graphics, voice acting, soundtrack, and overall tone as strengths. He described the central mystery as only moderately interesting, and felt that some narrative points were left underexplained, the mechanics were extremely slight, and the presentation was undermined by minor technical blemishes. Kim Snaith from GameSpew lauded Max and Chloe's reunion, the chapter structure, the visuals, voice acting, and the mix of exploration, puzzle-solving, and evidence gathering. Her main criticisms were that the Caledon- and Abraxas-centered story was less engaging than the leads themselves, that Chloe was not as central as she had hoped, and that Max and Chloe did not always feel convincingly older than in the original game.

GamesRadar+ critic Oscar Taylor-Kent was mixed on the game, praising the return of Chloe, Max's rewind ability, stronger environments than Double Exposure, some enjoyable dialogue, and an opening mystery that initially drew him in. However, he criticized the game for becoming too preoccupied with past continuity and power lore, saying the character drama was pushed aside, the two narrative threads did not always mesh well, and Chloe's backtalk sections felt weaker than before. His final verdict criticized the game more heavily for what he saw as muddled and uneven storytelling, underused supporting characters, and technical or budget-related roughness. Checkpoint Gaming's Charlie Kelly was strongly negative, arguing that the game relies too heavily on nostalgia for Max and Chloe without justifying their return with a worthwhile new story. Kelly found the rewind mechanic and some of its puzzle uses effective, but described the mystery as full of plot holes and lacking payoff, the supporting cast as thinly drawn, and the writing, technical state, and handling of the series' themes and internal rules as major weaknesses.

=== Sales ===
Square Enix revealed on June 29, 2026, that Life Is Strange: Reunion "exceeded expectations" of its sales.
