= Warrior's Lair =

- Developers: Idol Minds, San Diego Studio
- Publisher: Sony Computer Entertainment
- Platforms: PlayStation 3, PlayStation Vita
- Release: Canceled
- Genre: Role-playing

Warrior's Lair was an action role-playing video game set in a medieval fantasy setting being developed for the PlayStation 3 and PlayStation Vita. The game was presented June 2011 at the Electronic Entertainment Expo (E3) where it demonstrated Sony Computer Entertainment's new handheld games console, and the ability to transfer active games between the two consoles.

The game was being co-developed by Sony Computer Entertainment and Idol Minds, but Sony announced its cancellation in July 2013. The PlayStation 3 and PlayStation Vita versions were expected to be sold together as a combined package.

== Gameplay ==
Warrior's Lair was an action role-playing game player from a perspective corrected view of an isometric viewpoint, the game-engine includes simulation of destructible environments and ragdoll physics.

== Development ==
Warrior's Lair's working title was Ruin. The game would utilise cloud storage to store game data, so that gameplay can be transferred almost seamlessly between connected devices.

A social aspect has been introduced to the game through standard methods including competitive and cooperative play, trading and chat, as well as the integrated ability to post progress on Facebook and Twitter, and by another mechanism whereby players can create and modify their own dungeons (called 'Lairs') where high value items are stored which enhance the player's in game skills, the 'Lairs' as also available to other players as questable locations.
