= Hannah Telle =

American actress (born 1987)

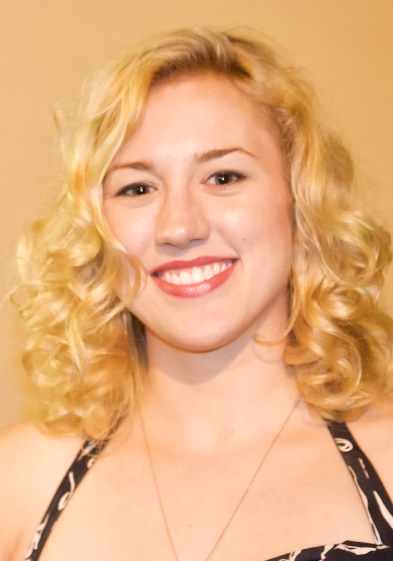
- Telle in 2011
- Born: Hannah Rebecca Telle; September 18, 1987 (age 39)
- Education: University of Southern California (BS)
- Occupations: Actress; singer
- Years active: 2008–present

Hannah Rebecca Telle (born September 18, 1987) is an American actress and singer. Her roles include Max Caulfield in the Life Is Strange series.

== Early life ==
Hannah Rebecca Telle was born on September 18, 1987, to Don and Kim Telle. She grew up in Shelby, North Carolina, and has a younger brother. She took an interest in acting at the age of six and joined community theatre. She did her early schooling from North Carolina School of the Arts and started attending the University of Southern California in 2006 for acting and filmmaking but dropped out in 2009. She is bipolar and has struggled with depression and anxiety throughout her life.

== Career ==
Telle submitted roles on actorsaccess.com and secured parts in indie films. She had a minor role in an episode of iCarly (2012) as a harp player. She starred in the film Two Pints Lighter (2013) as Lucy; Asbury Park Press described her performance as "charming". She was cast in Square Enix's Murdered: Soul Suspect (2014) as Rose Campbell / Iris Campbell for motion capture.

In July 2014, Telle was asked to audition for the video game Life Is Strange (2015) based on her role in Murdered; she was cast as Max Caulfield at the Blindlight studio. She also voiced other characters including Courtney Wagner. Edge's Jen Simpkins described her casting as "inspired". Telle was surprised by the game's success and its community, and expressed interest in reprising the role, including in Life is Strange: Before the Storm despite the ongoing voice actor strike. She reprised the role in December of 2017 in the downloadable content bonus episode "Farewell".

Telle released her debut alternative album Hollow Glow in 2016. In 2018, she starred as Max in the horror film Flesh & Blood and as Kate in I'd Kill for You. She released the albums Walking Away from the Dream in 2019 and Waking Up to Tomorrow in 2023. She reprised her role as Max Caulfield in Life Is Strange: Double Exposure (2024), which she considered the "highlight of [her] acting career". Her performance was praised, and she was nominated for Best Performance at the Game Awards 2024 and the 14th New York Game Awards.

== Personal life ==
Telle lives in Los Angeles. She returned to the University of Southern California and graduated with a bachelor's degree in neuroscience in 2022. She is a vegetarian and has four cats.

== Works ==
=== Television ===
Year	Title	Role	Notes	Ref.
2012	iCarly	Harp Player	Episode: "iApril Fools"	
2012	Days of Our Lives	Waitress	2 episodes	
2013	Fixer	Dana	Miniseries	
2014	Unusual Suspects	Diann Anthony	Episode: "Death Comes Calling"	
2021	Made for Love	Customer's Wife	Episode: "Let's Meet"	

=== Film ===
Year	Title	Role	Notes	Ref.
2008	Sex and the USA	Ella	Debut	
2010	The Day Abby Went Into David's Backyard	Abby		
2010	Novelties	Shery		
2010	6 Women	Sylvia		
2011	Over & Out	Taylor Larkin		
2011	30 Square Miles	Kennedy		
2012	Leonor Greyl: The Artist	The Make-Up Artist	Short	
2012	Franchise	Franchise	Short	
2012	Paste	Mags	Short	
2013	Firefiles	Jennifer	Short	
2014	Two Pints Lighter	Lucy		
2014	Photobomb	Leah		
2015	Childhood Mammaries	Tweety	Short	
2015	Turning Home	Ashley		
2016	Flesh & Blood	Max	Short	
2017	Ray & Remora: Don't Shoot Me Down	Remora	Short	
2018	I'd Kill for You	Kate		
2020	Gautreaux	Agnes	Short	
2020	Six Matches	Fox	Short	

=== Video games ===
List of voice performances in video games
Year	Title	Role
2014	Murdered: Soul Suspect	Rose Campbell / Iris Campbell
2015	Life Is Strange	Max Caulfield / Courtney Wagner
2018	Life Is Strange: Before the Storm – "Farewell"	Max Caulfield
2024	Life Is Strange: Double Exposure	Max Caulfield
2026	Life Is Strange: Reunion	Max Caulfield

== Discography ==
Title	Album details
Hollow Glow	Released: September 21, 2016

== Awards and nominations ==
Year	Ceremony	Category	Result	Title	Ref.
2024	The Game Awards 2024	Best Performance	Nominated	Life Is Strange: Double Exposure	
2025	New York Game Awards	Great White Way Award for Best Acting in a Game	Nominated	Life Is Strange: Double Exposure	
