= Life Is Strange: Double Exposure =

2024 video game

- Developer: Deck Nine (Note: Switch version developed by Engine Software)
- Publisher: Square Enix
- Director: Jonathan Stauder
- Producer: T. Julian Bell
- Designer: Christopher Sica
- Programmer: Ben Tarr
- Artist: Andrew Weatherl
- Writers: Felice Kuan; Deandra Fallon Warrick
- Composers: Tessa Rose Jackson; Chloe Moriondo; dodie
- Series: Life Is Strange
- Engine: Unreal Engine 5
- Platforms: PlayStation 5; Windows; Xbox Series X/S; Nintendo Switch
- Release: PS5, Win, XSX/S; 29 October 2024; Nintendo Switch; 19 November 2024 (Note: Digital release, physical version in 2025)
- Genre: Adventure
- Mode: Single-player

Life Is Strange: Double Exposure is a 2024 adventure game in the Life Is Strange series, developed by Deck Nine and published by Square Enix. It serves as a direct sequel to Life Is Strange (2015) and focuses on an older Max Caulfield who, upon discovering new supernatural abilities that allow her to travel between two timelines, finds herself investigating a murder case involving her new best friend.

Double Exposure was released for PlayStation 5, Windows, and Xbox Series X/S on October 29, 2024, and Nintendo Switch on November 19. The game received mixed reviews from critics. A sequel, Life Is Strange: Reunion, was released in March 2026.

== Plot ==
In December 2023, Max Caulfield has relocated to Lakeport, Vermont, where she is working as a photographer-in-residence at Caledon University. Her decision to never use her time-rewinding powers again stems from the consequences she faced in her past. (Note: As depicted in Life Is Strange (2015)) On December 4, after spending time with her friends Safiya "Safi" Llewellyn-Fayyad and Moses Murphy, Max is devastated to find Safi dead from a gunshot wound. Max isolates herself in grief until she discovers a new ability: the power to "pulse" into an alternate timeline where Safi is still alive. This ability soon evolves, allowing Max to travel between these parallel timelines at will. In the "Living" timeline, Safi's car is vandalized, indicating she might still be in danger, prompting Max to investigate and try to uncover the killer in the "Dead" timeline.

During her investigation, Max meets several residents of the university, including Yasmin Fayyad, the university president and Safi's mother; Amanda Thomas, a waitress at the local bar, Snapping Turtle; Vinh Lang, Yasmin's administrative assistant and leader of the Abraxas secret society; Gwen Hunter, a professor specializing in Creative Non-Fiction; Lucas Colmenero, head of the Literature Department; and students Loretta Rice, Reggie Kagan, and Diamond Washington. In the Living timeline, Max finds Gwen and Lucas implicated in separate incidents they did not commit, while in the Dead timeline, Reggie claims to have seen a doppelganger of himself. Moses admits to stealing Safi's camera from the crime scene, which Max retrieves and hides from Detective Vince Alderman. This leads to Max's discovery of a new power: "entangling" objects between timelines. The camera reveals a photo of Max pointing a gun at Safi, causing Moses to believe Max is the killer.

Max's attempt to use her rewind power on the photo triggers a vision of a future storm in Caledon, similar to the one in Arcadia Bay, with Safi begging Max to shoot her to end the chaos. Max reveals her powers to Moses, regaining his trust. They encounter an apparition of Alderman, and when the real Alderman arrives, the two versions of him interact and vanish from existence. In the Living timeline, Max learns that Gwen canceled Safi's book deal because it focused on Maya Okada, a former student and Safi's best friend who committed suicide after Lucas plagiarized her work. Vinh and Safi failed to defend Maya, leading to her death. Back home, Max confronts an intruder, who turns out to be Safi with shapeshifting powers, having impersonated Gwen and Lucas to sabotage their careers for their involvement in Maya's death and canceling her book deal.

Max and Safi agree to expose Lucas' plagiarism at a Krampus-themed party using their powers. Although successful, Lucas tells Safi that Yasmin ordered the cancellation of her book, and that Gwen was only following her demands, leading Safi to confront Yasmin, who claims to have done this for her daughter's safety. Safi's powers spiral out of control, unleashing the storm from Max's vision. Max uses her rewind power to take them back to December 4th, retaining their memories but bringing the storm with them. Safi pleads with Max to kill her to end it, but Max chooses to face the storm together. Within the storm, they find themselves in a timeline merging Caledon and Max's memories of Arcadia Bay that was created by the mixture of their powers, where Max uses her polaroid camera to separate Safi from her friends, whose minds are merged with Safi.

Max and Safi return to the real world, where the Living and Dead timelines have combined and the storm has stopped. Safi decides to leave Caledon to seek others with powers, asking Max to wait for her return and help her harness her abilities, though Max worries that Safi's plan could affect their and other people's lives. Max must choose whether to accept or decline Safi's request. Max then reveals her powers to her friends at Caledon, and vows to stay and help them navigate their future together.

In a post-credits scene, Diamond exhibits excessive nose-bleeding and encounters Safi, who offers to help her seek answers.

== Development ==
In June 2024, during the Xbox Games Showcase, Square Enix revealed their latest installment in the Life Is Strange series, which serves as a direct sequel to Life Is Strange (2015), titled Life Is Strange: Double Exposure, developed by Deck Nine. Hannah Telle reprised her role as Max.

The game offers players the option to choose an ending organically, avoiding the decision of making one of the first game's endings canon. The game's directors emphasized respecting the original endings while introducing a fresh narrative that reflects Max's past challenges. They highlighted that the player's decisions, which are influenced by Max's thoughts, journal, text messages, and interactions, determine the outcome. The game introduces a new ability for Max, allowing her to shift between parallel timelines, providing her with a new perspective and outlook on events.

== Release ==
Life Is Strange: Double Exposure was released for PlayStation 5, Windows, and Xbox Series X/S on October 29, 2024. The Nintendo Switch version, developed by Engine Software was released digitally on November 19 and via retail on January 28, 2025. Players who pre-ordered the Ultimate Edition of the game received early access to the first two chapters, starting from October 15, 2024. The Deluxe Edition adds some small cosmetics and a mission related to a missing cat. The Ultimate Edition early access raised concerns about spoilers. (Note: Multiple references:)

Don't Nod, the developer of two previous Life Is Strange games, delayed their new game, Lost Records: Bloom & Rage into 2025 to avoid competing against Double Exposure.

== Reception ==
Reception

Aggregate score
Aggregator	Score
Metacritic	(PS5) 73/100 (Note: Based on 64 critic reviews) (XBXS) 74/100 (Note: Based on 21 critic reviews) (PC) 75/100 (Note: Based on 26 critic reviews)

Review scores
Publication	Score
4Players	7.5/10
Destructoid	8/10
Famitsu	32/40
GamesRadar+	3.5/5
IGN	9/10
PC Gamer (US)	72/100
PC Games (DE)	8/10
Push Square	6/10
The Games Machine (Italy)	8.8/10

=== Critical reception ===
Life Is Strange: Double Exposure received "mixed or average" reviews from critics for the PlayStation 5 and Xbox Series X/S versions, while the PC version received "generally favorable" reviews, according to review aggregator website Metacritic. In Japan, four critics from Famitsu gave the game a total score of 32 out of 40.

4Players opined that the game retained likeable characters, sarcastic humor, detailed locations, and nostalgic feel, but mentioned that it did not match the original's impact and there were "some rough edges" in the story and technical performance. Destructoid saw it as "a satisfying sequel that ties in the events of its prequel well", praising its captivating story, character development, and nostalgic appeal, but criticizing some predictable plot twists and a few one-dimensional characters. GamesRadar+ found the mystery intriguing, the cast of characters diverse and the facial animations visually expressive. The criticisms focused on the limited time with characters and dual timelines that hinder emotional investment. IGN thought the game lived up to the original's standards and was an improvement "on nearly every aspect from the previous games", lauding the character development and handling of serious topics with nuanced writing. The Games Machine stated that its captivating story had believable characters and surprising twists, cleverly blended mystery and science fiction, and offered great graphics and sound, while criticizing its simplistic puzzles and walking simulator feel.

PC Gamer appreciated its mystery aspect, Max's new powers, and the exploration of serious topics with nuanced writing, but questioned the rehashing of old narrative groundwork, inconsistent sound mixing, and underdeveloped characters due to the dual timelines, ultimately calling it "a somewhat unnecessary-feeling sequel that still manages to tell a compelling story, if not a little messy and underbaked." Technical issues like slow-loading textures, overlapping dialogues, and other graphical glitches were also bothersome to PC Games, which cited the story, characters, animations and soundtrack as high quality but the puzzles as simple and the game world as small. The game was disappointing for Push Square, which voiced criticism for what it described as audio issues, lack of emotional resonance, overreliance on the supernatural, and underdeveloped setting and story compared to previous games, but liked the visuals, Max's return, the early episodes and some of the characters.

=== Analyst coverage ===
In March 2025, Japanese analyst Hideki Yasuda reported that the sales of Life Is Strange: Double Exposure were a "large loss" for Square Enix.

=== Accolades ===
Year	Ceremony	Category	Result	Ref.
2024	The Game Awards 2024	Best Performance (Hannah Telle)	Nominated	
2024	The Game Awards 2024	Games for Impact	Nominated	
2025	New York Game Awards	Herman Melville Award for Best Writing in a Game	Nominated	
2025	New York Game Awards	Tin Pan Alley Award for Best Music in a Game	Nominated	
2025	New York Game Awards	Great White Way Award for Best Acting in a Game (Hannah Telle)	Nominated	
2025	25th Game Developers Choice Awards	Best Narrative	Honorable mention	
2025	25th Game Developers Choice Awards	Social Impact	Won	
2025	36th GLAAD Media Awards	Outstanding Video Game	Won	
2025	21st British Academy Games Awards	Game Beyond Entertainment	Longlisted	
2025	21st British Academy Games Awards	Narrative	Longlisted	
