= Life Is Strange =

Adventure video game series

- Genre: Adventure
- Developers: Dontnod Entertainment; Deck Nine
- Publisher: Square Enix
- First release: Life Is Strange; 30 January 2015
- Latest release: Life Is Strange: Reunion; 26 March 2026

Life Is Strange is a series of adventure games published by Square Enix's External Studios. Created by Dontnod Entertainment, the series debuted with the eponymous first installment, which was released in five episodes throughout 2015. It was followed by a prequel, Life Is Strange: Before the Storm, which was developed by Deck Nine and released in three episodes throughout 2017, with the downloadable content (DLC) Farewell released in early 2018. The sequel Life Is Strange 2 and its spin-off The Awesome Adventures of Captain Spirit were developed by Dontnod and released between 2018 and 2019. A fourth installment, Life Is Strange: True Colors, was developed by Deck Nine and released in September 2021, along with the DLC Wavelengths later that month. Additionally, a remastered collection of the original game and its prequel was released in February 2022. The fifth and sixth installments, Life Is Strange: Double Exposure, released in October 2024, and Life Is Strange: Reunion, released in March 2026, were also developed by Deck Nine.

The series has spawned a multimedia franchise which includes a comic series set after one of the original game's possible endings, a second comic series set after the ending of True Colors, three novels and two in-universe books. A television series adaptation is in production for Amazon Prime Video with Charlie Covell serving as the showrunner.

== History ==
Following the critical and commercial failure of their 2013 action-adventure game Remember Me, French game developer Dontnod Entertainment was forced to restructure and reinvent itself. Dontnod CEO Oskar Guilbert explained "Before, what we wanted to do was make big games with large teams and long production cycles... So we had to change that, do something smaller with smaller teams. We didn't want to do just a small game; we also wanted to bring something new to the market."

Life Is Strange was conceived around the rewind mechanic, a concept which had already been briefly explored in Remember Me. Life Is Strange's protagonist Max Caulfield was created with the ability to rewind time to supplement this mechanism. Development began in April 2013 with a team of 15 people, with further people added as the collaboration with Square Enix began. Before signing with Square Enix, Dontnod imagined Life Is Strange as a full-length video game similar to Remember Me that Dontnod would self-publish; however, Square Enix realized it would be more successful as an episodic title, both for creative reasons, financial restrictions and marketing purposes. This allowed them to tell the story at a slower pace.

Development began under the working title What If, before being retitled to avoid confusion with the film of the same name. It was Dontnod's second title with a female protagonist, and most prospective publishers were unwilling to publish a game unless it had a male protagonist. Guilbert also challenged the idea at the start. Dontnod creative director Jean-Maxime Moris explained that Square Enix was the only publisher with no intention to change this. "Square [Enix] is basically the only publisher who didn't want to change anything about the game... we had other publishers telling us to make it a male lead character, and Square didn't even question that once."

The Pacific Northwest was chosen for the setting to convey a nostalgic and autumnal feel, with the team eventually settling on Oregon as the location of the fictional town of Arcadia Bay. It was decided early on that most of the budget be spent on the writing and voice actors. The story was originally written in French by Jean-Luc Cano, and converted into a game script by the game's co-directors and design team. This was then handed over to Christian Divine and Cano to be finetuned in English. Recording sessions were done in Los Angeles, California, with the French developer brought in via Skype. The textures were hand painted, adapted to achieve what art director Michel Koch called "impressionistic rendering". Sources of inspiration include the visual novel Danganronpa, in terms of balancing gameplay and story, and the novel The Catcher in the Rye, whose protagonist Holden Caulfield shares a surname with Max, the lead character. For the sake of realism, the supernatural elements were designed as a metaphor for the characters' inner conflict, and experts were consulted to tackle difficult subjects such as teen suicide.

Following the release and success of the first Life is Strange, publisher Square Enix chose American developer Deck Nine to develop a prequel game focusing on the life of Chloe Price, while the Dontnod team began developing a direct sequel. Development on the project began in 2016 with assistance from Square Enix' London Studios. Ashly Burch, who voiced Chloe in Life Is Strange, was replaced by Rhianna DeVries due to the SAG-AFTRA strike. However, Burch and Hannah Telle, who voiced Max Caulfield, both reprised their roles for the bonus episode Farewell. The project went under various working titles during development. The writers researched memoirs and psychology to understand Chloe's grieving process, and the script for the game was over 1,500 pages, written by lead writer Zak Garriss and a writers' room. Prior to its official announcement, images had leaked online indicating that a prequel to Life Is Strange was in development. Square Enix revealed Life Is Strange: Before the Storm on 11 June during Microsoft's E3 2017 presentation.

Dontnod had decided early on that prospective follow-ups to Life Is Strange would feature new characters and locations to the original, with the developers feeling that Max and Chloe's story had run its course over the first two games. Game co-director Raoul Barbet explained that "It's a question we asked ourselves at the beginning. Is it Max and Chloe, Arcadia Bay? No, it's about everyday characters, relatable characters with stories you can involve yourself in, because it reflects your own experiences. With some supernatural stuff on the top." Michel Koch added that "everyone loved Max, Chloe, Rachel... But [their story]...it's done. We have nothing more to tell. We don't want to. Other people will do it, and it's okay... But for us, we have nothing more to do. Take [them] and do whatever you want."

Development on Life Is Strange 2 began in early 2016 as the first game shipped its physical edition. Michel Koch and Raoul Barbet returned to direct the sequel, with Christian Divine and Jean-Luc Cano reprising their roles as co-writers. The concept was influenced by the photography of Mike Brodie, who would freighthop across the United States and take pictures of drifters. The game is structured like a road movie, inspired by the film Into the Wild and novella Of Mice and Men. Dontnod conducted field research on the West Coast of the United States, meeting people and taking pictures there. The two primary themes of the game are education and brotherhood. Using the Unreal Engine 4, they upgraded the animation system, physics, and shaders. According to Dontnod, one of the biggest challenges of development was the artificial intelligence of the character Daniel.

Deck Nine began work on True Colors after completing Before the Storm in 2017. A common theme of the Life Is Strange series has been based on characters with a type of super-human ability, though not like superheroes, that the developers can then provide "meditations on real experiences that regular people go through", according to Felice Kuan, senior writer at Deck Nine. For True Colors, they had determined early on they wanted their protagonist to be based on a power around empathy, not only to be able to sense what others were experiencing but to be vulnerable herself and would be able to grow past this as the story progressed, "giving her a path to greater self-acceptance and greater trust in her own abilities" according to Kuan. This led to creating the story around Alex losing her brother early in the game as a driver for her to explore her empathy powers and reveal more about her past as she uses them. Erika Mori portrays Alex through full performance capture, which Mori said was "instrumental in successfully creating this game about empathy because it allowed us to get really high-fidelity facial expressions that were organically connected to whatever was going on with my voice and body in a particular scene."

In a 2019 interview, Dontnod Entertainment, the developer of the first two mainline games in the series, expressed interest in the future of the franchise while noting they would opt for new characters again, but explained that the rights belong to Square Enix and that decisions on the future of the franchise lay with them. Dontnod has shifted their focus to develop their own intellectual properties in recent years. With the announcement of Life Is Strange: True Colors, Eurogamer reported that Dontnod's time with the franchise was over and that the Life Is Strange series has been transferred to Deck Nine. In April 2024, IGN reported about a toxic workplace culture at Deck Nine, which came to light early last year while they were working on the next Life Is Strange game.

== Gameplay ==
The Life Is Strange games are adventures played from a third-person view. The player can examine and interact with objects, which enables puzzle solving in the form of fetch quests and making changes to the environment. The player can explore locations and communicate with non-player characters. Dialogue exchanges feature branching options in conversation. In some instances, choices in dialogue will alter and affect the story through short- or long-term consequences. For each one of the choices, something good in the short term could turn out worse later.

Each individual game in the series features a central mechanic unique to that game. In Life Is Strange, the player (as Max) has access to a "rewind" ability, which allows them to rewind time and alter the course of events. The rewind mechanic is accessible in conversation, allowing players to navigate branching dialogue options and change the outcome of a conversation to be beneficial to the player. Items picked up are kept in the inventory after a rewind, and changes in the environment remain in place. In Before the Storm, Chloe has a "backtalk" mechanic that allows her to persuade and intimidate other characters through conversation, with either positive or negative effects. In Life Is Strange 2, the player (as Sean) must guide Daniel, who has the power of telekinesis, through various moral and ethical choices that will influence how he will use his powers to help or hinder the player as the game progresses. In True Colors, the player (as Alex) has psychic empathy powers that allow her to read and manipulate emotions, which she perceives as colorful auras, to physically see how others feel around her at the cost of being "infected" by their emotions. Some of the non-player characters will have more intense auras indicating trauma or hardship they may be going through. When Alex interacts with them, this creates a "nova" that appears to transform the world around Alex and the character to reflect elements of this trauma, giving the opportunity for the player to figure out what caused their emotions and to opt to guide Alex in helping to comfort the character.

== Games ==
Release timeline
2015	Life Is Strange
2016
2017	Life Is Strange: Before the Storm
2018	The Awesome Adventures of Captain Spirit
2018	Life Is Strange 2 (Episode 1)
2019	Life Is Strange 2 (Episodes 2–5)
2020
2021	Life Is Strange: True Colors
2022	Life Is Strange Remastered Collection
2023
2024	Life Is Strange: Double Exposure
2025
2026	Life Is Strange: Reunion

=== Life Is Strange (2015) ===
Maxine "Max" Caulfield returns to her hometown of Arcadia Bay, Oregon, where she witnesses childhood friend Chloe Price being shot by Nathan Prescott. The incident triggers Max's abilities to rewind time, allowing her to save Chloe from Nathan. As the two friends begin to reconnect, Max has visions of a violent storm approaching Arcadia Bay, and uses her newfound powers to help Chloe track down her missing friend Rachel Amber.

The game was released in five episodes across 2015 for Xbox One, PlayStation 4, Xbox 360, PlayStation 3, and Microsoft Windows, with iOS, Android and MacOS, Linux versions released later on. Episode 1: Chrysalis was released on 30 January, Episode 2: Out of Time on 24 March, Episode 3: Chaos Theory on 19 May, Episode 4: Dark Room on 28 July, and Episode 5: Polarized on 20 October. Retail editions of the complete season for Xbox One, PS4 and PC were released on 22 January 2016 in Europe, and 19 January 2016 in North America.

=== Life Is Strange: Before the Storm (2017) ===
Three years before the events of Life Is Strange, Chloe Price is struggling with the death of her father when she meets and befriends popular student Rachel Amber. As the two develop an intense relationship, they uncover long-buried secrets within the Amber family that lead Rachel on a search for her birth mother.

The game was released in three episodes across 2017 for Xbox One, PlayStation 4, and Microsoft Windows, with iOS, Android and MacOS, Linux versions released later on. Episode 1: Awake was released on 31 August, Episode 2: Brave New World on 19 October, and Episode 3: Hell Is Empty on 20 December. The Deluxe Edition included the DLC bonus episode Farewell, released on 6 March 2018. In it, Max struggles to tell Chloe of her imminent move to Seattle. To distract herself, she lets Chloe take them on a pirate treasure hunt in search of "treasure" buried by Chloe's father, William. Their day is ultimately cut short by the news of William's death.

=== The Awesome Adventures of Captain Spirit (2018) ===
Christopher "Chris" Eriksen fashions himself into the superhero Captain Spirit to help his alcoholic father set up the house for Christmas. He imagines his various chores as supervillains to be defeated - including his arch-nemesis Mantroid, an embodiment of his feelings surrounding the death of his mother in a hit-and-run. After an argument with his father, Chris falls from his treehouse, but mysteriously levitates instead of hitting the ground, and spots two boys watching from afar (who appear in Life Is Strange 2).

The Awesome Adventures of Captain Spirit was released on 25 June 2018 as a free demo for Life Is Strange 2, and takes place during the events of that game's second episode.

=== Life Is Strange 2 (2018–2019) ===
Sean Diaz and his younger brother Daniel flee their home in Seattle following their father's death at the hands of a police officer. An explosion damages the environment and following the incident, Daniel develops telekinetic abilities. Now fugitives, the brothers embark on a cross-country road trip down the American West Coast toward their father's homeland of Puerto Lobos, Mexico, as Sean struggles to step up as a father figure for Daniel and guide him through the moral implications of his new-found powers. As they meet friends and foes along the road, including their estranged mother, the decisions Sean makes shape who Daniel will become, and eventually the ultimate outcome of their journey.

The game was released in five episodes for Xbox One, PlayStation 4, and Microsoft Windows, and later for MacOS, Linux and Nintendo Switch. Episode 1: Roads was released on 27 September 2018. Episode 2: Rules was released on 24 January 2019. Episode 3: Wastelands was released on 9 May 2019. Episode 4: Faith was released on 22 August 2019. Episode 5: Wolves was released on 3 December 2019. Retail editions of the complete season were released on 3 December 2019 in Europe, and 4 February 2020 in North America.

=== Life Is Strange: True Colors (2021) ===
Alex Chen hides her "curse": the psychic power of Empathy, the ability to absorb the emotions of others. When her brother dies in a so-called accident, Alex must embrace her power to find the truth.

The game was released on 10 September 2021 for Stadia, Xbox One, Series X/S, PlayStation 4, PlayStation 5 and Microsoft Windows. Announced as the third mainline game of the series, it was released while still being structured in five chapters. It released on Nintendo Switch on 7 December that year. The Deluxe Edition includes the DLC story Wavelengths.

=== Life Is Strange Remastered Collection (2022) ===
Life Is Strange Remastered Collection is a collection of Life Is Strange and Life Is Strange: Before the Storm remastered by Deck Nine. (Note: Additional work by Black Tower Studios. Switch version by Dragon's Lake Entertainment.) It was released for PlayStation 4, Xbox One, Microsoft Windows, Google Stadia in February 2022 and released digitally and retail for Nintendo Switch in September 2022 as Life Is Strange Arcadia Bay Collection. The collection includes all previously released content with refinements including character animation using facial motion capture. It is available as part of the Ultimate Edition bundle of Life Is Strange: True Colors. The Windows version received "mixed or average reviews" with a score of 70 based on 7 reviews on Metacritic.

The collection was announced alongside Life Is Strange: True Colors on 21 March 2021. On 15 June, it was announced to then release on 30 September 2021, on PlayStation 4, Xbox One, Microsoft Windows, Google Stadia (PlayStation 5 and Xbox Series X/S backwards-compatible). The Nintendo Switch version was announced during the Nintendo Direct E3 2021 presentation, then for release later that year. On 11 August, the collection was delayed to early 2022, alongside an announcement of the Life Is Strange: True Colors downloadable content, Wavelengths, releasing on 30 September. On 24 September, it was said to release on 1 February 2022. On 21 January 2022, it was announced that the Switch version was delayed to later in 2022 and on 16 August, the version was said to release on 27 September 2022 as Life Is Strange Arcadia Bay Collection.

=== Life Is Strange: Double Exposure (2024) ===
During an Xbox Showcase presentation in June 2024, Deck Nine and Square Enix announced the next entry in the franchise titled Life Is Strange: Double Exposure. It was released on October 29 for Windows, PlayStation 5 and Xbox Series X/S, to be followed by a Switch release at a later date. The game features the original game's protagonist, Max Caulfield, as an adult, solving a murder mystery split across two timelines. It is set in the US state of Vermont at the fictional "Caledon University".

=== Life Is Strange: Reunion (2026) ===
In 2025, developer Deck Nine was reported to be working on a sequel to Double Exposure. It follows Chloe reuniting with Max at Caledon University, as Chloe is "haunted by nightmares and impossible memories" and needs Max's help. The Pan-European Game Information ratings board leaked first information for Life Is Strange: Reunion including a synopsis on January 7, 2026. On January 20, the game was revealed and later released on March 26, 2026.

== Other media ==
=== Comics ===
A four-part miniseries was announced in May 2018, which became an ongoing series published by Titan Comics beginning in November 2018. Following the events of Life Is Strange's "Sacrifice Arcadia Bay" ending, the comic follows Max and Chloe as they come to terms with the aftermath of the storm and letting Arcadia Bay be destroyed. The series is written by Emma Vieceli, with interior and cover art by Claudia Leonardi, and colours by Andrea Izzo. The series act concluded with the release of Life Is Strange: Settling Dust in March 2022, but the series will continue according to Newsarama.

In July 2023, a new series, entitled Life Is Strange: Forget-Me-Not, was announced for publication in December 2023. The series, written by Zoe Thorogood, again drawn by Leonardi and colored by Izzo, will follow Alex Chen and Steph Gingrich after the events of True Colors.

Original comic series
Issue	Release date	Collection
1	14 November 2018	Life Is Strange Vol. 1: Dust; RELEASED: 22 May 2019; ISBN 9781785866456
2	19 December 2018	Life Is Strange Vol. 1: Dust; RELEASED: 22 May 2019; ISBN 9781785866456
3	16 January 2019	Life Is Strange Vol. 1: Dust; RELEASED: 22 May 2019; ISBN 9781785866456
4	20 February 2019	Life Is Strange Vol. 1: Dust; RELEASED: 22 May 2019; ISBN 9781785866456
5	29 May 2019	Life Is Strange Vol. 2: Waves; RELEASED: 20 November 2019; ISBN 9781787730885
6	26 June 2019	Life Is Strange Vol. 2: Waves; RELEASED: 20 November 2019; ISBN 9781787730885
7	24 July 2019	Life Is Strange Vol. 2: Waves; RELEASED: 20 November 2019; ISBN 9781787730885
8	21 August 2019	Life Is Strange Vol. 2: Waves; RELEASED: 20 November 2019; ISBN 9781787730885
9	16 October 2019	Life Is Strange Vol. 3: Strings; RELEASED: 8 April 2020; ISBN 9781787732070
10	13 November 2019	Life Is Strange Vol. 3: Strings; RELEASED: 8 April 2020; ISBN 9781787732070
11	11 December 2019	Life Is Strange Vol. 3: Strings; RELEASED: 8 April 2020; ISBN 9781787732070
12	15 January 2020	Life Is Strange Vol. 3: Strings; RELEASED: 8 April 2020; ISBN 9781787732070
Partners in Time
2.1	14 October 2020	Life Is Strange – Volume 4: Partners in Time: Tracks; RELEASED: 7 April 2021; ISBN 9781787734739
2.2	18 November 2020	Life Is Strange – Volume 4: Partners in Time: Tracks; RELEASED: 7 April 2021; ISBN 9781787734739
2.3	16 December 2020	Life Is Strange – Volume 4: Partners in Time: Tracks; RELEASED: 7 April 2021; ISBN 9781787734739
2.4	20 January 2021	Life Is Strange – Volume 4: Partners in Time: Tracks; RELEASED: 7 April 2021; ISBN 9781787734739
3.1	7 July 2021	Life Is Strange – Volume 5: Coming Home; RELEASED: 3 November 2021; ISBN 9781787734746
3.2	1 September 2021	Life Is Strange – Volume 5: Coming Home; RELEASED: 3 November 2021; ISBN 9781787734746
4.1	13 October 2021	Life Is Strange – Volume 6: Settling Dust; RELEASED: 7 June 2022; ISBN 9781787734753
4.2	10 November 2021	Life Is Strange – Volume 6: Settling Dust; RELEASED: 7 June 2022; ISBN 9781787734753
4.3	29 December 2021	Life Is Strange – Volume 6: Settling Dust; RELEASED: 7 June 2022; ISBN 9781787734753
4.4	9 March 2022	Life Is Strange – Volume 6: Settling Dust; RELEASED: 7 June 2022; ISBN 9781787734753

Life Is Strange: Forget-Me-Not
Issue	Release date	Collection
1	20 December 2023	Life Is Strange: Forget-Me-Not; RELEASED: 10 December 2024; ISBN 1787739791
2	27 March 2024	Life Is Strange: Forget-Me-Not; RELEASED: 10 December 2024; ISBN 1787739791
3	29 May 2024	Life Is Strange: Forget-Me-Not; RELEASED: 10 December 2024; ISBN 1787739791
4	14 August 2024	Life Is Strange: Forget-Me-Not; RELEASED: 10 December 2024; ISBN 1787739791

=== Books ===
In September 2018, Square Enix partnered with Titan Publishing on Welcome to Blackwell Academy, a 160-page in-universe tie-in book exploring the Life Is Strange universe through the eyes of a student guide to Blackwell Academy and Arcadia Bay. It features notes, sketches, and photographs from various characters from the first Life Is Strange and Before the Storm. It was written by Matt Forbeck and released on 9 October 2018.

In July 2022, the first novel was announced, titled Steph's Story, which focuses on the character Steph Gingrich, who was first introduced in Before the Storm. It was written by Rosiee Thor and released on 21 March 2023. In October 2023, a second novel was announced, titled Heatwaves, which features Alex Chen and Steph after the events of True Colors. It was written by Brittney Morris and released on 30 July 2024.

On July 30, 2025, two new books were announced and set to be released the following year. A second in-universe tie-in book, titled Welcome to Caledon University, features notes, sketches, and photographs from various characters from Double Exposure and Reunion. It was written by Chris Farnell and released on 14 April 2026. A third novel, titled Out of Focus, focuses on Chloe Price as the band manager of Drugstore Makeup. It was written by Rosiee Thor and released on 1 September 2026.

=== Television series ===
In July 2016, Legendary Digital Studios and Square Enix announced that they had begun developing an adaptation of Life Is Strange, with dj2 Entertainment acquiring the television rights. At the time of the announcement, they were meeting with potential writers for the series adaptation, which would be set in Arcadia Bay. In 2017, the television rights were sold to Hulu. In August 2021, it was announced that Shawn Mendes would oversee the music for the series with Anonymous Content joining the series to co-produce.

In September 2025, Amazon MGM Studios acquired the television rights and gave a series order to an adaptation of the first Life Is Strange game for Amazon Prime Video, with Charlie Covell serving as showrunner, writer, and executive producer while Story Kitchen and LuckyChap Entertainment joined the series to co-produce. In March 2026, Tatum Grace Hopkins and Maisy Stella were cast as Max and Chloe, respectively. Karyn Kusama was announced as the director for the first two episodes, and will executive produce alongside Jen Roskind, Dmitri M. Johnson, Michael Lawrence Goldberg, and Timothy I. Stevenson.

== Reception ==
The series' reception has been generally positive, with all games receiving "generally favorable" reviews according to aggregator Metacritic. Michel Koch has described the series and the approach to its characters as an anthology series similar to TV series like True Detective or American Horror Story in 2015.

Life Is Strange received generally favorable reviews, with a Metacritic score of 85/100 on PlayStation 4 and Xbox One. Some criticized issues with the game's lip-syncing and use of outdated slang, but most lauded the character development and time travel component. Eurogamer called it "one of the best interactive story games of this generation" and Hardcore Gamer said it was the sleeper hit of 2015. Life Is Strange received over 75 Game of the Year awards and listings. The game is considered one of the greatest video games of all time.

Life Is Strange: Before the Storm was met with generally favorable reviews, with a Metacritic score of 77/100. Critics praised the characters, themes, and story, but criticized plot holes, the main relationship, and the impact of players' decisions near the end of the game.

Life Is Strange 2 was met with generally favorable reviews, with a Metacritic score of 78/100. Critics praised the story, the relationship between Sean and Daniel and the choice-based gameplay while reception of the portrayed political themes were divergent. The sparse episodic release schedule and the dialogue were criticized.

Life Is Strange: True Colors received "generally favorable reviews" with a Metacritic score of 81/100. IGN praised the setting of Haven Springs, writing that the game has "arguably the best setting in any Life is Strange game to date". Game Informer liked the writing of the game, stating, "True Colors' writing is so strong that it didn't need a supernatural ability to tell this story." Justin Clark of GameSpot enjoyed the story's themes, feeling that some of game's interactions were "powerful" and "emotionally resonant".
