= Pain (video game) =

2007 video game

- Developer: Idol Minds
- Publisher: Sony Computer Entertainment
- Composer: Peter McConnell
- Engine: Havok (physics)
- Platform: PlayStation 3
- Release: NA: November 29, 2007; PAL: March 20, 2008
- Genre: Action
- Modes: Single-player, multiplayer

Pain (stylized as PAIN) is an action video game developed by Idol Minds and published by Sony Computer Entertainment for the PlayStation 3. It was released as a downloadable title on the PlayStation Store in North America on November 29, 2007 and in the PAL region on March 20, 2008. The game was released physically in June 2009 in Europe, Australia and the United Kingdom. By 2009, Pain had become the all-time most downloaded digital game on the PlayStation Store.

== Gameplay ==
In Pain, the player attempts to damage a ragdoll character and the environment as much as possible by flinging themselves from a rubber-band slingshot, utilizing the Havok physics engine. Each character has distinctive poses and phrases, can move by "ooching" and can grab things to throw or hang from. Replay videos can be watched, and can be edited and uploaded to YouTube or the PlayStation 3's hard disk drive.

=== Characters ===
Besides the regular characters available, Santa Claus, Katsuaki Kato (Famitsu editor-in-chief), Elvira, Flavor Flav, George Takei, Andy Dick and David Hasselhoff were remade in the game. PlayStation characters Buzz, Daxter and Fat Princess are also available.

=== Levels ===
The original game download included only one level, "Downtown", a sandbox level with three unlockable environments. "Downtown" offered the modes 'Fun With Explosives', 'Spank The Monkey', 'Mime Toss', and 'Bowling'.

On September 18, 2008, the "Amusement Park" level was added with one unlockable environment and four available modes including 'Hot N' Cold' and 'Trauma'. On November 13, the "Touchmounds Movie Studio" level was released which included a new mode named 'Cratetastic'.

On May 13, 2009, the "Sore Spots" DLC was added and included two environments: "Morningwood High School" and "Area 69". This level added new modes named 'PAINalympics' and 'Mad Science!'. On August 13, the developers added "Stiffstonian Museum" to the game.

In 2010, the "Alpine Ski Slope" level was added to promote the release of an update that enabled game functionalities for the PlayStation Move. On November 24, the game was updated with the final DLC level, named "Hurt Falls", which was released for free and sponsored by Axe. It included the mode Fun With Explosives.

Additionally, two Pain themed pinball minigames were made available for download, which include elements of "Amusement Park" and "Area 69".

== Release ==
In June 2009, SCEE announced that the game would get a physical release through Blu-ray disc format. It launched in Europe on June 24, 2009, in Australia on June 25, 2009 and in the United Kingdom on June 26, 2009. The Blu-ray version includes the original game as well as several other levels and features released as downloadable content for the PSN version.

=== Announced free-to-play version ===
On October 25, 2013, Sony announced that Pain would be "reinvented" as a free-to-play game developed by Argentinian studio QB9 Entertainment. Footage of the project was showcased at the 2013 Brazil Game Show.

== Reception ==
=== PAIN ===
PAIN

Aggregate score
Aggregator	Score
Metacritic	71/100

Review scores
Publication	Score
1Up.com	B
The A.V. Club	C
Edge	6/10
Eurogamer	8/10
GameDaily	6/10
GameSpot	7.5/10
GameZone	7/10
IGN	6.8/10
PlayStation Official Magazine – UK	7/10
Push Square	8/10

PAIN received "mixed or average reviews" according to the review aggregation website Metacritic. GameSpot praised the game for its "great use of Havok physics engine" and "smartly sophomoric sense of humor," but criticized it for having just one level. IGN said, "One level, two characters, no online multiplayer and no way to share crazy clips sucks. However, there are a ton of trophies to unlock."

The game was referenced in the PlayStation 5 launch title Astro's Playroom, a celebration of the PlayStation brand.

=== Amusement Park ===
PAIN: Amusement Park

Aggregate score
Aggregator	Score
Metacritic	73/100

Review scores
Publication	Score
GameSpot	5/10
GameZone	7.3/10
IGN	7/10

PAIN: Amusement Park received "mixed or average reviews" according to Metacritic.

== See also ==
- List of downloadable PlayStation games
