= Deck Nine =

American video game developer

Idol Minds, LLC
- Trade name: Deck Nine (2017–present)
- Type: Private
- Industry: Video games
- Founded: April 1, 1997; 29 years ago in Boulder, Colorado, US
- Founders: Mark Lyons; Scott Atkins
- Headquarters: Westminster, Colorado, US
- Key people: Mark Lyons (president, CTO); Jeff Litchford (COO)
- Website: deckninegames.com

Idol Minds, LLC (doing business as Deck Nine or Deck Nine Games since 2017) is an American video game developer based in Westminster, Colorado. The studio was founded in April 1997 by Mark Lyons and Scott Atkins and developed games exclusively for PlayStation consoles until 2012. Subsequently, it shifted to mobile games before rebranding as "Deck Nine" in May 2017 to develop narrative-driven games.

== History ==
Idol Minds was founded by programmer Mark Lyons and artist Scott Atkins. They had previously worked for Sony Interactive Studios America in San Diego and, after Lyons moved to Colorado with his family, established Idol Minds on April 1, 1997, in Boulder, Colorado. It developed multiple sports games under 989 Studios until the 2000s. Party game My Street and action-adventure Neopets: The Darkest Faerie followed. In November 2007, the studio released ragdoll physics-based game Pain, which was among the most-downloaded games on PlayStation Network of 2008. In October 2009, Idol Minds reportedly made 26 of its 46 employees redundant. One source attributed the layoffs to budget cuts by Pain publisher Sony Computer Entertainment (SCE), which was Idol Minds' only source of funding.

At E3 2011, SCE announced Ruin, a "Diablo-style action role-playing game" developed by Idol Minds and SCE's San Diego Studio. After the game was renamed Warrior's Lair, Idol Minds was taken off the project in April 2012 (Warrior's Lair was canceled by Sony in July 2013). Later in 2012, Idol Minds shifted its focus onto mobile free-to-play games. In August 2015, Idol Minds launched a crowdfunding campaign via Kickstarter for photo safari game Shutterbug, seeking US$400,000 in funding (The project was canceled after raising $2,973 in ten days).

On May 31, 2017, Idol Minds announced that it would focus on narrative-driven games with brand and trade name "Deck Nine", an homage to 1983 video game Planetfall. It built toolset StoryForge for creating these and was developing a project in a "critically acclaimed franchise". During E3 2017, publisher Square Enix announced Deck Nine was developing Life Is Strange: Before the Storm, a prequel to 2015's Life Is Strange. The game's first episode was released in August 2017, the second in October and the third and final episode in December. The Farewell DLC episode was released in March 2018. In September 2018, Deck Nine announced it was working with Square Enix on a new project.

In March 2021, Square Enix announced Life Is Strange: True Colors and the Life Is Strange Remastered Collection (containing the original Life Is Strange and Before the Storm), both remastered by Deck Nine, with Life Is Strange: True Colors being released in September 2021 along with the Wavelengths DLC episode later that same month. The Colorado Office of Economic Development and International Trade (OEDIT) supported Deck Nine with $2.5 million job-growth incentive tax credits and via the Colorado Office of Film, Television and Media (COFTM), the production of True Colors with $150,000 phased film incentives in 2017 and 2018. In December 2021, Telltale Games announced to be co-developing The Expanse: A Telltale Series with Deck Nine during The Game Awards 2021. After being delayed from a simultaneous September 2021 launch, Life Is Strange Remastered Collection was released in February 2022.

In May 2023, Deck Nine reportedly laid off 30 employees. The Expanse: A Telltale Series released its first episode in July 2023 with new episodes coming bi-weekly through the fifth and final episode in September. The Archangel DLC episode was released in November. In February 2024, Deck Nine announced that it would lay off 20% of its staff. In April 2024, IGN reported on a toxic workplace culture based on employee testimonials and suspected Nazi symbolism found during development of a new Life Is Strange game by staff during development. Deck Nine responded to IGN's inquiry emphasizing the studio's diverse team, employee welfare and collaborative development. In June 2024, Square Enix announced Life Is Strange: Double Exposure as a direct sequel to the original Life Is Strange, which was released in October 2024. In December 2024, Deck Nine laid off an undisclosed number of employees. In January 2026, Square Enix and Deck Nine announced Life Is Strange: Reunion, which was released in March 2026. In August 2026, COO Jeff Litchford announced he was leaving the company to launch Second Unit Games, alongside Deck Nine founder Mark Lyons as the CTO.

== Games developed ==
=== As Idol Minds ===
Year	Title	Platform(s)	Publisher(s)	Ref.
1998	Cool Boarders 3	PlayStation	989 Studios	
1998	Rally Cross 2	PlayStation	989 Studios	
1999	Cool Boarders 4	PlayStation	989 Studios	
1999	Supercross Circuit	PlayStation	989 Sports	
2000	Cool Boarders 2001	PlayStation, PlayStation 2	Sony Computer Entertainment	
2003	My Street	PlayStation 2	Sony Computer Entertainment	
2005	Neopets: The Darkest Faerie	PlayStation 2	Sony Computer Entertainment	
2007	Pain	PlayStation 3	Sony Computer Entertainment	
2008	Madagascar: Escape 2 Africa	PlayStation 2	Activision	
2012	Ratchet & Clank Collection	PlayStation 3, PlayStation Vita	Sony Computer Entertainment	
2012	Linked Together	iOS	Idol Minds	
2013	Ratchet: Deadlocked (HD Edition)	PlayStation 3	Sony Computer Entertainment	
2013	Phrazzle	iOS, Android	GameFly	
2014	Tales of Honor: The Secret Fleet	iOS, Android	Mobage	
2014	Qube Kingdom	iOS, Android	Mobage	

=== As Deck Nine ===
Year	Title	Platform(s)	Publisher(s)
2017	Life Is Strange: Before the Storm	Android, iOS, Linux, macOS, Microsoft Windows, PlayStation 4, Xbox One	Square Enix
2021	Life Is Strange: True Colors	Microsoft Windows, Nintendo Switch, PlayStation 4, PlayStation 5, Stadia, Xbox One, Xbox Series X/S	Square Enix
2022	Life Is Strange Remastered Collection	Microsoft Windows, Nintendo Switch, PlayStation 4, Stadia, Xbox One	Square Enix
2023	The Expanse: A Telltale Series	Microsoft Windows, Nintendo Switch, PlayStation 4, PlayStation 5, Xbox One, Xbox Series X/S	Telltale Games
2024	Life Is Strange: Double Exposure	Microsoft Windows, Nintendo Switch, PlayStation 5, Xbox Series X/S	Square Enix
2026	Life Is Strange: Reunion	Microsoft Windows, PlayStation 5, Xbox Series X/S	Square Enix
