= Life Is Strange: Before the Storm =

2017 graphic adventure video game

- Developer: Deck Nine
- Publisher: Square Enix (Note: Feral Interactive developed and published the Linux and macOS versions.)
- Directors: Webb Pickersgill; Chris Floyd
- Producers: Zoe Brown; David Lawrence Hein
- Designer: William Beacham
- Programmers: Danielle Cheah; Mark Lyons
- Artist: Andrew Weatherl
- Writer: Zak Garriss
- Composer: Daughter
- Series: Life Is Strange
- Engine: Unity
- Platforms: PlayStation 4; Windows; Xbox One; Linux; macOS; Android; iOS; Nintendo Switch; Google Stadia
- Release: Episode 1: Awake; 31 August 2017; Episode 2: Brave New World; 19 October 2017; Episode 3: Hell Is Empty; 20 December 2017
- Genre: Adventure
- Mode: Single-player

Life Is Strange: Before the Storm is a 2017 episodic adventure game in the Life is Strange series, developed by Deck Nine and published by Square Enix. It serves as a prequel to the original game, focusing on 16-year-old Chloe Price and her relationship with schoolmate Rachel Amber. Gameplay concerns itself mostly with the use of branching dialogues and interacting with the environment.

The game's three episodes were released for PlayStation 4, Windows, and Xbox One in late 2017. In September 2018, it was ported to Linux and macOS and later that month to Android and iOS. A remastered version of the game was released as part of the Life Is Strange Remastered Collection in February 2022.

Deck Nine began developing the game in 2016, using the Unity game engine. Ashly Burch from the original game did not voice Chloe Price in Before the Storm because of the 2016–17 game voice actor strike, but reprised her role in a Downloadable content (DLC) bonus episode once the strike was resolved. British indie band Daughter wrote and performed the score. Square Enix London Studios worked with Deck Nine for the development. During its release, Life Is Strange: Before the Storm received generally favourable reviews, praising the characters, themes, and story, while criticising aspects like plotholes, the main relationship, and the impact of player decisions near the end of the game.

== Gameplay ==
Players can choose from dialogue decisions for Chloe that affect later dialogue and events.

Life Is Strange: Before the Storm is a graphic adventure played from a third-person view. The player assumes control of 16-year-old Chloe Price, three years before Life Is Strange. Before the Storm features the ability "Backtalk", which the player can use to call upon Chloe to get out of certain precarious situations; "Backtalk" may also make a situation worse. A dialogue tree is used when a conversation or commentary is prompted. Occasional decisions will temporarily or permanently change outcomes. The environment can be interacted with and altered, including marking walls with graffiti.

== Plot ==
In her Oregon hometown of Arcadia Bay in 2010, 16-year-old Chloe Price (Rhianna DeVries; Ashly Burch in Farewell) sneaks into a punk rock concert at an abandoned lumber mill. Conflict arises with two men inside, but she evades them when schoolmate Rachel Amber (Kylie Brown) causes a distraction. The next day, Chloe and Rachel reunite at Blackwell Academy and decide to ditch class, stowing away on a cargo train and ending up at a lookout point. They people-watch through a viewfinder and see a man and woman kiss in the park, which upsets Rachel. They steal wine from local campers and take a walk to a scrapyard. Chloe confronts Rachel about her change in mood, but to no avail. Rachel later confesses that she witnessed her father, James (Patrick Finerty), through the viewfinder, cheating on her mother Rose (Kelly Handcock). Rachel destroys a family photo in a burning trash bin, and in a fit of rage kicks it over, igniting a wildfire.

The next day, Chloe and Rachel are reprimanded by Principal Raymond Wells (Marcus Oliver) for ditching school. Afterwards, Chloe has an argument with her mother Joyce (Bootsie Park) and the latter's boyfriend, David Madsen (D.W. McCann). She then hides out at the scrapyard where she finds an old truck in need of repair. Chloe later receives a call from local drug dealer Frank Bowers (Nick Apostolides), who arranges a meeting to discuss settling her debt. Chloe agrees to repay him by helping him steal money from her classmate Drew North (Trey Hutch), who owes Frank a large sum. However, Chloe learns that Drew is being violently extorted by another drug dealer, Damon Merrick (Kyle Williams). Later, when a student is unable to participate in the school's theater production of The Tempest due to road closures caused by the wildfire, Chloe reluctantly takes on the role opposite Rachel. After the play, they decide to leave Arcadia Bay with the truck from the scrapyard, and return to Rachel's house to pack. Following a confrontation there, James reveals that the woman they saw him kissing was Rachel's biological mother.

Rachel is told that her biological mother, Sera Gearhardt (Andrea Fletcher), is a drug addict, and that on the day her father kissed her, he had rejected Sera's plea to reunite with Rachel, after she adopted her away years before. Rachel vows to find Sera with Chloe's help, against James' wishes. Chloe contacts Frank, who agrees to meet her at the scrapyard. She repairs the truck there before Rachel arrives. They are ambushed by Damon, who stabs Rachel after he realises she is the district attorney's daughter. Surviving the wound, Rachel recovers at the hospital, while Chloe continues the search. She investigates James' office for clues about Sera, instead revealing that James is crooked and has been in contact with Damon. Chloe uses James' phone to convince Damon to disclose where Sera is located, and finds out that Damon has kidnapped her for ransom. She races to Damon to pay him off, but learns, when she reaches him, that James wanted him to kill Sera. Frank appears and fights off Damon, after which Sera entreats Chloe to never tell Rachel about James' actions. Back at the hospital, Chloe is faced with a choice: take matters into her own hands by telling Rachel everything or protect her from the truth. In the aftermath, Chloe and Rachel remain best friends, while Rachel also potentially reunites with Sera (if Chloe chooses to tell the truth). In a post-credits scene, Chloe attempts to contact Rachel, but she does not pick up her phone, as she partakes in a photography session, hinting at her eventual demise at the hands of Nathan Prescott and Mark Jefferson. (Note: As depicted in Life Is Strange (2015))

=== Farewell ===
In 2008, 13-year-old Max Caulfield (Hannah Telle) struggles to break the news to Chloe (Ashly Burch) that her family is moving to Seattle in three days. The two find a recording of their 8-year old selves speaking of a buried treasure. After finding the map and an amulet in the attic, Max and Chloe discover the treasure's spot, only to find that Chloe's father, William (Joe Ochman; Peter D. Michael in main episodes), had put their time capsule in a keg, along with his own recording, for safekeeping. Max can choose to either tell Chloe the truth, or hide it; their plans for the rest of the day are cut short when Joyce returns home and informs them that William died in a car crash. Max attends William's funeral days later and leaves for Seattle with her parents immediately after, leaving Chloe in grief.

== Development ==
Publisher Square Enix chose Deck Nine to develop the prequel to Life Is Strange after the developer's proprietary StoryForge tools, made up of a screenwriting software and cinematic engine, had made an impression. Development began in 2016 with assistance from Square Enix London Studios, employing the Unity game engine. Rhianna DeVries, who initially did the game's motion capture for Chloe Price, voiced the character, while the original voice actress Ashly Burch served as writing consultant. Burch did not reprise her role due to the 2016–17 game voice actor strike. With the strike over, Burch and Hannah Telle, who voiced Max Caulfield in Life Is Strange, returned for the bonus episode. The game went under different working titles during casting, according to Kylie Brown, who was cast as Rachel Amber (then codenamed Rebecca) in February 2017. The music was written and performed by the British indie folk band Daughter, and released as an album with 13 tracks by Glassnote Records on 1 September 2017. Instrumentation was employed to represent different sides of the lead character: piano for isolation, electric guitar for rebelliousness, and layered vocals for friendship. Daughter took the script and concept artwork as inspiration. The writers researched memoirs and psychology to understand Chloe's grieving process. The script was 1,500 pages, written by lead writer Zak Garriss and a writers' room. The writers' room model was borrowed from the television industry, with Garriss previously working on Criminal Minds: Beyond Borders. The first pitch for the bonus episode revolved around its ending and how to build from that.

== Release ==
Square Enix revealed Life Is Strange: Before the Storm on 11 June during Microsoft's E3 2017, stating it would be released over three chapters starting on 31 August for PlayStation 4, Windows, and Xbox One. Prior to its official announcement, images had leaked online indicating that a prequel to Life Is Strange was in development. The Deluxe Edition exclusively contains the Downloadable Content (DLC) bonus episode Farewell – featuring Max Caulfield of the original game as a playable character – three additional outfits, and Mixtape Mode, allowing players to customise playlists using the game's soundtrack. A campaign video called "Open Letter", featuring best friends, was released at episode 1's launch. Square Enix pledged to donate $5 to Jed Foundation, a nonprofit mental health charity, for every video with the #YourFriendMe hashtag.

On 6 March 2018, the bonus episode was launched alongside the physical releases of the Limited and Vinyl Edition. The Limited Edition contains an art book and the soundtrack on CD, while the Vinyl Edition includes the latter on phonograph record, and if pre-ordered, figures of Chloe and Rachel – both have content found in the Deluxe Edition and a download code for episode 1 of Life Is Strange. A Japanese dubbed version was released for PlayStation 4, Windows, and Xbox One on 7 June 2018. Feral Interactive developed ports for Linux and macOS that they published on 13 September 2018. Deck Nine ported the game for Android and iOS, released on 19 September.

== Reception ==
Aggregate review scores
Game	Metacritic
Complete Season	(PC) 77/100 (PS4) 77/100 (XONE) 82/100
Episode 1: Awake	(PC) 80/100 (PS4) 78/100 (XONE) 79/100
Episode 2: Brave New World	(PC) 76/100 (PS4) 79/100 (XONE) 76/100
Episode 3: Hell Is Empty	(PC) 75/100 (PS4) 77/100 (XONE) 81/100

The game was met with generally favourable reviews, according to Metacritic. Critics praised the characters, themes, and story, but criticised plotholes, the main relationship, and the impact of players' decisions near the end of the game. Episode 1: Awake received mostly positive reviews from critics for the character development of Chloe Price and Rachel Amber. Jeremy Peeples of Hardcore Gamer found Chloe's behaviour "endearing" and noted that her personality was portrayed with multiple layers. Sam Loveridge at GamesRadar wrote that Rachel was the more authentic character because of her more "grounded" dialogue. Despite disparaging Chloe for being "her same tiresomely combative self" early on, Metro saw her fleshed out by enduring the loss of her father. Game Informer's Kimberley Wallace thought the younger version of Chloe brought a "naivety and vulnerability" worthy of sympathy. Conversely, the relationship between the leads was said to have formed "at unnatural speed." Peeples and Loveridge favoured the "Backtalk" gameplay feature, while Metro and Wallace cared little for it.

Reviewers found Episode 2: Brave New World to either be better than the first installment or one of the series' greatest. Metro praised how choices made a difference with a "profound effect" on character arc, while Ozzie Mejia of Shacknews relished in Chloe's "genuine growth" contrasting her "fiery spirit". Game Informer's Joe Juba declared the continued comprehension of the character "its biggest strength". However, Juba's biggest complaint echoed Wallace's derision of the "forced" manner with which Chloe and Rachel become friends. Brett Makedonski, writing for Destructoid, thought the character exposition was done "to great effect." Most noted was The Tempest school play sequence, which Metro said was their favorite, Mejia called "one of the funniest" in Before the Storm, and Juba observed as the culmination of all past choices. Metro criticised the script for being "uneven" and disapproved of the voice acting. Mejia felt the ending could have been done away with, saying it was "a bit drawn out," though he was impressed with "Backtalk".

Metro and Peeples agreed that Episode 3: Hell Is Empty was the most emotional of the season. The writing was lauded as authentic and genuine, with Wallace noting that it showed new sides to minor characters; conversely, Makedonski criticised that an ancillary character with little development became a primary antagonist. Although Metro observed some inconsistent dialogue and voice acting, Peeples said the cast showed "incredible chemistry". Wallace thought that Chloe and Rachel's "tender moments" were the best parts of the episode and Makedonski said "their struggles, their mutual escapism, and their sacrifices" provided more than enough investment. Reviewers generally approved of how the game concluded. RPG Site described the Farewell DLC episode as a great epilogue.

=== Accolades ===
Following E3 2017, Life Is Strange: Before the Storm won one of GamesRadar+'s Best of E3 awards and was nominated for Hardcore Gamer's Adventure Game award. It was also nominated for "Best Simulation Game" and "Best Family Game" at the Gamescom 2017 Awards. The game received a nomination in the Games for Impact category at The Game Awards 2017. At the 2017 Golden Joystick Awards, it was nominated for Best Audio and Best Performer for Kylie Brown. It won the award for Best Soundtrack and Most Touching Moment (The Tempest school play with Chloe and Rachel) in Game Informer's 2017 Adventure Game of the Year Awards, while it took the lead for Best Adventure Game in their Reader's Choice Best of 2017 Awards. Eurogamer ranked the game 16th on their list of the Top 50 Games of 2017.

It was nominated for "Best Music Supervision in a Video Game" at the Guild of Music Supervisors Awards, for the "Matthew Crump Cultural Innovation Award" at the 2018 SXSW Gaming Awards, for "Best Emotional Game" at the Emotional Games Awards 2018, and for "Game Beyond Entertainment" at the 14th British Academy Games Awards; it won the award for "Song Collection" at the 2018 NAVGTR Awards, whereas nominations were for "Game, Franchise Adventure" and "Writing in a Drama". At the Italian Video Game Awards, it was nominated for "Game Beyond Entertainment". At the 2018 Webby Awards, the game won the People's Voice Award for "Best Writing" and for "Public Service & Activism", while nominated for "Strategy/Simulation". It received the "Game of the Year" and "Most Significant Impact" awards at the 2018 Games for Change Awards, with a nomination for "Best Gameplay". In 2018, Ivor Novello Awards nominated it for "Best Original Video Game Score".
