= Angus & Julia Stone discography =

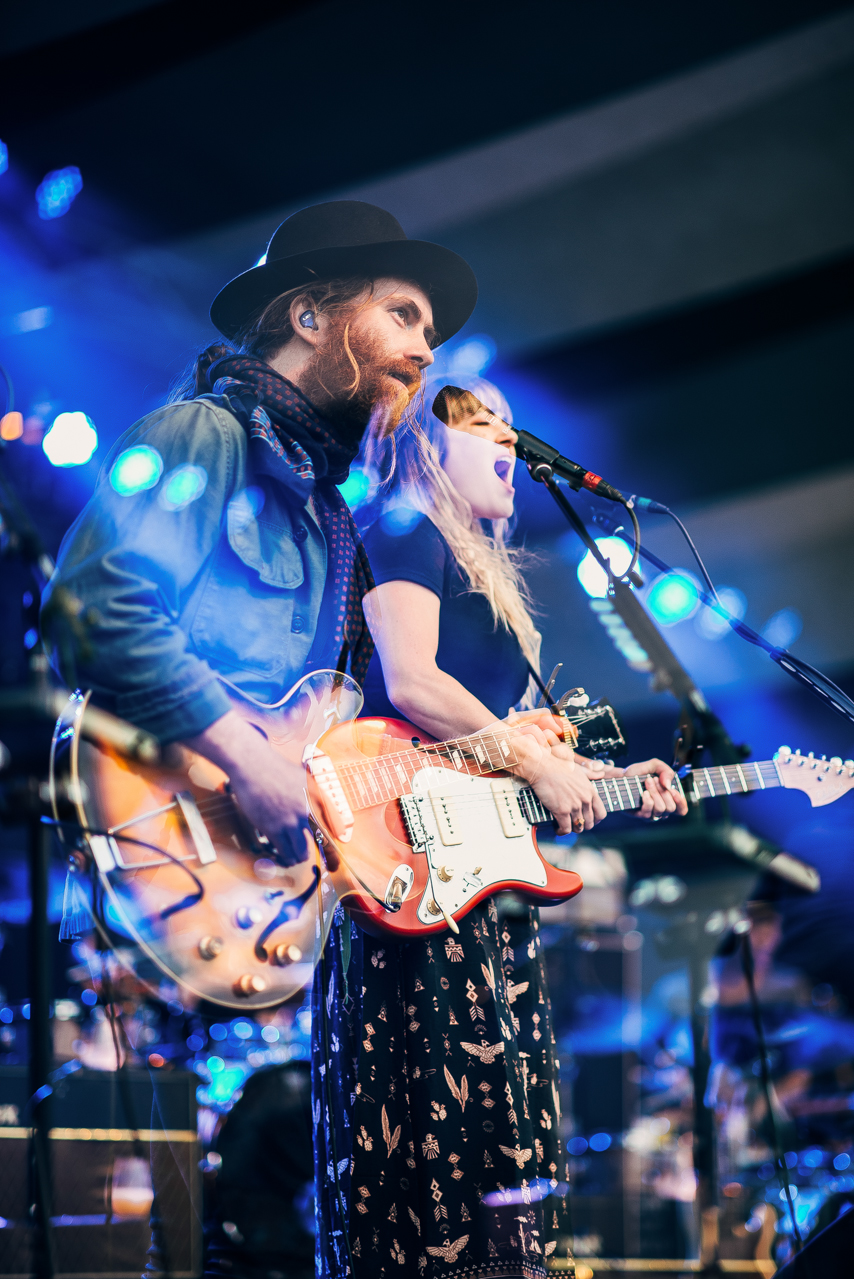
- Angus & Julia Stone Edmonton 2015
- Studio albums: 6
- EPs: 2
- Soundtrack albums: 1
- Live albums: 6
- Compilation albums: 2
- Singles: 28
- Box sets: 1

The discography of Angus & Julia Stone, an Australian folk and indie pop duo, consisting of brother and sister Angus and Julia Stone, consists of six studio albums, one soundtrack, six live albums, two EPs and twenty-eight singles.

== Albums ==
=== Studio albums ===
List of studio albums, with selected chart positions
Title	Album details	Peak chart positions										Certifications
Title	Album details	AUS	AUT	BEL (FL)	BEL (WA)	FRA	GER	NLD	NZ	SWI	UK	Certifications
A Book Like This	Released: 8 September 2007; Label: Capitol; Format: CD, CD+DVD, digital download	6	—	—	—	—	—	—	—	—	—	ARIA: 2× Platinum
Down the Way	Released: 12 March 2010; Label: Capitol; Format: CD, LP, digital download	1	34	—	48	26	—	66	—	91	—	ARIA: 4× Platinum
Angus & Julia Stone	Released: 1 August 2014; Label: Capitol; Format: CD, LP, digital download	1	16	5	4	8	8	8	6	3	54	ARIA: Platinum; SNEP: Gold
Snow	Released: 15 September 2017; Label: EMI; Format: CD, LP, digital download	2	51	16	11	10	21	17	13	11	98	ARIA: Gold
Cape Forestier	Released: 10 May 2024; Label: Sony; Format: CD, LP, digital download	5	—	68	43	49	36	—	19	12	— (Note: Cape Forestier did not enter the UK Albums Chart, but peaked at number 44 on the UK Albums Sales Chart Top 100.)	
Karaoke Bar	Released: 4 September 2026; Label: Angus and Julia Stone, Virgin; Format: CD, LP, digital download	1	—	—	—	—	—	—	—	98	—	
"—" denotes a recording that did not chart or was not released in that territory.

=== Soundtrack albums ===
List of studio albums, with selected chart positions
Title	Album details	Peak chart positions
Title	Album details	AUS
Life is Strange	Released: 20 August 2021; Label: BMG; Format: Digital download, streaming	16

=== Live albums ===
List of live albums, with selected chart positions
Title	Album details	Peak chart positions	
Title	Album details	AUS	FRA
iTunes Live: London Sessions	Released: 23 March 2008; Label: Self-released; Format: Digital download	—	—
Live Session	Released: 12 June 2009; Label: EMI; Format: Digital download	—	—
iTunes Live: Live from Sydney	Released: 8 October 2010; Label: EMI; Format: Digital download	26	—
iTunes Live: ARIA Awards Concert Series 2010	Released: 9 November 2010; Label: EMI; Format: Digital download	—	—
Triple J Live	Released: 18 April 2011; Label: Discograph; Format: Digital download	—	—
Live 2014	Released: 29 July 2014; Label: Discograph; Format: Digital download	—	89
"—" denotes a recording that did not chart or was not released in that territory.

=== Compilation albums ===
List of compilation albums, with selected chart positions
Title	Album details	Peak chart positions				Certifications
Title	Album details	AUS	FRA	UK DL	UK Indie	Certifications
Heart Full of Wine/Chocolates & Cigarettes	Released: 5 March 2007; Label: EMI; Format: CD	—	—	18	—	
Red Berries	Released: 15 November 2010; Label: Discograph; Format: Digital download	— (Note: Red Berries was released as a bonus disc on Down the Way in Australia)	84	—	—	
Memories of an Old Friend	Released: 17 December 2010; Label: EMI; Format: CD, digital download	57	—	63	29	ARIA: Gold
"—" denotes a recording that did not chart or was not released in that territory.

== Extended plays ==
List of extended plays
Title	Extended play details
Chocolates & Cigarettes	Released: 26 August 2006; Label: Capitol; Format: CD, 12"
Heart Full of Wine	Released: 3 February 2007; Label: Capitol; Format: CD, 12"
Spotify Sessions	Released: 13 January 2015; Label: Republic; Format: digital download

== Singles ==
List of singles, with selected chart positions
Title	Year	Peak chart positions										Certifications	Album
Title	Year	AUS	AUT	BEL (FL)	BEL (WA)	FRA	GER	NZ	NLD Tip	SWI	UK Indie	Certifications	Album
"Paper Aeroplane"	2006	—	17	—	—	—	—	—	—	—	—	ARIA: Gold	Chocolates & Cigarettes
"Mango Tree"	2006	—	—	—	—	—	—	—	—	—	—	ARIA: Platinum	Chocolates & Cigarettes
"Private Lawns"	2007	—	—	—	—	—	—	—	—	—	48		Chocolates & Cigarettes
"The Beast"	2007	40	—	—	—	—	—	—	—	—	—	ARIA: Gold	A Book Like This
"Wasted"	2008	—	—	—	—	—	—	—	—	—	—		A Book Like This
"Just a Boy"	2008	—	—	—	—	—	—	—	—	—	—	ARIA: Platinum	A Book Like This
"Hollywood"	2008	—	—	—	—	—	—	—	—	—	—		A Book Like This
"And the Boys"	2009	44	—	—	—	—	—	—	—	—	—	ARIA: Platinum	Down the Way
"Black Crow"	2010	—	—	—	—	—	—	—	—	—	—		Down the Way
"Big Jet Plane"	2010	21	—	—	23	36	—	20	—	—	—	ARIA: 11× Platinum; BPI: Silver	Down the Way
"For You"	2011	—	—	—	—	—	—	—	—	—	—	ARIA: Platinum	Down the Way
"Heart Beats Slow"	2014	37	—	—	—	—	—	—	—	—	—	ARIA: Platinum	Angus & Julia Stone
"Death Defying Acts"	2014	—	—	—	—	—	—	—	—	—	—		Angus & Julia Stone
"A Heartbreak"	2014	68	—	— (Note: "A Heartbreak" did not enter the Flanders Ultratop 50, but peaked at number 32 on the Ultratip chart.)	— (Note: "A Heartbreak" did not enter the Wallonie Ultratop 50, but peaked at number 41 on the Ultratip chart.)	156	—	—	—	—	—	ARIA: Gold	Angus & Julia Stone
"Grizzly Bear"	2014	—	—	— (Note: "Grizzly Bear" did not enter the Flanders Ultratop 50, but peaked at number 22 on the Ultratip chart.)	49	50	94	—	8	64	—	ARIA: Platinum	Angus & Julia Stone
"Get Home"	2014	64	—	—	—	—	—	—	—	—	—	ARIA: Gold	Angus & Julia Stone
"The Hanging Tree"	2015	—	—	—	—	—	—	—	—	—	—		Non-album single
"Snow"	2017	— (Note: "Snow" did not enter the Australian ARIA Singles Chart but peaked at number nine on the ARIA Hitseekers Chart.)	—	— (Note: "Snow" did not enter the Flanders Ultratop 50, but charted as an "extra tip" Ultratip chart.)	— (Note: "Snow" did not enter the Wallonie Ultratop 50, but peaked at number 24 on the Ultratip chart.)	116	—	—	—	—	—	ARIA: Platinum	Snow
"Chateau"	2017	26	—	— (Note: "Chateau" did not enter the Flanders Ultratop 50, but charted as an "extra tip" Ultratip chart.)	— (Note: "Chateau" did not enter the Wallonie Ultratop 50, but charted as an "extra tip" Ultratip chart.)	89	—	—	24	—	—	ARIA: 7× Platinum	Snow
"Cellar Door"	2017	—	—	—	— (Note: "Cellar Door" did not enter the Wallonie Ultratop 50, but charted as an "extra tip" Ultratip chart.)	—	—	—	—	—	—	ARIA: Gold	Snow
"Nothing Else"	2018	—	—	—	—	—	—	—	—	—	—	ARIA: Platinum	Snow
"Youngblood"	2018	—	—	—	—	—	—	—	—	—	—	ARIA: Gold	Non-album singles
"Passionfruit"	2018	—	—	—	—	—	—	—	—	—	—		Non-album singles
"Love Song"	2021	—	—	—	—	—	—	— (Note: "Love Song" did not enter the NZ Top 40 Singles Chart, but peaked at number 38 on the NZ Hot Singles Chart.)	—	—	—		Life Is Strange
"The Wedding Song"	2024	—	—	—	—	—	—	—	—	—	—		Cape Forestier
"Cape Forestier"	2024	—	—	—	—	—	—	— (Note: "Cape Forestier" did not enter the NZ Top 40 Singles Chart, but peaked at number 25 on the NZ Hot Singles Chart.)	—	—	—		Cape Forestier
"Losing You"	2024	—	—	—	—	—	—	—	—	—	—		Cape Forestier
"No Boat, No Aeroplane"	2024	—	—	—	—	—	—	—	—	—	—		Cape Forestier
"Karaoke Bar"	2026	—	—	—	—	—	—	—	—	—	—		Karaoke Bar
"Monroe"	2026	—	—	—	—	—	—	—	—	—	—		Karaoke Bar
"Celestial Bodies"	2026	—	—	—	—	—	—	—	—	—	—		Karaoke Bar
"The Cherry Farm"	2026	—	—	—	—	—	—	— (Note: "The Cherry Farm" did not enter the NZ Top 40 Singles Chart, but peaked at number 32 on the NZ Hot 40 Singles Chart.)	—	—	—		Karaoke Bar
"—" denotes a recording that did not chart or was not released in that territory.

== Other charted and certified songs ==
List of other charted or certified songs, with selected chart positions
Title	Year	Peak chart positions		Certification	Album
Title	Year	NZ Hot	UK Indie	Certification	Album
"You're the One That I Want"	2010	—	21		"Big Jet Plane" single
"Hold On"	2010	—	—	ARIA: Gold	Down the Way
"Santa Monica Dream"	2010	—	—	ARIA: Gold	Down the Way
"The Devil's Tears"	2010	—	—	ARIA: Gold	Down the Way
"Yellow Brick Road"	2010	—	—	ARIA: Gold	Down the Way
"Stay with Me"	2016	—	—	ARIA: Gold	Spotify Sessions
"Oakwood"	2017	—	—	ARIA: Gold	Snow
"Down to the Sea"	2024	32	—		Cape Forestier
"The Start"	2026	22	—		Karaoke Bar
"—" denotes a recording that did not chart or was not released in that territory.

== Videos ==
=== Music videos ===
List of Music videos, showing director(s)
Title	Year	Director(s)
"Paper Aeroplane"	2006	
"Mango Tree"	2006	Angus & Julia Stone
"Private Lawns"	2006	Angus & Julia Stone
"Chocolates & Cigarettes"	2006	Angus & Julia Stone
"Babylon"	2006	Josh Groom
"What You Wanted"	2007	Angus & Julia Stone
"Heart Full of Wine"	2007	Angus & Julia Stone
"I'm Yours"	2007	Angus & Julia Stone
"The Beast"	2007	
"Wasted"	2007	Angus & Julia Stone
"Just a Boy"	2007	Angus & Julia Stone and Josh Groom
"Hollywood"	2007	Angus & Julia Stone
"Black Crow"	2010	Nick Murray Willis
"And the Boys"	2010	Kiku Ohe
"Big Jet Plane"	2010	Kiku Ohe
"Hold On"	2010	Kiku Ohe
"I'm Not Yours"	2010	Nick Murray Willis
"Heart Beats Slow"	2014	Jessie Hill
"A Heartbreak"	2014	Jessie Hill
"Get Home"	2014	Jessie Hill
"Grizzly Bear"	2014	Jessie Hill
"From the Stalls"	2015	Kiku Ohe
"Snow"	2017	Onil Kotian
"Chateau"	2017	Jessie Hill
"Cellar Door"	2017	Onil Kotian
"Nothing Else"	2018	Jessie Hill
"The Wedding Song"	2024	
"Cape Forestier"	2024	
"Losing You"	2024	Claudia Sangiorgi Dalimore

== See also ==
- Angus Stone
- Julia Stone
