= Julia Stone discography =

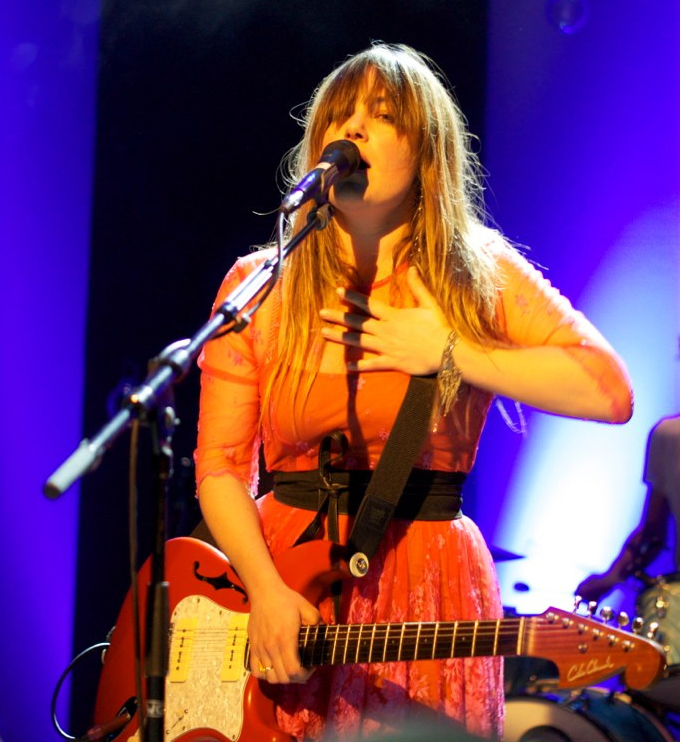
- Julia performing at the Motel Mozaïque, Rotterdam, The Netherlands, April 2012.
- Studio albums: 4
- EPs: 2
- Singles: 20

The discography of Julia Stone, an Australian folk singer-songwriter, consists of four studio albums, two EPs and twenty singles (including five as featured artist).

Stone also performs with her brother Angus as the duo, Angus & Julia Stone.

== Albums ==
=== Studio albums ===
List of studio albums, with release date, label, and selected chart positions shown
Title	Details	Peak chart positions				
Title	Details	AUS	BEL (Fl)	BEL (Wa)	FRA	NLD
The Memory Machine	Released: September 2010; Label: EMI Australia; Formats: CD, digital download	73	—	—	137	—
By the Horns	Released: 25 May 2012; Label: EMI Australia; Formats: CD, digital download	11	59	53	146	59
Sixty Summers	Released: 30 April 2021; Label: BMG; Formats: CD, LP, digital download, streaming	16	192	183	—	—
Everything Is Christmas	Released: 10 December 2021; Label: BMG; Formats: CD, LP, digital download, streaming	— (Note: Everything Is Christmas did not enter the ARIA Top 100 Album Chart, but peaked at number 7 on the Australian Independent Albums Chart.)	—	—	—	—

== Extended plays ==
List of EPs
Title	Details
Everything Is Christmas	Released: 11 December 2020; Label: Julia Stone, BMG; Formats: digital download streaming
Twin	Released: 18 December 2020; Label: Julia Stone, BMG; Formats: digital download streaming

== Singles ==
=== As lead artist ===
List of singles, with year released, selected chart positions and certifications, and album name shown
Title	Year	Peak chart positions		Album
Title	Year	AUS	NZ Hot	Album
"You're the One That I Want"	2010	—	—	Non-album single
"Maybe"	2010	—	—	The Memory Machine
"Let's Forget All the Things That We Say"	2012	—	—	By the Horns
"It's All Okay"	2012	—	—	By the Horns
"Justine"	2012	—	—	By the Horns
"I Was Only 19: (Live from the People Speak)"	2012	—	—	Non-album singles
"Breathe It In" (with Garrett Kato)	2020	—	—	Non-album singles
"Beds Are Burning"	2020	—	—	Songs for Australia
"I Want Everything"	2020	—	—	Only: Music from the Motion Picture
"Break"	2020	—	—	Sixty Summers
"Unreal"	2020	—	—	Sixty Summers
"Dance"	2020	—	—	Sixty Summers
"We All Have" (featuring Matt Berninger)	2021	—	37	Sixty Summers
"Fire in Me"	2021	—	—	Sixty Summers
"I Want to Know What Love Is"	2021	—	—	Love Me (soundtrack)

=== As featured artist ===
List of singles, with year released, selected chart positions and certifications, and album name shown
Title	Year	Peak chart positions	Certifications	Album
Title	Year	AUS	Certifications	Album
"Regardless" (Jarryd James featuring Julia Stone)	2015	48	ARIA: Gold	Thirty One
"Wolfie" (Golden Features featuring Julia Stone)	2016	—		"Wolfie / Funeral"
"Solid Gold" (Elk Road featuring Julia Stone)	2017	—		Non-album single
"Without Your Love" (The Paper Kites featuring Julia Stone)	2020	—		Roses
"Got Me" (Maya Jane Coles featuring Julia Stone)	2021	—		Non-album single
"Fiyah" (Adrian Dzvuke featuring Julia Stone)	2022	—		Non-album single
"Fortress" (Dan Sultan featuring Julia Stone)	2023	—		Dan Sultan
"—" denotes a recording that did not chart or was not released.

== See also ==
- Angus and Julia Stone
