= Memories of an Old Friend =

Compilation album by Angus & Julia Stone
- Released: 17 December 2010
- Genre: Folk, acoustic
- Label: EMI Music Australia, Capitol Records

Angus & Julia Stone chronology
Down the Way (2010)	Memories of an Old Friend (2010)	Angus & Julia Stone (2014)

Memories of an Old Friend is a compilation album by Australian singer-songwriter duo Angus & Julia Stone. It was released in December 2010 in Australia through EMI Music Australia and peaked at number 57 on the ARIA Charts in February 2011.

== Track listing ==
No.	Title	Original release	Length
1.	"Private Lawns"	Chocolates and Cigarettes	3:05
2.	"Babylon"	Chocolates and Cigarettes	5:01
3.	"Paper Aeroplane"	Chocolates and Cigarettes	3:41
4.	"Take You Away"	"And the Boys"	3:49
5.	"My Malakai"	"Big Jet Plane"	3:06
6.	"Lonely Hands"	"Hollywood"	3:47
7.	"Little Bird"	"The Beast"	4:28
8.	"Chocolates and Cigarettes"	Chocolates and Cigarettes	3:56
9.	"Old Friend"		4:06
10.	"Choking"	"The Beast"	5:46
11.	"Mango Tree"	Chocolates and Cigarettes	3:45
12.	"Heart Full of Wine"	Heart Full of Wine	4:27
13.	"All of Me"	Chocolates and Cigarettes	5:26

== Charts ==
Chart (2010/11)	Peak position
Australia (ARIA Chart)	57

== Certifications ==
Region	Certification	Certified units/sales
Australia (ARIA)	Gold	35,000^{‡}
^{‡} Sales+streaming figures based on certification alone.

== Release history ==
Country	Date	Format	Label	Catalogue
Australia	17 December 2010	CD, Music download	Capitol Records/EMI Music	0947432
Europe	December 2012	CD, DD	Discograph	DGV3233052
