= The Beast (Angus & Julia Stone song) =

Single by Angus and Julia Stone

from the album A Book Like This
- Released: 18 August 2007
- Length: 3:50
- Songwriters: Angus Stone, Julia Stone
- Producer: Fran Healy

Angus and Julia Stone singles chronology
"Private Lawns" (2007)	"The Beast" (2007)	"Wasted" (2008)

"The Beast" is a song by Australian singer songwriters Angus & Julia Stone. It was released in August 2007 as the lead single from the duo's debut studio album A Book Like This. The song peaked at number 40 on the ARIA Charts; becoming the duo's first charting single. The single was released in the United Kingdom in October 2007.

At the ARIA Music Awards of 2008, the song was nominated for Breakthrough Artist – Single.

== Track listing ==
All tracks are written by Angus & Julia Stone.

Australian release
No.	Title	Length
1.	"The Beast"	3:50
2.	"Purple Skivvy"	2:50
3.	"I'll Wait"	3:00
4.	"Little Bird"	4:30

United Kingdom release
No.	Title	Length
1.	"The Beast"	3:50
2.	"Purple Skivvy"	2:50
3.	"I'll Wait"	3:00
4.	"Choking"	5:46
5.	"Little Bird"	4:30
6.	"The Beast" (video clip)	3:53

== Charts ==
Chart (2007)	Peak position
Australia (ARIA)	40

== Certifications ==
Region	Certification	Certified units/sales
Australia (ARIA)	Gold	35,000^{‡}
^{‡} Sales+streaming figures based on certification alone.
