= Cape Forestier =

Studio album by Angus & Julia Stone
- Released: 10 May 2024
- Length: 45:12
- Label: Sony
- Producers: Ben Edgar; Angus Stone; Julia Stone

Angus & Julia Stone chronology
Life Is Strange (2021)	Cape Forestier (2024)	Karaoke Bar (2026)

Singles from Cape Forestier
- 1. "The Wedding Song" Released: 9 February 2024; 2. "Cape Forestier" Released: 8 March 2024; 3. "Losing You" Released: 5 April 2024; 4. "No Boat, No Aeroplane" Released: 3 May 2024

Cape Forestier is the fifth studio album by the Australian singer-songwriter duo Angus & Julia Stone. It was released on 10 May 2024. The album was announced on 9 February 2024, alongside the release of the album's lead single. The titular single "Cape Forestier", "Losing You" and "No Boat, No Aeroplane". were also both released prior to the album. A world tour spanning from 12 April 2024 to 7 September 2024 was announced to support the album's release.

At the 2024 ARIA Music Awards, the album was nominated for ARIA Award for Best Adult Contemporary Album and Eric J Debowsky was nominated for Best Engineered Release.

== Background and composition ==
Cape Forestier is the sibling duo's first project since their soundtrack album Life is Strange in 2021, and first studio album in seven years following Snow in 2017. The duo describes the album as "holds a really special place in our hearts" and believes the album has a similar sound to their earlier records, but has been influenced "with all the branches of experience hanging in there".

== Release and promotion ==
The first single from the album titled "The Wedding Song" was released on 9 February 2024. The album's titular track "Cape Forestier" was released on 8 March, along with the announcement of the album's release date. "Losing You" was the third single from the album released on 5 April. "No Boat, No Aeroplane" was released on 2 May as the album's 4th single.

The duo announced "The Living Room Sessions World Tour" to support the album, with a variety of live shows which spans across Europe, Northern America and Australia starting on 12 April 2024 in Zermatt and ending on 7 September 2024 in Queenstown.

== Track listing ==
All tracks are written by Angus Stone and Julia Stone, except where noted.

Cape Forestier track listing
No.	Title	Writer(s)	Length
1.	"Losing You"		3:35
2.	"Down to the Sea"		3:19
3.	"My Little Anchor"		3:45
4.	"Cape Forestier"		3:52
5.	"Country Sign"		5:52
6.	"City of Lights"		3:57
7.	"No Boat No Aeroplane"		5:12
8.	"The Wedding Song"		3:16
9.	"I Want You"	Bob Dylan	2:55
10.	"Somehow"		4:41
11.	"Sitting in Seoul"		3:50
12.	"The Wonder of You"	Baker Knight	0:58
Total length:			45:12

== Personnel ==
- Angus Stone – production (all tracks), engineering (tracks 1–8, 10)
- Julia Stone – production (all tracks), mixing (track 12), engineering (tracks 1–8, 10–12)
- Ben Edgar – production (tracks 3, 4), engineering (1, 3–5, 7, 8, 10–12)
- Greg Calbi – mastering (tracks 1–8, 10–12)
- Steve Fallone – mastering (tracks 1–8, 10–12)
- Eric J Dubowsky – mixing (tracks 1, 3, 5, 7, 10, 11)
- Andrew Sarlo – mixing (tracks 2, 4, 6, 8)
- Andrew Carey – mixing, engineering (track 9)
- Paul Pilsneniks – engineering (tracks 1–8, 10–12)
- Leigh Fisher – engineering (tracks 1, 2, 4, 5, 10, 12)
- Thomas Bartlett – engineering (tracks 1–3, 7)
- Joshua Moore – engineering (tracks 1, 6, 8)
- Adam Rhodes – engineering (tracks 2, 6)
- Louis Remenapp – engineering (tracks 2, 5, 7, 10–12)

== Charts ==
=== Weekly charts ===
Weekly chart performance for Cape Forestier
Chart (2024)	Peak position
Australian Albums (ARIA)	5
Belgian Albums (Ultratop Flanders)	68
Belgian Albums (Ultratop Wallonia)	43
French Albums (SNEP)	49
German Albums (Offizielle Top 100)	36
New Zealand Albums (RMNZ)	19
Scottish Albums (Official Charts)	33
Swiss Albums (Schweizer Hitparade)	12
UK Album Downloads (Official Charts)	50
UK Independent Albums (Official Charts)	17

=== Year-end charts ===
2024 year-end chart performance for Cape Forestier
Chart (2024)	Position
Australian Artist Albums (ARIA)	41
