= Angus & Julia Stone (album) =

2014 studio album by Angus & Julia Stone

Studio album by Angus & Julia Stone
- Released: 1 August 2014
- Recorded: Late 2013 – April 2014
- Studio: Shangri-La (Malibu, California)
- Genre: Folk
- Length: 60:07
- Label: EMI
- Producers: Angus & Julia Stone; Rick Rubin

Angus & Julia Stone chronology
Memories of an Old Friend (2010)	Angus & Julia Stone (2014)	Snow (2017)

Singles from Angus & Julia Stone
- 1. "Heart Beats Slow" Released: 27 May 2014; 2. "Death Defying Acts" Released: 17 June 2014; 3. "A Heartbreak" Released: 8 July 2014; 4. "Grizzly Bear" Released: 22 July 2014; 5. "Get Home" Released: 26 August 2014

Angus & Julia Stone is the third studio album by Australian singer-songwriter duo Angus & Julia Stone, released on 1 August 2014 in Australia through EMI Music Australia, and on the same day in the United States through American Recordings. Its release was preceded by the singles "Heart Beats Slow", which peaked at No. 37 in Australia, "Death Defying Acts" in June, "A Heartbreak" and "Grizzly Bear" in July. The videos for all four songs as well as a video for "Get Home" were directed by Jessie Hill.

American record producer Rick Rubin helped reunite the duo and co-produced the album. Rubin said of the experience: "This album is extraordinary; Angus and Julia are truly unique musicians. They are authentic and pure people who do things from the heart. I've never worked with anyone like them before." The album has been said to contain "blended harmonies [...] and more experimental guitar textures".

The album is the highest-charting by the duo to date, reaching the top 10 in several countries including France, Germany, the Netherlands and New Zealand. With an average of 67 based on 7 reviews on review aggregator Metacritic, Angus & Julia Stone received generally favourable critical reception.

== Track listing ==
All tracks are written by Angus & Julia Stone.

Standard edition
No.	Title	Length
1.	"A Heartbreak"	4:16
2.	"My Word for It"	4:08
3.	"Grizzly Bear"	4:08
4.	"Heart Beats Slow"	4:35
5.	"Wherever You Are"	3:41
6.	"Get Home"	4:31
7.	"Death Defying Acts"	5:13
8.	"Little Whiskey"	3:36
9.	"From the Stalls"	5:09
10.	"Other Things"	2:59
11.	"Please You"	5:40
12.	"Main Street"	5:35
13.	"Crash and Burn"	6:36
Total length:		60:07

Deluxe edition bonus tracks
No.	Title	Length
14.	"Do Without"	4:15
15.	"All This Love"	4:05
16.	"Roses"	3:29
Total length:		71:56

Australian iTunes Store special edition
No.	Title	Length
1.	"A Heartbreak" (Live in London / 2014)	4:50
2.	"Main Street" (Live in Sesto / 2014)	5:51
3.	"For You" (Live in Brisbane / 2014)	5:02
4.	"Crash & Burn" (Live in Lyon / 2014)	6:15
5.	"My Word for It" (Live in Brisbane / 2014)	4:14
6.	"Big Jet Plane" (Live in Lyon / 2014)	4:15
7.	"Other Things" (Live in Newcastle / 2014)	6:03
8.	"Wedding Song" (Live in Melbourne / 2014)	3:44
9.	"Wherever You Are" (Live in Brooklyn / 2014)	3:40
10.	"Death Defying Acts" (Live in Vienna / 2014)	5:41
11.	"Santa Monica Dream" (Live in Paris / 2014)	5:24
Total length:		54:49

== Charts ==
=== Weekly charts ===
Weekly chart performance for Angus & Julia Stone
Chart (2014)	Peak position
Australian Albums (ARIA)	1
Austrian Albums (Ö3 Austria)	16
Belgian Albums (Ultratop Flanders)	5
Belgian Albums (Ultratop Wallonia)	4
Dutch Albums (Album Top 100)	6
French Albums (SNEP)	8
German Albums (Offizielle Top 100)	8
New Zealand Albums (RMNZ)	6
Swiss Albums (Schweizer Hitparade)	3

=== Year-end charts ===
2014 year-end chart performance for Angus & Julia Stone
Chart (2014)	Position
Australian Albums (ARIA)	28
Belgian Albums (Ultratop Flanders)	117
Belgian Albums (Ultratop Wallonia)	88
French Albums (SNEP)	108

2015 year-end chart performance for Angus & Julia Stone
Chart (2015)	Position
Australian Albums (ARIA)	68

== Certifications ==
Certifications for Angus & Julia Stone
Region	Certification	Certified units/sales
Australia (ARIA)	Platinum	70,000^{^}
France (SNEP)	Gold	50,000^{*}
New Zealand (RMNZ)	Gold	7,500^{‡}
^{*} Sales figures based on certification alone.^{^} Shipments figures based on certification alone.^{‡} Sales+streaming figures based on certification alone.
