= Take You Higher (Goodwill and Hook n Sling song) =

Single by Goodwill and Hook n Sling
- Released: October 31, 2011
- Genre: House
- Length: 3:09
- Label: Nettwerk, NEWS, La Musique Fait La Force
- Songwriter: Angus Stone; Julia Stone
- Producers: Goodwill; Hook n Sling

"Take You Higher" is a 2011 song by Australian DJs and producers Goodwill and Hook n Sling. It is an EDM remix of the song "Big Jet Plane" by Australian duo Angus & Julia Stone. It was released in October 2011 as a single and reached the top ten in Belgium and Poland.

== Music video ==
The music video was directed by Benn Jae and premiered in November 2011. It was filmed on the east coast of New South Wales.

== Track listing ==
Digital promo - Europe (2011)

1. "Take You Higher" - 3:09

== Chart performance ==
=== Weekly charts ===
Chart (2011–2012)	Peak position
Belgium (Ultratop 50 Flanders)	3
Belgium (Ultratop 50 Wallonia)	5
Netherlands (Single Top 100)	82
Poland (Polish Airplay Top 100)	3

=== Year-end charts ===
Chart (2012)	Position
Belgium (Ultratop Flanders)	23
Belgium (Ultratop Wallonia)	40
