= Alex Chen =

Video game protagonist

- Life Is Strange character
- Alex Chen as depicted in True Colors
- First appearance: Life Is Strange: True Colors (2021)
- Voiced by: Erika Mori; mxmtoon (singing voice)

In-universe information
- Full name: Alexandra Chen
- Family: Gabe Chen (brother, deceased); John Chen (father, deceased); Wendy Chen (mother, deceased)
- Origin: Portland, Oregon, U.S.

Alexandra "Alex" Chen is a character in the Life Is Strange video game series, published by Square Enix. Created by American developer Deck Nine, she is the player character in Life Is Strange: True Colors (2021), where she is voiced by Erika Mori. Alex has the supernatural power to see, experience, and manipulate the emotions of people around her. At the outset of the game, she moves from Portland, Oregon to the fictional Colorado town of Haven Springs to live with her brother Gabe Chen, who dies in an accident soon after her arrival. She is forced to utilize her power of empathy, the volatility of which has made her life difficult up to this point, in order to discover the truth behind her brother's tragic death and find closure for herself.

Several different versions of Alex were originally workshopped during the concept phase, before the developmental team decided to finalise her backstory as an Asian-American character who grew up in the foster care system. The development team did extensive research work on the experience of being in the foster care system, which informed the writing and performance. Deck Nine Senior staff writer Felice Kuan was the primary writer responsible for Alex. She is portrayed by actress Erika Mori through full performance motion capture. Recording artist mxmtoon served as the character's singing voice. All three women drew from experiences of their own cultural backgrounds as Asian Americans in their respective contributions towards the depiction of the character in True Colors.

Both Alex Chen and the performance of her actress Erika Mori have been met with a generally positive reception from fans of the Life Is Strange series, as well as critical acclaim from video game publications with multiple award nominations and accolades. Several commentators recognized Alex's importance as a milestone for diversity in the representation of characters from minority backgrounds in the video game industry.

== Concept and design ==
The development of Alex Chen as a character represented a joint effort by various team members at Deck Nine. The writing team was led by senior staff writer Felice Kuan, whereas the narrative of True Colors is directed by Jonathan Zimmerman. The team knew early in the development of True Colors that they wanted to explore empathy as a key concept, and were particularly interested in pushing that concept as far as they could. The team wanted a protagonist who would have some vulnerability around empathy and around emotion at the beginning of the game's story, a character “who had some growing to do, who maybe had a relationship with an emotion that wasn’t entirely healthy", which could be explored throughout the course of a game that ultimately leads to greater self-acceptance. The team's creative process behind Alex's story arc involved a significant amount of introspection into their own personal perspectives and an objective consideration of the type of experiences that would be valuable and impactful to play through. For Kuan, she believed that her first-hand educational background in musical theater writing likely shaped her vision of Alex “on a subconscious level.”

The developers intended for the plot of True Colors, and Alex’s own relationship with her power, to be intertwined. The death of her brother Gabe Chen serves as the inciting incident for Alex to confront her inner demons and fears, setting her on a journey to gradually accept who she is, including her power, and how she chooses to navigate her life moving forward despite the burdens of her past. According to Kuan, a thematic connection between each of the superpowered protagonists of the Life is Strange series is how their lives and experiences are reflected in their abilities as "meditations on real experiences that regular people go through". In the case of Alex, her empathy is a supernatural version of an emotional experience that an average person could feel, whether it is a memory of helping a friend or loved one through an emotionally challenging time, but she could be overwhelmed by the rush of emotions from an external source if she is not careful, changing everything inside and around her. Players could experience the process of how she came to value her abilities and perspectives, even though they had long been a source of her trauma, and then influence how she decides to use them, whether to solve problems or as a way for her to come to terms with her own past.

Alex's ability to access the innermost thoughts of other people about a given issue gave the development team an opportunity to come up with different aesthetics for each distinct emotional state. The team's sound designers, environment artists, and cinematic artists sought to lean into the paranormal and surreal while ensuring that their contributions remained firmly grounded in real human experiences. A noteworthy component for the team to consider was in the depiction of the lingering after-effects that surrounds Alex once she is free of the supernatural grip of another person's emotional state. It was decided that she is always changed internally to some extent even as the moment dies down, because her feelings of anger, fear, or grief about things in her own life had been brought out in such situations in spite of her best efforts to suppress her emotional outbursts. Kuan remarked that there was often a lot of thought and discussion in the writers’ room about whether this heightened empathy would make a person kinder or more bitter overall, because there are so many scenarios that could drive a personality towards one or the other. The writers noted that Alex came into focus through their work and through working with her actress, and ultimately decided that she is a morally good person at her core. Kuan explained that as a result, writing Alex required a lot of care and nuance because she is not supposed to lose her own identity in the moments where she is reacting to the intensity of another person’s emotional state while simultaneously feeling it herself. Kuan also took care to ensure that Alex does not succumb to her own victimhood throughout her arc by highlighting the moments when Alex is not caught up in the violent emotional state of another person, where she could display the "chill, wry, and down-to-earth" aspects of her personality.

To convey how intertwined the hardships of Alex’s past history were with her power and her background, the writing team at Deck Nine spoke to consultants and drew from experiences of those who had been in foster care to inform Alex's backstory as a ward of the Helping Hands group, a foster care home that she resided in for eight years prior to the events of True Colors. Besides working details from expert consultations as story references, the team also tried to draw from the attitudes and experiences of Tristan, an individual who had been in the foster care system. Kuan noted in particular that Tristan spoke of many joyful moments in his description of his experiences, which she felt is a compelling aspect of the foster care backstory the team wanted to build for Alex. The peripheral elements that explore her past experiences, such as SMS messages, reinforces "how much of an outsider she does feel, not just from Haven, but from people in general."

=== Portrayal ===
"From a performance perspective, I've experienced loss and grief, rejection and fear, and disappointment – all the strong emotions that Alex goes through, I've been there. So I would locate where the sensation for each of those emotions was located in my body and I would access that during those particular scenes. It allowed me the freedom to stay in the scene, accessing that emotion in a genuine way without deviating from the script or Alex's context. It also made the process of repeatedly going to those deeply emotional places safe, because I wasn't retraumatising myself by reliving the events in my personal life that had made me feel those emotions in the first place"

— Erika Mori, "Life is Strange: True Colors interview – "diversity in art is so important"

Erika Mori, who played Alex Chen in True Colors, was discovered in a local acting class led by one of the game’s casting directors, Silvia Gregory. In an interview with Inverse, Mori admitted that she was initially unfamiliar with narrative adventure video games in general, and was unaware that her participation would in fact lead to a proper audition for True Colors until she received callbacks from the team at Deck Nine to inquire about her interest in the role. Mori described the entire development process for Alex as a collaborative effort, as she was given a lot of creative freedom to portray Alex as she saw fit: once the game's directors gave her some background to set up a scene, she was often allowed to play the role without specific direction when the cameras start to roll.

Mori developed Alex's character as an outcast whose negative experiences with her psychic power of empathy left her feeling unsafe or unsure about her interactions with others in the manner which many would deem conventional. She is envisioned as one who lives in constant fear that an emotional outburst from people around her will overwhelm her in a negative way, and that it impacts her in a way that it might not with her peers. To Mori, "shunning of the parts of ourselves that we deem as other" is a very universal human perspective, which is also part of a maturation process for most individuals as they grow and move through the world. Recognizing the ways in which that a game like True Colors could connect with players and allows immersive storytelling, Mori interpreted Alex's character arc as one where she discovers a way to "healthfully" access these emotions without losing herself. In an interview with GamesRadar, Mori differentiated Alex's power of empathy from that of sympathy: once Alex is takes on or experiences the emotions of others, not only is she feeling their contextualized experience, but her own emotions are also drawn out from her internally. As explained by Mori, Alex's supernatural power forges a bond with whomever she is interacting with and provides a clarity into her ability to see another person in depth. In her view, Alex never stops trying to find community and to find connection, and that she maintains an underlying hope and positivity in spite of her difficult circumstances, qualities which she believed made her a compelling and relatable character.

Mori drew from her personal experiences for Alex Chen: she described them as her own "personal failures, triumphs, and joys", brought forth in a "healthy way" to help provide shape and nuance to Alex. She felt that these experiences helped make some moments "real and authentic" in their "deep, intense, emotional, empathic" aspects. Among Mori's relevant real-life life experiences is her closeness to her own brother: a scene depicting Alex’s response to Gabe’s death was an important part of the audition process, and Mori felt that imagining the grief of losing her brother would not have been possible if she did not have her own relationship with her younger brother as a reference points. From Kuan's perspective, Mori's involvement enhanced Alex's "adorable" and "appealing" visual design, because she developed an approach to ground the character as an endearing or relatable personality who still remains hopeful for her future.

"The writers were in the room when we were mo-capping; we definitely found that we could present a situation and, rather than write reactive dialogue, we could just let Erika react and whatever was on her face was often enough to share what she was feeling more than words, perhaps. So we quickly got used to that process of just writing in a more organic way and seeing how much we could bring out of the facial expression to the moments instead of words."

— Felice Kuan, "Life is Strange: True Colors – How Deck Nine Games hopes to create an authentic and relatable protagonist in Alex Chen"

Mori's performance was directed by Webb Pickersgillo using performance capture technology, with the writers being present throughout the process. According to both Kuan and Mori, that the technology the team accessed for the development of True Colors is sufficiently advanced to capture the full extent of the latter's performance. This allowed more nuanced reactions from Mori to be translated into different situations within the game's story, and help maintain the emotional resonance for the transition to the voice over stage of development, where steps would be taken to ensure that the voiced line of dialogue would match up with what the actors were physically doing. Kuan explained that the technology, along with Mori's insights and performance, greatly influenced the development of Alex as the writing team was working on the story. This allowed the writing team to pull back their work and deliver scenes much more akin to a movie or play in their velocity and nuance, as a simple facial expression or gesture by Mori in response to a specific scenario may achieve a better result then efforts to write reactive dialogue. Portraying the character through performance capture was a rewarding experience for Mori, as it allowed her to fully express the power of her imagination and explore the potential for Alex's physicality via her background in dance.

The singing voice of Alex during the game’s musical interludes is provided by mxmtoon, who indirectly collaborated with Mori throughout the developmental process. In an interview with Inverse, mxmtoon explained that recording a studio session is different than recording for a game as she would be writing specifically for Alex as opposed to writing for herself. She described a "DIY" or trial-and-error approach to the process, but would defer to Mori's perspective if necessary as she is considered to be the "heart" of the character: she would listen to audio clips to learn more about how Mori would present Alex’s mannerisms and way of speaking.

While Alex is a member of a sexual minority like many previous Life is Strange protagonists, she is the series' first Asian American lead. Kuan sought input from other Asian-American developers at the studio to enhance the depiction of the Chen family's Chinese-Vietnamese cultural background across the creative spectrum, "from dialogue and art assets to the nuances of casting". Mori was pleased that Alex represents a protagonist that is uncommon in the video game industry, "a whole basket of diversity" in her words, as her unconventionality extends beyond superficial elements such as race, gender, body shape and sexual orientation. While their similar cultural background is gratifying for Mori as she recalled a historical lack of representation in popular culture and entertainment for people of Asian descent, she tried to resonate with other aspects of Alex’s identity during her performance, such as an unloved child who grew up in foster care, as a sibling with a long lost brother, and as a queer person. A self-professed fan of the Life is Strange series, mxmtoon said it was "really easy with Alex Chen as a character to embody what she's going through" due to the fact that they are both Asian American and of a similar age, who identify as a member of a sexual minority.

== Promotion ==
Alex Chen was prominently featured in Microsoft's promotional efforts for the Asian American and Pacific Islander Heritage Month in May 2022, particularly on banner advertisements for the Xbox Game Pass service that featured Asian video game characters and developers.

== Reception ==
Alex was met with an enthusiastic reception from players following the official reveal of True Colors in early 2021. Andrew Webster from The Verge noted that quality fan art about the character had been widely shared by April 2021, well before the launch of True Colors in September 2021. Heather Wald concurred and observed that there was already an "outpouring of love" for Alex soon after True Color was announced, which in her opinion "reiterated just how meaningful and significant it is to see ourselves reflected in the games we play". Commenting on the initial fan reaction towards Alex, Mori remarked that many players could find points of commonality and relatability from her story arc, regardless of whether they share any tangibe similarities with the character. She took the view that the character carries what she described a "buoyancy of hope" in the face of her difficult past and the death of her brother, as well as her refusal to let that part of herself be diminished in response to negative stimuli, made her "very easy to love and to root for”.

Preview articles by commentators about True Colors often focused on the game's opening cutscene. Wald was astonished by the ease of which she could accurately assess Alex's feelings without the need for her to say very much at all, as her short verbal responses are contrasted by her highly expressive facial and body language. Liana Ruppert from Game Informer highlighted Alex's subtle eye movements and hesitancy in her voice, and lauded the developers of True Colors for taking the emotionally raw experience the Life is Strange series is well known for and raising it to a better standard. Carrie Talbot from PCGamesN was impressed by how authentic and well translated her movements and style are in another scene, which creates a "real sense of human depth to her character on screen".

Alex Chen was met with critical acclaim following the release of True Colors. She was named Best LGBTQ Character at the Gayming Awards 2022, and was a nominee for the Outstanding Achievement in Character award at the 25th Annual D.I.C.E. Awards. Erika Mori's work as Alex was named Best Performance by EDGE Magazine for their 2021 awards. Mori also earned multiple best performance award nominations from the Golden Joystick Awards 2021, The Game Awards 2021, the 18th British Academy Games Awards, and the 2022 NAVGTR Awards. Alex is named among Destructoid staff’s favorite new video game characters of 2021, with staff member Noelle Warner praising the character as an exemplary player character in a story-driven game who feels complex, realized, and likeable. Kimberley Wallace from Game Informer considered Alex to be one of the best video game characters in recent memory. Madeline Carpou from The Mary Sue included Alex in her 2021 list of the most inspiring female video game characters, and in the following year IGN staff named Alex among their favorite LGBTQ Characters in video games. Carpou also lauded mxmtoon's musical contributions as Alex's singing voice, and singled out her cover of “Blister in the Sun” for praise. Erika Mori's performance was a nominee for the best video game performances of 2021 by IGN staff, with Mitchell Saltzman complimenting Mori for portraying Alex's qualities impeccably in both her voice acting and performance capture. Carolyn Petit from Kotaku wrote in December 2021 that she was very impressed by the expressive range of Alex's face and the subtlety of her reactions, and called it her "favorite video game special effect of 2021".

Writing for Gayming Magazine, Harri Chan praised the portrayal of Alex's relationship with her emotions in True Colors as "uplifting" for Asian American representation, particularly with how it handles the stigma surrounding mental health within immigrant families. On the other hand, Brian Hendershot from TheGamer argued that the lack of overt racism faced by Alex in the story of True Colors was "out of touch with reality" in light of the rise of hate crimes against Asian Americans in the 2020s.
