= Snow (Angus & Julia Stone album) =

Studio album by Angus & Julia Stone
- Released: 15 September 2017
- Studio: Byron Bay cottage studio
- Length: 52:36
- Label: EMI
- Producer: Angus & Julia Stone

Angus & Julia Stone chronology
Angus & Julia Stone (2014)	Snow (2017)	Life Is Strange (2021)

Singles from Snow
- 1. "Snow" Released: 13 June 2017; 2. "Chateau" Released: 24 August 2017; 3. "Cellar Door" Released: 17 November 2017; 4. "Nothing Else" Released: June 2018

Snow is the fourth studio album by Australian singer-songwriter duo Angus & Julia Stone. It was released on 15 September 2017 by EMI in Australia and Nettwerk in the United States. It was preceded by the release of the title track and "Chateau" as singles. "Chateau" was accompanied by a video directed by Jessie Hill. The album was written entirely by the duo and recorded at Angus Stone's Byron Bay cottage studio after it was suggested by Rick Rubin, who produced their 2014 self-titled album.

Two of the album's tracks were voted into the Triple J Hottest 100, 2017: "Chateau" at number three and "Snow" at number 98.

At the ARIA Music Awards of 2018, the album was nominated for two awards; Best Blues and Roots Album and Best Independent Release.

== Production ==
Julia Stone commented that the duo had never written a whole album by themselves, nor spent as much time making an album alone together, saying: "That was the first time that we actually started writing together, in the same room [...] the last phase of writing and recording was just eight weeks of him and me and the quiet of the land." Ideas for the album came about while the duo were in Switzerland, and the album was recorded at Angus' Byron Bay studio over a period of approximately six months. Songs originated from "jam sessions" with friends who were at the pair's home. Angus and Julia included a song about their late grandfather on the album, titled "Cellar Door", as he had helped inspire them to become a band; the track is about Angus revisiting his home town to sing at his funeral.

The album incorporates new instrumentation for the duo: the use of a drum machine and "a more expansive guitar palette". It also incorporates the use of a $150 organ the pair bought from an advertisement on the opening track, "Snow". The track "Sylvester Stallone" includes lyrics referring to a lover who slurs their speech when drunk, and "Sleep Alone" was created after a "'speed-date' songwriting session" with an unnamed DJ, where the duo abandoned the programmed beat but kept the lyrics.

== Critical reception ==
Professional ratings
Aggregate scores
Source	Rating
AnyDecentMusic?	5.5/10
Review scores
Source	Rating
AllMusic	4/5 stars
The Irish Times	2/5 stars
The Line of Best Fit	7.5/10
The Music AU	4/5 stars
The Observer	3/5 stars
Renowned for Sound	4.5/5 stars
Rolling Stone Australia	3.5/5 stars

Darren Levin from Rolling Stone Australia complimented the "call-and-response" of "Snow", saying: "The Stones are at their best when they're playing off each other like this: Julia providing the strong but sympathetic counterpoint to her brother's just-rolled-out-of-a-two-day-bender version of charm." He gave the record three-and-a-half stars out of five, concluding: "They're stronger together – they just realise it now." Lauren Murphy of The Irish Times was less positive, giving the record two out of five stars, writing: "Beige might be a more appropriate title for Angus and Julia Stone's fourth album [...] their songs are bland creations, dripping with laboured pretence, as heard on 'Sleep Alone' and the lacklustre 'Baudelaire'. Only the Springsteen-esque shimmer of guitar on 'Who Do You Think You Are?' inspires any emotional response." She summarised that the album was "studied nonchalance with no real identity of its own".

== Track listing ==
All tracks are written by Angus Stone and Julia Stone.

No.	Title	Length
1.	"Snow"	4:12
2.	"Oakwood"	3:43
3.	"Chateau"	4:33
4.	"Cellar Door"	4:41
5.	"Sleep Alone"	4:29
6.	"Make It Out Alive"	3:17
7.	"Who Do You Think You Are"	6:51
8.	"Nothing Else"	4:24
9.	"My House Your House"	4:42
10.	"Bloodhound"	3:58
11.	"Baudelaire"	4:14
12.	"Sylvester Stallone"	3:32
Total length:		52:36

== Personnel ==
Angus & Julia Stone

- Angus Stone – vocals, production (all tracks), bass (1, 3), guitar (2, 4–6, 9–12), organ (4, 7), cigar box bass (8), engineering (3)
- Julia Stone – vocals, production (all tracks); guitar (1, 7, 8, 12), drums (2, 4), organ (5), piano (9), trumpet (11), engineering (1, 2, 4–7, 9, 10, 12)

Additional musicians

- Thomas Bartlet – keyboards (all tracks), drum programming (2, 3, 5–7, 9–12)
- Ben Edgar – drums (track 1), guitar (2, 3, 6, 7, 9–11)
- Daniel Farrugia – organ (track 1), drums (3, 5–7, 9–12)
- Dann Hume – bass (tracks 2, 4–10)
- Matt Johnson – drums (tracks 3, 5, 11)
- Mikey Bee – group backing vocals (tracks 3, 9)
- Vinnie Laduce – group backing vocals (tracks 3, 9)
- Rohin Brown – chorus backing vocals (track 4)
- Eric Coelho – group backing vocals (tracks 6, 7), bass (11, 12)
- Stefan José – group backing vocals (tracks 6, 7)
- Ross Irwin – trumpet (tracks 8, 11)
- Pete Wilkins – drums (track 8)
- Fiona Franklin – group backing vocals (track 9)
- Maria Stratton – group backing vocals (track 9)
- Mylee Grace – group backing vocals (track 9)

Technical

- Greg Calbi – mastering
- John O'Mahony – mixing (tracks 1, 2)
- Eric J Dubowsky – mixing (tracks 3–12)
- Adam Rhodes – engineering (tracks 1, 2, 4–7, 9, 10, 12)
- Paul Pilsneniks – engineering (tracks 1, 2, 4–7, 9, 10, 12)
- Dann Hume – engineering (tracks 1, 2, 5–9)
- Eric Coelho – engineering (tracks 3, 4, 6, 7, 10, 11)
- Daniel Farrugia – engineering (track 3)
- James Yost – engineering (track 11)
- Tim Watt – mixing assistance (tracks 3–12)

== Charts ==
=== Weekly charts ===
Chart (2017)	Peak position
Australian Albums (ARIA)	2
Austrian Albums (Ö3 Austria)	51
Belgian Albums (Ultratop Flanders)	16
Belgian Albums (Ultratop Wallonia)	11
Canadian Albums (Billboard)	64
Dutch Albums (Album Top 100)	17
French Albums (SNEP)	10
German Albums (Offizielle Top 100)	21
New Zealand Albums (RMNZ)	13
Scottish Albums (Official Charts)	53
Swiss Albums (Schweizer Hitparade)	11
UK Albums (Official Charts)	98
US Heatseekers Albums (Billboard)	18

=== Year-end charts ===
Chart (2017)	Position
Australian Albums (ARIA)	100
Chart (2018)	Position
Australian Albums (ARIA)	96

== Certifications ==
Region	Certification	Certified units/sales
Australia (ARIA)	Gold	35,000^{‡}
France (SNEP)	Gold	50,000^{‡}
New Zealand (RMNZ)	Gold	7,500^{‡}
^{‡} Sales+streaming figures based on certification alone.
