= Snow (Angus & Julia Stone song) =

2017 single by Angus & Julia Stone

Single by Angus and Julia Stone

from the album Snow
- Released: 13 June 2017
- Length: 4:10
- Songwriter(s): Angus Stone; Julia Stone
- Producer(s): Angus Stone; Julia Stone

Angus and Julia Stone singles chronology
"The Hanging Tree" (2015)	"Snow" (2017)	"Chateau" (2017)

"Snow" is a song by Australian singer-songwriters Angus & Julia Stone, released on 13 June 2017 as the lead single from their fourth studio album Snow (2017).

== Track listing ==
Digital release
No.	Title	Length
1.	"Snow"	4:10

== Charts ==
Chart (2017)	Peak position
France (SNEP)	116

== Certifications ==
Region	Certification	Certified units/sales
Australia (ARIA)	Platinum	70,000^{‡}
^{‡} Sales+streaming figures based on certification alone.
