= Karaoke Bar =

Studio album by Angus & Julia Stone
- Released: 4 September 2026
- Length: 35:10
- Labels: Angus & Julia Stone; Virgin
- Producers: Angus Stone; Julia Stone

Angus & Julia Stone chronology
Cape Forestier (2024)	Karaoke Bar (2026)

Singles from Karaoke Bar
- 1. "Karaoke Bar" Released: 8 May 2026; 2. "Monroe" Released: 26 June 2026; 3. "Celestial Bodies" Released: 31 July 2026; 4. "The Cherry Farm" Released: 28 August 2026

Karaoke Bar is the sixth studio album by the Australian singer-songwriter duo Angus & Julia Stone. The album was announced in May 2026 alongside the release of the title track. It was released on 4 September 2026.

The album was created across multiple locations in Greece, France and Australia and the album is shaped by the people and places they encountered.

The album will be supported with an Australian tour commencing in February 2027.

== Reception ==
Chris Bound from Mystic Sons scored the album 8/10 saying, "Karaoke Bar doesn't radically overhaul their sound, but it does feel refreshed by travel, spontaneity and a greater sense of ease. Warm, varied and beautifully paced, it captures Angus & Julia Stone continuing to find new emotional territory inside a musical language that has long since become distinctly their own."

== Track listing ==
All lyrics and music are written by Angus Stone and Julia Stone, except "Karaoke Bar" (lyrics by Angus Stone, Julia Stone, and Neil Diamond).

Karaoke Bar track listing
No.	Title	Length
1.	"Karaoke Bar"	3:24
2.	"Monroe"	3:40
3.	"Celestial Bodies"	3:47
4.	"The Start"	3:16
5.	"Strangely Strangely"	3:28
6.	"Brightest Place"	3:14
7.	"Take Me Back to Japan"	4:12
8.	"Cowgirls Lover Boi"	3:01
9.	"The Cherry Farm"	2:58
10.	"Mexico City"	4:10
Total length:		35:10

== Personnel ==
Credits are adapted from Tidal.

=== Angus & Julia Stone ===
- Angus Stone – vocals, production, engineering (all tracks); bass (tracks 1, 3, 5, 10); acoustic guitar, Mellotron (5)
- Julia Stone – vocals, production, engineering

=== Additional contributors ===
- Paul Pilseniks – engineering
- Eric J Dubowsky – mixing
- Brian Lucey – mastering
- Leigh Fisher – engineering (1–3, 5–10), drum programming (1), drums (2–10), percussion (2, 4, 10), synthesizer (3–8)
- Thomas Bartlett – piano (all tracks), engineering (1–3, 5–7, 9, 10), synthesizer (1), Mellotron (2–7, 9, 10), Rhodes piano (8)
- Larissa Lewis – background vocals (1)
- Mia Lewis – background vocals (1)
- Olivia Lewis – background vocals (1)
- Ben Edgar – guitars, engineering (2–5, 7–10); electric guitar, slide guitar (2); timpani (8)
- Luke Hodgson – bass (6)

== Charts ==
Chart performance for Karaoke Bar
Chart (2026)	Peak position
Australian Albums (ARIA)	1
French Albums (SNEP)	139
Scottish Albums (Official Charts)	32
Swiss Albums (Schweizer Hitparade)	98
UK Albums Sales (Official Charts)	24
UK Independent Albums (Official Charts)	9
