= Heart Beats Slow =

Single by Angus and Julia Stone

from the album Angus & Julia Stone
- Released: 27 May 2014
- Length: 4:01
- Songwriter(s): Angus Stone, Julia Stone
- Producer(s): Rick Rubin

Angus and Julia Stone singles chronology
| "For You" (2011) | "Heart Beats Slow" (2014) | "Death Defying Acts" (2014) |

"Heart Beats Slow" is a song by Australian singer songwriters Angus & Julia Stone. It was released in May 2014 as the lead single from the duo's third studio album Angus & Julia Stone. The song peaked at number 37 on the ARIA Charts.

The music video was directed by Jessie Hill and released in May 2014.

== Reception ==
Lachlan Kanoniuk from Beat Magazine said "The new track from Angus & Julia Stone is superpowered in its insipidness, immune to criticism by virtue of commanding 100 per cent focus during listening due to its sheer un-remarkability, then by its resoundingly unmemorable nature, it's impossible to retain any knowledge of the track while putting pen to paper."

== Track listing ==
Digital release
| No. | Title | Length |
|---|---|---|
| 1. | "Heart Beats Slow" (radio edit) | 4:01 |

== Charts ==
| Chart (2014) | Peak position |
|---|---|
| Australia (ARIA) | 37 |

== Certifications ==
| Region | Certification | Certified units/sales |
|---|---|---|
| Australia (ARIA) | Platinum | 70,000^{‡} |
^{‡} Sales+streaming figures based on certification alone.
