= Sixty Summers =

Studio album by Julia Stone
- Released: 30 April 2021
- Recorded: 2015–2019
- Length: 43:35
- Label: BMG
- Producer: Julia Stone; Doveman; St. Vincent

Julia Stone chronology
| By the Horns (2012) | Sixty Summers (2021) | Everything is Christmas (2021) |

Singles from Sixty Summers
- 1. "Break" Released: 16 July 2020; 2. "Unreal" Released: 4 September 2020; 3. "Dance" Released: 30 October 2020; 4. "We All Have" Released: 29 January 2021; 5. "Fire in Me" Released: 19 March 2021

Sixty Summers is the third studio album by Australian singer-songwriter Julia Stone. The album was announced on 30 October 2020 alongside the release of the album's third single, "Dance", and was released on 30 April 2021.

== Background and recording ==
The album was recorded sporadically between 2015 and 2019 and was shaped by Stone's key collaborators on the album, Doveman, and St. Vincent. Together, Bartlett and Stone wrote and recorded over 50 demos in his studio in New York, Stone said "Making this record with Thomas, I felt so free. I can hear it in the music, he brings a sense of confidence to recording sessions." Clark, once presented with the work Bartlett and Stone had made together, fashioned Sixty Summers into the album it is, contributing vocals and guitar in addition to production.

== Critical reception ==
Professional ratings
Aggregate scores
| Source | Rating |
|---|---|
| Metacritic | 82/100 |
Review scores
| Source | Rating |
| Evening Standard | 4/5 stars |
| Gigwise | 6/10 stars |
| The Independent | 4/5 stars |
| NME | 3/5 stars |

Upon release, Sixty Summers received "universal acclaim" from critics, achieving a score of 82 on Metacritic based on 4 reviews. A four star review from The Independent praised Stone for reinventing herself, with the album being called "a celebration of newly claimed liberty". The Evening Standard described the album's sound as "on a whole new planet" and made comparisons to the Taylor Swift album Folklore, with the two albums sharing collaborators in Thomas Bartlett and Matt Berninger. In a more mixed review, Gigwise praised Stone for "eagerness to embrace a more elated sound is wholly admirable" but that "certain lyrical ideas sit a touch on the nose". David James Young from NME said the music is "some of the most interesting music she's ever made".

=== Mid-year lists ===
Sixty Summers on mid-year lists
| Publication | List | Rank | Ref. |
|---|---|---|---|
| The Music | The Music's Top 25 Albums Of 2021 (So Far) | — | |

== Track listing ==
All tracks written by Julia Stone and Thomas Bartlett, except where noted.

Sixty Summers track listing
| No. | Title | Writer(s) | Producer(s) | Length |
|---|---|---|---|---|
| 1. | "Break" | | Stone; Doveman; St. Vincent | 3:23 |
| 2. | "Sixty Summers" | Stone; Kaelyn Behr | Stone; Doveman; St. Vincent | 3:19 |
| 3. | "We All Have" (featuring Matt Berninger) | | Stone; Doveman; St. Vincent | 2:39 |
| 4. | "Substance" | Stone; Celia Pavey; Daniel Cobbe | Stone; Doveman; St. Vincent; Dann Hume^{[a]}; Matt Neighbour^{[a]} | 3:01 |
| 5. | "Dance" | | Stone; Doveman; St. Vincent | 2:59 |
| 6. | "Free" | Stone; Megan McInerney; Cobbe | Stone; Doveman; St. Vincent; Hume^{[a]} | 2:46 |
| 7. | "Who" | | Stone; Doveman; St. Vincent | 3:00 |
| 8. | "Fire in Me" | Stone; Cobbe | Stone; Doveman; St. Vincent | 2:34 |
| 9. | "Easy" | | Stone; Doveman; St. Vincent | 3:51 |
| 10. | "Queen" | Stone | Doveman; St. Vincent | 2:51 |
| 11. | "Heron" | | Stone; Doveman; St. Vincent | 2:58 |
| 12. | "Unreal" | | Stone; Doveman; St. Vincent | 3:29 |
| 13. | "I Am No One" | | Stone; Doveman; St. Vincent | 3:44 |
| 14. | "Dance" (French version) (bonus track) | | | 3:01 |
| Total length: | | | | 43:35 |

== Charts ==
Chart performance for Sixty Summers
| Chart (2021) | Peak position |
|---|---|
| Australian Albums (ARIA) | 16 |
| Belgian Albums (Ultratop Flanders) | 192 |
| Belgian Albums (Ultratop Wallonia) | 183 |
| German Albums (Offizielle Top 100) | 64 |
| Scottish Albums (OCC) | 60 |
| Swiss Albums (Schweizer Hitparade) | 79 |
