= Life Is Strange: True Colors =

2021 graphic adventure video game

- Developer: Deck Nine (Note: Dragon's Lake Entertainment developed the Switch version.)
- Publisher: Square Enix
- Director: Zak Garriss
- Producer: David Lawrence Hein
- Designers: Christopher Sica; Chris Floyd; Jeremiah Warm
- Programmer: Todd Bolinger
- Artist: Andrew Weatherl
- Writer: Jonathan Zimmerman
- Composers: Angus & Julia Stone; Novo Amor; mxmtoon
- Series: Life Is Strange
- Engine: Unreal Engine 4
- Platforms: PlayStation 4; PlayStation 5; Windows; Xbox One; Xbox Series X/S; Stadia; Nintendo Switch
- Release: 10 September 2021; Nintendo Switch; 7 December 2021
- Genre: Adventure
- Mode: Single-player

Life Is Strange: True Colors is a 2021 adventure game in the Life is Strange series, developed by Deck Nine and published by Square Enix. The plot focuses on Alex Chen, a young woman who can experience the emotions of others, as she tries to solve the mystery behind a tragedy that happened in her life.

It was released on 10 September 2021 for PlayStation 4, PlayStation 5, Windows, Xbox One, Xbox Series X/S, and Stadia; a Nintendo Switch version released on 7 December 2021. Unlike previous entries in the series, it was released in its entirety while still being structured into chapters. It received generally favorable reviews from critics, who praised the game's characters, writing, story themes, voice acting, and facial animations; but criticized its pacing, repetitive environments, and lack of impactful choices.

== Gameplay ==
By holding a button, the player can see the emotions of a character.

Life Is Strange: True Colors is a graphic adventure played from a third-person view. The player controls the protagonist, Alex Chen, to explore various locations in the fictional setting of Haven Springs and communicate with non-playable characters through the conversation system based on dialogue trees. Alex has psychic empathy powers that allow her to read and manipulate emotions, which she perceives as colorful auras, to physically see how others feel around her at the cost of being "infected" by their emotions. Some of the non-player characters will have more intense auras indicating trauma or hardship they may be going through. When Alex interacts with them, this creates a "nova" that appears to transform the world around Alex and the character to reflect elements of this trauma, giving the opportunity for the player to figure out what caused their emotions and to opt to guide Alex in helping to comfort the character.

== Plot ==
In April 2019, Alexandra "Alex" Chen leaves a foster care group home after eight years to reunite with her brother Gabriel "Gabe" Chen in Haven Springs, Colorado. Gabe shows Alex around Haven; many of the townspeople are employed by Typhon, a mining company. Subsequently, Alex meets park ranger Ryan Lucan, radio DJ Stephanie "Steph" Gingrich, (Note: Katy Bentz reprises her role as Steph, having previously appeared in Life Is Strange: Before the Storm) local bar owner and Ryan's father Jedediah "Jed" Lucan, flower shop owner Eleanor Lethe, her granddaughter Riley, Gabe's girlfriend Charlotte Harmon and her son Ethan, the town's sheriff deputy Jason Pike, taxidermist Reginald "Duckie" McCalister III, Typhon Mining's mine safety manager Mac Loudon, and Typhon's operations director Diane Jacobs.

While Gabe shows Alex his apartment and offers it as a gift to her, they are interrupted by Mac, who wrongfully believes Gabe is having an affair with his girlfriend Riley and attacks him. The altercation causes Alex's "emotions" to snap, resulting in her attacking Mac to defend Gabe. Later, Ryan informs Alex and Gabe that Ethan has gone missing. The three search the forest for Ethan as Gabe calls Typhon to cancel a scheduled blast in the nearby mountain. Alex rescues Ethan, but the blast goes ahead anyway; the resulting landslide knocks Gabe into a canyon, plummeting him to his death.

Attempting to find answers about the circumstances around Gabe's death, Alex uses her powers on Mac, who was working the night of the explosion and claims not to have received Gabe's call. She discovers that Mac attempted to act on the call, but his superiors at Typhon overruled and let the blast go off; the company is now actively covering up their role in Gabe's death and forcing him to keep quiet. Enlisting the aid of Ryan and Steph, Alex turns her attention to Diane and steals her USB drive, which contains a recording of Gabe's call and a message from Diane's superior coercing her to ignore the situation and proceed as planned. Alex is later arrested by Pike for theft and computer fraud, but is released after either signing an affidavit to drop her investigation or removing Pike's fear of Typhon with her powers.

Jed takes Alex to an abandoned mineshaft and confesses that twelve years ago, he was at fault for the deaths of several miners he oversaw as a foreman, which caused him to make a deal with Typhon to cover up the tragedy to protect himself and his family. He shoots at Alex; although he narrowly misses, the gunshot causes her to fall into the shaft.

Alex survives the fall but is badly injured. She experiences flashbacks of her childhood, showing her mother's death from cancer, her father's abandonment, and her time in foster care. Searching for a way out, she finds the site where the miners died and discovers her childhood necklace, realizing her father was one of the men killed in the accident. Escaping the mine, Alex barges into the town council meeting and reveals Jed's role in both the mining disaster and Gabe's death and Typhon's attempts to cover it up, while Jed and Diane attempt to discredit her. After Steph, Charlotte, Duckie, Eleanor, Pike, and Ryan either support or side against Alex based on her past choices, Alex uses her powers on Jed, resulting in Jed seeing the truth of his actions and confessing to the police, ending Typhon's operations.

Following these events, Alex visualizes a conversation with a vision of Gabe and ultimately decides whether to remain in Haven Springs or leave to seek adventure as a musician, either alone or alongside Ryan or Steph.

=== Wavelengths ===
In March 2018, Steph gets a job as the DJ host of Haven Springs' KRCT radio station after having lied about her work experience and manages the record store that contains the broadcasting room. She stays in Haven after breaking up with her bandmate Izzie from Seattle, where she moved shortly after the events of the first Life Is Strange game, and is forced to take the job after losing a foosball game to Gabe, preventing her from moving to Denver as she originally planned. Over a year's time, Steph modernizes the radio program and record store and uses her time to search for a date and play a tabletop game with her former best friend Mikey North (Dillon Winfrey, also reprising his role from Before the Storm). If Chloe Price was sacrificed in the first game, Steph mourns Chloe's and Rachel Amber's death; if Arcadia Bay was sacrificed, Steph mourns her mother and Mikey's brother Drew's death due to the storm; both endings culminate in her lashing out at Mikey on the fifth anniversary of the tumultuous events. When Mikey professes how he needs her in his life as his best friend, Steph then apologizes and admits that she stops people from getting close because she is too traumatized from all the past pain. She admits she needs Mikey too and vows to become a better friend to him. On New Year's Eve, she searches for a new job as a DJ back in Seattle, follows her friends' scavenger hunt, and is asked by Gabe about contacting his sister Alex. In April 2019, Steph sees Alex arrive in the record store (as seen in the main game).

== Development ==
Deck Nine, which had previously developed the first game's prequel Before the Storm, began work on True Colors in 2017. The development team were certain of the general theme they wanted to explore, which is empathy, before they had settled on a main character or even a story for the game. On 18 March 2021, Square Enix revealed the game as part of a live digital presentation, along the announcement of Life Is Strange Remastered Collection containing remastered versions of the original Life Is Strange and its prequel Before the Storm for release later that year. With the announcement of True Colors, Eurogamer observed that Dontnod's time with the franchise was over and that the Life Is Strange series have been passed to Deck Nine. A Nintendo Switch version of the game along with Life Is Strange Remastered Collection for Switch was announced during the Nintendo Direct E3 2021 presentation. On 11 August, the downloadable content (DLC) prequel story Wavelengths was announced to be released on 30 September, alongside a delay of the Remastered Collection to early 2022. The next day, the Switch version was said to be delayed to later in 2021.

"That duality of the human condition and the supernatural is part of the Life is Strange secret sauce. It's brilliant that Alex's power is basically a trait that most of us possess – empathy – but on steroids, because I think it allows the power itself to be relatable to players in a way that previous powers weren't."

— Erika Mori, "Life is Strange: True Colors interview – "diversity in art is so important".

A common theme of the Life Is Strange series has been based on characters with a type of super-human ability, though not like superheroes, that the developers can then provide "meditations on real experiences that regular people go through", according to Felice Kuan, senior writer at Deck Nine. For True Colors, they had determined early on they wanted their protagonist to be based on a power of empathy, not only to be able to sense what others were experiencing but to be vulnerable herself and would be able to grow past this as the story progressed, "giving her a path to greater self-acceptance and greater trust in her own abilities" according to Kuan. This led to creating the story around Alex losing her brother early in the game as a driver for her to explore her empathy powers and reveal more about her past as she uses them. Capturing the performances of the actors through performance capture, a first for the series, also influenced the writers' approach towards their scripting for the game's cast of characters. According to Alex's actress Erika Mori, the technology was "instrumental in successfully creating this game about empathy because it allowed us to get really high-fidelity facial expressions that were organically connected to whatever was going on with my voice and body in a particular scene."

On 20 August 2021, the game's original soundtrack was revealed to be composed by Australian duo Angus & Julia Stone. A crowd vote extension for Twitch was released for the game's before launch. On 5 September, a partnership with Critical Role was announced for Wavelengths with references to the webseries' tabletop RPG merchandise. On 29 September, Square Enix started a fundraiser for LGBT organisation OutRight Action International, with anyone donating at least $2 being entered into a draw to win a jacket designed by mxmtoon. On 5 October 2021, the game was updated to include a High Performance mode in addition to the High Resolution mode on PlayStation 5 and Xbox Series X. The latter mode will allow the game to perform at 60 frames per second (fps).

=== Music ===
In addition to the soundtrack by Angus & Julia Stone, Novo Amor composed the song "Haven", used as a theme in the game and the official trailer. The game contains covers of Radiohead's "Creep" and Violent Femmes' "Blister in the Sun" by mxmtoon, who provided Alex's singing voice. mxmtoon also created an original song called "in the darkness", and performed the song "every wave" written by the developers. Other featured artists include Phoebe Bridgers and Gabrielle Aplin. Pond, Girl in Red, Alt-J, Portugal. The Man, Foals, Kings of Leon, Hayley Kiyoko, and Maribou State contributed to Wavelengths with their music. mxmtoon released an extended play of songs for the game on 6 September 2021.

Life is Strange

Soundtrack album by Angus & Julia Stone
- Released: 20 August 2021
- Length: 45:55
- Label: BMG

Angus & Julia Stone chronology
Snow (2017)	Life is Strange (2021)	Cape Forestier (2024)

Angus & Julia Stone revealed an original soundtrack album of songs they were asked to write for the game on 15 August 2021, titled Life Is Strange and releasing 20 August. At the 2021 ARIA Music Awards, the album won Best Original Soundtrack. At the AIR Awards of 2022, the album was nominated for Best Independent Blues and Roots Album or EP. It peaked at #16 in the Australian Albums ARIA charts in 2021.

== Release ==
True Colors was released on 10 September 2021 for PlayStation 4, PlayStation 5, Windows, Xbox One, Xbox Series X and Series S, Google Stadia, and was released digitally on 7 December 2021 for the Nintendo Switch. A physical retail Switch version was released for 25 February 2022. Unlike previous mainline games in the series which have had an episodic release schedule, the game was released in its entirety at once. The game is structured in five chapters so that the player may experience the game in smaller segments. The Wavelengths DLC starring Steph was released exclusively as part of the Deluxe Edition on 30 September. A digital Ultimate Edition bundle, with access to the Life Is Strange Remastered Collection, was also available.

== Reception ==
Reception

Aggregate scores
Aggregator	Score
Metacritic	PC: 81/100; PS4: 83/100; PS5: 81/100; NS: 78/100; XSXS: 84/100
OpenCritic	82% recommend

Review scores
Publication	Score
Destructoid	9/10
Electronic Gaming Monthly	3/5
Famitsu	35/40
Game Informer	8.5/10
GameSpot	7/10
GamesRadar+	4.5/5
IGN	9/10
Nintendo Life	8/10
PC Gamer (US)	86/100
Push Square	6/10
The Guardian	3/5

Life Is Strange: True Colors received "generally favorable reviews" according to review aggregator Metacritic.

IGN praised the setting of Haven Springs, writing that the game has "arguably the best setting in any Life is Strange game to date". Game Informer liked the writing of the game, stating, "True Colors' writing is so strong that it didn't need a supernatural ability to tell this story." The reviewer put additional praise on the character of Alex Chen, calling her character "one of the best protagonists I've encountered in years". Justin Clark of GameSpot enjoyed the story's themes, feeling that some of game's interactions were "powerful" and "emotionally resonant". However he criticized what he called the "baseline niceness", describing it as "while comfortable and soothing, borders on disingenuous given the grim emotional stakes". GamesRadar+'s Heather Wald felt "the empathy power opens up a little door into the everyday lives of the small community, which makes it feel so alive". She criticized the impact of choices in the game, feeling that no matter what the player chose, the story did not change dramatically. Tom Phillips, writing for Eurogamer, felt that the improved character animations and vocal performances contributed to a better game, saying, "the game's writing and performances lift its small-town mystery so brilliantly".

=== Wavelengths ===
Reception

Aggregate score
Aggregator	Score
Metacritic	79

The PlayStation 5 version of the DLC story Wavelengths received generally favorable reviews according to Metacritic. IGN Italia described the DLC as a warm and sweet coming-of-age story for Steph with its emphasis on Steph's DJ occupation and love of role-playing games, and a fitting narrative connection between True Colors and its predecessors in the series. PLAY magazine gave a positive review, describing Steph as a "fan-favourite character", and the story of Wavelengths as an emotionally challenging one which contrasts with its soundtrack's relaxing tone.

=== Audience response ===
Chinese players review bombed the game on release in response to the presence of the flag of Tibet as part of an in-game location, on the basis of the controversy surrounding Tibet's sovereignty from China.

=== Sales ===
On 13 September 2021, Life Is Strange: True Colors debuted at #6 on the UK games boxed sales chart based on physical editions alone, with 54% of sales coming from the PS5, 28% from the PS4, and 18% from the Xbox Series X/S. In The NPD Group September 2021 games report, Life is Strange: True Colors ranked at #10 for top selling games within the US, which is the "highest launch month dollar sales for any Life is Strange title to date."

=== Accolades ===
Mori won Best Performance with Edge. Gayming Magazine selected the game as the winner of the Game of the Year and Authentic Representation Award, while Alex Chen was named Best LGBTQ Character.

Year	Award	Category	Result	Ref.
2021	Golden Joystick Awards 2021	Best Storytelling	Won	
2021	Golden Joystick Awards 2021	Best Performer (Erika Mori as Alex Chen)	Nominated	
2021	The Game Awards 2021	Best Narrative	Nominated	
2021	The Game Awards 2021	Best Performer (Erika Mori as Alex Chen)	Nominated	
2021	The Game Awards 2021	Games for Impact	Won	
2022	Game Developers Choice Awards	Social Impact Award	Nominated	
2022	11th New York Game Awards	Big Apple Award for Best Game of the Year	Nominated	
2022	11th New York Game Awards	Herman Melville Award for Best Writing in a Game	Won	
2022	11th New York Game Awards	Tin Pan Alley Award for Best Music in a Game	Nominated	
2022	11th New York Game Awards	Great White Way Award for Best Acting in a Game (Erika Mori as Alex Chen)	Nominated	
2022	25th Annual D.I.C.E. Awards	Outstanding Achievement in Character (Alex Chen)	Nominated	
2022	33rd GLAAD Media Awards	Outstanding Video Game	Won	
2022	Steam Awards	Outstanding Story-Rich Game	Nominated	
2022	18th British Academy Games Awards	Narrative	Nominated	
2022	18th British Academy Games Awards	Animation	Nominated	
2022	18th British Academy Games Awards	Performer in a Leading Role (Erika Mori as Alex Chen)	Nominated	
2022	18th British Academy Games Awards	Performer in a Supporting Role (Han Soto as Gabe Chen)	Nominated	
2022	NAVGTR Awards	Outstanding Camera Direction in a Game Engine	Won	
2022	NAVGTR Awards	Outstanding Game, Franchise Adventure	Nominated	
2022	NAVGTR Awards	Outstanding Original Light Mix Score, Franchise	Nominated	
2022	NAVGTR Awards	Outstanding Performance in a Drama, Lead (Erika Mori as Alex Chen)	Nominated	
2022	NAVGTR Awards	Outstanding Song, Original or Adapted	Nominated	
2022	NAVGTR Awards	Outstanding Writing in a Drama	Won	
2022	SXSW Gaming Awards	Matthew Crump Cultural Innovation Award	Nominated	
2022	Video Game Accessibility Awards 2021	Ability to Bypass	Won	
2022	Peabody Awards	Interactive & Immersive	Won	

== Other media ==
In July 2023, a comic book series, Life Is Strange: Forget-Me-Not, was announced for publication in December 2023. It follows Alex Chen and Steph Gingrich after the events of the game. The series is written by Zoe Thorogood.
