= The Memory Machine =

Studio album by Julia Stone
- Released: September 2010
- Recorded: New York (late 2008)
- Genre: Folk, indie rock, pop rock
- Length: 42:08
- Label: Picture Show/EMI Music (Australia), Flock/PIAS (UK), Nettwerk (USA)
- Producer: Julia Stone, Kieran Kelly

Julia Stone chronology
The Memory Machine (2010)	By the Horns (2012)

The Memory Machine is the debut studio album by Australian singer-songwriter Julia Stone. It was released in September 2010 in Australia and peaked at number 73 on the ARIA Charts.

== Reception ==
Professional ratings
Review scores
Source	Rating
The AU Review	6/10 stars

Duncan McLeod from The AU review called it "a subtle album that weaves its magic on the listener. Stone's unique vocals wash over you and warm your insides. The rich cleverness of strings, the imagery of a timid girl almost whispering into the microphone, the power in the paired back sound that highlights Stone's clever writing.". McLeod called out "Catastrophe!", "The Memory Machine", "My Baby" and "Where Does the Love Go" as the album highlights.

Craig Mathieson from Sydney Morning Herald said "The Memory Machine is a kind of liberating event, although most tracks touch on inhibition and restriction" adding "this disquieting, unexpected set is her best work yet."

Ally Carnwath from The Guardian said on her debut solo effort Stone can "indulge her more fanciful impulses" adding "But whatever mood her compositions achieve is soon nobbled by the grating effect of her ickle-girl vocals and twee lyrics."

Tom Lordan from GoldFlake Paint said the album is "a gentle, often dark and insightful journey into a young woman's life. In the album's short time frame she deals eloquently with large themes: love, sex, loneliness and the inability to feel. Her lyrics are like a child's painting after his/her parents have gone through a divorce: they're simple, tightly focused, raw and vulnerable."

== Track listing ==
The Memory Machine track listing
No.	Title	Length
1.	"This Love"	3:32
2.	"My Baby"	4:21
3.	"Winter on the Weekend"	4:41
4.	"The Memory Machine"	2:49
5.	"Catastrophe"	3:43
6.	"Maybe"	4:30
7.	"Lights Inside This Dream"	4:17
8.	"What's Wrong with Me?"	4:38
9.	"Horse With the Wings"	4:40
10.	"Where Does the Love Go?"	5:03
Total length:		42:08

== Charts ==
Chart performance for The Memory Machine
Chart (2010)	Peak position
Australian Albums (ARIA)	73
French Albums (SNEP)	137

== Release history ==
Release history and formats for The Memory Machine
Country	Date	Format	Label	Catalogue
Australia	September 2010	CD	Picture Show Records/EMI Music	9173702
United Kingdom	2010	CD, Digital download	Flock/PIAS	FLOCKCD12
USA & Canada	2011	CD	Nettwerk	06700309102-2
