= Chateau (Angus & Julia Stone song) =

Single by Angus & Julia Stone

from the album Snow
- Released: 24 August 2017
- Length: 4:33
- Songwriter(s): Angus Stone, Julia Stone
- Producer(s): Angus Stone, Julia Stone

Angus & Julia Stone singles chronology
"Snow" (2017)	"Chateau" (2017)	"Cellar Door" (2017)

"Chateau" is a song by Australian singer songwriters Angus & Julia Stone. It was released in August 2017 as the second single from the duo's fourth studio album Snow.

At the ARIA Music Awards of 2018, the song was nominated for ARIA Award for Song of the Year, and at the APRA Music Awards of 2019, the song won Blues & Roots Work of the Year. In 2025, the song ranked 88 on Triple J's 2025 "Hottest 100 of Australian Songs".

== Music video ==
The music video was directed by Jessie Hill and released on 23 August 2017. The cinematic clip follows two young rebels as they embark on a journey through Mexico City. The main characters are played by actors Dacre Montgomery and Courtney Eaton, who explore the capital by boat, visit a club and hit a wedding where everyone's glass is charged.

== Track listings ==
Digital release
No.	Title	Length
1.	"Chateau"	4:33

ARTY Remix
No.	Title	Length
1.	"Chateau" (ARTY remix)	3:47

Acoustic
No.	Title	Length
1.	"Chateau" (Acoustic)	4:34

== Charts ==
=== Weekly charts ===
Chart (2017–18)	Peak position
Australia (ARIA)	26
France (SNEP)	89

=== Year-end charts ===
Chart (2018)	Position
Australia (ARIA)	76

== Certifications ==
Region	Certification	Certified units/sales
Australia (ARIA)	7× Platinum	490,000^{‡}
Canada (Music Canada)	Platinum	80,000^{‡}
New Zealand (RMNZ)	2× Platinum	60,000^{‡}
^{‡} Sales+streaming figures based on certification alone.
