= By the Horns =

Studio album by Julia Stone
- Released: 25 May 2012
- Studio: His Studio, New York City
- Genre: Folk, Indie Rock, Pop rock
- Length: 38:07
- Label: Picture Show/EMI Music (Australia)/(UK), Nettwerk (USA)
- Producer: Thomas Bartlett, Patrick Dillett

Julia Stone chronology
The Memory Machine (2010)	By the Horns (2012)	Sixty Summers (2021)

Singles from By the Horns
- 1. "Let's Forget all the Things That We Say" Released: 20 February 2012; 2. "It's All Okay" Released: 13 April 2012; 3. "Justine" Released: 19 October 2012

By the Horns is the second studio album by Australian singer-songwriter, Julia Stone. It was released in May 2012 and peaked at number 11 on the ARIA Charts. In an interview with Beat Magazine Stone affirmed the catalyst for the songs was her break-up with her long-term partner and drummer Mitch Connelly and her attempts to come to terms with the feelings that followed.

== Reception ==
Professional ratings
Review scores
Source	Rating
AllMusic	3.5/5 stars
Clash Magazine	8/10 stars
The AU Review	7.5/10 stars

James Christopher Monger from AllMusic said "Stone's fragile voice is an acquired taste that falls somewhere between the primal affectations of Björk, the airy, pixie croon of Julee Cruise, and the throaty desperation of Stevie Nicks, but there's a soulfulness to it that lends a bit of phantom power to driving stand-out cuts like 'It's All Okay', 'With the Light' and 'Justine'.".

Clash Magazine said "With tales of broken hearts and bitter afterthoughts, the album is heavily loaded, yet the delivery is one of sensitivity and vulnerability." adding "A minimalistic musical backdrop, predominantly keyboards, allows Stone's vocal expanse to breathe and flourish. This is a clear transition from her work with brother Angus, allowing her individual expression, resulting in a work of true depth and emotion."

Sahib Hamid from the AU review called it "an introspective record which would bode well in this cold winter, sitting drinking a cup of warm tea while watching the world turn.". Hamid said "With this record, she maintains that quaky, sultry tone she's famous for, but in amongst all of this she takes more chances with her arrangements." Tom Hocknell from BBC said "Stone's second solo LP offers familiar sounds, and misses the contrast of her brother.".

== Track listing ==
No.	Title	Writer(s)	Length
1.	"Let's Forget All The Things That We Say"	Julia Stone	3:34
2.	"Bloodbuzz Ohio"	Matt Berninger, Aaron Dessner, Padma Newsome	5:09
3.	"It's All Okay"	Stone	3:53
4.	"I'm Here, I'm Not Here"	Stone	3:46
5.	"Justine"	Stone	4:33
6.	"Break Apart"	Stone	2:55
7.	"With the Light"	Stone	3:20
8.	"I Want to Live Here"	Stone	4:17
9.	"By the Horns"	Stone	4:02
10.	"The Line That Ties Me"	Stone	2:24
11.	"Here for the Night" (bonus track)	Stone	4:32

== Charts ==
=== Weekly charts ===
Chart (2010)	Peak position
Australian Albums (ARIA)	11
Belgian Albums (Ultratop Flanders)	59
Belgian Albums (Ultratop Wallonia)	53
French Albums (SNEP)	146
Dutch Albums (Album Top 100)	59

=== Year-end charts ===
Chart (2012)	Position
Australian Artist Albums (ARIA)	47

== Release history ==
Country	Date	Format	Label	Catalogue
Australia & Europe	25 May 2012	CD, Digital download	Picture Show Records/EMI Music	6242442
USA & Canada	25 May 2012	CD, Digital download	Nettwerk	0670030955-2
Europe	2012	LP (Limited Edition)	Picture Show Records	12PSR01
