= A Book Like This =

Studio album by Angus & Julia Stone
- Released: 8 September 2007
- Genre: Indie folk
- Labels: Flock, PIAS
- Producers: Fran Healy, Ian Pritchett, Angus and Julia Stone,

Angus & Julia Stone chronology
Heart Full of Wine The Beast (2007)	A Book Like This (2007)	Down the Way (2010)

Singles from A Book Like This
- 1. "The Beast" Released: August 18, 2007; 2. "Wasted" Released: March 16, 2008; 3. "Just a Boy" Released: March 29, 2008; 4. "Hollywood" Released: November 8, 2008

A Book Like This is the first studio album by Australian singer-songwriter duo Angus & Julia Stone. It was released in September 2007 in Australia and debuted and peaked on the ARIA Charts at number 6.

The album was released in the UK through Flock Music/PIAS on 31 March 2008 and an alternative version was released in North America through Nettwerk on 3 March 2009 where the band performed songs from the album on US Radio Station KCRW.

At the ARIA Music Awards of 2008, the album was nominated for Best Blues and Roots Album, Best Group, Breakthrough Artist and Best Cover Art.

== Reception ==
Professional ratings
Review scores
Source	Rating
AllMusic	3/5 stars

Andrew Leahey from AllMusic said "Angus & Julia Stone's debut recalls the lush, cuddle-up-in-bed indie folk of the Weepies and Kaiser Cartel. A Book Like This takes strength from its two young songwriters, both of whom approach love and coming-of-age issues from their own gendered perspective. Julia plays the part of the quirky ingénue, her vocals fluttering like a young Joanna Newsom over homespun melodies and gauzy instrumental backdrops... where brother Angus details an awkward encounter with the fairer sex". Leahey concluded "A Book Like This is an appropriate soundtrack for lazy Sunday afternoons and slow Monday mornings, when the pace of the world matches the relaxed gait of this band."

== Track listing ==
No.	Title	Length
1.	"The Beast"	3:50
2.	"Here We Go Again"	4:59
3.	"Wasted"	3:44
4.	"Just a Boy"	3:57
5.	"Bella"	4:05
6.	"Hollywood"	2:37
7.	"A Book Like This"	3:51
8.	"Silver Coin"	4:56
9.	"Stranger"	4:10
10.	"Soldier"	3:39
11.	"Jewels and Gold"	4:22
12.	"Another Day"	4:17
13.	"Horse and Cart"	4:36
14.	"Mother Hubbards Shoe" (Australian iTunes exclusive bonus track this was written by marcus dzanda)

=== Alternative version (2009) ===
No.	Title	Length
1.	"Mango Tree"	3:45
2.	"Wasted"	3:45
3.	"Private Lawns"	3:07
4.	"The Beast"	3:52
5.	"Silver Coin"	4:57
6.	"A Book Like This"	3:57
7.	"Choking"	5:48
8.	"Bella"	4:08
9.	"Paper Aeroplane"	3:43
10.	"Hollywood"	2:38
11.	"Just a Boy"	4:01
12.	"Jewels and Gold"	4:25
13.	"Here We Go Again"	5:01

== Personnel ==
- Zach Brock – strings, violin
- Ian Burdge – cello
- Mitchell Connelly – drums, percussion
- Calina de la Mare – violin
- Emery Dobyns – harmony
- Ali Friend – bass
- Fran Healy – bass, congas, Glockenspiel, Piano
- Sally Herbert – string arrangements, strings, violin
- Christopher Hoffman – cello, strings
- John Metcalfe – viola
- Elizabeth Myers – strings, viola
- Ian Pritchett – bass
- Jeff Ratner – bass, double bass
- Angus Stone – guitar, electric guitar, harmonica, Vocals
- Julia Stone – Bazouki, guitar, organ, piano, trumpet, vocals
- Cameron Whipp – violin
- Sarah Jane Wilson – cello
- Producers – Angus & Julia Stone, Fran Healy, Ian Pritchett
- Mixer – Ian Pritchett
- Illustrator – Caroline Pedler

== Charts ==
=== Weekly charts ===
Chart (2007–2010)	Peak position
Australian Albums (ARIA)	6
US Heatseekers Albums (Billboard)	32

=== Year-end charts ===
Chart (2007)	Position
Australian Artist Albums Chart	47
Chart (2008)	Position
Australian Albums Chart	60
Australian Artist Albums Chart	14
Chart (2010)	Position
Australian Artist Albums Chart	47

== Certifications ==
Region	Certification	Certified units/sales
Australia (ARIA)	2× Platinum	140,000^{‡}
^{‡} Sales+streaming figures based on certification alone.

== Release history ==
Country	Date	Format	Label	Catalogue
Australia	8 September 2007	CD	Capitol/EMI	5056592
Europe	8 September 2007	CD	Discograph	3233062
United Kingdom	31 March 2008	CD/DVD, digital download	Flock/PIAS	FLOCKCD1ST
US & Canada	2009	CD/DVD, digital download	Nettwerk	067003082525
