= Heart Full of Wine =

EP by Angus and Julia Stone
- Released: 3 February 2007
- Genre: Folk, acoustic
- Label: Capitol

Angus and Julia Stone chronology
Chocolates and Cigarettes (2006)	Heart Full of Wine (2007)	A Book Like This (2007)

Heart Full of Wine is the second EP by Australian singer-songwriter duo Angus and Julia Stone.

A video clip was produced for the title track.

== Track listing ==
All tracks are written by Angus & Julia Stone

No.	Title	Length
1.	"What You Wanted"	4:50
2.	"Fooled Myself"	5:20
3.	"Heart Full of Wine"	4:28
4.	"I'm Yours"	2:51
5.	"Sadder Than You"	2:50
6.	"Wooden Chair"	4:35
