= Down the Way =

Studio album by Angus & Julia Stone
- Released: 12 March 2010
- Genre: Folk, acoustic
- Length: 66:11 (including physical bonus track)
- Label: EMI Music Australia, Capitol Records
- Producer: Angus & Julia Stone (except "And the Boys" produced by Brad Albetta; "Hold On" co-produced by Keiran Kelly and "Big Jet Plane" co-produced by Govinda Doyle)

Angus & Julia Stone chronology
A Book Like This (2007)	Down the Way (2010)	Memories of an Old Friend (2010)

Singles from Down the Way
- 1. "And the Boys" Released: 4 December 2009; 2. "Black Crow" Released: March 2010; 3. "Big Jet Plane" Released: 7 May 2010; 4. "For You" Released: 1 April 2011

Down the Way is the second studio album by Australian singer-songwriter duo Angus & Julia Stone. It was released on 12 March 2010 in Australia through EMI Music Australia and debuted at number 1 on the ARIA Charts.

The physical CD release (including an untitled bonus track appended to track 13) was released in two formats: standard CD jewel case or deluxe version with gold embossed text on a ribbon-tied, peach-coloured, fabric covered digipak hard-book which includes the additional Red Berries bonus disc and a 20-page lyric book. Red Berries is a collection of bonus tracks from the previous EPs and includes one previously unreleased track "This Way". The song "Santa Monica Dream" was also featured in the 2015 video game Life Is Strange.

At the ARIA Music Awards of 2010, the album won Album of the Year, Best Adult Alternative Album, Best Cover Art while Angus and Julia won Producer of the Year for their work on this album.

At the J Awards of 2010, the album was nominated for Australian Album of the Year.

== Track listing ==
All tracks are written by Angus & Julia Stone

Down the Way
No.	Title	Length
1.	"Hold On"	4:25
2.	"Black Crow"	3:50
3.	"For You"	5:20
4.	"Big Jet Plane"	3:59
5.	"Santa Monica Dream"	5:30
6.	"Yellow Brick Road"	7:36
7.	"And the Boys"	4:09
8.	"On the Road"	4:05
9.	"Walk It Off"	3:24
10.	"Hush"	4:22
11.	"Draw Your Swords"	6:35
12.	"I'm Not Yours"	3:58
13.	"The Devil's Tears" (includes hidden song, "Old Friend")	8:51
Total length:		66:01

Australian deluxe packaging Red Berries bonus CD
No.	Title	Original release	Length
1.	"Lonely Hands" (Julia's version of "Just a Boy")	Hollywood (2008)	3:46
2.	"Red Berries"	"Just a Boy" (2008)	5:06
3.	"All the Colours" (Angus' version of "Wasted")	Hollywood (2008)	4:31
4.	"Choking"	The Beast (2008)	5:45
5.	"Take You Away"	"And the Boys" (2009)	3:50
6.	"Johnny and June" (Angus' version of "Hollywood")	Hollywood (2008)	3:12
7.	"This Way"	unreleased	2:39
8.	"Little Bird"	"The Beast" (2007)	4:28
9.	"I'll Wait"	"The Beast" (2007)	3:01
10.	"Change"	"And the Boys" (2009)	3:24
Total length:			39:47

== Charts ==
=== Weekly charts ===
Chart (2010)	Peak position
Australian Albums (ARIA)	1
Austrian Albums (Ö3 Austria)	34
Belgian Albums (Ultratop Wallonia)	48
Dutch Albums (Album Top 100)	66
French Albums (SNEP)	26
Swiss Albums (Schweizer Hitparade)	91

=== Year-end charts ===
Chart (2010)	Position
Australian Albums Chart	7
Australian Artist Albums Chart	1
Chart (2011)	Position
Australian Albums Chart	28
Australian Artist Albums Chart	7

=== Decade-end charts ===
Chart (2010–2019)	Position
Australian Albums (ARIA)	30
Australian Artist Albums (ARIA)	4

== Certifications ==
Region	Certification	Certified units/sales
Australia (ARIA)	4× Platinum	280,000^{‡}
New Zealand (RMNZ)	Platinum	15,000^{‡}
^{‡} Sales+streaming figures based on certification alone.

== Release history ==
Country	Date	Format	Label	Catalogue
Australia	12 March 2010	CD, Music download	Capitol Records/EMI Music	6263842
Australia	12 March 2010	2x Vinyl Record	EMI Music	5099960986511
Europe	15 March 2010	CD, DD, LP	Flock/PIAS	FLOCKCD8
USA & Canada	30 March 2010	CD/DVD, Digital download	Nettwerk	067003088428
