= Jessie Hill (director) =

Australian music video director and fashion designer

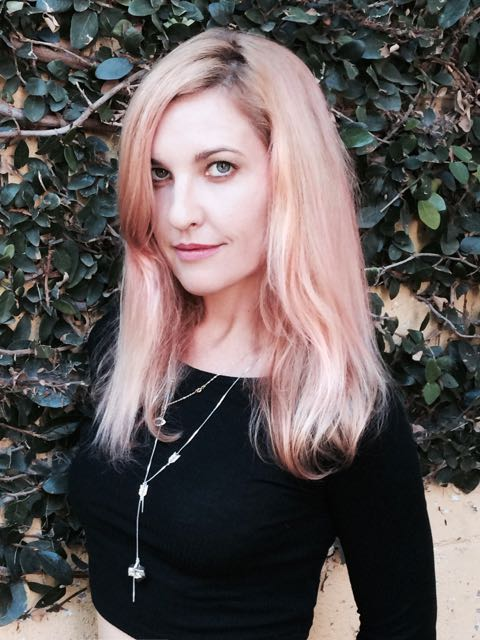
- Jessie Hill (Director) 2015
- Born: Avalon Beach, New South Wales, Australia
- Occupations: Director, Filmmaker, Fashion Designer
- Website: www.jessiehilldirector.com

Jessie Hill is an Australian music video director and fashion designer, best known for her work with Julia Stone and Angus Stone.

== Career ==
Hill began her career as a wardrobe assistant for film and TV in her home country of Australia. At the age of 16 she moved to Los Angeles and, shortly thereafter, she was hired as an assistant stylist for MTV. She moved through the ranks at MTV and began a career as an independent stylist, working with clients worldwide. In 2005, Hill became the head women's wear designer for cult label Buddhist Punk, and in 2007 launched an eponymous clothing line, which was presented in runway shows worldwide. Her collections were often inspired by the styles of the 1940s and 1960s. Hill was asked to direct her first music video in 2011 by Julia Stone, based on drawings Stone noticed in Hill's sketchbook. They have collaborated on the videos for the tracks By The Horns, Justine (starring Quinton Aaron) and Let’s Forget All The Things That We Say (starring Shiloh Fernandez). Following these videos, Jessie directed acclaimed music videos, short films and content for Rick Rubin, Chris Cornell, Halsey, Broods, Dean Lewis, Hey Violet, Disney, L'Oréal and NYX Cosmetics, as well as a fashion documentary film for Rag & Bone, with a music score by Thom Yorke. At the ARIA Music Awards of 2018 she won ARIA Award for Best Video for her direction on Dean Lewis' music video, "Be Alright" (June 2018).

== Personal life ==
Hill was born and raised in Avalon Beach, Sydney, Australia. Activist/actress Mia Farrow is her distant cousin.

Hill is based in Los Angeles, California.

== Music videos ==
=== 2012 ===
- Bird on a Buffalo - Angus Stone (starring Isabel Lucas)
- By The Horns - Julia Stone
- Justine - Julia Stone (starring Quinton Aaron)
- Let’s Forget - Julia Stone (starring Shiloh Fernandez)

=== 2014 ===
- A Heartbreak - Angus & Julia Stone
- Get Home - Angus & Julia Stone
- Heart Beats Slow - Angus & Julia Stone
- Let’s Forget (French Version) - Julia Stone (feat Benjamin Biolay)

=== 2015 ===
- High - Zella Day
- Nearly Forgot My Broken Heart - Chris Cornell starring Eric Roberts)
- Wanted Man - The Last Internationale

=== 2016 ===
- Free - Broods
- 1000x - Jarryd James
- Smoke and Fire - Sabrina Carpenter

=== 2017 ===
- Hoodie - Hey Violet

=== 2018 ===
- Be Alright - Dean Lewis
- Chateau - Angus & Julia Stone (starring Dacre Montgomery and Courtney Eaton)
- Nothing Else - Angus & Julia Stone
- Strangers - Halsey

== Short films ==
- Return To Sender – Directed by Jessie Hill. Written by Jessie Hill & Mishel Prada 2013
- Mari Celeste – Written and Directed by Jessie Hill 2014
- Secret Forest, Vogue (Magazine) Film | 2015
- Rag And Bone feat. Thom Yorke 2016
- Making of Documentary – Angus & Julia Stone, Rick Rubin, USA 2016

== Awards and nominations ==
=== ARIA Music Awards ===
The ARIA Music Awards is an annual awards ceremony that recognises excellence, innovation, and achievement across all genres of Australian music. They commenced in 1987.

Year	Nominee / work	Award	Result	Ref.
2018	Jessie Hill for "Be Alright" (Dean Lewis)	Best Video	Won	
2020	Jessie Hill for "Dance" (Julia Stone)	Best Video	Nominated	
