= Chocolates and Cigarettes =

Chocolates & Cigarettes

EP by Angus & Julia Stone
- Released: 26 August 2006
- Genre: Folk, acoustic
- Label: Capitol

Angus & Julia Stone chronology
Chocolates & Cigarettes (2006)	Heart Full of Wine (2007)

Singles from Chocolates and Cigarettes
- 1. "Paper Aeroplane" Released: 2006; 2. "Mango Tree" Released: 2006; 3. "Private Lawns" Released: 2007

Chocolates and Cigarettes is the first EP by Australian singer-songwriter duo Angus and Julia Stone.

"Mango Tree" and "Babylon" were used in the American television dramas Life and Army Wives, respectively. Giorgio Armani also sampled "Paper Aeroplane" for his 2008–09 winter collection runway. "Eye of the Storm", the third single from Bliss n Eso's album Flying Colours, uses the main riff and idea from the song "Paper Aeroplane".

== Track listing ==
All tracks are written by Angus & Julia Stone.

No.	Title	Length
1.	"Private Lawns"	3:07
2.	"Mango Tree"	3:43
3.	"All of Me"	5:23
4.	"Paper Aeroplane"	3:45
5.	"Babylon"	5:05
6.	"Chocolates & Cigarettes"	4:00
