= Big Jet Plane =

2009 single by Angus Stone

Song by Lady of the Sunshine

from the album Smoking Gun
- Released: 27 March 2009
- Genre: Folk, acoustic
- Length: 3:57
- Label: EMI, Desert Harvest
- Songwriter: Angus Stone
- Producer: Govinda Doyle

"Big Jet Plane" is a song written by Australian singer and songwriter Angus Stone, originally recorded under the stage name "Lady of the Sunshine" for his 2009 album Smoking Gun. It was then re-recorded the following year by Stone and his sister Julia as a duo. On 26 January 2011, Australian radio station Triple J announced that the Angus & Julia Stone version of "Big Jet Plane" was the winner of its 2010 Hottest 100 countdown.

== Angus & Julia Stone version ==
"Big Jet Plane"

Single by Angus & Julia Stone

from the album Down the Way
- Released: 7 May 2010
- Genre: Folk, acoustic
- Length: 3:59
- Label: EMI, Independiente
- Songwriters: Angus & Julia Stone
- Producers: Angus & Julia Stone; Govinda Doyle

Angus & Julia Stone singles chronology
"Black Crow" (2010)	"Big Jet Plane" (2010)	"For You" (2011)

"Big Jet Plane" was re-recorded by Angus & Julia Stone and released in May 2010 as the third single from the duo's second studio album Down the Way. The song peaked at number 21 in Australia and has been certified platinum. Additionally, the song has peaked inside the 40 in New Zealand, France and Belgium.

At the ARIA Music Awards of 2010, "Big Jet Plane" won the ARIA Award for Single of the Year. On 26 January 2011, the song was voted number 1 on the Triple J Hottest 100, 2010. On 14 March 2020, the song was voted number 9 on the Triple J Hottest 100 of the 2010s. In 2025, the song placed 20 in the Triple J Hottest 100 of Australian Songs.

It gained additional success, especially in Europe, when it was remixed in 2011 as a house track by Australian DJs Goodwill and Hook N Sling, under the title "Take You Higher".

"You're the One That I Want", a cover of the 1978 single by John Travolta and Olivia Newton-John from Grease: The Original Soundtrack from the Motion Picture, peaked at No. 21 on UK Independent Singles Chart in 2012.

The remixed She Said ( Big Jet Plane) by Trinix and Queen D got more than 100 millions streams on Spotify in 2024.

=== Track listing ===
1. "Big Jet Plane" – 3:42
2. "Living on a Rainbow" – 4:48
3. "My Malakai" – 3:05
4. "You're the One That I Want" – 3:14

== Chart performance ==
The week following the ARIA Music Awards of 2010, the song made a massive leap from #47 to #21 on the ARIA Chart, giving the song its peak position in its 22nd week of release. In total the song has spent 33 weeks in Australia's ARIA Charts.

== Charts ==
=== Weekly charts ===
Chart (2010–12)	Peak position
Australia (ARIA)	21
Belgium (Ultratip Bubbling Under Wallonia)	36
France (SNEP)	23
New Zealand (Recorded Music NZ)	20

=== Year-end charts ===
Chart (2010)	Position
Australia (ARIA)	69

Chart (2011)	Position
Australian Artist (ARIA)	7

Chart (2011)	Position
Australian Artist (ARIA)	13

Chart (2021)	Position
Australian Artist (ARIA)	36

== Certifications ==
Region	Certification	Certified units/sales
Australia (ARIA)	11× Platinum	770,000^{‡}
Canada (Music Canada)	2× Platinum	160,000^{‡}
New Zealand (RMNZ)	3× Platinum	90,000^{‡}
United Kingdom (BPI)	Silver	200,000^{‡}
United States (RIAA)	Platinum	1,000,000^{‡}
^{‡} Sales+streaming figures based on certification alone.

== Cover versions ==
Papa vs Pretty covered the song at the 2011 Apra Music Awards. Goodwill and Hook N Sling remixed the song and renamed it "Take You Higher". Also in 2011, Jan Blomqvist covered and recreated an electronic version of the song.

In November 2015, Australian rapper Tuka and Thelma Plum covered the song for Triple J Like a Version, modifying the song with substantial additional verse lyrics. Tuka's cover was voted at 81 in the Triple J Hottest 100, 2015.

=== Alok and Mathieu Koss version ===
"Big Jet Plane"

Single by Alok and Mathieu Koss
- Released: 29 September 2017
- Recorded: 2017
- Genre: EDM; house
- Length: 3:04
- Label: Spinnin Records
- Songwriters: Angus & Julia Stone

Alok singles chronology
"Alien Technology" (2017)	"Big Jet Plane" (2017)	"Paga de Solteiro Feliz" (2018)

Mathieu Koss singles chronology
"Campfire" (2016)	"Big Jet Plane" (2017)	"Best Is Yet To Come" (2018)

Music video
- "Big Jet Plane" on YouTube

In September 2017, Brazilian DJ and producer Alok and French DJ/producer Mathieu Koss made a cover of the song. This new EDM version reached first place in the top 100 on iTunes and Shazam in Brazil. It placed in many national airplay charts: in France, Italy, Spain, Belgium, Russia, and many more. This version has more than 200 million streams on Spotify, Apple Music, and YouTube. In 2018, Big Jet Plane was nominated for Best Video Clip of the Year at the MTV Millennial Awards.

==== Charts ====
Chart (2018)	Peak position
Billboard Brasil Hot 100 (BRA)	76
Ultratop (BEL)	19

== Appearances in media ==
The song was used in TV series including 90210, One Tree Hill, Parenthood, and Suits. It also appears on the soundtrack of French film Romantics Anonymous. A music video featuring scenes from the film was released on 9 November 2010. "Big Jet Plane" was also used in the films Easy A and The Edge of Seventeen.

The duo performed the song on French television show Taratata on 19 May 2010.

The song is heard in a Maybelline Fit Me commercial.

== See also ==
- List of highest-certified singles in Australia
