= Angus & Julia Stone =

Australian folk and indie pop group

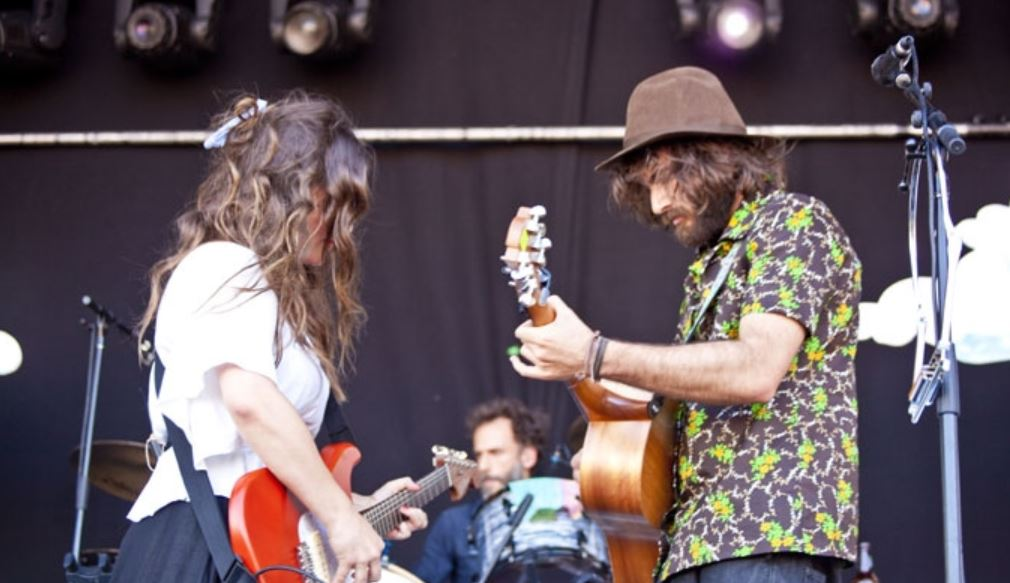
- Julia and Angus performing in 2011

Background information
- Origin: Sydney, Australia
- Genres: Folk rock, indie pop, Americana
- Years active: 2006–present
- Labels: American Recordings, EMI Music Australia, Virgin EMI, Universal Germany, Discograph France
- Spinoffs: Dope Lemon
- Members: Angus Stone; Julia Stone; with: Ben Edgar; Lozz Benson
- Past members: Mitchell "Mitch" Connelly; Clay MacDonald; Rob Calder; Matt Johnson
- Website: www.angusandjuliastone.com

Angus & Julia Stone are an Australian folk and indie pop duo, formed in 2006 by siblings Angus and Julia Stone. To date, they have released six studio albums: A Book Like This (2007), Down the Way (2010), Angus & Julia Stone (2014), Snow (2017), Cape Forestier (2024), and Karaoke Bar (2026). The duo also provided the soundtrack to the 2021 video game Life is Strange: True Colors, releasing it as the soundtrack album Life is Strange in 2021. At the ARIA Music Awards of 2010, they won five awards from nine nominations: Album of the Year, Best Adult Alternative Album, Best Cover Art and Producer of the Year for Down the Way, and Single of the Year for "Big Jet Plane".

== History ==
=== Early years and musical style ===
Angus (b. 1986) and Julia (b. 1984) Stone were born in Sydney to Kim and John Stone, both of whom influenced their children's interest in music. Along with their older sister, Catherine, Julia and Angus grew up in the suburb of Newport on Sydney's Northern Beaches. They attended Newport Primary School and then Barrenjoey High School. During their teen years, Angus started writing pop songs. After finishing school, Angus worked as a labourer and learned guitar while recuperating from a snowboarding accident. During this time Julia taught trumpet.

==== Gap year ====
After travelling abroad, when she returned to Australia, Julia encouraged Angus to start performing. By 2005, Angus was playing at open mics with Julia occasionally performing backing vocals. For their first such gig, at the Coogee Bay Hotel, they performed Angus' song "Tears". By that time, Julia was writing her own material and they played split sets, with each providing backing vocals for the other's material.

==== Collaboration ====
The siblings decided to collaborate on their musical endeavours as a duo in early 2006. They each write on their own material, then work together on structure and harmonies. Australian music journalist Ed Nimmervoll described their songwriting as: "Julia with her highly romantic confessional relationship songs, Angus with his more guarded lyrically, more directly pop-oriented songs".

They have distinctive vocal styles, according to The Sydney Morning Herald's Bernard Zuel: "[h]er voice has a fractured feel like Jolie Holland; his has a smoke-on-the-beach drawl". Nimmervoll offered, "Angus has a Paul Simon style voice, in the high register, equally as suited to lead and harmony. Julia's is one of those girly, fragile theatrical voices very much in vogue in alt-folk these days. She'd struggle to distinguish herself against the competition, but alternating with Angus gives her the necessary platform of variety, and just as well, because the songs she takes charge of are such wonderful tales of forlorn reflection".

United Kingdom journalist Johnny Sharp of Mojo stated, "[m]ost impressive, though, are the songs – simple but blindingly effective acoustic compositions, warm boy-girl harmonies and delicate, less-is-more arrangements. Resistance is surely futile". Lewis Bazley of inthenews.co.uk felt they had a "winning mix of Angus' Damien Rice-like lilting vocals and Julia's Björk-esque warbling creating a sonic combination that lulls the listener into wistful contentment".

=== 2006: Chocolates and Cigarettes and Heart Full of Wine EPs ===
In March 2006 Angus & Julia Stone began recording their debut extended play, Chocolates and Cigarettes, with Julia on vocals, guitar and trumpet; Angus on vocals and guitar; Mitchell "Mitch" Connelly (the Beautiful Girls) on drums and percussion; Clay MacDonald (the Beautiful Girls) on bass guitar; and Hanna Oblikov guesting on cello. The EP's title was provided by Julia: "I really like both ... But I'm trying to not like cigarettes. I only smoke now after I play gigs". Connelly, who was Julia's then-boyfriend, and MacDonald had permanently left their band, the Beautiful Girls, to back the duo for live performances. Their first single, "Paper Aeroplane", from the EP was played on Australian radio in April including on FBi. That same month Angus & Julia Stone played at The Great Escape Festival. At the end of July, the siblings played to two hundred people packed in a tiny tent at the Splendour in the Grass festival in Byron Bay.

By August they had signed a two-EP distribution deal with EMI Music in Australia and independent label Independiente Records in the United Kingdom and relocated to London. On 26 August that year the six-track EP was officially released by EMI Music with Ian Prichett (the Beautiful Girls) producing. While in the UK, they were invited into Chris Potter's studio (The Verve, Richard Ashcroft) to record. Fran Healy from UK band Travis had also heard their debut EP and invited them to his house to record. The result of these two matchups was the duo's second EP, Heart Full of Wine, which also had six tracks, appeared on 3 February 2007. Again Connelly provided drums and percussion, but on bass guitar was James Perryman and on cello was Bethany Porter; both Angus and Julia also played harmonica. At the end of 2006, the duo signed a worldwide publishing deal with Sony/ATV Music Publishing, and Creative Artists Agency came on board as their UK-European agent.

=== 2007–2009: A Book Like This ===
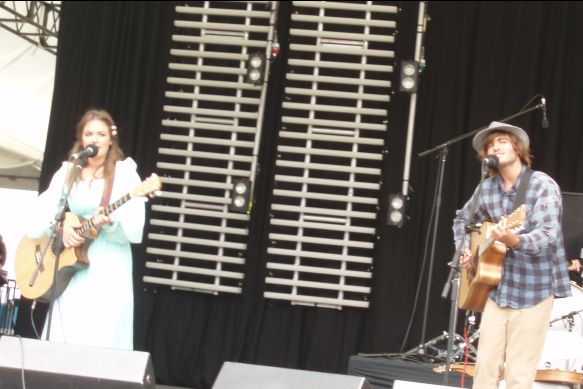
Performing at Falls Festival, Marion Bay, Tasmania, December 2007

During their time in London, Healy helped Angus & Julia Stone with material which later become a part of their debut album, A Book Like This. With a producer to guide them, the siblings sat on Healy's lounge-room floor, continuing to record songs, using vintage guitars and microphones. The rest of the tracks were recorded in their mother's lounge room back in Newport with Pritchett. 2007 commenced with the duo playing at January's Big Day Out.

Their single "Paper Aeroplane" was listed at No. 43 on the Triple J Hottest 100, 2006. In February 2007 they played their first national Australian tour, which sold out. In the same month, Chocolates and Cigarettes and Heart Full of Wine were double-packed and released in Australia and the UK. The double EP reached No. 12 on the UK iTunes, and their single "Private Lawns" was named Single of the Week on BBC Radio 2. It received a positive review from The Evening Standard, which called it "[t]heir finest track[;] its cheeky toe-taping rhythm [is] impossible to resist".

In late March that year, the group signed with the William Morris Agency as their US agent. In May they played at The Great Escape Festival in Brighton. The Evening Standard reported, "Potentially chart-bound tracks were in far greater supply when Angus and Julia Stone took to the stage". In August they released "The Beast", which reached the top 40 of the ARIA Singles Chart. On 8 September the group followed with their debut studio album, A Book Like This, which peaked at No. 6 on the ARIA Albums Chart. By 2008 it was certified platinum by ARIA for shipment of 70,000 units. The group spent the rest of 2007 dividing their time between Australia and the UK. They toured around Australia and gigged extensively in the UK, Ireland and Scotland including support slots with The Magic Numbers and a winning display at the Latitude Festival.

They welcomed in 2008 by performing at the New Year's Eve Falls Festival in Australia before heading back to the UK to support Newton Faulkner and David Gray, as well as playing their own sold-out London shows at Scala. Two of their tracks were listed on the Triple J Hottest 100, 2007, with "Wasted" at No. 31 and "The Beast" at No. 45. A Book Like This was released in the UK in March 2008. In May they performed at the Woodford Folk Festival. The UK press lauded the duo: Uncut magazine said they performed "[f]ragile, beautiful songs"; a reviewer for The Guardian said "[they] fill [my] heart to bursting point with joy". The second half of that year was filled with more touring, including a support spot with Martha Wainwright across the UK and into continental Europe playing gigs to over 25,000 people. In October they issued another four-track EP, Hollywood, which included re-recorded versions from A Book Like This with lead vocals swapped from Julia to Angus for "All the Colours" (a.k.a. "Wasted") and "Johnny and June" ("Hollywood"), and from Angus to Julia for "Lonely Hands" ("Just a Boy"). A three-track version was released for the US market.

In March 2009, A Book Like This was released in the United States. The siblings supported Brett Dennen around the US, then they performed on the KCRW stage at South by Southwest as well as their own US shows. By April, however, they decided to take a break from performing and recording together. Angus released his debut solo album, Smoking Gun, under the pseudonym Lady of the Sunshine. His album reached the top 50 on the ARIA Albums Chart. One of his tracks, "Big Jet Plane", from Smoking Gun was later re-recorded by Angus & Julia Stone and released by the duo as a single in May 2010.

=== 2009–2010: Down the Way and "Big Jet Plane" ===
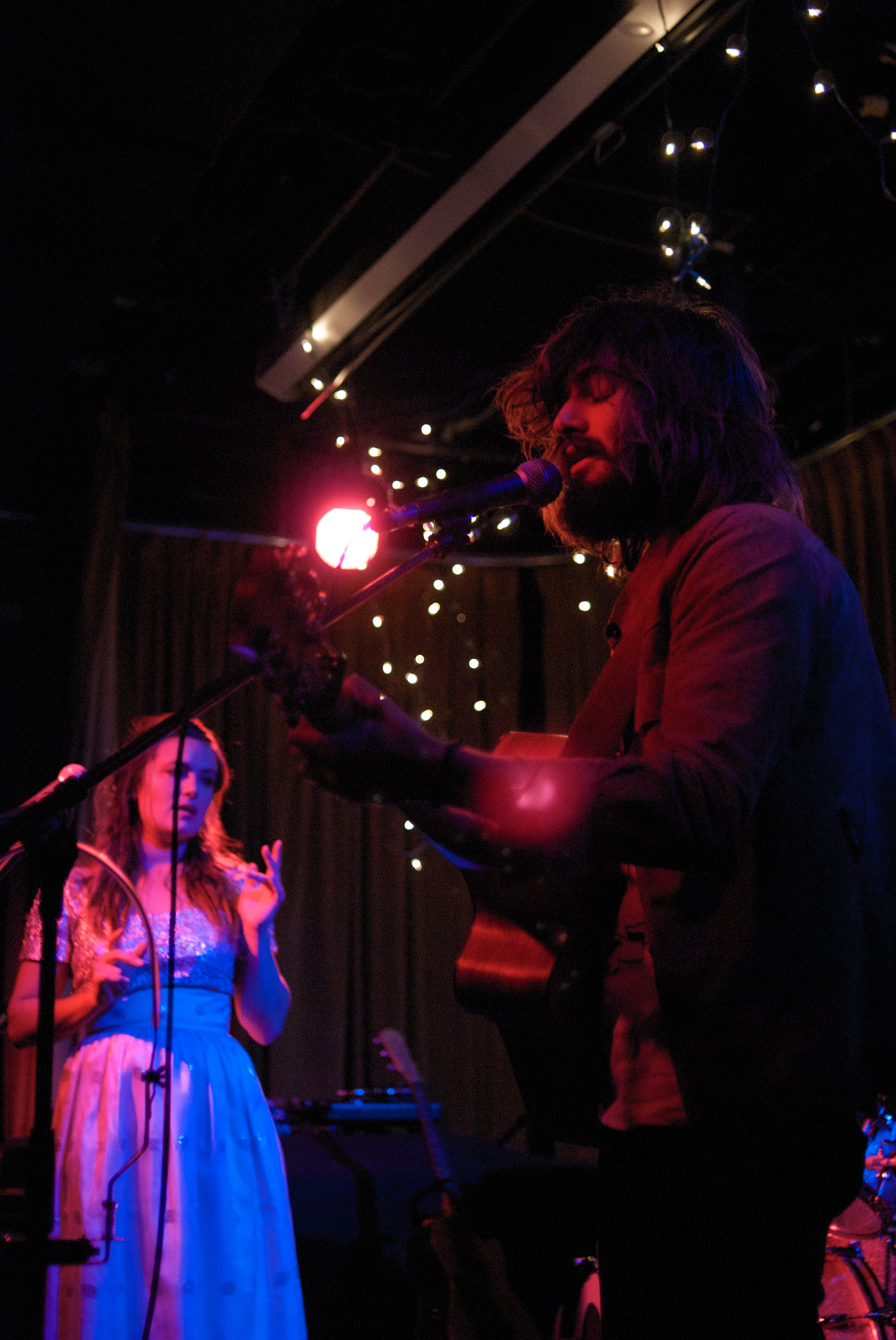
Angus & Julia Stone performing in 2009

Angus & Julia Stone spent most of 2009 writing, recording and self-producing their second studio album, Down the Way. The album was mixed by Kieran Kelly (Midnight Youth) at The Buddy Project in Astoria, New York. On 18 November 2009, the brother and sister appeared on Triple J's Dools show with Scott Dooley and premiered their single "And the Boys". They announced their second album, Down the Way, was due in March 2010 and coincided with an Australian tour. After six months apart (Angus back in Australia, Julia in New York), they recorded the album in studios in Sawmills Cornwall England, Brooklyn in New York and with Govinda Doyle in Coolangatta, Queensland. Angus described the album: "All the songs were written so far [apart] that the styles and moods are really different". It debuted at No. 1 on the ARIA Albums Chart. The lead single, "And the Boys", became the group's second entry into the ARIA Singles Chart top 50.

During April 2010, the duo toured the UK to sold-out venues. Katy Ratican of Contactmusic.com caught their performance at the Ruby Lounge in Manchester: "a set led primarily by Julia, she had the greater presence of the duo throughout. With Angus appearing the [more] shy of the two, it was left to Julia to engage the audience with chat and it wasn't until later in the set that Angus' seemingly gentle nature was fully accepted". Alexander Gunz described their gig in Berlin: "[they] look exactly as they do in the press photos: a slightly pot-smoking Neo-Hippie couple. He with artfully excellent and fluffy hair under his hat, her with Edding-painted roses on her guitar and a long blue dress, which while dancing she lifts slightly with her fingertips". The following month, the Big Jet Plane EP was released, which included Julia singing a cover version of "You're the One That I Want" from Grease. In Australia, "Big Jet Plane", their highest-charting single, peaked at No. 21. It appeared at No. 20 on the New Zealand Singles Chart, No. 23 in Belgium and top 40 on the French Singles Chart.

In an April 2010 interview with the Australian edition of Rolling Stone magazine, Julia revealed she had recorded a solo album in New York in late 2009. Her song "This Love" appears in the Australian film The Waiting City. The album, The Memory Machine, was released in a low-key fashion in September 2010. She described it as "mellow" but darker and spookier in tone than the duo's work. Due to her commitments with the group there were no solo tours to promote her album. Down the Way also charted in Europe, where it peaked in the top 30 on the French Albums Chart and stayed in the top 200 for 86 weeks. It reached the top 50 in Austria and Belgium; and the top 100 in Switzerland and The Netherlands. At the ARIA Music Awards of 2010 Angus & Julia Stone won 'Album of the Year' and 'Best Adult Alternative Album' for Down the Way and 'Single of the Year' for "Big Jet Plane", as well as Artisan Awards for 'Producer of the Year' and 'Best Cover Art' for their work on Down the Way. Their song "Big Jet Plane" was announced No. 1 on the Triple J Hottest 100 on Australia Day (26 January) 2011.

=== 2011–2013: Solo albums ===
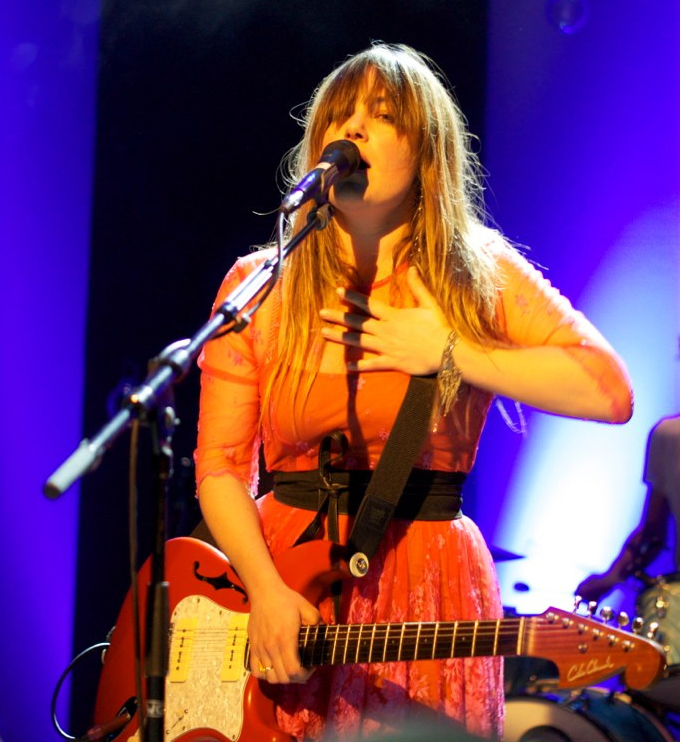
Julia performing at the Motel Mozaïque, Rotterdam, The Netherlands, April 2012

In an interview with Jason Treuen of Rolling Stone (Australia), Angus & Julia Stone confirmed they were writing material for a third album, with Angus stating, "I want to write stuff that makes me wanna move, more groove-based stuff." They performed at the 2011 Falls Festivals and Big Day Out festivals in Australia, followed by the Coachella festival in California. During July that year, the band toured Europe for a month, visiting Portugal, The Netherlands, Belgium, France, Switzerland and Italy.

The pair planned to travel and holiday overseas for the rest of the year, while also writing and recording. According to Triple J, in December 2010, they aimed to release their new music at the end of 2011. On 26 September 2011, the duo's song "Love Will Take You" was announced as the second track on the soundtrack for The Twilight Saga film Breaking Dawn – Part 1. On the same day, the band was selected as a top ten finalist in MTV Iggy's 2011 Best New Band in the World! competition. Their song "For You" was featured multiple times in the first two seasons of the American Broadcasting Company television show Revenge, and in the 2011 movie Death of a Superhero.

In May 2012, Julia told Rolling Stone (Australia) that the duo had shelved work on a third album, indefinitely: "It was too much to think we could only pick six songs each… We were both in a place where we really wanted creative space to go in whatever direction we wanted so we were like 'let's just take a year out'". She explained that those songs were unlikely to be heard, but maintained the group would reunite after their solo projects. That same month, Julia released her second solo album, By the Horns, which debuted at No. 11 on the ARIA Albums Chart.

"When we make a record there are always too many songs, so we try and cut back to six songs each. There's no real process of deciding what gets put on the album and what gets put on our solo records ... It's funny, Angus didn't hear my solo record until it was being printed and I hadn't heard any of the songs from his solo record – we did them totally separately"

— Julia Stone, March 2011

She described writing the songs and temporarily parting with Angus, "[w]e had already been working on a new record together but it didn't feel right ... I was thinking 'I'll make it now and we'll figure out what happens when it happens'". "Then Angus and I were talking on the phone and he'd been working on more stuff on his own as well and we both just agreed – we were both in the same place, ready to put together a collection of our own songs". From late 2011 Angus had worked on his second solo album, Broken Brights, which was released in July 2012, and reached No. 2. He told Garin Fahlman of Vancouver Weekly that he had "discovered a lot about time ... Just in general. To take a step back and let something unfold and breathe and become ripe when it says it's time". In November 2012, Megan Sauers of Venture Mag reported that Angus & Julia Stone were due to tour Europe during January and February 2013. In early December 2012, Julia and Angus each performed solo slots at Homebake. Julia indicated further solo shows from mid-February 2013.

=== 2014: Self-titled album ===
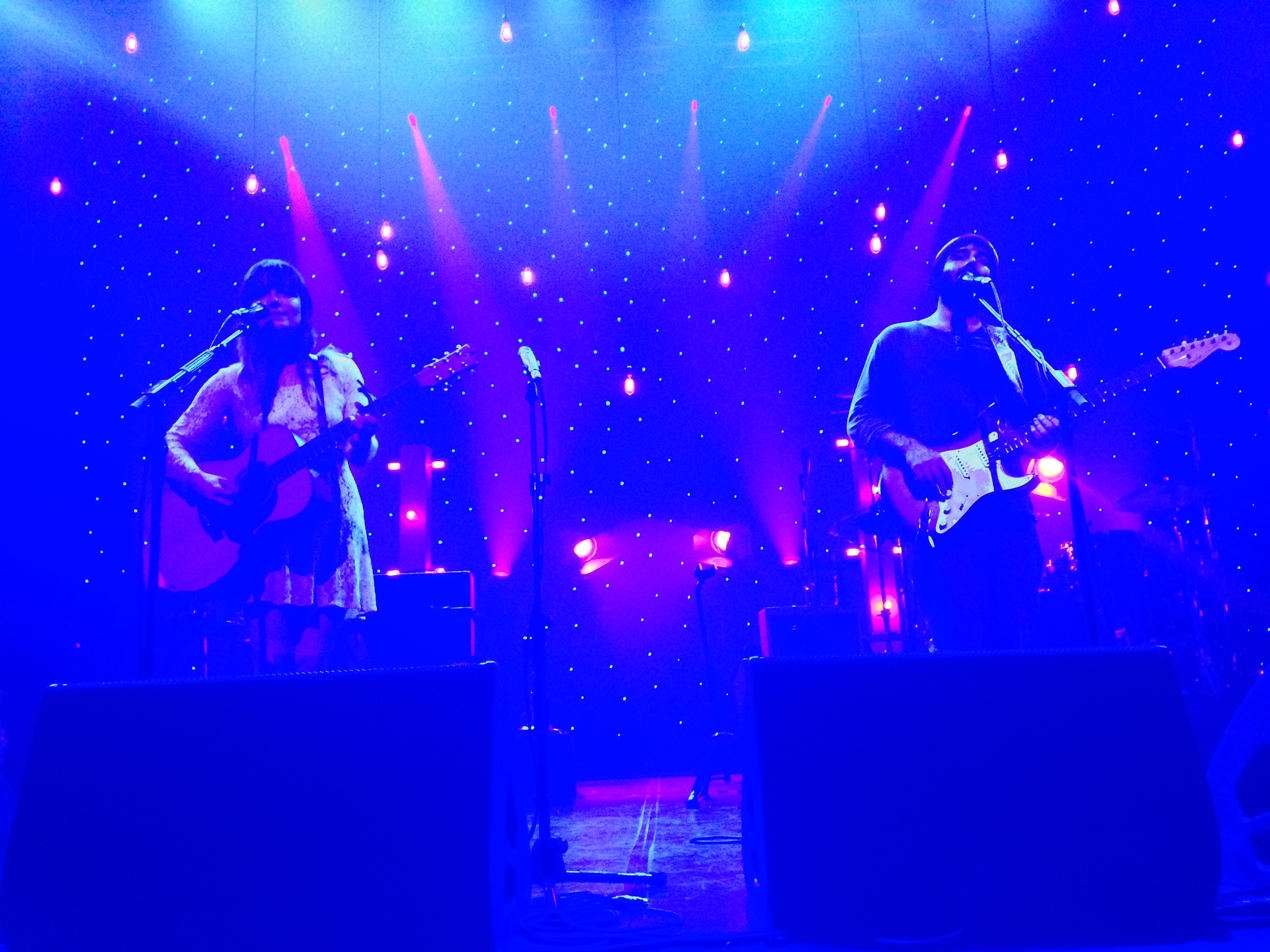
Angus & Julia Stone performing at Casino de Paris in 2014

The duo began working with Rick Rubin in Malibu during April 2014. On 17 April, Julia tweeted from her Twitter account, "Up at the studio in Malibu. Recording with me brethren and the man of wonder Rick for the new album." Rubin helped reunite the duo and co-produced the album. The producer said of the experience: "This album is extraordinary; Angus and Julia are truly unique musicians. They are authentic and pure people who do things from the heart. I've never worked with anyone like them before." The album has been said to contain "blended harmonies [...] and more experimental guitar textures".

Angus & Julia Stone was released on 1 August 2014 in Australia through EMI Music Australia, and on the same day in the United States through American Recordings. Its release was preceded by the singles "Heart Beats Slow", which peaked at No. 37 in Australia, and "A Heartbreak". The videos for both songs as well as a video for "Get Home" were directed by Jessie Hill.

The album is the highest-charting by the duo to date, reaching the top 10 in several countries including France, Germany, the Netherlands and New Zealand. With an average of 67 based on 7 reviews on review aggregator Metacritic, Angus & Julia Stone received generally favorable critical reception.

=== 2017: Snow ===
Ideas for the duo's fourth studio album came about while the duo were in Switzerland, and the album was recorded at Angus' Byron Bay studio over a period of approximately six months. Angus & Julia Stone's fourth studio album, Snow, was released on 15 September 2017. The album features the title track "Snow" and "Chateau". The album peaked at number 2 on the ARIA albums chart.

Angus and Julia included a song about their late grandfather on the album, titled "Cellar Door", as he had helped inspire them to become a band; the track is about Angus revisiting his hometown to sing at his funeral.

Two of the album's tracks were voted into the Triple J Hottest 100, 2017: "Chateau" at number three and "Snow" at number 98.

At the ARIA Music Awards of 2018, the album was nominated for two awards, Best Blues and Roots Album and Best Independent Release, while the single "Chateau" was nominated for Song of the Year.

=== 2021–2024: Life Is Strange and Cape Forestier ===
On 20 August 2021, Angus and Julia Stone released Life is Strange, their first release through a new recording deal with BMG. The album was pitched as "unexpected, unguarded, unforgettable" and led by the single "Love Song". The album was created as a soundtrack to the 2021 video game Life Is Strange: True Colors.

In early 2023, Post Malone was opening for the American band Red Hot Chili Peppers in Melbourne, when Angus Stone was invited on stage. Malone and Stone proceeded to perform "Big Jet Plane" together. This happened a dfew months after a video of Malone was released, talking to American rapper Swae Lee about how he could sample the song. A recording of the performance was uploaded onto Malone's YouTube page on 16 May 2023.

In April 2024, the siblings returned to Triple J's weekly segment Like a Version, where they covered Scottish singer-songwriter Lewis Capaldi's "Someone You Loved". They also performed a live version of their single "Cape Forestier".

In February 2024, the duo announced their fifth studio album, Cape Forestier, would be released in May 2024. The duo also released the single "The Wedding Song" on 9 February. On 8 March, they released the album's title track, "Cape Forestier". Cape Forestier was released on 10 May 2024.

=== 2026: Karaoke Bar ===
In May 2026, the duo announced their sixth studio album, Karaoke Bar. The album was created across multiple locations in Greece, France and Australia. The album's title track was also shared as its lead single on the same day. The album was released on 4 September 2026.

== Discography ==
- A Book Like This (2007)
- Down the Way (2010)
- Angus & Julia Stone (2014)
- Snow (2017)
- Cape Forestier (2024)
- Karaoke Bar (2026)

== Awards and nominations ==
=== AIR Awards ===
The Australian Independent Record Awards (commonly known informally as AIR Awards) is an annual awards night to recognise, promote and celebrate the success of Australia's Independent Music sector.

| Year | Nominee / work | Award | Result | Ref. |
|---|---|---|---|---|
| 2022 | Life Is Strange | Best Independent Blues and Roots Album or EP | Nominated | |

=== APRA Awards ===
The APRA Awards are presented annually from 1982 by the Australasian Performing Right Association (APRA), "honouring composers and songwriters".

| Year | Nominee / work | Award | Result |
|---|---|---|---|
| 2011 | Angus & Julia Stone (Angus Stone, Julia Stone) | Songwriter of the Year | Won |
| 2011 | "Big Jet Plane" (Angus Stone, Julia Stone) | Song of the Year | Won |
| 2015 | "Get Home" (Angus Stone, Julia Stone) | Blues & Roots Work of the Year | Nominated |
| 2015 | "Heart Beats Slow" (Angus Stone, Julia Stone) | Blues & Roots Work of the Year | Won |
| 2015 | "Heart Beats Slow" (Angus Stone, Julia Stone) | Song of the Year | Shortlisted |
| 2018 | "Snow" (Angus Stone, Julia Stone) | Song of the Year | Shortlisted |
| 2019 | "Chateau" (Angus Stone, Julia Stone) | Blues & Roots Work of the Year | Won |

=== ARIA Awards ===
The ARIA Music Awards are presented annually from 1987 by the Australian Recording Industry Association (ARIA).

| Year | Nominee / work | Award | Result |
|---|---|---|---|
| 2008 | "The Beast" | Breakthrough Artist – Single | Nominated |
| 2008 | A Book Like This | Best Blues & Roots Album | Nominated |
| 2008 | A Book Like This | Best Group | Nominated |
| 2008 | A Book Like This | Breakthrough Artist – Album | Nominated |
| 2008 | A Book Like this – IOSHVA | Best Cover Art | Nominated |
| 2008 | "Just a Boy" (Angus Stone, Julia Stone, Josh Groom) | Best Video | Nominated |
| 2010 | Down the Way | Best Group | Nominated |
| 2010 | Down the Way | Album of the Year | Won |
| 2010 | Down the Way | Best Adult Alternative Album | Won |
| 2010 | Down the Way (Angus Stone, Julia Stone) | Best Cover Art | Won |
| 2010 | Down the Way (Angus Stone, Julia Stone) | Producer of the Year | Won |
| 2010 | "Big Jet Plane" | Single of the Year | Won |
| 2010 | "Big Jet Plane" (Kiku Ohe) | Best Video | Nominated |
| 2010 | Down The Way | Most Popular Australian Album | Nominated |
| 2010 | Down The Way | Most Popular Australian Artist | Nominated |
| 2014 | Angus & Julia Stone | Best Cover Artist | Nominated |
| 2014 | Angus & Julia Stone | Best Rock Album | Nominated |
| 2018 | Snow | Best Blues & Roots Album | Nominated |
| 2018 | Snow | Best Independent Release | Nominated |
| 2018 | "Chateau" | Song of the Year | Nominated |
| 2021 | Life is Strange | Best Original Soundtrack, Cast or Show Album | Won |
| 2024 | Cape Forestier | Best Adult Contemporary Album | Nominated |
| 2024 | Eric J Debowsky for Cape Forestier | Best Engineered Release | Nominated |

=== Environmental Music Prize ===
The Environmental Music Prize is a quest to find a theme song to inspire action on climate and conservation. It commenced in 2022.

| Year | Nominee / work | Award | Result | Ref. |
|---|---|---|---|---|
| 2025 | "Down to the Sea" | Environmental Music Prize | Nominated | |

=== J Award ===
The J Awards are an annual series of Australian music awards that were established by the Australian Broadcasting Corporation's youth-focused radio station Triple J. They commenced in 2005.

| Year | Nominee / work | Award | Result |
|---|---|---|---|
| 2008 | "Just a Boy" | Australian Video of the Year | Nominated |
| 2010 | Down the Way | Australian Album of the Year | Nominated |

=== Helpmann Awards ===
The Helpmann Awards is an awards show celebrating live entertainment and performing arts in Australia, presented by industry group Live Performance Australia since 2001. (2020 and 2021 were cancelled due to the COVID-19 pandemic.)

| Year | Nominee / work | Award | Result | Ref. |
|---|---|---|---|---|
| 2011 | Down the Way Tour | Best Australian Contemporary Concert | Nominated | |

=== National Live Music Awards ===
The National Live Music Awards (NLMAs) are a broad recognition of Australia's diverse live industry, celebrating the success of the Australian live scene. The awards commenced in 2016.

| Year | Nominee / work | Award | Result |
|---|---|---|---|
| 2019 | Themselves | International Live Achievement (Group) | Nominated |
