= Julia Stone =

Australian singer-songwriter

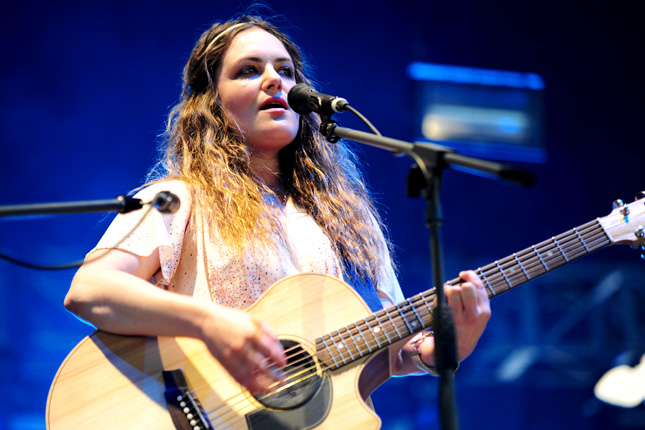
- Stone performing at the 2011 Southbound Festival in Busselton

Background information
- Born: Julia Natasha Stone; 13 April 1984 (age 42); Sydney, Australia
- Genres: Folk, acoustic
- Occupation: Singer-songwriter
- Instruments: Vocals, guitar, mandolin, piano
- Years active: 2005–present
- Labels: EMI, Flock/PIAS, Nettwerk, Discograph
- Member of: Angus & Julia Stone
- Website: juliastonemusic.com

Julia Natasha Stone (born 13 April 1984) is an Australian folk singer-songwriter. She is a sister of Angus Stone, with whom she has collaborated in professional music, and is also a solo musician. Her debut solo album, The Memory Machine, was released in September 2010. Her second solo album, By the Horns, was released in May 2012, and peaked at No. 11 on the ARIA Albums Chart.

== Early life ==
Julia Stone was born on 13 April 1984 and grew up in Sydney. Her parents, Kim and John Stone, were both folk musicians. Stone's older sister is Catherine (born ca. 1982) and her younger brother is Angus Stone (born 27 April 1986). Stone attended Newport Primary School and Barrenjoey High School. At primary school she joined the school band with her father teaching and her siblings accompanying. At family gatherings when the children performed, Stone played trumpet, Catherine saxophone and Angus trombone with Kim singing and John on keyboard or guitar.

== Career ==
=== 2005–present: Julia and Angus ===
After finishing secondary school and while on a holiday with her brother in South America, Stone was impressed by his musical talent. "[Angus] was writing amazing songs ... [he] had shown me how to play guitar in Bolivia, and those songs had gotten me through that year." Subsequently, Stone started writing her own songs. By 2005 Stone was playing at open mics; sometimes Angus performed backing vocals – at their first such gig, at the Coogee Bay Hotel, they performed "Tears". After playing split sets with each singing backing vocals to the other's material, in 2006, they started a duo, Angus & Julia Stone. In March that year the pair recorded their debut extended play, Chocolates and Cigarettes, which was released in August. Since then the group has released five EPs, a compilation album and four studio albums.

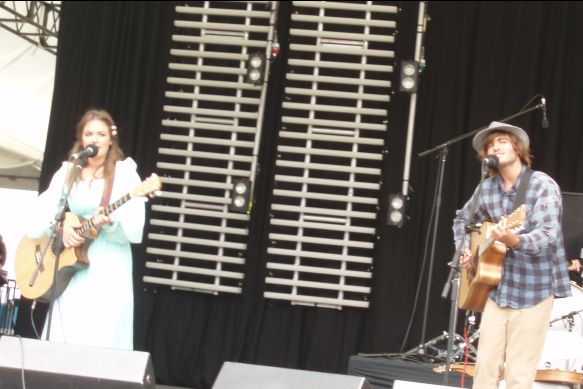
Angus & Julia Stone (Julia at left) performing at Falls Festival, Marion Bay, Tasmania, December 2007

Although Julia and her younger brother, Angus, have always clearly communicated to the public that they are siblings, fans have mistook the pair for a married couple due to their shared last name.

Angus & Julia Stone's second album, Down the Way (March 2010), debuted at number one on the ARIA Albums Chart and was certified 3× platinum in 2011. It was the highest-selling album by an Australian artist for 2010. At the ARIA Music Awards of 2010 the duo won ARIA Album of the Year for Down the Way and ARIA Single of the Year for "Big Jet Plane". The track "Big Jet Plane" was voted number one in the Triple J Hottest 100 in 2011 by the station's listeners.

=== 2010–present: Solo career ===
Despite reaching critical acclaim as a duo, Stone had initially embarked on her musical career to become a solo musician. In September 2010, after five years of recording and touring with the duo, Stone released her debut solo album, The Memory Machine, which charted on the ARIA Albums Chart into the top 100. It was well received by fans and critics. Poppy Reid of The Music Network found that "Julia uses clever vintage horror film posters painted by UK artist Caroline Pedler. The posters depict themes from each song; all of them of course, starring Julia as herself".

In June 2011, she sang backing vocals on "Do You Realize" for The Flaming Lips and Edward Sharpe and the Magnetic Zeros at a sunrise concert at the Hollywood Forever Cemetery. In August that year Stone supported her collaborator, Doveman, at shows in California and New York.

On 25 May 2012, Stone released her second solo album, By the Horns, simultaneously around the world, which debuted at No. 11 on the ARIA Albums Chart. Stone described writing the songs and temporarily parting with Angus: "[w]e had already been working on a new record together but it didn’t feel right ... I was thinking 'I'll make it now and we'll figure out what happens when it happens'". "Then Angus and I were talking on the phone and he'd been working on more stuff on his own as well and we both just agreed – we were both in the same place, ready to put together a collection of our own songs". She worked on the album in California, France, Australia and India.

Originally released in 2010, Julia's cover version of "You're the One That I Want" has been featured on UK and Irish TV channel Sky's identification ad. The track entered the UK iTunes charts after airing on the commercial.

In 2015, Stone was featured on Jarryd James' single "Regardless", which peaked at number 48 in Australia in August.

In February 2020, Stone released a cover version of "Beds Are Burning". The song is the lead single from the collaborative album Songs for Australia, released on 5 March 2020.

In July 2020, it was confirmed that Stone had signed with BMG Australia and on 31 October 2020, Stone announced that her third studio album, Sixty Summers, would be released on 30 April 2021. In November 2021, Stone announced the release of a Christmas album titled Everything Is Christmas. In an accompanying statement, Stone said "Christmas music has always been such a beautiful and nostalgic part of my life. This is a record I've always wanted to make. It has been in me for so long."

In March 2023, Stone featured on Peking Duk's Like a Version of Crowded House's single "Fall At Your Feet" with Dean Brady. The song reached number 64 on the Triple J Hottest 100 2023.

== Activism ==
In September 2012, she featured in a campaign, 30 Songs / 30 Days, to support Half the Sky: Turning Oppression into Opportunity for Women Worldwide, a multi-platform media project inspired by Nicholas Kristof and Sheryl WuDunn's book of the same title.

== Personal life ==
Stone is married to musician and producer James Gilligan. Gilligan appears on Stone's albums Sixty Summers and Everything is Christmas.

== Discography ==
- The Memory Machine (2010)
- By the Horns (2012)
- Sixty Summers (2021)
- Everything Is Christmas (2021)

== Awards and nominations ==
=== APRA Awards ===
The APRA Awards are presented annually from 1982 by the Australasian Performing Right Association (APRA), "honouring composers and songwriters".

Year	Nominee / work	Award	Result
2011	Angus & Julia Stone (with Angus Stone)	Songwriter of the Year	Won
2011	"Big Jet Plane" (with Angus Stone)	Song of the Year	Won
2015	"Get Home" (with Angus Stone)	Blues & Roots Work of the Year	Nominated
2015	"Heart Beats Slow" (with Angus Stone)	Blues & Roots Work of the Year	Won
2015	"Heart Beats Slow" (with Angus Stone)	Song of the Year	Shortlisted
2018	"Snow" (with Angus Stone)	Song of the Year	Shortlisted
2019	"Chateau" (with Angus Stone)	Blues & Roots Work of the Year	Won

=== ARIA Music Awards ===
The ARIA Music Awards is an annual awards ceremony that recognises excellence, innovation, and achievement across all genres of Australian music.

Year	Nominee / work	Award	Result	Ref.
2008	Angus Stone, Julia Stone and Josh Groom for "Just a Boy" by Angus and Julia Stone	Best Video	Nominated	
2021	Jessie Hill for Julia Stone – "Dance"	Best Video	Nominated	

=== EG Awards / Music Victoria Awards ===
The EG Awards (known as Music Victoria Awards since 2013) are an annual awards night celebrating Victorian music. They commenced in 2006.

Year	Nominee / work	Award	Result
2012	Julia Stone	Best Female	Nominated
