= Angus Stone discography =

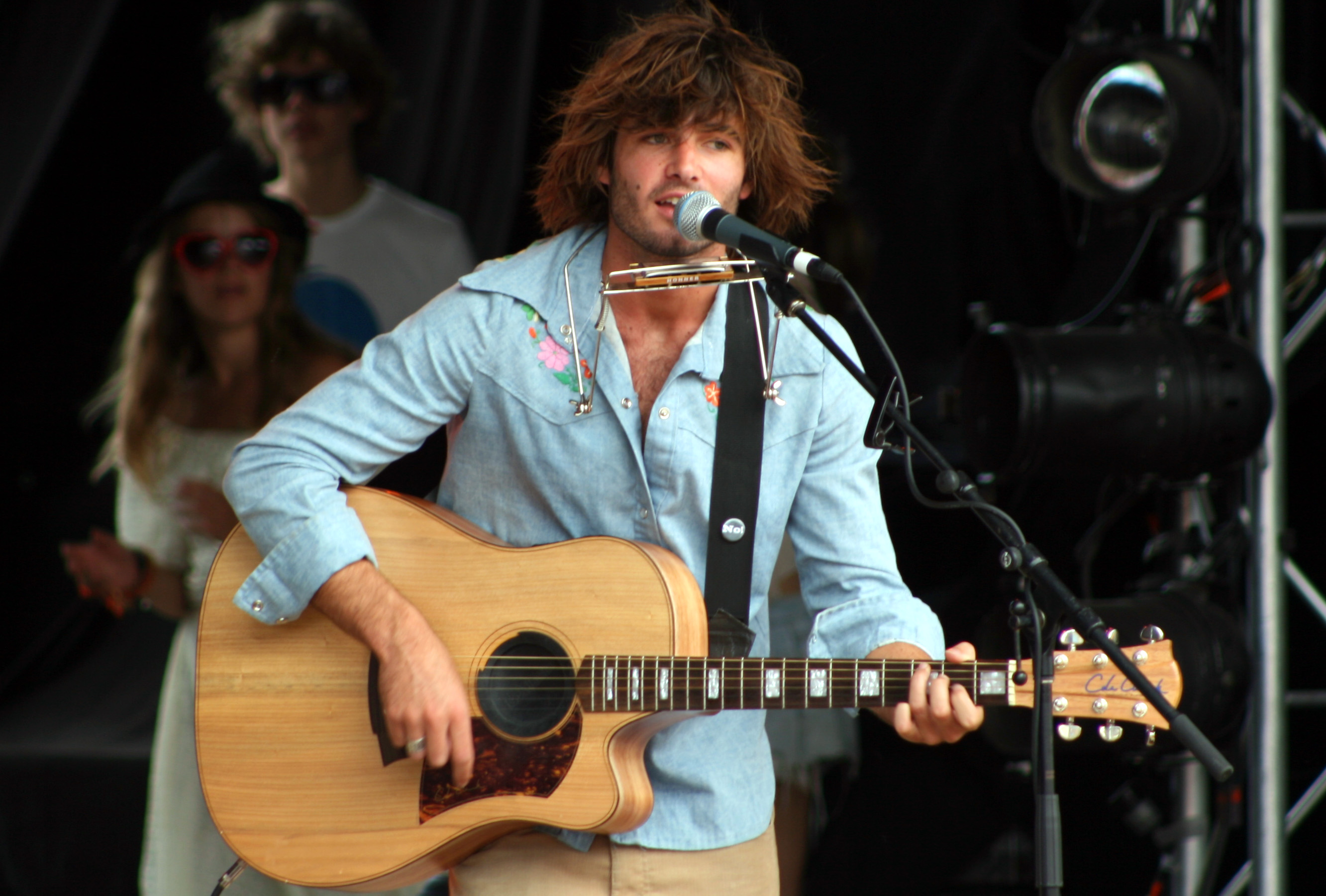
- Stone in 2007
- Studio albums: 6
- EPs: 1
- Singles: 22

The discography of Angus Stone, an Australian folk singer-songwriter, consists of six studio albums, one EPs and twenty-two singles. Stone has release music under the pseudonyms Lady of the Sunshine and Dope Lemon.

Stone also performs with sister Julia as the duo Angus & Julia Stone.

== Albums ==
=== Studio albums ===
List of studio albums, with release date, label, and selected chart positions shown
Title	Album details	Charts								Certifications
Title	Album details	AUS	BEL (Fl)	BEL (Wa)	FRA	GER	NED	NZ	SWI	Certifications
as Lady of the Sunshine
Smoking Gun	Released: April 2009; Label: Desert Harvest Records / EMI; Formats: CD, digital download	45	—	—	—	—	—	—	—	
as Angus Stone
Broken Brights	Released: 13 July 2012; Label: Desert Harvest Records; Formats: CD, digital download	2	23	26	67	67	42	32	27	ARIA: Gold
as Dope Lemon
Honey Bones	Released: 10 April 2016; Label: EMI Australia; Formats: CD, LP, digital download, streaming	11	—	—	—	74	—	—	—	
Smooth Big Cat	Released: 12 July 2019; Label: EMI; Formats: CD, LP, digital download, streaming	2	—	—	—	44	—	—	89	
Rose Pink Cadillac	Released: 7 January 2022; Label: Angus Stone, BMG; Formats: CD, LP, digital download, streaming	2	—	—	—	27	—	—	33	
Kimosabé	Released: 29 September 2023; Label: Angus Stone, BMG; Formats: CD, LP, digital download, streaming, CS	9	69	—	—	35	—	29	—	
Golden Wolf	Released: 2 May 2025; Label: Angus Stone, BMG; Formats: CD, LP, digital download, streaming, CS	8	163	—	—	46	—	32	78	

== Extended plays ==
List of EPs, with release date and label shown
Title	Extended play details
as Dope Lemon
Hounds Tooth	Released: 24 February 2017; Label: EMI; Formats: Digital download, streaming

== Singles ==
List of singles, with year released, selected chart positions, certifications, and album name shown
Title	Year	Peak chart positions		Album
Title	Year	NZ Hot	US AAA	Album
as Angus Stone
"Broken Brights"	2012	—	—	Broken Brights
"Bird on the Buffalo"	2012	—	—	Broken Brights
"Wooden Chair"	2012	—	—	Broken Brights
"The Blower's Daughter"	2012	—	—	Non-album single
"Monsters"	2012	—	—	Broken Brights
as Dope Lemon
"Uptown Folks"	2016	—	—	Honey Bones
"Marinade"	2016	—	—	Honey Bones
"Home Soon"	2017	—	—	Hounds Tooth
"Hey You"	2019	—	—	Big Smooth Cat
"Salt & Pepper"	2019	—	—	Big Smooth Cat
"Streets of Your Town"	2020	—	—	Songs for Australia
"Every Day Is a Holiday" (featuring Winston Surfshirt)	2020	25	—	Rose Pink Cadillac
"Kids Fallin' in Love"	2020	31	—	Rose Pink Cadillac
"Rose Pink Cadillac"	2021	16	34	Rose Pink Cadillac
"Stingray Pete"	2021	—	—	Rose Pink Cadillac
"Howl with Me"	2022	32	—	Rose Pink Cadillac
"I Want You (To Be My Woman)" (with Winston Surfshirt)	2022	—	—	Panna Cotta
"Kimosabé"	2023	37	—	Kimosabé
"Miami Baby"	2023	—	—	Kimosabé
"Derby Raceway"	2023	35	—	Kimosabé
"Golden Wolf"	2024	35	—	Golden Wolf
"Electric Green Lambo"	2025	—	—	Golden Wolf
"Sugarcat"	2025	—	—	Golden Wolf
"She's All Time" (featuring Nina Nesbitt)	2025	16	—	Golden Wolf

== Other charted songs ==
List of other charted songs, with year released, selected chart positions, and album name shown
Title	Year	Peak chart positions	Album
Title	Year	NZ Hot	Album
"John Belushi"	2025	33	Golden Wolf

== Guest appearances ==
List of guest appearances, with year released, featured artists and album name shown
Title	Year	Notes	Album	Certification
"River"	2007	Joni Mitchell cover by Stone for Various Artists' compilation	No Man's Woman	
"Four Seasons in One Day" (with Paul Kelly)	2010	Crowded House cover by Stone and Paul Kelly	He Will Have His Way	ARIA: Gold

== See also ==
- Angus and Julia Stone
