= Warner Music Australia =

Australian record label

- Logo used since 2020.
- Parent company: Warner Music Group
- Founded: 1969
- Country of origin: Australia
- Location: Sydney, New South Wales
- Official website: warnermusic.com.au

Warner Music Australia (WMA) is an Australian division of the Warner Music Group.

Warner Music Australia distributes in Australia, and also covers distribution in New Zealand.

== History ==
In 1969, Warner Bros. Records split and WEA was formed. It was first established in Canada and followed by Australia. The Australian operation began in July 1970, by Paul Turner with five staff members. The official launch was held at the Menzies Hotel in Sydney on 1 October 1970. The company was then based in Riley Street, Darlinghurst, and had three major labels: Warner Bros. Records, Elektra Records, and Atlantic Records

A year later Warner Bros. Records worldwide (including Australia) changed its name to Kinney Music. The monopoly laws in America at the time did not allow the three labels to trade as one, so the umbrella name of Kinney Music was chosen. For the first two years, the Australian Record Company (ARC), now known as Sony Music, handled the Australian distribution.

Turner's income for the first year was 1 million dollars. That was achieved in seven months, with the first years sales being just under $2 million. By 1 October 1972, U.S. monopoly laws had changed and WEA, using the first initial of each of the three main labels for its name, was born. From that time, WEA Australia had its own sales and distribution arm.

WEA became a major player in the Australian recording industry, through international successes of artists such as Fleetwood Mac, Phil Collins, Eric Clapton, Led Zeppelin and The Doors.

The company was renamed Warner Music Australia in 1990 and split into two divisions – WEA and East-West Records. With more focus being placed on domestic signings, phenomenal success was achieved with acts such as INXS, Cold Chisel, 1927 and Jenny Morris.

In the mid-to-late 1990s, Warner Music also invested in Brisbane bands, Regurgitator and Pretty Violet Stain. Regurgitator became Warner Music's first direct signing and remained with the company until 2004. In 2005, Sire Records invested in Brisbane band The Veronicas, who went straight to number two with their debut single "4 Ever" and their album "The Secret Life of the Veronicas". Later that year, Warner Music Australia bought out Festival-Mushroom Records for $12 million and closed the label, while retaining the use of the Mushroom label for a couple of acts such as Eskimo Joe and Gabriella Cilmi.

As of 2010, the company has continued with artists such as Kerser, Lisa Mitchell, Kylie Minogue, the New Zealand band, Evermore, as well as the newly signed Brisbane act, Dead Letter Circus. Warner Music also invested heavily in producers such as ShockOne and Matt Lange.

== Artists ==
- A Boogie wit da Hoodie
- A Day to Remember
- AB6IX
- The Adults
- Kita Alexander
- All Time Low
- The Amity Affliction
- Lara Andallo
- Angel Dust
- Anitta
- Anne-Marie
- Arizona
- Billie Joe Armstrong
- Asher
- Ashnikko
- Ava Max
- BabyT
- The Band Camino
- Bazzi
- Alec Benjamin
- Melisa Bester
- BBG Smokey
- David Bowie
- Bhad Bhabie
- Biffy Clyro
- Billy Talent
- Birdy
- The Black Keys
- James Blunt
- Breland
- Bronson
- Bruno Mars
- Bryce Vine
- Michael Bublé
- Budjerah
- Burna Boy
- Busby Marou
- Cardi B
- Cavetown
- Cecily
- Charli XCX
- Cher
- Kelly Clarkson
- Sabrina Claudio
- Clean Bandit
- Client Liaison
- Code Orange
- Coheed & Cambria
- Coldplay
- Phil Collins
- Creeper
- Daine
- Dan + Shay
- Nathan Dawe
- Deftones
- Jason Derulo
- L Devine
- Marina Diamandis
- Diplo
- Disturbed
- The Doors
- Dutchavelli
- Eagles
- East AV3
- EcoSystem
- Ekali
- Elderbrook
- Missy Elliott
- Eskimo Joe
- Morgan Evans
- Faith No More
- Faouzia
- Feki
- Fever 333
- Harper Finn
- Fitz and the Tantrums
- The Flaming Lips
- Fleetwood Mac
- Flowerkid
- Foals
- Aretha Franklin
- The Front Bottoms
- Galantis
- Liam Gallagher
- Galxara
- Ali Gatie
- Glades
- Jess Glynne
- Gojira
- Golden Features
- Goo Goo Dolls
- Gorillaz
- Grandma
- Jack Gray
- Green Day
- Griff
- Josh Groban
- Grouplove
- Gucci Mane
- David Guetta
- Halestorm
- Hamilton
- Hamzaa
- Carlie Hanson
- Jack Harlow
- Hartley
- Scott Helman
- Higher Power
- Highly Suspect
- The Highwomen
- Hobo Johnson
- Hooligan Hefs
- Honne
- In This Moment
- Illy
- Iron Maiden
- J Rick
- Janelle Monáe
- JoJo
- Joyous Wolf
- Jubël
- Jxdn
- JXN
- Kaleo
- Kehlani
- Killboy
- Kinder
- The Kite String Tangle
- Hayley Kiyoko
- The Knocks
- Korn
- Kranium
- Kyle
- Lianne La Havas
- k.d lang
- Led Zeppelin
- Lil Jaye
- Lil Pump
- Lil Skies
- Lil Zay Osama
- Linkin Park
- Dua Lipa
- Lizzo
- Lukas Graham
- Matt Maeson
- Mahalia
- Major Lazer
- The Magic Gang
- Briston Maroney
- Melanie Martinez
- Master KG
- Mastedon
- Matoma
- Meek Mill
- Ashley McBryde
- Mac Miller
- Kylie Minogue
- Mist
- MisterWives
- Monique Lawz
- Motionless in White
- Muse
- My Chemical Romance
- Nasty Cherry
- Needtobreathe
- Nickelback
- NLE Choppa
- No Comply
- Nomad
- Nothing, Nowhere.
- Oliver Tree
- One Ok Rock
- Rita Ora
- Pa Salieu
- Paramore
- PartyNextDoor
- Perto
- Maisie Peters
- Sloan Peterson
- Pink Sweats
- Thelma Plum
- Prince
- Charlie Puth
- Pvris
- Ramones
- Red Hot Chili Peppers
- Bebe Rexha
- Rico Nasty
- RINI
- RMR
- Roddy Ricch
- Rory Noble Copy
- Royal Blood
- Rudimental
- S1mba
- Safia
- Saint Motel
- Sam Feldt
- Saweetie
- Robin Schulz
- Ed Sheeran
- Blake Shelton
- Shihad
- Shinedown
- ShockOne
- Shoreline Mafia
- Sia
- Skrillex
- Slipknot
- Smith & Myers
- The Snuts
- Stone Sour
- Stormzy
- Sub Urban
- JC Stewart
- Rod Stewart
- Sueco
- Tayla Parx
- Corey Taylor
- Theory of a Deadman
- Rob Thomas
- Thomston
- Tiesto
- Tinie Tempah
- Don Toliver
- Trey Songz
- Trivium
- Tina Turner
- Turnstile
- Tviling
- Twenty One Pilots
- Ty Dolla Sign
- UNO Stereo
- Veruca Salt
- Wafia
- Wale
- Wallows
- Weezer
- Whethan
- Whipped Cream
- Why Don't We
- Hayley Williams
- John Williamson
- Wiz Khalifa
- The Wombats
- YBN Cordae
- YFN Lucci
- Neil Young
- YoungBoy Never Broke Again
- Chase Zera

== Former artists ==
- 1927
- Ben Abraham
- Zoë Badwi
- Bang the Drum
- Bardot
- Boom Crash Opera
- Brothers 3
- Kasey Chambers
- Kim Churchill
- Cold Chisel
- Cookin' on 3 Burners
- Dead Letter Circus
- Xavier Dunn
- Dylan Joel
- Evermore
- Euphoria
- The Ferrets
- Kiley Gaffney
- Goanna
- Gyan
- Gyroscope
- Hopium
- INXS
- Karmadella
- Kerser
- Magic Dirt
- Make Them Suffer
- Mass Collective Mind
- Lisa Mitchell
- Moonlight
- Jenny Morris
- Shannon Noll
- Katie Noonan
- Panic! at the Disco
- Christina Parie
- Pretty Violet Stain
- Regurgitator
- Archie Roach
- Dane Rumble
- The Sharp
- Stone Temple Pilots
- The Sundance Kids
- Super Cruel
- The Superjesus
- Thirsty Merc
- Throttle
- Titanium
- Turquoise Prince
- Vassy
- The Whitlams
- Ross Wilson

== Warner Vision Australia ==
Warner Vision Australia, a company of Warner Music Australasia, released a series of VHS and DVD on the History of the Olympic Games:

- The Official Films of the Olympic Games: London 1948 (Volume 1)
- The Official Films of the Olympic Games: Melbourne 1956 (Volume 2)
- The Official Films of the Olympic Games: Rome 1960 (Volume 3)
- The Official Films of the Olympic Games: Tokyo 1964 (Volume 4)
- The Official Films of the Olympic Games: Mexico City 1968 (Volume 5)
- The Official Films of the Olympic Games: Montreal 1976 (Volume 6)
- The Official Films of the Olympic Games: Moscow 1980 (Volume 7)
- The Official Films of the Olympic Games: Los Angeles 1984 (Volume 8)
- The Official Films of the Olympic Games: Seoul 1988 (Volume 9)
- The Official Films of the Olympic Games: Barcelona 1992 (Volume 10)
- The Official Films of the Olympic Games: Atlanta 1996 (Volume 11)

Warner Music Vision Australia released a series of DVDs as a joint-venue with the Nine Network:

- Ray Martin Presents: Graham Kennedy – The King of Television
- The Best of the Paul Hogan Show
- Channel Nine Salutes Bert Newton
- The Best of the Don Lane Show
- Paul Hogan's England
- Studio 9 Unplugged
- Laughs & Larrikins: Midday With Ray Martin
- Golden Logies Moments
- Hey Hey It's Saturday ... By Request
- Hey Hey It's Saturday ... By Request 2

== See also ==
- Lists of record labels
