= Whipped Cream =

Whipped Cream can refer to:

- Whipped cream, food
- Whipped Cream (band), Swedish rock band formed in 1989
- "Whipped Cream" (song), a 1965 instrumental by Herb Alpert & the Tijuana Brass
- Schlagobers, 1924 ballet by Richard Strauss
- "Whipped Cream", a song on Ari Lennox's album Shea Butter Baby
- Whipped Cream (DJ), Canadian DJ and record producer
