= Old Mates =

Compilation album by Dune Rats
- Released: 6 March 2026
- Recorded: 2010–2013, 2025
- Length: Dune Rats, G.Y.R.O.
- Label: Dune Rats

Dune Rats chronology
If It Sucks, Turn It Up (2024)	Old Mates (2026)

Singles from Old Mates
- 1. "Sharks" Released: 16 January 2026; 2. "Ratbags! (Re-recorded)" Released: 6 March 2026

Old Mates is a compilation album by Australian rock band Dune Rats. It was released on 6 March 2026. The album collects fan-favourite tracks from the band's first three EPs - Dune Rats (2011), Social Atoms (2012) and Smile (2013) - alongside three re-recorded tracks and the new single "Sharks".

The album will be supported with the Old Mates tour with the band performing their old favorites.

== Track listing ==
Side A
No.	Title	Writer(s)	Original EP	Length
1.	"Colour Television"	Michael Bylund-Cloonan; Brett Jansch; Daniel Moffitt	Sexy Beach	2:10
2.	"Red Light Green Light"	Bylund-Cloonan; Jansch; Moffitt	Smile	1:54
3.	"Pogo"	Bylund-Cloonan; Jansch; Moffitt	Social Atoms	2:46
4.	"Stoner Pop"	Bylund-Cloonan; Jansch; Moffitt	Smile	2:32
5.	"Woo"	Bylund-Cloonan; Jansch; Moffitt	Sexy Beach	3:09
6.	"Sun Zapper"	Bylund-Cloonan; Jansch; Moffitt	Sexy Beach	1:53

Side B
No.	Title	Writer(s)	Original EP	Length
1.	"Social Atoms"	Bylund-Cloonan; Jansch; Moffitt	Social Atoms	2:31
2.	"Fr(i)ends"	Bylund-Cloonan; Jansch; Moffitt	Social Atoms	1:59
3.	"F it!" (re-recorded)	Bylund-Cloonan; Jansch; Moffitt	Smile	2:02
4.	"On Our Own!" (re-recorded)	Bylund-Cloonan; Jansch; Moffitt	Social Atoms	1:47
5.	"Ratbags!" (re-recorded)	Bylund-Cloonan; Jansch; Moffitt	Sexy Beach	2:59
6.	"Sharks"	Bylund-Cloonan; Zac Carper; Jansch; Moffitt	new recording	3:41

== Charts ==
Weekly chart performance of Old Mates
Chart (2026)	Peak position
Australian Artist Albums (ARIA)	13
Australian Vinyl Albums (ARIA)	16
