= Bang the Drum =

Bang the Drum may refer to:

- Bang the Drum (band), a 1989–1991 Australian pop rock group
- Bang the Drum (album), by Mango Groove, 2009
- Bang the Drum EP, by INXS, 2004
- "Bang the Drum", a song by Bryan Adams and Nelly Furtado from the 2010 Winter Olympics opening ceremony

== See also ==
- "Bang a Drum", a 1990 song by Jon Bon Jovi
