= Kimosabè =

Studio album by Dope Lemon
- Released: 29 September 2023
- Length: 44:17
- Label: BMG
- Producers: Dope Lemon; Reyne House

Dope Lemon chronology
Rose Pink Cadillac (2022)	Kimosabè (2023)	Golden Wolf (2025)

Kimosabè is the sixth studio album by Australian musician Angus Stone, and his fourth under the name Dope Lemon. It was released on 29 September 2023 through BMG Rights Management.

The title track and lead single features a sample from the 2008 film Step Brothers.

Upon announcement in July 2023, Stone said, "This record is everything that's me. In the past, the artwork has been anonymous in a way because I was trying to explore these styles, and having this shield in front of me was beautiful – I could sort of slink around in the shadows and wouldn't have the public make judgement on the person behind it. This record, I had moments of clarity reflecting on my childhood, and I was able to see where I want to be in the future. So putting myself on the cover just felt right."

The album was supported with two shows on 14 and 15 September 2023; one at The Forum, Melbourne and one at the Sydney Opera House.

The album was nominated for Best Record at the Rolling Stone Australia Awards.

At the AIR Awards of 2024, the album was nominated for Best Independent Blues and Roots Album or EP. At the 2024 ARIA Music Awards, the album was nominated for Best Blues and Roots Album.

== Track listing ==
Kimosabè track listing
No.	Title	Writer(s)	Length
1.	"Kimosabè"	Angus Stone; Ben Edgar; Will Ferrell; Adam McKay	4:36
2.	"Derby Raceway"	Stone; Edgar	3:48
3.	"Golden God"	Stone; Edgar	6:02
4.	"Miami Baby"	Stone; Elliott Hammond	4:53
5.	"Just You and Me"	Stone; Edgar	3:50
6.	"Blue Moon Fox"	Stone; Brad Heald	4:27
7.	"Broke Down Casino" (featuring Sloan Peterson)	Stone; Joannah-Grace Jackson	3:20
8.	"Slinging Dimes"	Stone	3:33
9.	"Give Me That Fire"	Stone	3:45
10.	"Lemon Tree"	Stone; Heald	5:58
Total length:			44:17

== Personnel ==
Musicians

- Dope Lemon – vocals (all tracks), bass (tracks 3, 8), synthesizer (8)
- Leigh Fisher – percussion (all tracks), drums (1–9)
- Ben Edgar – electric guitar (1–8, 10), bass (1, 2, 7), banjo (3), acoustic guitar (4), pedal steel guitar (6), additional programming (7)
- Thomas Bartlett – piano, synthesizer (1–9); Mellotron (1, 2, 4–6, 8, 9), Wurlitzer (1), clavinet (3)
- Elliott Hammond – bass, drums, organ, percussion, piano, vocals (4)
- Brad Heald – bass, drums, piano (6, 9); percussion, samples, synthesizer, vocals (6, 10); piano, sitar, strings, Wurlitzer (6); organ, zither (10)
- Joanna-Grace Jackson – vocals (7)
- Chris Bevens – flute (10)
- Ferraris Sisters – vocals (10)

Technical

- Dope Lemon – production, engineering
- Reyne House – production (4), engineering (1–4)
- Brian Lucey – engineering
- Eric J – engineering
- Paul Pilseniks – engineering
- Ben Edgar – engineering (1–8, 10)
- George Georgiadis – engineering (6)

== Charts ==
Chart performance for Kimosabé
Chart (2023)	Peak position
Australian Albums (ARIA)	9
Belgian Albums (Ultratop Flanders)	69
German Albums (Offizielle Top 100)	35
New Zealand Albums (RMNZ)	29
