= Drown in Colour =

Studio album by Red Riders
- Released: 10 July 2009
- Recorded: 2009
- Studios: Megaphon Studios, Petersham
- Genre: Indie rock
- Length: 39:53
- Label: Universal/Ivy League
- Producer: Woody Annison

Red Riders chronology
Replica Replica (2006)	Drown in Colour (2009)

Singles from Drown in Colour
- 1. "You've Got a Lot of Nerve" Released: 1 May 2009; 2. "Ordinary" Released: 2009

Drown in Colour is the second album by Australian indie rock band, Red Riders, which was released on 10 July 2009 and peaked at No. 59 on the ARIA Albums Chart. It is the first Red Riders album with new guitarist, Brad Heald, who had replaced founding member, Adrian Deutsch in December 2008.

== Background ==
Drown in Colour was recorded by Red Riders line-up of Matt Chapman on bass guitar and backing vocals, Al Grigg on lead vocals and guitar, Brad Heald on lead guitar and Tom Wallace on drums and backing vocals. Heald (ex-the Vines) had replaced founding member, Adrian Deutsch in December 2008. The album was produced by Woody Annison (Pound System, Rocket Science) at Megaphon Studios, Petersham, Sydney for Ivy League Records/Universal Music Australia and mixed at Studio One, Collingwood. The recording sessions were completed within four weeks in early 2009. The group had toured Australia in support of Franz Ferdinand before releasing Drown in Colour on 10 July 2009, which peaked at No. 59 on the ARIA Albums Chart. Red Riders promoted its second album with a headlining east coast tour from 13 November to 31 December and were joined by the Boat People and the Last Dinosaurs. It was available on iTunes Australia with an album-only bonus track, "Higher".

The first single from Drown in Colour, "You've Got a Lot of Nerve", was issued for download-only on 1 May 2009, and has the b-side "I Will Never". It was launched later in May at Sydney's Annandale Hotel. The accompanying stop-motion music video was directed by Chris Hopkins. The second single, "Ordinary", had an accompanying music video, which was produced by Melbourne-based agency Moop Jaw. It was directed by Ryan Fraser and produced by Rhett Wade-Ferrell. Warran Wright was responsible for its art direction. Sputnikmusic's AtavanHalen, rated Drown in Colour at three-and-a-half-out-of-five, and explained, "an enjoyable release, one that fans will grow to like more and more with each listen. There are still things to be tweaked and rectified, but there’s no doubt we’re looking at a revitalised band with a newfound sense of purpose."

== Bonus demo tape ==
Initial copies of the album sold at selected music stores (Red Eye in Sydney, Fish Records in Newtown or Leichhardt, Missing Link in Melbourne, Rockinghorse in Brisbane, Planet in Perth, Krypton in Adelaide, Big Star in Adelaide and JB Hi-Fi online) included a bonus cassette tape, Drown in Colour - Demos (2007–2009),. It contained demo versions of eight album tracks and three non-album tracks ("This Song Is a Gun", "The Fool!" and "The Ballad of Nick Carraway"). The tape contains a copy of a handwritten note by lead singer, Alex Grigg, dated 22 May 2009, which reads:

Hey there, thanks heaps for pre-ordering our new record. Here's some demo recordings of a bunch of the tracks that made the cut (and a few also rans that didn't. The sound quality's kind of crummy, but then again so is most of the playing. Anyway, hope you like 'em! Viva la cassette!

== Commercial use ==
The album's opening track, "Tomorrow/Today", was used over the end credits of Australian TV teen drama, Home and Away, on 22 July 2009. "Ordinary" was used for an ABC advertising campaign from late July to early September 2009.

== Track listing ==
=== Album ===
Track listing adapted from AllMusic:

All tracks are written by Alexander Grigg, unless otherwise indicated

Drown in Colour via Universal/Ivy League (IVY082)
No.	Title	Length
1.	"Tomorrow/Today"	3:11
2.	"Ordinary"	3:01
3.	"You've Got a Lot of Nerve"	3:48
4.	"Feels Like Grace"	4:17
5.	"All Mine"	4:15
6.	"So Long"	3:19
7.	"Over Again"	3:49
8.	"The Beginning of the End of the Night"	3:22
9.	"Never Gonna Be Enough"	3:26
10.	"The Siren Sings"	4:12
11.	"Farewell Cruel City"	3:13
12.	"Higher" (iTunes pre-order bonus track)	4:09

=== Bonus demo tape ===
Side A

1. Tomorrow/Today
2. Ordinary
3. You've Got a Lot of Nerve
4. Feels Like Grace
5. This Song Is a Gun
6. The Fool!

Side B

1. The Ballad of Nick Carraway (Adrian Deutsch)
2. The Beginning of the End of the Night
3. Never Gonna Be Enough
4. The Siren Sings
5. Farewell Cruel City

== Charts ==
Chart performance for Drown in Colour
Chart (2009)	Peak position
Australian Albums (ARIA)	59
