= Replica Replica =

Studio album by Red Riders
- Released: 21 October 2006
- Recorded: 2006
- Studio: Rockinghorse Studios, Byron Bay
- Genre: Indie rock
- Length: 37:15
- Label: Ivy League
- Producer: Woody Annison

Red Riders chronology
| The Plan A (2005) | Replica Replica (2006) | Drown In Colour (2009) |

Replica Replica, released on 21 October 2006, is the debut studio album by Australian indie rock band, Red Riders. It appeared via Ivy League Records and peaked at No. 9 on the ARIA Hitseekers Albums Chart. The album was produced by Woody Annison (Pound System, Rocket Science), recorded at Rockinghorse Studios in Byron Bay, and mixed at Studio 01 in Melbourne.

== Track listing ==
1. "C'mon" - 3:03
2. "Slide In Next to Me" - 3:06
3. "A.S.P.I.R.I.N" - 3:50
4. "In My Sleep" - 4:31
5. "My Love Is Stronger Than Your Love" - 3:00
6. "Crawl Back Baby" - 4:18
7. "What They Say About Us" - 2:48
8. "Scream" - 3:45
9. "Live in the Stars" - 3:35
10. "Daylight" - 5:20
