= Dune Rats =

Australian rock band

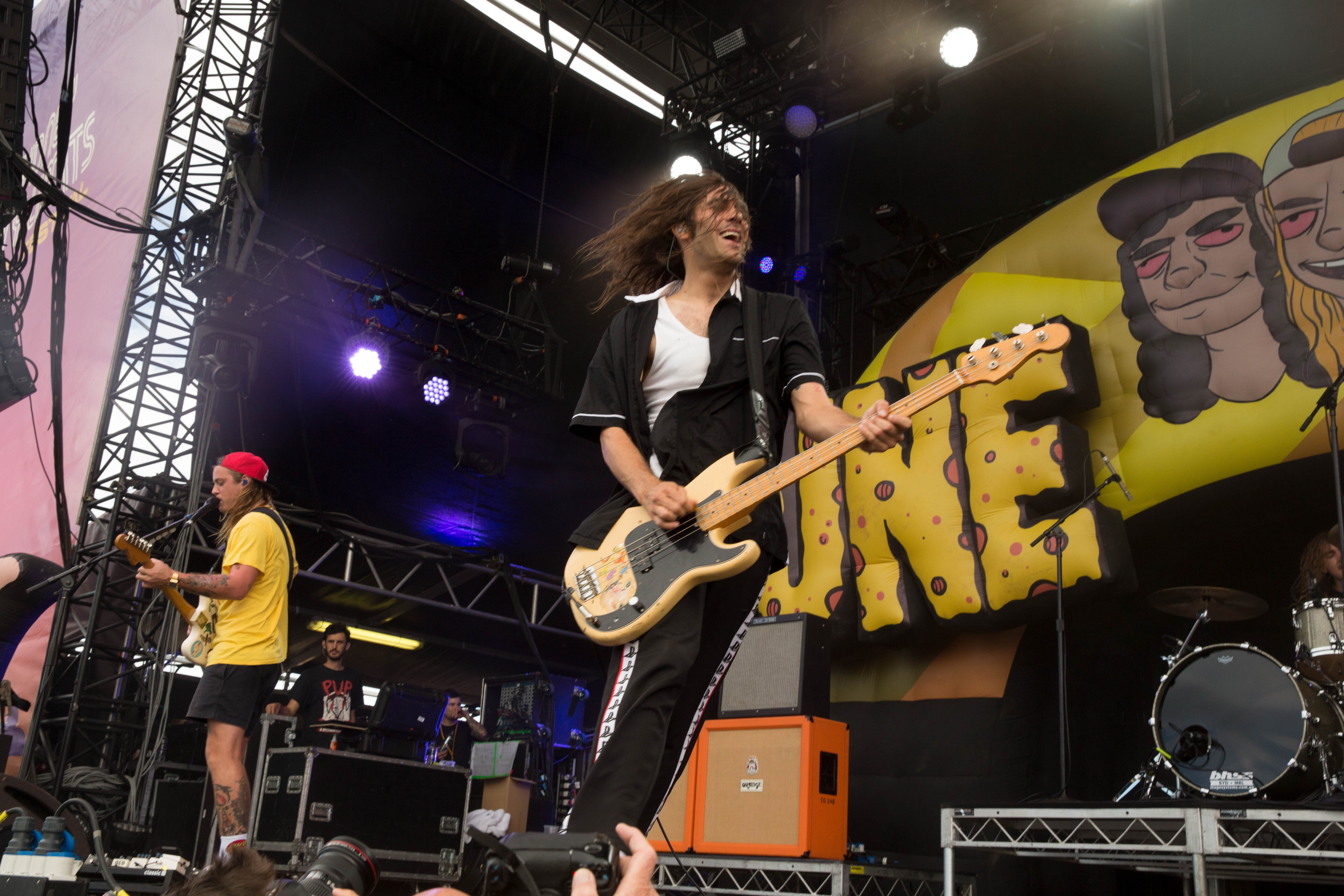
- Dune Rats performing in 2018

Background information
- Also known as: Dunies
- Origin: Brisbane, Queensland, Australia
- Genres: Surf punk, indie rock, garage punk, pop punk
- Years active: 2010–present
- Labels: Ratbag, BMG
- Members: Danny Beus; BC Michaels; Brett Jansch
- Website: dunerats.tv

Dune Rats are an Australian rock band from Brisbane, Queensland. Originally, the band formed as a duo, with Danny Beus on guitar and lead vocals and Beer Can on drums and backing vocals. The band later became a three-piece, with Brett Jansch (formerly a touring member of Bleeding Knees Club) joining as bassist. Brad Heald, originally from Red Riders and The Vines, also made touring appearances on bass from 2011 to 2012.

The band uploaded "Colour Television" onto Triple J Unearthed in October 2010, before officially releasing it the following month.

On 30 May 2014, the band released their self-titled debut album through their label Ratbag Records. They supported the release with a global and national tour. The following year they announced that they were officially launching Ratbag Records as a record label that would take on other performers.

On 11 February 2017, their second album The Kids Will Know It's Bullshit debuted at number one on the ARIA Albums Chart.

The group's fourth studio album, Real Rare Whale was announced on 11 February 2022 and was scheduled for release on 24 June 2022, before being delayed to July 29 due to vinyl manufacturing issues.

In May 2024, the group announced the release of their fifth studio album, If It Sucks, Turn It Up.

In March 2026, the group released the compilation Old Mates, an album featuring tracks from their first three EPs.

== Discography ==
=== Studio albums ===
List of studio albums, with release date, label, and selected chart positions shown
Title	Album details	Peak chart positions
Title	Album details	AUS
Dune Rats	Released: 30 May 2014; Label: Ratbag (RATBAG003)	22
The Kids Will Know It's Bullshit	Released: 20 January 2017; Label: Ratbag (RATBAG009)	1
Hurry Up and Wait	Released: 31 January 2020; Label: Ratbag, BMG (RATBAG019)	1
Real Rare Whale	Released: 29 July 2022; Label: BMG (538720702)	6
If It Sucks, Turn It Up	Released: 2 August 2024; Label: BMG (964034711)	29

=== Compilation albums ===
List of compilation albums, with release date and label
Title	Album details	Peak chart positions
Title	Album details	AUS Artist
Old Mates	Released: 6 March 2026; Label: Dune Rats, G.Y.R.O.	13

=== Extended plays ===
List of extended plays, with selected details
Title	EP details
Sexy Beach	Released: 1 February 2011; Label: Dune Rats/ Inertia Access
Social Atoms	Released: 2 September 2011; Label: Dune Rats/ Inertia Access
Smile	Released: 19 April 2013; Label: Inertia Access

=== Singles ===
Title	Year	Album
"Colour Television"	2010	Sexy Beach
"Wooo!"	2011	Sexy Beach
"Pogo"	2011	Social Atoms
"Fuck It"	2012	Smile
"Red Light, Green Light"	2013	Smile
"Funny Guy"	2014	Dune Rats
"Superman"	2014	Dune Rats
"Bullshit"	2016	The Kids Will Know It's Bullshit
"Scott Green"	2016	The Kids Will Know It's Bullshit
"Braindead"	2017	The Kids Will Know It's Bullshit
"6 Pack"	2017	The Kids Will Know It's Bullshit
"Demolition Derby"	2017	The Kids Will Know It's Bullshit
"No Plans"	2019	Hurry Up and Wait
"Rubber Arm"	2019	Hurry Up and Wait
"Crazy"	2019	Hurry Up and Wait
"Stupid Is as Stupid Does" (featuring K.Flay)	2020	Hurry Up and Wait
"Bad Habits"	2020	Hurry Up and Wait
"Too Tough Terry"	2020	Non-album single
"Up"	2021	Real Rare Whale
"What a Memorable Night"	2022	Real Rare Whale
"Melted Into Two"	2022	Real Rare Whale
"Pamela Aniston"	2022	Real Rare Whale
"Am I Ever Gonna See Your Face Again" (Like a Version)	2023	Non-album single (Note: Later included on the 2025 compilation Triple J's Best Australian Like A Version)
"Be Like You"	2023	If It Sucks, Turn It Up
"Solar Eyes"	2024	If It Sucks, Turn It Up
"Cheapskate"	2024	If It Sucks, Turn It Up
"If It Sucks, Turn It Up"	2024	If It Sucks, Turn It Up
"Dead, Rich or in Jail" (with Fidlar)	2024	
"Sharks"	2026	Old Mates
"Ratbags!" (Re-recorded)	2026	Old Mates

==== As featured artist ====
Title	Year	Artist
"Mexico"	2016	Drapht
"Keys to the City"	2021	Drapht
"Bored"	2022	Ocean Grove

=== Music videos ===
Title	Year	Director(s)
"Wooo!"	2011	Oliver Duncan
"Pogo"	2011	Anthony Salsone
"Fuck It"	2012	Anthony Salsone
"Red Light, Green Light" (Red Version)	2013	Toby Cregan
"Red Light, Green Light" (Green Version)	2013	Pilerats
"Superman"	2014	Toby Cregan
"Dalai Lama, Big Banana, Marijuana"	2014	Diego Cristófano
"Bullshit"	2016	Macario De Souza & Allan Hardy
"Scott Green"	2016	Macario De Souza
"Scott Green" (Performance Version)	2017	Macario De Souza
"Braindead"	2017	Jonathan Salfield
"6 Pack"	2017	Vorn Hunt
"Demolition Derby"	2017	Vorn Hunt
"No Plans"	2019	James Medlam
"Rubber Arm"	2019	Glendon and Isabella
"Crazy"	2019	Macario De Souza & Allan Hardy
"Stupid Is as Stupid Does" (featuring K.Flay)	2020	Hype Republic
"Bad Habits"	2020	Dune Rats, Matty Woo & Tom Healy
"Too Tough Terry"	2020	Reid McManus
"Up"	2021	Natalie Sim
"What a Memorable Night"	2022	Jarred Lammiman
"Melted Into Two"	2022	Kelly Holden
"Pamela Aniston"	2022	Vorn Hunt
"Space Cadet"	2022	Alex Flamsteed
"LTD"	2023	Unknown
"Be Like You"	2023	Unknown
"Solar Eyes"	2024	Alex Flamsteed
"Cheapskate"	2024	Tom Carroll
"If It Sucks, Turn It Up"	2024	Callum Scott-Dyson
"Rich Kid Rehab"	2024	Jeordie Davis
"Sharks"	2026	unknown
"Ratbags"	2026	unknown

== Awards and nominations ==
=== AIR Awards ===
The Australian Independent Record Awards (commonly known informally as AIR Awards) is an annual awards night to recognise, promote and celebrate the success of Australia's Independent Music sector.

Year	Nominee / work	Award	Result	Ref.
2025	If It Sucks, Turn It Up	Best Independent Punk Album or EP	Nominated	

=== APRA Music Awards ===
The APRA Music Awards were established by Australasian Performing Right Association (APRA) in 1982 to honour the achievements of songwriters and music composers, and to recognise their song writing skills, sales and airplay performance, by its members annually.

Year	Nominee / work	Award	Result	Ref.
2025	"Be Like You"	Most Performed Rock Work	Nominated	

=== ARIA Music Awards ===
The ARIA Music Awards are a set of annual ceremonies presented by Australian Recording Industry Association (ARIA), which recognise excellence, innovation, and achievement across all genres of the music of Australia. They commenced in 1987.

Year	Nominee / work	Award	Result	Ref.
2017	The Kids Will Know It's Bullshit	Best Rock Album	Nominated	
2022	Real Rare Whale	Best Hard Rock or Heavy Metal Album	Nominated	
2024	If It Sucks, Turn It Up	Best Hard Rock or Heavy Metal Album	Nominated	
2025	Dune Rats – Tooheys: I Feel Like a Tooheys (Thinkerbell)	Best Use of an Australian Recording in an Advertisement	Nominated	
