= Red Riders =

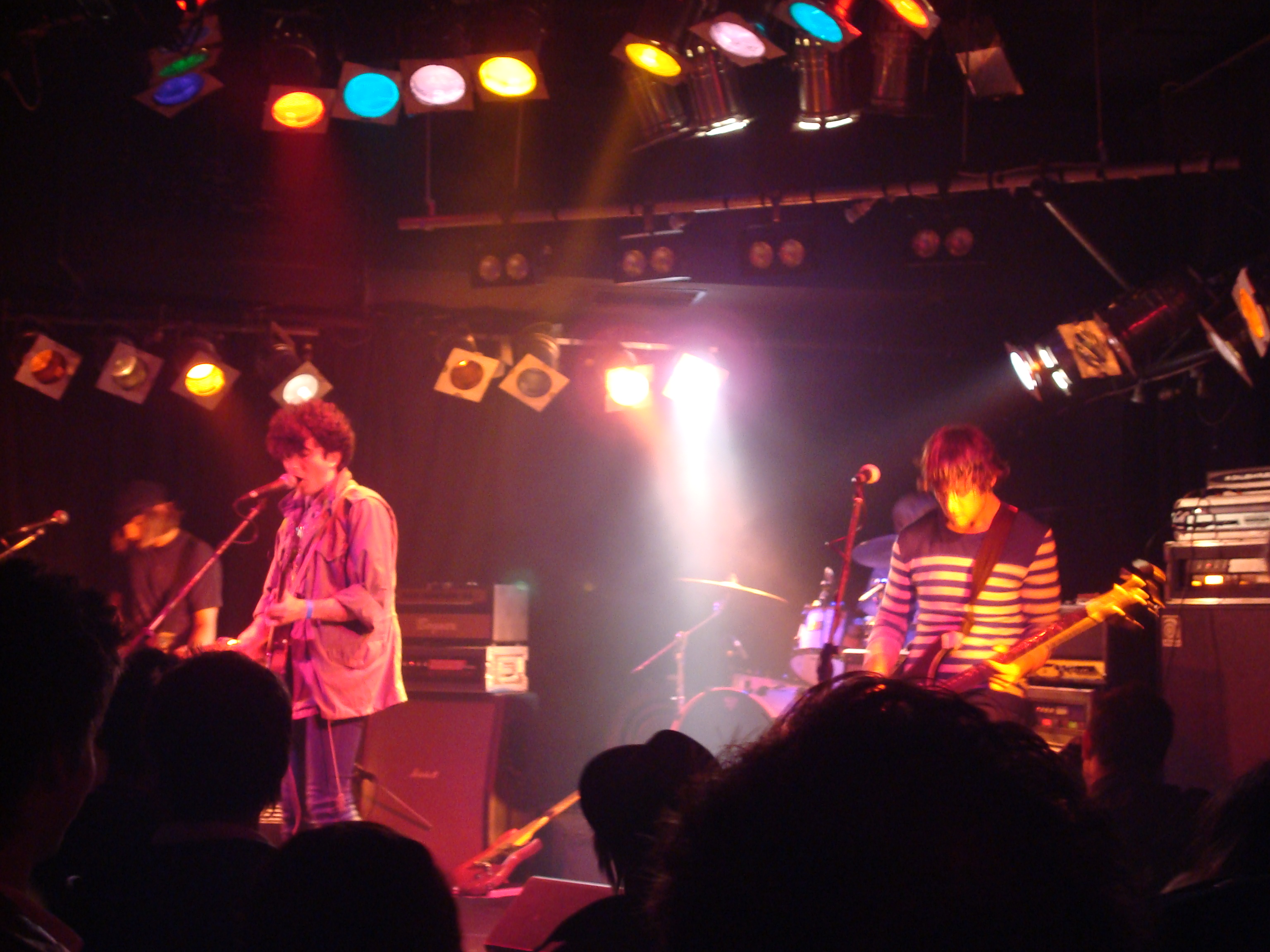

Background information
- Origin: Sydney, New South Wales, Australia
- Genres: Indie rock, alternative rock
- Years active: 2003–2011, 2017, 2021
- Labels: Reverberation; Ivy League Records
- Past members: Matt Chapman; Alexander Grigg; Tom Wallace; Adrian Deutsch; Brad Heald
- Website: Official site

Red Riders were an Australian indie rock band formed in Sydney in 2003. After releasing two EPs and a single, the band released their debut album, Replica Replica in October 2006. The band announced that they would be splitting up via their Facebook page on 5 April 2011.

== History ==
Alexander Grigg and Adrian Deutsch first met at a Black Rebel Motorcycle Club gig in 2002. After discovering a common interest in music, and developing a number of songs, Deutsch asked childhood friend Mathew Chapman – who was then residing in New Zealand – to join and play bass, despite being a guitarist who had never played bass before. Chapman would later meet drummer Tom Wallace on a flight to Australia.

The band would play their first show at a backyard party in 2003, before plying their trade across the network of pubs and small venues of Sydney. They picked up support slots in early 2004 with The Sleepy Jackson and Jet. The band were then asked to be the national opening act for Franz Ferdinand's sold out Australian tour, before releasing their debut self-titled EP. The lead track, Tune In/Tune Out, would gain regular air play on JJJ, FBi, ZzZ, RAR and other community radio networks.

After signing with the Sydney-based label Ivy League, the band would release their second EP, The Plan A, in October 2005, and would embark on a national tour with Faker, taking them to larger stages and introducing them to new audiences.

After playing on what band members described as 'the dream Big Day Out line up' in 2006 with The Stooges, The White Stripes, Franz Ferdinand, Kings of Leon and The Magic Numbers, the band would spend part of 2006 recording in Byron Bay, and would only be seen sporadically, including headlining the local stage at the Sydney June long weekend festival Come Together.

The band released their debut album Replica Replica in October 2006. Containing ten songs, Alex and Adrian would both sing five songs apiece.

The band would then embark on their biggest national tour to date, supporting The Living End. The tour would take the Red Riders extensively across Australia, before seeing them close the year with a set headlining the Hopetoun Stage at the Homebake festival. Despite being billed to play at the same time as the returning Silverchair, who were playing their first full set in 4 years, the Red Riders still managed to pull a large audience to their set.

The album received extensive air play on national youth radio station Triple J while the first single 'Slide in Next To Me' was voted in at number 96 in the 2006 Hottest 100.

2007 would see the band play the Big Day Out again, along with a national tour with Dappled Cities, and also begin planning for a new album, which would eventually become Drown in Colour.

In January 2008, Adrian Deutsch announced via his Myspace page he was leaving the band to concentrate on his solo career. His last show was at the Ivy League tenth anniversary concert, where the Red Riders would play alongside other Ivy League acts such as The Vines, Youth Group and The Mess Hall. He was replaced by The Vines bassist Brad Heald.

The band supported Franz Ferdinand once again, this time on their January 2009 Australian tour.

On 9 April 2009, 'You've Got A Lotta Nerve', which was first single off their then-forthcoming album, was released on MySpace. Their second album, "Drown in Colour," was released later in the year. The album title was supposedly taken from a song that the band decided not to include in the final track-listing. Select independent record stores around Australia were also issued with limited edition Red Riders demo tapes, commissioned by their label Ivy League Records.

The band supported Perth band Little Birdy on their national album tour in September 2010.

In accordance with the album's release, two music videos for the songs "Ordinary" and "You've Got a Lotta Nerve" were released. The final single from the album was "Feels Like Grace", although no music video was created for it.

After completing the Drown in Colour tour in early 2010, the band took time off, with Brad Heald rejoining The Vines for numerous shows. As of July 2010, the band had completed demos for their third studio album, with a single out in the later half of 2010. Red Riders posted this message on their website on 18 June 2010:

"Red Riders are currently being little demo bugs and demoing new tracks for the 3rd album! If we could transport you some of the songs with our mind to your ears we would, but then there would be no surprise would there?"

In April 2011, it was announced that the band would be splitting up following two final shows in Melbourne and Sydney. Deutsch rejoined the band for these shows, with songs performed by all five members on stage. Grigg and Wallace would go on to form the garage rock band Palms; while Heald went on to play with groups such as Dune Rats, The Walking Who and Dope Lemon. Chapman would relocate to London, while Deutsch would pursue solo work.

In 2017, Red Riders were announced as the headlining act for the Red Bull Sound Select show taking place at Sydney's Red Rattler theatre in late March. The band – which included all five previous members – would go on to play three more shows in support of Dappled Cities in Brisbane, Melbourne and Sydney. The final show took place on 4 June 2017 at the City Recital Hall in Sydney.

In February 2021, the original lineup of the band reunited for the Sounds of Sydney reopening gala at the Enmore Theatre. The band performed "Ordinary" and a cover of The Go-Betweens' "Darlinghurst Nights."

== Members ==
- Alexander Grigg – lead vocals, rhythm guitar (2003–2011, 2017, 2021)
- Mathew Chapman – bass guitar, backing vocals (2003–2011, 2017, 2021)
- Thomas Wallace – drums, backing vocals (2003–2011, 2017, 2021)
- Adrian Deutsch – lead guitar, lead vocals (2003–2008, 2011, 2017, 2021)
- Brad Heald – lead guitar (2008–2011, 2017)

== Performances ==
=== Festivals ===
- Solar Festival – Victoria 2010
- Pyramid Rock Festival – Victoria 2009
- Festival of the Sun – Port Macquarie 2009
- A Day in the Park – Sydney 2009
- Homebake – Sydney 2006 & 2009
- Big Day Out – Sydney Only 2006 & 2007
- Pauhaus Festival – Brisbane 2007
- Come Together Music Festival – Sydney 2005 & 2006

=== National tours ===
- Slide in Next To Me National Tour – October 2006
- Replica Replica National Tour – February/March 2007
- Break Your Necks National Tour w/ Dappled Cities Fly – June 2007
- You've Got A lot of Nerve Tour – October–November 2008
- Drown in Colour Tour- August–September 2009

== Discography ==
=== Albums ===
List of albums, with selected details and chart positions
Title	Details	Peak chart positions
Title	Details	AUS
Replica Replica	Released: 21 October 2006; Label: Ivy League	—
Drown in Colour	Released: 10 July 2009; Label: Ivy League	59

=== Extended plays ===
- Red Riders (1 August 2004)
- The Plan A (26 September 2005)

=== Singles ===
List of singles, with selected chart positions
Title	Year	Peak chart positions
Title	Year	AUS
"Slide in Next to Me"	2006	63
"November Rain" (with Dappled Cities)	2007	—
