= Swimming in Jeans =

Studio album by Jack Gray (musician)
- Released: 11 September 2026
- Length: 34:50
- Labels: Island; UMA

Jack Gray (musician) chronology
If U Were Mine (2024)	Swimming in Jeans (2026)

Singles from Swimming in Jeans
- 1. "Dumb Sh*t" Released: 16 July 2025; 2. "Drive Her Home" Released: 10 October 2025; 3. "Bluffin'" Released: 5 December 2025; 4. "Tattoos" Released: 13 February 2026; 5. "Look at You" Released: 1 May 2026; 6. "Swimming in Jeans" Released: 3 July 2026; 7. "Safe Space" Released: 14 August 2026

Swimming in Jeans is the debut studio album by the Australian singer and songwriter Jack Gray. The album was announced in April 2026, released on 11 September 2026 and debuted at number 7 on the ARIA Charts.

Upon announcement Gray said the tracks on the album were written over three years and recorded over one, saying, "With this record, I just wanted to put the blinders on and trust my gut."

== Reception ==
Sarah Duggan from The Music said "Across 12 tracks, Gray moves comfortably between glossy, infectious pop and some more stripped-back acoustic moments, building a record that feels personal without ever becoming too precious."

Sophie Graham from Music and Gigs gave it 4/5 saying "Some tracks could be seen as playing it a bit safe on the composition side, sticking to familiar shapes rather than taking big swings. But for a debut he wrote, played and largely produced himself, what more do you want? This really is a great drop, and we can't wait to hear what's coming next."

== Track listing ==
Swimming in Jeans track listing
No.	Title	Writer(s)	Length
1.	"The Deep End"	Jack Gray; Bill Spaeder	1:55
2.	"Dumb Sh*t"	Gray; Jon Hume; Jillian Spaeder	3:03
3.	"Blind Lovin'"	Gray; Gabe Yaron	2:57
4.	"Swimming in Jeans"	Gray	2:56
5.	"Bedroom Floor"	Gray; J. Spaeder	2:29
6.	"Drive Her Home"	Gray; J. Spaeder; Grace Wethor	3:33
7.	"Bluffin'"	Gray; J. Spaeder	2:19
8.	"Tattoos"	Gray; Stuart Kruger; Peach PRC	2:55
9.	"Look at You"	Gray	2:34
10.	"In the Picture"	Gray; Charlie Collins; Cyrus Villanueva	3:34
11.	"Teen Jesus"	Gray; Jarvis Conley; Amanda Mickwee	3:11
12.	"Safe Space"	Gray; Ned Houston; Eric Leva; Hayley Warner	3:20
Total length:			34:50

== Charts ==
Chart (2026)	Peak position
Australian Albums (ARIA)	7
