= Hurry Up and Wait (Dune Rats album) =

Studio album by Dune Rats
- Released: 31 January 2020
- Length: 28:00
- Label: Ratbag; BMG

Dune Rats chronology
The Kids Will Know It's Bullshit (2017)	Hurry Up and Wait (2020)	Real Rare Whale (2022)

Singles from Hurry Up and Wait
- 1. "No Plans" Released: 7 June 2019; 2. "Rubber Arm" Released: 16 August 2019; 3. "Crazy" Released: 8 November 2019; 4. "Stupid Is as Stupid Does" Released: 31 January 2020; 5. "Bad Habits" Released: 7 April 2020

Hurry Up and Wait is the third studio album by Australian rock band Dune Rats. It was released on 31 January 2020. The album was supported with an Australian tour between February and March 2020.

Lead singer Danny Beus said "We didn't set out to make a big album, or a polished album, or an album about partying because the last one did alright, or an album not about partying because we want to get away from that. It's just writing about different stuff in our lives. It was always just going to be Dunies."

== Track listing ==
Hurry Up and Wait track listing
No.	Title	Length
1.	"Intro"	0:48
2.	"Bobby D"	1:23
3.	"Rubber Arm"	2:51
4.	"No Plans"	3:21
5.	"Rock Bottom"	3:07
6.	"Crazy"	2:42
7.	"Patience"	2:09
8.	"Bad Habits"	3:05
9.	"Stupid Is as Stupid Does" (featuring K. Flay)	3:00
10.	"If My Bong Could Talk"	1:38
11.	"The Skids"	2:55
12.	"Mountains Come and Go But Aussie Pub Rock Lives On (Forever)"	1:42
Total length:		28:00

== Charts ==
Sales chart performance for Hurry Up and Wait
Chart (2020)	Peak position
Australian Albums (ARIA)	1

== See also ==
- List of 2020 albums
