= The Kids Will Know It's Bullshit =

Studio album by Dune Rats
- Released: 20 January 2017
- Recorded: 2016
- Studios: Head Gap Studios, Melbourne
- Genres: Pop punk, Surf Rock
- Length: 30:37
- Labels: Ratbag; Dine Alone
- Producers: Zac Carper; Dune Rats

Dune Rats chronology
Dune Rats (2014)	The Kids Will Know It's Bullshit (2017)	Hurry Up and Wait (2020)

Singles from The Kids Will Know It's Bullshit
- 1. "Bullshit" Released: 6 May 2016; 2. "Scott Green" Released: 25 November 2016; 3. "Braindead" Released: April 2017; 4. "6 Pack" Released: July 2017; 5. "Demolition Derby" Released: September 2017

The Kids Will Know It's Bullshit is the second studio album by Australian rock band Dune Rats. It was released on 20 January 2017 by Ratbag Records and Dine Alone Records. It was produced by Zac Carper of American punk band FIDLAR. It debuted at number one on the ARIA Albums Chart in February 2017, which was achieved after heavy touring across Australia, including at the Laneway Festival.

The album was preceded by the release of the songs "Bullshit" and "Scott Green" in 2016, which were voted into the Triple J Hottest 100, 2016 at 33 and 34, respectively. In 2017, the songs Braindead and 6 Pack were voted into the Triple J Hottest 100, 2017 at 75 and 55 respectively. An interactive music video was also made for "Scott Green".

The title came from Courtney Taylor-Taylor, frontman of The Dandy Warhols, who told Dune Rats after the two bands played together in the United States: "Y'know, you've gotta write your own record ... or the kids will know it's bullshit."

== Production and recording ==
The album was produced by Zac Carper of FIDLAR, who Dune Rats chose after touring with the band. Dune Rats had to convince their label that Carper was an appropriate choice, as the label believed that it would be a waste of money and no work would be done. The band would later call Carper the "fourth official member". Danny Beusa said: "We just wanted to make sort of stoner pop music. Zac would just push me, because I would come up with something we'd want to write, and I'd do a draft of all the lyrics, and then we'd go through my lyrics and pick out lines that the guys would feel like aren't really that sick and then I'd sort of throw around different lines and it was kind of communal."

"Scott Green" was the only track not written in Australia; it was penned while the band were in Joshua Tree, California. The rest of the record was written at "various beach shacks across the east coast" of Australia over three years, and recorded at Head Gap Studios in Melbourne.

== Critical reception ==
Professional ratings
Review scores
Source	Rating
News.com.au	3/5 stars
Rolling Stone Australia	3.5/5 stars

Mikey Cahill of News.com.au awarded the album three out of five stars and called it "a notable step up from their self-titled debut album", writing that the band "blend pop melodies with scuzzy guitars and stick-it-to-the-man platitudes. It's a shedload of fun." Cahill believed the album would help gain Dune Rats more fans, and concluded: "Fingers crossed they all make it to 40 and three more records." Matt Coyte of Rolling Stone Australia gave the album three-and-a-half stars out of five and complimented the band's "Aussie irreverence". Coyte contrasted the album with their debut, saying that record's "playfulness has been mostly replaced with rebellion so nihilistic that it seems irresponsible." Coyte also called it a "fun record, but in the same way that drinking till you throw up is fun."

== Track listing ==
No.	Title	Length
1.	"Don't Talk"	2:43
2.	"6 Pack"	2:56
3.	"Demolition Derby"	2:56
4.	"Braindead"	3:02
5.	"Scott Green"	2:10
6.	"Never Gonna Get High"	3:11
7.	"Like Before"	2:58
8.	"Counting Sheep"	2:35
9.	"Buzz-Kill"	2:11
10.	"Mary"	2:55
11.	"Bullshit"	3:00
Total length:		30:37

== Personnel ==
Dune Rats

- BC Michaels – performance, production
- Danny Beus – performance, production
- Brett Jansch – performance, production

Additional contributors

- Zac Carper – production
- Don Bartley – mastering
- Doug Boehm – mixing
- Rohan Sforcina – engineering
- Lee McConnell – art

== Charts ==
Chart (2017)	Peak position
Australian Albums (ARIA)	1
