= Golden Wolf =

Studio album by Dope Lemon
- Released: 2 May 2025
- Length: 44:11
- Label: BMG

Dope Lemon chronology
Kimosabè (2023)	Golden Wolf (2025)

Golden Wolf is the seventh studio album by Australian musician Angus Stone, and his fifth under the name Dope Lemon. It was announced on 6 February 2025 alongside its second single "Electric Green Lambo" and released on 2 May 2025 through BMG Rights Management.

Within a statement released at time of announcement it read "Moving effortlessly between sun-soaked rock and shimmering nocturnal grooves, the album invites listeners to savour the journey rather than rush to the destination. Like a vast desert landscape, the album is both stark and stunning — a place where time slows, and you can lose yourself completely."

At the 2025 ARIA Music Awards, the album was nominated for ARIA Award for Best Blues and Roots Album,

At the AIR Awards of 2026, Angus Stone was nominated for Independent Producer of the Year for their work on this album.

== Track listing ==
Golden Wolf track listing
No.	Title	Writer(s)	Length
1.	"John Belushi"	Angus Stone; Elliott Hammond; Brad Heald	5:35
2.	"Sugarcat"	Stone; Ben Edgar	2:54
3.	"Electric Green Lambo"	Stone; Edgar	2:35
4.	"Golden Wolf"	Stone; Edgar	3:39
5.	"Yamasuki – Yama Yama"	Stone	4:10
6.	"We Solid Gold"	Stone; Edgar	3:35
7.	"She's All Time" (featuring Nina Nesbitt)	Stone; Hammond	3:14
8.	"Maggie's Moonshine"	Stone; Heald	7:24
9.	"On the 45"	Stone; Heald	3:14
10.	"Dust of a Thousand Stars"	Stone; Hammond; Heald	7:47
Total length:			44:11

== Personnel ==
Credits adapted from Tidal.

- Dope Lemon – lead vocals, mixing (all tracks); backing vocals (tracks 1–9); bass, synthesizer (5)
- Eric J Dubowsky – mixing
- Brian Lucey – engineering
- Paul Pilseniks – engineering
- Benny Edgar – electric guitar (tracks 1–7, 9), acoustic guitar (1, 6); bass, drums, percussion, synthesizer (2–4, 6); harp, theremin (2, 3); piano (4); autoharp, guitar, Moog, slide guitar (9)
- Thomas Bartlett – synthesizer (tracks 1–7, 9), piano (1–3, 5, 9), electric piano (2, 3, 6); clavinet, Mellotron (6)
- Elliott Hammond – drums, percussion (tracks 1, 7, 10); congas, piano (1); electric guitar (7, 10); additional vocals, bass, Farfisa organ, Rhodes piano, slide guitar (7); backing vocals, electric piano (10)
- Brad Heald – acoustic guitar, bass, electric guitar (tracks 1, 8, 9); synthesizer (1, 8, 10), drum programming (8–10), percussion (8, 9), backing vocals (8, 10); additional vocals, guitar, organ, piano (8); banjo, drums, slide guitar (9); Hammond B3 organ, sitar, theremin (10)
- Nina Nesbitt – backing vocals (track 1), featured vocals (7)
- Martha Baartz – alto saxophone, tenor saxophone (track 8)

== Charts ==
Weekly chart performance for Golden Wolf
Chart (2025)	Peak position
Australian Albums (ARIA)	8
Belgian Albums (Ultratop Flanders)	163
French Rock & Metal Albums (SNEP)	28
German Albums (Offizielle Top 100)	46
New Zealand Albums (RMNZ)	32
Scottish Albums (OCC)	92
Swiss Albums (Schweizer Hitparade)	78

Year-end chart performance for Golden Wolf
Chart (2025)	Position
Australian Artist Albums (ARIA)	45
