= Real Rare Whale =

Studio album by Dune Rats
- Released: 29 July 2022
- Length: 28:34
- Label: Dune Rate; BMG

Dune Rats chronology
Hurry Up and Wait (2020)	Real Rare Whale (2022)	If It Sucks, Turn It Up (2024)

Singles from Real Rare Whale
- 1. "Up" Released: 4 November 2021; 2. "What a Memorable Night" Released: 11 February 2022; 3. "Melted Into Two" Released: 16 May 2022; 4. "Pamela Aniston" Released: 29 July 2022

Real Rare Whale is the fourth studio album by Australian rock band Dune Rats. It was released on 29 July 2022 and peaked at number 6 on the ARIA Charts.

The band said, "Real Rare Whale is hands down the fastest, funnest and most insane album we've ever recorded. It's an album that expresses the love of music and writing songs. Songs that will be epic to play live to thousands of sweaty bodies having a great time."

At the 2022 ARIA Music Awards, the album was nominated for Best Hard Rock or Heavy Metal Album.

== Reception ==
Professional ratings
Review scores
Source	Rating
Kerrang!	4/5
Rolling Stone Australia	4/5 stars

Jessica Lynch from Rolling Stone Australia said "Dune Rats' latest tunes serve as the perfect positive antidote to pandemic-induced negativity. In what feels like their fastest, funnest and punniest Dune Rats album yet, the slew of party-starting bangers, including single 'What a Memorable Night', are clear dancefloor-fillers."

Rachel Roberts from Kerrang said "Real Rare Whale is jam packed with nonsensical and fast tempo surf shack anthems". Roberts concluded saying, "By the time the record comes to a close with 'If This Is The End' it almost feels as though you're returning from a day of partying on the beach after drunkenly giggling with friends – your skin is sunkissed, your hair salty from the ocean's waves and your head is full of a euphoric, smile-induced headache. It's brilliant fun."

== Track listing ==
Real Rare Whale track listing
No.	Title	Length
1.	"LTD"	2:33
2.	"Dumb TV"	1:55
3.	"Up"	3:23
4.	"Pamela Aniston"	3:12
5.	"What A Memorable Night"	2:53
6.	"Skate Or Don't"	2:48
7.	"Space Cadet"	2:52
8.	"Melted Into Two"	3:07
9.	"Drink All Day"	3:42
10.	"If This Is The End"	2:09
Total length:		28:34

== Charts ==
Chart performance for Real Rare Whale
Chart (2022)	Peak position
Australian Albums (ARIA)	6
