= Rose Pink Cadillac =

Studio album by Dope Lemon
- Released: 7 January 2022
- Length: 53:17
- Label: BMG Rights Management

Dope Lemon chronology
Smooth Big Cat (2019)	Rose Pink Cadillac (2022)	Kimosabè (2023)

Rose Pink Cadillac is the fifth studio album by Australian musician Angus Stone; third under the name Dope Lemon and was released on 7 January 2022.

At the AIR Awards of 2023, the album won Best Independent Blues and Roots Album or EP.

== Background and release ==
In September 2021, Stone announced the release of Rose Pink Cadillac, originally scheduled for release on 12 November 2021, proceeded by the single, "Every Day Is a Holiday", "Kids Fallin' in Love" and Rose Pink Cadillac". The album is split into two, with the first half representing the "daytime Dope Lemon experience", while the latter half takes a darker turn into "the nighttime world of the lemon".

Upon announcement of the album's release, Stone said, "This new Dope Lemon record Rose Pink Cadillac has been an epic frontier to have embarked on. The making of this creation took months of many tireless long nights... plus many bottles of delicious whiskey and treats. Each time the writing of a new album takes a new chapter out of my life and freezes it in time. The days and months poured into making this record disappear in the blink of an eye; it's a mix of hard work and pure joy."

Fan who preordered the album went into a draw to win a restored rose pink 1960 Cadillac Fleetwood.

In November 2021, the album was delayed until 7 January 2022. Stone said "I'd like to say this is my love album. For the times we were in, the struggles that people are going through at the moment, I think it's a better time than any to share love and this record is a thing of love."

== Reception ==
Guy Oddy from The Arts Desk wrote "Spaced-out vocals and lo-fi production entwined with mellow, soulful grooves that are woozy and mellow predominate for much of Rose Pink Cadillac", adding "It's a perfect album for chilling out with the one you love and dreaming about hot summery days spent relaxing in the sunshine".

== Track listing ==
Rose Pink Cadillac track listing
No.	Title	Length
1.	"Rose Pink Cadillac"	4:21
2.	"Kids Fallin' in Love"	3:47
3.	"Howl with Me"	4:19
4.	"Stingray Pete"	4:25
5.	"Sailors Delight"	6:27
6.	"Everyday Is a Holiday" (with Winston Surfshirt)	5:53
7.	"Lovesick Brain"	4:50
8.	"High Rollin'" (featuring Louise Verneuil)	5:58
9.	"Gods Machete"	6:41
10.	"Shadows in the Moonlight"	6:36
Total length:		53:17

== Charts ==
Chart performance for Rose Pink Cadillac
Chart (2022)	Peak position
Australian Albums (ARIA)	2
German Albums (Offizielle Top 100)	27
Swiss Albums (Schweizer Hitparade)	33
