= Jack Gray (musician) =

Australian singer and songwriter

- Born: Jack Richard Gray; Mackay, Australia
- Occupations: Singer; songwriter; producer
- Website: jackgrayofficial.com

Jack Gray is an Australian born, Los Angeles based singer and songwriter. Gray's debut studio album Swimming in Jeans was released on 11 September 2026.

== Early life and education ==
Gray was raised in Mackay, North Queensland, Australia.

He grew up in a musical family; his dad was a drummer, his grandmother was a pianist and his my uncle was a bass player. He relocated to Brisbane to study Bachelor of Music then moved to Sydney and signed a development deal with Warner Brothers. He left University after 6 months.

== Career ==
In 2018 Gray supported Dean Lewis on his tour of the United Kingdom and Europe.

In 2019, Gray released his debut EP Nights Like This.

In 2020, Gray released "I Got 3" in June, followed by "That Guy" in September.

In August 2021, Gray confirmed his 12-track debut studio album was "nearly finished".

In July 2022, Jack Gray supported Tate McRae on her Australia and New Zealand tour.

In 2025, it was announced that Gray had signed with Island Records. In July 2025, he released "Dumb Sh*t", the first on that label.

== Discography ==
=== Albums ===
List of albums, with selected details
Title	Details	Peak chart positions
Title	Details	AUS
Swimming in Jeans	Released: 11 September 2026; Label: Island, Universal Music	7

=== Extended plays ===
List of EPs, with selected details
Title	Details
Nights Like This	Released: May 2019; Label: Warner Music Australia
Future Echo	Released: May 2023; Label: Warner Music Australia
If U Were Mine	Released: August 2024; Label: Juno Moon
