= Angus Stone =

Australian singer-songwriter (born 1986)

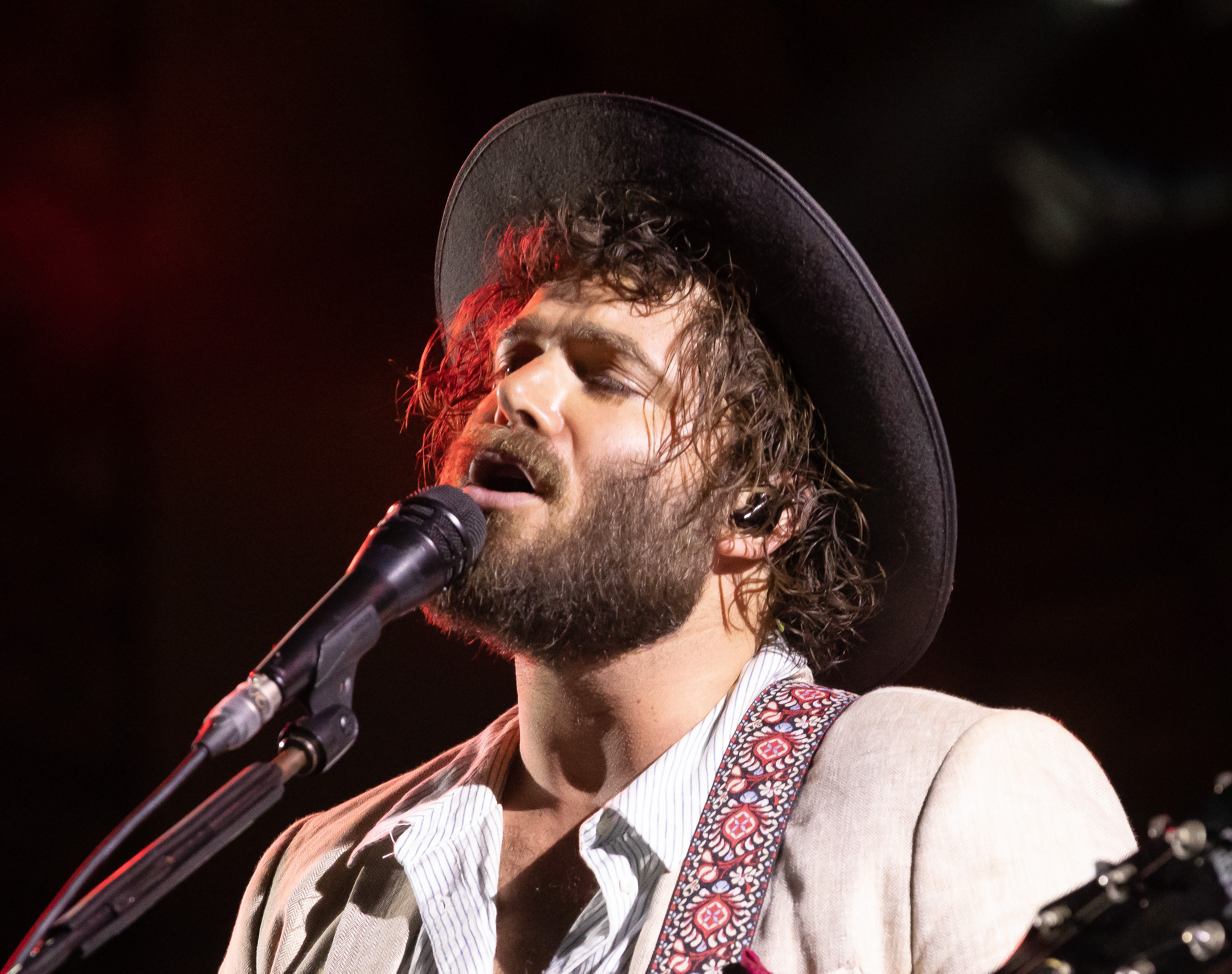
- Stone performing in 2018

Background information
- Also known as: Lady of the Sunshine; Dope Lemon
- Born: Angus John Stone; 27 April 1986 (age 40); Sydney, Australia
- Genres: Folk; acoustic; rock; soul
- Occupation: Singer-songwriter
- Instruments: Vocals; guitar; mandolin; banjo; piano
- Years active: 2005–present
- Labels: EMI Australia; Flock; PIAS; Nettwerk; Discograph
- Member of: Angus & Julia Stone
- Website: angusstone.com

Angus John Stone (born 27 April 1986) is an Australian singer-songwriter. He is one half of the musical sibling duo Angus & Julia Stone, with whom he has released five studio albums. His debut solo album, Smoking Gun, was released in April 2009 under the pseudonym Lady of the Sunshine, and reached the top 50 on the ARIA Albums Chart. His second solo album, Broken Brights, was released under his name on 13 July 2012 and peaked at number 2. Stone currently records under the moniker of Dope Lemon.

== Biography ==
Angus Stone was born on 27 April 1986 and grew up in Sydney. His parents, John and Kim Stone, were both folk musicians. Stone's older sisters are Catherine (born ca. 1982) and Julia Stone (born 13 April 1984). Stone attended Newport Primary School and Barrenjoey High School. At primary school he joined the school band with his father teaching and his sisters accompanying. At family gatherings when the children performed, Stone played trombone, Catherine on saxophone and Julia on trumpet with Kim singing and John on keyboard or guitar. At about the age of 14 years his parents separated and soon after he started writing pop songs. Stone joined a band in high school as lead singer playing both covers and original songs. The band performed at numerous local community events.

While on a holiday with his sister to South America, Stone showcased his musical side to Julia, "[Angus] was writing amazing songs ... [he] had shown me how to play guitar in Bolivia, and those songs had gotten me through that year". By 2005 Stone was playing at open mic nights, sometimes Julia performed backing vocals – their first such gig, at the Coogee Bay Hotel, they performed "Tears". After playing split sets with each singing backing vocals to the other's material, in 2006, they formed a duo, Angus & Julia Stone. In March that year the pair recorded their debut extended play, Chocolates and Cigarettes, which was released in August. Since then the group has released two EPs, two compilation albums and five studio albums.

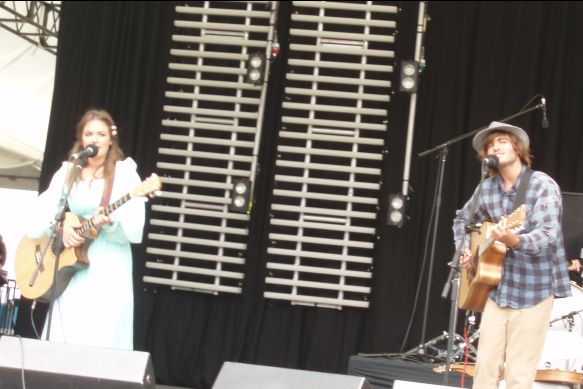
Angus & Julia Stone (Angus at right) performing at Falls Festival, Marion Bay, Tasmania, December 2007.

While Angus and his older sister, Julia, have always clearly communicated to the public that they are siblings, fans admitted to mistaking the pair for a married couple.

=== 2009–2011: Lady of the Sunshine: Smoking Gun ===
In April 2009, after touring for over a year in support of the duo's first studio album, A Book Like This (September 2007), Stone released his debut solo album, Smoking Gun, under the pseudonym, Lady of the Sunshine. It was recorded over six weeks during 2008 with Finn (Govinda Doyle) – who also played drums and bass guitar – in a converted old water tank on Finn's property in North Queensland. In an interview on national radio station, Triple J, with Richard Kingsmill, Stone said that the album came out of "growing an appetite for wanting to rock out". Stone explained that he had played in rock bands while in high school, they covered material by Rage Against the Machine and Red Hot Chili Peppers – these influences are loosely present on Smoking Gun. To accompany the album Stone wrote "Every emotion in my head has its own voice and this record is what came of them .... I wanted these songs to have their own style. I enjoyed watching how the songs took on their own ride, most from the simplest of ideas". The album reached the top 50 on the ARIA Albums Chart. One of his tracks, "Big Jet Plane", from Smoking Gun was later re-recorded by Angus & Julia Stone and released by the duo as a single in May 2010.

In March 2010 the duo's second album, Down the Way, debuted at No. 1. By 2011 it was certified 3× platinum by ARIA. It was the highest-selling album by an Australian artist in 2010. Down the Way peaked in the top 30 on the French Albums Chart and stayed in the top 200 for 86 weeks. At the ARIA Music Awards of 2010 the duo won 'Album of the Year' for Down the Way and 'Single of the Year' for "Big Jet Plane". Their single "Big Jet Plane" was voted No. 1 in the Triple J Hottest 100 in 2011. After a world tour promoting Down the Way, Stone and his sister parted ways, according to Stone with a "tip of the hat and strolled in different directions". In a Rolling Stone (Australia) interview, Julia revealed the duo had started recording tracks for a third album, in January 2011, but shelved them indefinitely: "It was too much to think we could only pick six songs each… We were both in a place where we really wanted creative space to go in whatever direction we wanted so we were like 'let’s just take a year out'". She elaborated that those songs were unlikely to be heard, but maintained the pair would reunite after their solo projects.

=== 2012–2015: Broken Brights ===
Stone performing in 2012

In late 2011 Stone began working on his second solo album, Broken Brights. He told Surfing World Magazine, "[r]ecording with Julia is cool but we both have our hands on the wheel. This was an opportunity to grab the wheel and do some burn-outs". It was released in Australia on 13 July 2012 which peaked at No. 2. The title track from the album was released as the lead single in March that year as a free download on Triple J's Home and Hosed. The second single, "Bird on the Buffalo", is a metaphor for a musing relationship between lovers. and the video features the actress Isabel Lucas. According to Indie London's Jack Foley, the third single, "Wooden Chair" is "mesmerising in a low-key, effortlessly brilliant manner that also manages to include an intoxicating background whistle. It’s breezy and romantic without really even trying to be". It was featured in the US TV show, Private Practice, in Season 6, Episode 3 "Good Grief". The fourth single, "Monsters", had its video premiered on The Huffington Post. The album was certified gold by ARIA for shipment of 35,000 copies.

The album was built upon childhood influences such as Bob Dylan and The Eagles, the end result being very Dylanesque, laid-back with some rockier elements. When speaking to the Vancouver Weekly about the creation of Broken Brights he said he "discovered a lot about time". Further elaborating, he said, "Just in general. To take a step back and let something unfold and breathe and become ripe when it says it's time".

Broken Brights was released in Australia on 13 July. The album was released on Nettwerk Records, in the US, EMI in Australia and UK, and Discograph in France. Foley lauded the release as "[n]othing short of stunning ... his most personal work to date ... demonstrates his versatility. It’s steeped in classic song-writing values, sound-checking without directly referencing the likes of the great American song-writers, from Petty to Dylan via Neil Young". Jen Wilson reviewed Broken Brights for Beat Magazine saying, "within minutes you’re transported to another time ... Stone appears as a chameleon storyteller throughout Broken Brights, adapting with each theme and musical genre". Tony Hardy from Consequence of Sound said "There’s always something unexpected around the corner". Triple J made Broken Brights their Album of the Week upon its release, and described it as "a dreamy, chilled, nostalgic record which shows off Angus' unique songwriting".

The "Monsters" single was released on 26 February 2013 by Nettwerk Productions. It contains an edited version of the song that was previously released on Broken Brights. The song was cut from 5 minutes and 20 seconds to only 4 minutes and 3 seconds. The single also contains a previously unreleased tune titled "In the Glow".

=== 2016–2022: Dope Lemon: Honey Bones, Hounds Tooth and Rose Pink Cadillac ===
In 2016, Stone began recording under the moniker Dope Lemon. The album Honey Bones was recorded with Rohin Brown (of The Walking Who) and Elliot Hammond in Stone's own farm studio. The song "Uptown Folks" was released as the first song from the album in February 2016, with Triple J describing the track as "laidback coastal rock", while "Marinade" was released as a single on the American iTunes Store in May. The album was released on 10 June 2016.

On 27 February 2017, Stone released his second set of studio recordings as Dope Lemon, the four-track EP Hounds Tooth.

Smooth Big Cat Dope Lemon's second studio album was released in July 2019. The album spawned the popular single "Hey You".

In September 2021, Stone announce the release of the third studio album by Dope Lemon, titled Rose Pink Cadillac. The album was preceded by the singles "Every Day Is a Holiday", "Kids Fallin' in Love", "Rose Pink Cadillac" and "Stingray Pete" and was released in January 2022.

=== 2023–Present: Dope Lemon: Kimosabé and Golden Wolf ===
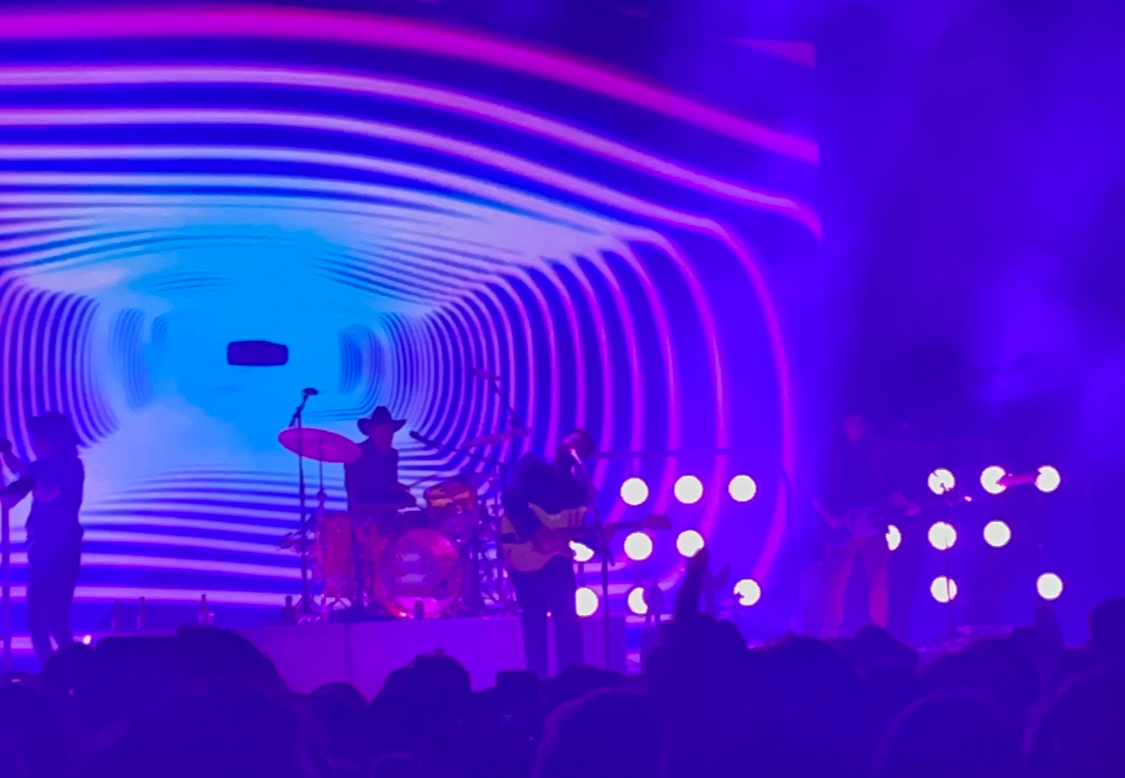
Dope Lemon performing at The Forum in Melbourne 2023

Early 2023 American star Post Malone was opening for the American Band Red Hot Chili Peppers in Melbourne, when Stone was invited on stage. Malone and Stone proceeded to perform "Big Jet Plane" together. This coming a couple months after video of Malone was released, talking about how he could sample the song to American Rapper Swae Lee. A recording of the performance was uploaded onto Malone's YouTube page on May 16. Stone would later open for Malone on his Australia leg of his If Y'all Weren't Here, I'd Be Crying Tour in 2023.

In June 2023, Stone released "Kimosabé", the lead single from the album of the same name; the fourth released under the moniker of Dope Lemon. The song itself features samples from Will Ferrell from the film Step Brothers. Both Ferrell and director Adam McKay have received co-writing credits on the song.

In July 2023 the second single from Dope Lemon's fourth studio album "Miami Baby" was released. An accompanying music video was released which was shot within Australian Rules Footballer Lance Franklin's home.

Kimosabé Dope Lemon's fourth studio album was released in September 2023. The album was the first of Dope Lemon's albums to feature Stone's face on the album cover. The album peaked at number 9 on the ARIA albums chart.

In November 2024, Dope Lemon released "Golden Wolf", described as his "next chapter". In February 2025, Dope Lemon announced the release of Golden Wolf, scheduled for release on 9 May 2025.

== Live performances ==
Angus Stone began to play his new solo music at Splendour in the Grass in Byron Bay in July 2012. In September that year he embarked on a solo tour of the US, UK, continental Europe, and Australia with sold out shows including Brussels, Utrecht, Berlin and both his Los Angeles and New York shows. Upon the start of his solo tour Angus said, "To play live as my own in front of those people, it's going to be a different trail of gravel and gold, but none the less very exciting ... it's a whole different trip". His live performances have garnered praise, The Stanford Daily's Sasha Arijanto reported being "bewitched by the dulcet sounds from the stage". After Stone's show in Montreal, Caitlin Grimes from Confront Magazine stated, "don’t think I can name another artist who can manage to grab you by the wrist and pull you into such stories with him". Stone played his first solo shows in Australia including at Enmore Theatre in Sydney on 1 November. He performed at the Australian summer festivals including Homebake, Woodford, Falls (both Lorne and Marion Bay), and Southbound in Western Australia. In early 2013 he is due to start a European tour including London's Shepherd's Bush Empire.

== Discography ==
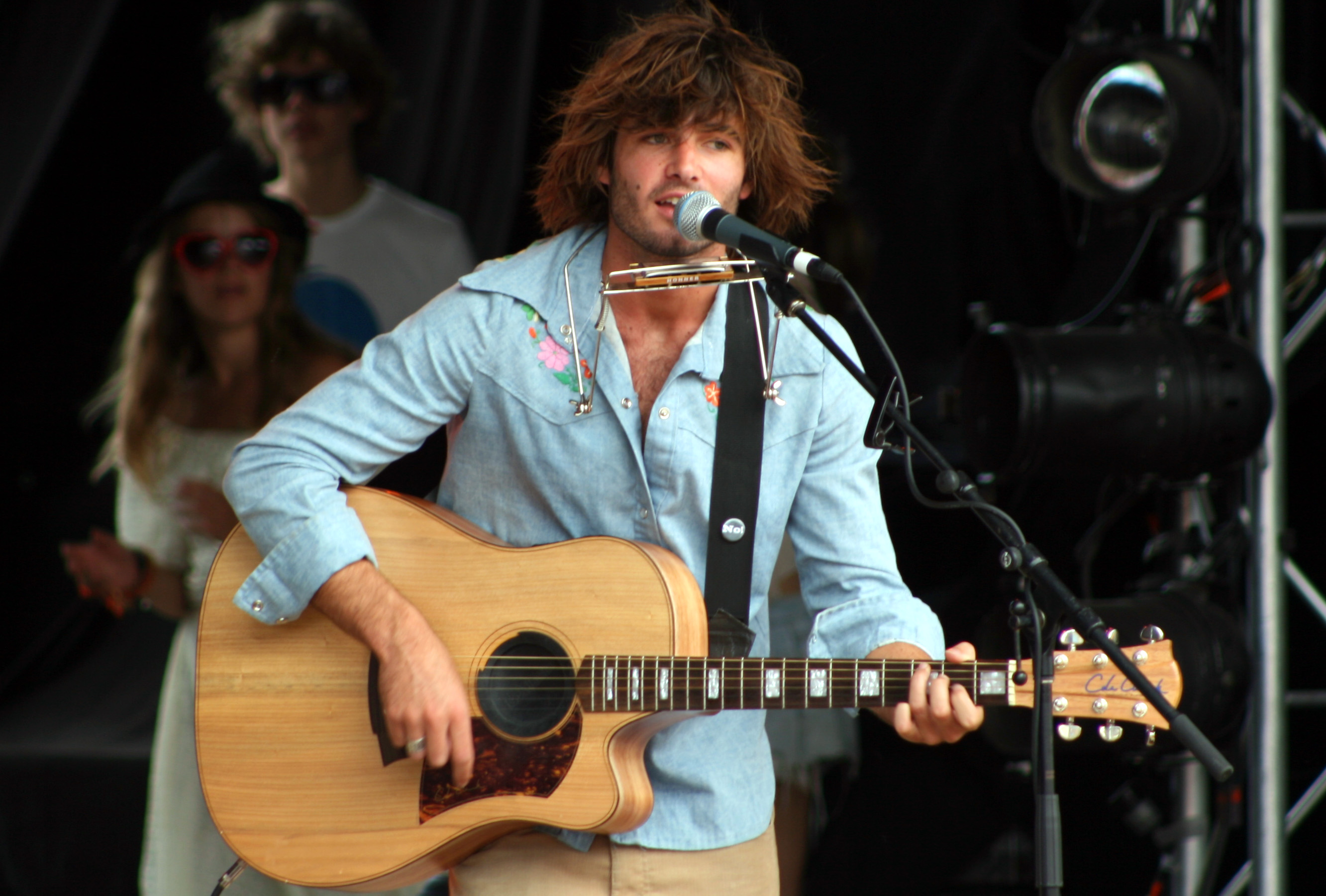
Stone in 2007

- Smoking Gun (2009, as Lady of the Sunshine)
- Broken Brights (2012, as Angus Stone)
- Honey Bones (2016, as Dope Lemon)
- Smooth Big Cat (2019, as Dope Lemon)
- Rose Pink Cadillac (2022, as Dope Lemon)
- Kimosabé (2023, as Dope Lemon)
- Golden Wolf (2025, as Dope Lemon)

== Awards and nominations ==
=== AIR Awards ===
The Australian Independent Record Awards (commonly known informally as AIR Awards) is an annual awards night to recognise, promote and celebrate the success of Australia's Independent Music sector.

Year	Nominee / work	Award	Result	Ref.
2023	Rose Pink Cadillac	Best Independent Blues and Roots Album or EP	Won	
2024	Kimosabé	Best Independent Blues and Roots Album or EP	Nominated	
2026	Angus Stone for Dope Lemon - Golden Wolf	Independent Producer of the Year	Nominated	

=== APRA Awards ===
The APRA Awards are several award ceremonies run in Australia by the Australasian Performing Right Association (APRA) to recognise composing and song writing skills, sales and airplay performance by its members annually.

Year	Nominee / work	Award	Result
2011	Angus & Julia Stone (with Julia Stone)	Songwriter of the Year	Won
2011	"Big Jet Plane" (with Julia Stone)	Song of the Year	Won
2013	"Bird on the Buffalo" (Angus Stone)	Song of the Year	Shortlisted
2015	"Get Home" (with Julia Stone)	Blues & Roots Work of the Year	Nominated
2015	"Heart Beats Slow" (with Julia Stone)	Blues & Roots Work of the Year	Won
2015	"Heart Beats Slow" (with Julia Stone)	Song of the Year	Shortlisted
2018	"Snow" (with Julia Stone)	Song of the Year	Shortlisted
2019	"Chateau" (with Julia Stone)	Blues & Roots Work of the Year	Won
2021	"Give Me Honey" by Dope Lemon (Angus Stone)	Most Performed Blues & Roots Work	Nominated
2024	"Miami Baby" by Dope Lemon (Angus Stone)	Most Performed Alternative Work	Nominated

=== ARIA Music Awards ===
The ARIA Music Awards is an annual ceremony presented by Australian Recording Industry Association (ARIA), which recognise excellence, innovation, and achievement across all genres of the music of Australia. They commenced in 1987.

Year	Nominee / work	Award	Result	Ref.
2008	Angus Stone, Julia Stone and Josh Groom for "Just a Boy"	Best Video	Nominated	
2012	Broken Brights	Best Male Artist	Nominated	
2012	Broken Brights	Best Blues & Roots Album	Nominated	
2024	Kimosabè	Best Blues and Roots Album	Nominated	
2025	Golden Wolf	Best Blues and Roots Album	Nominated	

=== Rolling Stone Australia Awards ===
The Rolling Stone Australia Awards are awarded annually by the Australian edition of Rolling Stone magazine for outstanding contributions to popular culture in the previous year.

Year	Nominee / work	Award	Result	Ref.
2024	Kimosabé	Best Record	Nominated	
