= Smooth Big Cat =

Studio album by Dope Lemon
- Released: 12 July 2019
- Label: BMG Rights Management

Dope Lemon chronology
Honey Bones (2016)	Smooth Big Cat (2019)	Rose Pink Cadillac (2022)

Smooth Big Cat is the fourth studio album by Australian musician Angus Stone; second under the name Dope Lemon and was released on 12 July 2019. The album peaked at number 2 in Australia.

The model pictured on the album cover is Franziska Gurtler.

== Reception ==
Rochelle Bevis from Beat Magazine called it "Dope Lemon's most developed and ethereal sound yet" saying "This enchanting album makes you feel like you're floating after the best road trip of your life."

Taylor Marshall from The Music AU said "This is an album that will have people picking up acoustic guitars for the foreseeable future. It's layered yet simplistic, creating a relaxing vibrancy.

Ben Niesen from Atwood Magazine said "Despite repeating themes and instruments, Smooth Big Cat is like a lava lamp: kitschy and passé, but tantalising and hypnotic."

== Track listing ==
Smooth Big Cat track listing
No.	Title	Length
1.	"Hey You"	4:38
2.	"Salt & Pepper"	5:28
3.	"Hey Little Baby"	5:17
4.	"Lonely Boys Paradise"	5:05
5.	"Give Me Honey"	3:38
6.	"Dope & Smoke"	5:04
7.	"Smooth Big Cat"	4:33
8.	"The Midnight Slow"	3:24
9.	"Mechanical Bull"	3:44
10.	"Hey Man Don't Look at Me Like That"	5:28

== Charts ==
Chart performance for Smooth Big Cat
Chart (2019)	Peak position
Australian Albums (ARIA)	2
German Albums (Offizielle Top 100)	44
Swiss Albums (Schweizer Hitparade)	89
