= Honey Bones =

Studio album by Dope Lemon
- Released: 10 June 2016
- Label: EMI Music Australia

Dope Lemon chronology
Broken Brights (2012)	Honey Bones (2016)	Smooth Big Cat (2019)

Honey Bones is the third studio album by Australian musician Angus Stone; first under the name Dope Lemon and was released in June 2016. The album peaked at number 11 in Australia.

== Reception ==
Charmaine de Souza from The Music said "Honey Bones is an effortlessly cool collection of breezy tunes that's guaranteed to be every triple j fan's wet dream. The stellar combination of dreamy vocals and layered hooks is rough around the edges in all the right ways and works hard at putting its listener in an almost inescapable trance."

Amanda Sherring from Forte Magazine said "This album fine tunes everything [Stone has] done in the past to reach the epitome of what it means to blend fantasy and reality" saying her personal favourite is "Stonecutters" adding "There's psych, tribal, folk and rock all wrapped up into one bundle of daydream-igniting bliss."

== Track listing ==
No.	Title	Length
1.	"Marinade"	3:57
2.	"Uptown Folks"	4:48
3.	"Fuck Things Up"	4:31
4.	"Coyote"	3:49
5.	"How Many Times"	4:45
6.	"Stonecutters"	4:30
7.	"Honey Bones"	5:25
8.	"The Way You Do"	3:07
9.	"Won't Let You Go"	3:57
10.	"Best Girl"	6:37

== Charts ==
Chart performance for Honey Bones
Chart (2016)	Peak position
Australian Albums (ARIA)	11
German Albums (Offizielle Top 100)	74
