= If It Sucks, Turn It Up =

Studio album by Dune Rats
- Released: 2 August 2024
- Studio: The Grove
- Length: 29:01
- Label: Dune Rats; BMG
- Producer: Dune Rats; Scott Horscroft

Dune Rats chronology
| Real Rare Whale (2022) | If It Sucks, Turn It Up (2024) |

Singles from If It Sucks, Turn It Up
- 1. "Be Like You" Released: 17 November 2023; 2. "Solar Eyes" Released: 15 March 2024; 3. "Cheapskate" Released: 24 May 2024; 4. "If It Sucks, Turn It Up" Released: 2 August 2024

If It Sucks, Turn It Up is the fifth studio album by Australian rock band Dune Rats. It was released on 2 August 2024.

Guitarist Danny Beus said: "We wanted to make an album that throws you around a bit, like you are being washed around in the surf. We're five albums in now so we knew it should be a record that shows all the different sides to the band."

At the 2024 ARIA Music Awards, the album was nominated for Best Hard Rock/Heavy Metal Album.

At the AIR Awards of 2025, the album was nominated for Best Independent Punk Album or EP.

== Reception ==
Professional ratings
Review scores
| Source | Rating |
|---|---|
| Clash | 9/10 |
| Kerrang! | 4/5 |

Emma Wilkes from Kerrang! wrote that "Contrary to Dune Rats' self-deprecating quip, this record doesn’t suck at all."

Jack White from Clash said "Over the piece, this album is fantastic and you can easily compare this album to releases from the successful groups around the 1990s/2000s in this genre... Dune Rats definitely have carved out their own identity whilst remaining faithful to the pop/punk energy, and they keep the appeal of this style feeling fresh." Matt Slocum from Rolling Stone Australia called the album "a left-step".

Gary from Devolution Magazine said "Throughout the band's fifth full-length there is a youthful verve that harks back to those early Blink-182 or Green Day records, with plenty of humour, self-awareness and bouncing riffs."

== Track listing ==
All tracks are written by Dune Rats; "If It Sucks, Turn It Up" written with Drew Fulk; "Beers, Bongs & Bullshit" written with Wes Thomas.

If It Sucks, Turn It Up track listing
| No. | Title | Length |
|---|---|---|
| 1. | "'If It Sucks, Turn It Up" | 2:59 |
| 2. | "Be Like You" | 2:53 |
| 3. | "Solar Eyes" | 3:33 |
| 4. | "Cheapskate" | 3:11 |
| 5. | "Main Beach" | 3:06 |
| 6. | "High Roller Selling Dope" | 2:19 |
| 7. | "Paper Cuts" | 2:47 |
| 8. | "Rick Kid Rehab" | 2:27 |
| 9. | "Time Bomb" | 2:18 |
| 10. | "Beers, Bongs & Bullshit" | 3:22 |
| Total length: | | 29:01 |

== Personnel ==
Dune Rats

- Danny Beus – vocals, guitar, production
- BC Michaels – drums, production
- Brett Jansch – bass, production

Additional contributors

- Scott Horscroft – production, mixing, engineering
- Mike Tucci – mastering
- Jase Harper – art

== Charts ==
Chart performance for If It Sucks, Turn It Up
| Chart (2024) | Peak position |
|---|---|
| Australian Albums (ARIA) | 29 |
