= Smoking Gun (album) =

Studio album by Lady of the Sunshine
- Released: 27 March 2009
- Genre: Pop
- Length: 50:48
- Labels: Desert Harvest Records, EMI Music Australia

Lady of the Sunshine chronology
Smoking Gun (2009)	Broken Brights (2012)

Smoking Gun is the debut studio album by Australian musician Angus Stone, released in March 2009 under the name Lady of the Sunshine. It peaked at number 45 in Australia.

== Background and release ==
The album was recorded over six weeks during 2008 with Finn (Govinda Doyle) – who also provided drums and bass guitar – in a converted old water tank on Finn's property in North Queensland. Stone said the album came out of "growing an appetite for wanting to rock out". Stone explained that he had played in rock bands while in high school, covering material by Rage Against the Machine and Red Hot Chili Peppers – these influences are loosely present on Smoking Gun. To accompany the album Stone wrote "Every emotion in my head has its own voice and this record is what came of them .... I wanted these songs to have their own style. I enjoyed watching how the songs took on their own ride, most from the simplest of ideas". The album reached the top 50 on the ARIA Albums Chart. One of his tracks, "Big Jet Plane", from Smoking Gun was later re-recorded by Angus & Julia Stone and released by the duo as a single in May 2010.

== Track listing ==
No.	Title	Length
1.	"Silver Revolver"	4:21
2.	"Home Sweet Home"	4:15
3.	"White Rose Parade"	3:56
4.	"Jack Nimble"	4:53
5.	"Big Jet Plane"	3:57
6.	"Smoking Gun"	3:34
7.	"Daisychain"	3:45
8.	"The Wolf"	4:31
9.	"Anna"	3:22
10.	"Kings Black Magic"	4:24
11.	"Dead Man’s Train"	4:31
12.	"Lady Sunshine"	6:19
Total length:		50:48

== Charts ==
Chart (2009)	Peak position
Australian Albums (ARIA)	45
