= Sloan Peterson =

Australian singer/songwriter

- Born: 1994 (age 30–31)
- Origin: Los Angeles California
- Genres: Alternative, Indie Rock, Pop
- Occupations: Singer; record producer
- Instrument: Vocals, Guitar, Piano
- Years active: 2017–present
- Labels: Warner Music Australia
- Website: www.sloanpeterson.com.au

Joanna-Grace Jackson (born 1994), known professionally as Sloan Peterson is an American-Australian singer/songwriter from Sydney, New South Wales. She initially grew up in Los Angeles, however she moved to Sydney as a teenager. Sloan signed a record deal with Warner Music Australia in 2020.

== Career ==
Joannah released her debut EP Midnight Love in 2017 and her album Midnight Love, Vol 2 in 2019.

== Discography ==
=== Albums ===
Title	Details
Midnight Love, Vol 2	Released: 19 April 2019; Label: Mirror Records; Format: digital download, streaming

=== EP's ===
Title	Details
Midnight Love	Released: 22 September 2017; Label: Mirror Records; Format: digital download, streaming

=== Singles ===
List of singles, with year released and album name shown
Title	Year	Album
"105"	2017	Midnight Love EP
"Rats"	2017	Midnight Love EP
"I Want You"	2017	Midnight Love EP
"Our Love"	2018	Midnight Love, Vol. 2
"New Direction"	2018	Midnight Love, Vol. 2
"Here"	2019	Midnight Love, Vol. 2
"Golden Remedy" with Feki and Lanks	2020	TBA
"Nightmare"	2020	TBA
"Moon & Back"	2021	TBA
"Parasite"	2021	TBA
"Wear Out My Heart" (featuring Pearl)	2022	
