= Broken Brights =

Studio album by Angus Stone
- Released: 13 July 2012
- Studio: Desert Harvest Studios, Byron Bay, Sing sing Studios, Melbourne, Australia; Plug & Play Studios, Nyon, Switzerland
- Length: 61:18
- Label: Desert Harvest Records

Angus Stone chronology
| Smoking Gun (2009) | Broken Brights (2012) | Honey Bones (2016) |

Professional ratings
Review scores
| Source | Rating |
|---|---|
| AllMusic | 4/5 stars |
| Consequence of Sound | C− |
| The Line of Best Fit | 7/10 |
| MusicOMH | 2/5 stars |
| The Sydney Morning Herald | 2/5 stars |

Broken Brights is the second studio album by Australian musician Angus Stone, released in July 2012. It peaked at number 2 in Australia and was certified gold. At the ARIA Music Awards of 2012, the album was nominated for Best Male Artist and Best Blues and Roots Album.

== Track listing ==
All tracks are written by Angus Stone

| No. | Title | Length |
|---|---|---|
| 1. | "River Love" | 4:55 |
| 2. | "Broken Brights" | 4:12 |
| 3. | "Bird On the Buffalo" | 5:50 |
| 4. | "Wooden Chair" | 3:25 |
| 5. | "The Blue Door" | 3:31 |
| 6. | "Apprentice of the Rocket Man" | 5:24 |
| 7. | "Only a Woman" | 6:25 |
| 8. | "The Wolf and the Butler" | 4:10 |
| 9. | "Monsters" | 5:20 |
| 10. | "It Was Blue" | 5:12 |
| 11. | "Be What You Be" | 4:52 |
| 12. | "Clouds Above" | 2:51 |
| 13. | "End of the World" | 5:14 |
| 14. | "Happy Together" (bonus track) | 2:25 |
| Total length: | | 61:18 |

== Charts ==
=== Weekly charts ===
| Chart (2012) | Peak position |
|---|---|
| Australian Albums (ARIA) | 2 |
| Belgian Albums (Ultratop Flanders) | 23 |
| Belgian Albums (Ultratop Wallonia) | 26 |
| French Albums (SNEP) | 67 |
| German Albums (Offizielle Top 100) | 67 |
| Dutch Albums (Album Top 100) | 42 |
| New Zealand Albums (RMNZ) | 32 |
| Swiss Albums (Schweizer Hitparade) | 27 |

=== Year-end charts ===
| Chart (2012) | Rank |
|---|---|
| Australian Albums Chart | 67 |
| Australian Artist Albums Chart | 20 |

== Certifications ==
| Region | Certification | Certified units/sales |
|---|---|---|
| Australia (ARIA) | Gold | 35,000^{^} |
^{^} Shipments figures based on certification alone.
