= Brad Heald =

Australian bassist and guitarist

- Heald onstage with The Vines in 2011

Background information
- Born: 3 March 1983 (age 43); Sydney, Australia
- Genres: Alternative rock, garage rock revival, post-grunge, indie rock, neo-psychedelia
- Occupation: Musician
- Instruments: Bass guitar, guitar
- Years active: 2004–present

Brad Heald (born 3 March 1983) is an Australian musician who is the bass guitarist of Angus Stone's project Dope Lemon. He was previously the bassist of the garage rock band The Vines and lead guitarist of Sydney band Red Riders. He also has played with the indie punk bands Dune Rats and Skegss.

== Biography ==
Originally from Cronulla in the Sutherland Shire of Sydney, Brad grew up playing piano. His mother was a classical piano player. After learning guitar and bass, he began playing in Sydney band D'Arcy. After meeting Vines guitarist Ryan Griffiths at a house party that D'Arcy played, Heald was invited to try out for The Vines. He officially replaced Patrick Matthews, the previous bass guitarist of The Vines, in 2006. He joined the band in July, making his first appearance with the band at Splendour in the Grass, followed by an appearance at Reading and Leads festival. His debut album with the group was Melodia, released in 2008. By November 2008, The Vines' vocalist and lead guitarist, Craig Nicholls, was debilitated by his Asperger's syndrome and the band's tour was cancelled.

In December 2008, Heald joined Red Riders as their new lead guitarist, and in February 2009 started recording their next album. The album, Drown in Colour, was released in 2009. After Red Riders disbanded in 2011, Heald returned to playing with The Vines; releasing the album Future Primitive later that year. Heald quietly departed from the band in 2012, having stayed on as a member for a remainder of festival commitments following the departure of Griffith and drummer Hamish Rosser. He then went on to play on tour with indie punk band Dune Rats in 2012; whom he had originally met on tour with The Vines. Brad also made an appearance on bass with the surf-punk band Skegss in 2016 at Wonderland Festival in Perth, Western Australia.

After relocating to Byron Bay in 2015, Brad joined friend Angus Stone on his project Dope Lemon. Heald continues to record and tour with Dope Lemon, performing at festivals such as Womadelaide, Falls Festival and Splendour in the Grass in 2017. More recently, Heald has also worked with Australian singer-songwriter Ruby Fields and Wollongong psych-rock collective The Walking Who. In 2017, Heald reunited for a series of shows with Red Riders; performing as a guest guitarist for songs on the Drown in Colour album.

In 2018, Heald joined Wolfmother as their new bassist, replacing long-serving member Ian Peres.

== Discography ==
The Vines

- Melodia (2008)
- Future Primitive (2011)

Red Riders

- Drown in Colour (2009)

Dope Lemon

- Honey Bones (2016)
