= Pound System =

Australian musical group

- Origin: Melbourne, Victoria, Australia
- Genres: electronica
- Members: Woody; The Reverend

Pound System is a Melbourne-based electronica outfit. Both members also work as producers, working with Rocket Science, Screamfeeder and Sarah McLeod and have remixed song by many artists such as 28 Days, Spiderbait, Regurgitator, Kylie Minogue and Josh Abrahams. Their 2001 album You Know It Makes Sense features appearances by Katie Noonan and Spiderbait's Whit.

== Discography ==
- The Counterfeit Bootleg
- Get Amongst It
- You Know It Makes Sense (2001)
