= Bang the Drum (band) =

Australian pop rock band

- Origin: Sydney, Australia
- Years active: 1989-1991
- Members: Steve Driver; Jim Reece; Geoff Robson; Jeremy Cole; J. J. Harris

Bang the Drum was an Australian pop rock band formed in Sydney. Two of their singles reached the top 50 on the Australian Singles chart.

== Background ==
Formed in 1980 Tasmanian rock band Shifters consisted of Steve Driver (vocals), Jim Reece (guitar, vocals), Geoff Robson (bass, vocals) and Freddy Spiteri (drummer). The band split their time between touring heavily in Tasmania and playing in Sydney before breaking up in 1985. The band put out two singles, "Holdin' Out"/"Public Man" and "Sunday Night Blues"/"Desperate Life", in the early 80s.

== Bang the Drum ==
Driver, Reece and Robson stayed in Sydney and formed Bang the Drum. Completing the band was J. J. Harris (ex Divinyls) and Jeremy Cole. The band released one selftitled album in 1990 and toured nationally in support of Fleetwood Mac.

== Members ==
- Steve Driver (vocals)
- Jim Reece (guitar, vocals)
- Geoff Robson (bass, vocals)
- Jeremy Cole (keyboards)
- J. J. Harris (drums)

== Discography ==
=== Albums ===
Title	Details	Peak chart positions
Title	Details	AUS
Bang the Drum	Released: May 1990; Label: WEA (256872-1); Format: LP, Cassette, CD	51

=== Singles ===
Year	Single	Peak chart positions	Album
Year	Single	AUS	Album
1990	"Only You"	31	Bang the Drum
1990	"Passion"	43	Bang the Drum
1990	"Stay Forever"	114	Bang the Drum
