= Whipped Cream (band) =

Swedish rock band

- Origin: Gothenburg, Sweden
- Genres: Alternative rock Psychedelic rock
- Years active: 1989–mid-1990s
- Labels: Snap
- Past members: Elisabeth Punzi; Jörgen Cremonese; Jonas Sonesson; Lars Erik Grimelund; Fredrik Sandsten

Whipped Cream was a rock band from Gothenburg, Sweden, formed in 1989.

== History ==
Whipped Cream formed in 1989 with an initial line-up of Elisabeth Punzi (vocals), Jörgen Cremonese (vocals, guitars), Jonas Sonesson (bass), and Lars Erik Grimelund (drums). With a sound heavily influenced by late 1960s/early 1970s psychedelic rock, and gaining comparisons to My Bloody Valentine, they released their debut album, ...and Other Delights, in 1990. The album was well received, and the band was invited to record a session for John Peel's BBC Radio 1 show in 1991. The 1992 follow-up, Tune In the Century, received widespread critical acclaim, with one Swedish reviewer calling it "a milestone in Swedish recording history", and featured a cover version of Captain Beefheart's "Observatory Crest", which was issued as a single the same year. The band's third album, the much more heavy-rock sounding Horse Mountain (1994), by now with Fredrik Sandsten (later of The Soundtrack of Our Lives) on drums, was followed by a split in the band, with Sandsten and Sonesson leaving.

Cremonese and Punzi worked on a proposed 1996 album Possessed, with musicians including King Diamond drummer Snowy Shaw, Mercyful Fate bassist Sharlee D'Angelo and keyboard player Charlie Storm, although the album was never recorded Cremonese went on working as a producer and in several projects with musicians such as Michael Lohse of Atomic Swing. As the music business declined Cremoneses music he turned to do art and noise music without releasing anything of his own for a long time. The number of albums released with Cremonese on both electric and acoustic guitars and backing vocals is vast, and in all genres. Hugely acclaimed Swedish acts as alternative Silverbullit and melodic metal act Beesech has Cremonese as guest guitarist on their albums and live. Cremonese refused to return to the music industry but rumour says that he has worked for a few years in a solo project - Farmer In The City with influences from psychedelia, shoegaze and folk. In 2016 Cremonese engineered and co-produced the comeback album of Kai Martin & Stick! [UTAN TITEL], the first professional band he joined at 19. The music is post-punk inspired and shows another side of Cremonese and his songwriting. Also in 2016 Cremonese participated with mega-noise guitars on The Leather Nun live album. Punzi later worked with The Mole Session.

== Discography ==
=== Albums ===
- ...and Other Delights (1990) Snap/Chameleon
- Tune in the Century (1992) Snap
- Horse Mountain (1994) Snap

=== Singles, EPs ===
- "Come Together" (1991) Snap
- "Observatory Crest" (1992) Snap
- "Wait For a Minute" (1992) Snap
- "You and I" (1994) Snap
